= Sikh Regiment =

Infantry regiment of the Indian Army

- Badge of the Sikh Regiment
- Active: 1 August 1846 – present
- Country: India
- Branch: Indian Army
- Type: Line Infantry
- Role: Infantry
- Size: 20 battalions
- Garrison/HQ: Ramgarh Cantonment, Jharkhand
- Mottos: Nische Kar Apni Jeet Karon (With determination, I will be triumphant).
- War Cry: Bole So Nihal Sat Sri Akaal (Shout Aloud in Ecstasy, True is the Great Eternal God!)
- Anniversaries: 12 September Battle of Saragarhi
- Decorations: 1 Padma Vibhushan; 1 Padma Bhushan; 21 Indian Order of Merits; 14 Victoria Crosses; 2 Param Vir Chakras; 4 Ashoka Chakras; 8 Maha Vir Chakras; 24 Kirti Chakras; 64 Vir Chakras; 55 Shaurya Chakras; 375 Sena Medals; 22 Param Vishisht Seva Medals; 40 Ati Vishisht Seva Medals; 45 Vishisht Seva Medals; 13 Uttam Yudh Seva Medals; 21 Yudh Seva Medals; Unit Citation to 8 Sikh

Commanders
- Colonel of the Regiment: Maj Gen K. S. Dhadwal

Insignia
- Regimental Insignia: Lion, symbolic of the name (Singh) every Sikh carries, ringed by a chakra

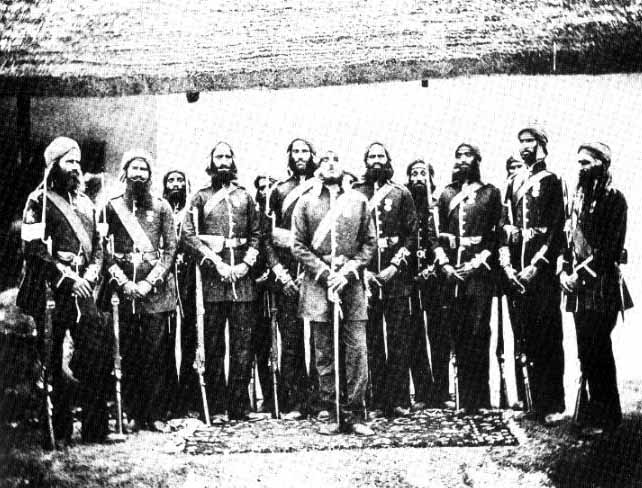
Men of the Regiment of Ludhiana (later the 15th Ludhiana Sikhs) during the Second Opium War in China, c. 1860.

The Sikh Regiment is an infantry regiment of the Indian Army. It is the most highly decorated regiment of the Indian Army and in 1979, the 1st battalion was the Commonwealth's most decorated battalion, with 245 pre-independence and 82 post-independence gallantry awards, when it was transformed into the 4th battalion, Mechanised Infantry Regiment. The first battalion of the regiment was officially raised just before the partial annexation of the Sikh Empire on 1 August 1846, by the British East India Company. Currently, the Sikh Regimental Centre is located in Ramgarh Cantonment, Jharkhand. The Centre was earlier located in Meerut, Uttar Pradesh.

The modern Sikh Regiment traces its roots directly from the 11th Sikh Regiment of the British Indian Army. When transferred to the Indian Army like its sister regiments, the numeral prefix (in the case of the Sikh Regiment, 11) was removed and extra battalions were raised, transferred or disbanded to meet army needs. With a humble beginning of two battalions, today the fraternity has grown to a regiment of 19 regular infantry and two reserve battalions strong. The 6th battalion takes over as ceremonial battalion of President's palace of India.

== History ==
After the First Anglo-Sikh War (1845-1846), Sikhs who lived in the territory ruled by the Sikh Empire (the Punjab region) began to be recruited into the Bengal Army of the British East India Company. Among the earliest entirely Sikh units of the Bengal Army were the Regiment of Ferozepore (raised in 1846) which later became the 14th King George's Own Ferozepore Sikhs, and the Regiment of Ludhiana (also raised in 1846) which later became the 15th Ludhiana Sikhs. After the Second Anglo-Sikh War (1848-1849) more Punjabis began to be recruited into the Bengal Army, forming regiments such as the 1st Bengal Military Police Battalion, which later became the 45th Rattray's Sikhs. Sikh units generally remained loyal to the British during the Indian Rebellion of 1857, in which many regiments of the Bengal Army (which mainly recruited from Bengal, Bihar and Awadh) mutinied against their British officers. After the rebellion, troops from Bihar and Awadh were recruited less as they had led the mutiny; the centre of recruitment then shifted to the Punjab and the North-West Frontier, resulting in more Sikhs being recruited into the Bengal Army. A number of new Sikh regiments were raised, such as the 36th Sikhs and 35th Sikhs, both raised in 1887. 21 soldiers of the 36th Sikhs fought in the Battle of Saragarhi against 6,000-10,000 Pashtun tribesmen in 1897 during campaigns in the North-West Frontier, in what is considered by some military historians as one of history's greatest last stands. In 1922 the Indian government reformed the British Indian Army by amalgamating single battalion regiments into multi-battalion regiments; this led to the formation of the 11th Sikh Regiment from the 14th King George's Own Ferozepore Sikhs, the 15th Ludhiana Sikhs, the 45th Rattray's Sikhs, the 36th Sikhs, the 47th Sikhs, and the 35th Sikhs. The 11th Sikh Regiment served during World War II and on the partition of India, the regiment was allotted to the newly formed Indian Army, becoming the Sikh Regiment.

As part of the British Indian Army, Sikh regiments fought in numerous wars all over the world, such as the Second Opium War in China, the Second Anglo-Afghan War, many campaigns on the North-West Frontier, the Western Front, Gallipoli and Mesopotamia campaigns of the First World War, the Third Anglo-Afghan War, and the North African, Italian and Burma campaigns of the Second World War, earning many gallantry awards and battle honours in the process.

During the Indo-Pakistani War of 1947-1948, the 1st battalion of the Sikh Regiment was the first unit to be airlifted to Srinagar to aid in the defence of the Kashmir Valley against Pakistani irregular forces. Battalions of the Sikh Regiment also fought in the Sino-Indian War in 1962, the Indo-Pakistani wars of 1965 and 1971, and the Kargil War in 1999.

== Recruitment ==
Sikh regiment is a "single class" regiment. Its soldiers are solely recruited from Jat Sikhs and its officers are non-Jat Sikhs. They are trained at the Sikh Regimental Centre, currently located in Ramgarh Cantonment, Jharkhand. The war cry of the regiment, taken from Sikh scriptures, is Jo Bole So Nihal, Sat Sri Akal. (Note: English: One will be blessed eternally who says that God is the ultimate truth)

== Units ==
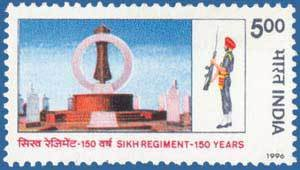
1996 postal stamp on 150 years of The Sikh Regiment

- 2nd Battalion
- 3rd Battalion
- 4th Battalion
- 5th Battalion
- 6th Battalion
- 7th Battalion
- 8th Battalion
- 10th Battalion
- 11th Battalion
- 13th Battalion
- 14th Battalion
- 16th Battalion
- 17th Battalion
- 18th Battalion
- 19th Battalion
- 20th Battalion
- 21st Battalion
- 22nd Battalion
- 23rd Battalion
- 24th Battalion

Territorial Army (TA) Units-

- 124 Infantry Battalion (TA) (Sikh) located at New Delhi
- 152 Infantry Battalion (TA) (Sikh) located at Ludhiana, Punjab
- 157 Infantry Battalion (TA) (Sikh) (Home and Hearth) BD Bari, Jammu and Kashmir

Others:

- 1st Battalion is now 4th Battalion, Mechanised Infantry Regiment
- 9th Battalion was disbanded in 1984

== Battle honours and theatre honours ==
=== Battle honours ===
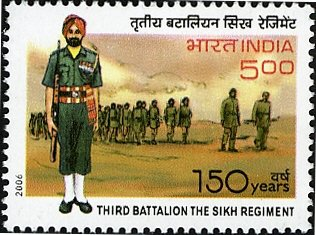
2006 postal stamp on 150 years of Third Battalion, The Sikh Regiment

Pre-Independence

- Lucknow 1857-58, 1 Sikh
- Arrah 1857, 3 Sikh
- Bihar 1857, 3 Sikh
- China 1860-62, 2 Sikh
- Ali Masjid 1878, 1 & 3 Sikh
- Ahmed Khel 1880, 2 Sikh
- Afghanistan 1878-79, 1 Sikh
- Afghanistan 1878-80, 2 & 3 Sikh
- Kandahar 1880, 2 Sikh
- Suakin 1885, 2 Sikh
- Tofrek 1885, 2 Sikh
- Manipur 1891, 4 Sikh
- Chitral 1895, 1 & 2 Sikh
- Samana 1897, 4 Sikh
- Saragarhi/Gulistan 1897, 36 Sikh
- Punjab Frontier 1897, 2, 3, 4 & 35 Sikh (SRC)
- Malakand 1897, 3 & 35 Sikh (SRC)
- Tirah 1897-98, 2 & 4 Sikh
- China 1900, 1 Sikh
- North-West Frontier 1908, 3 Sikh

World War I

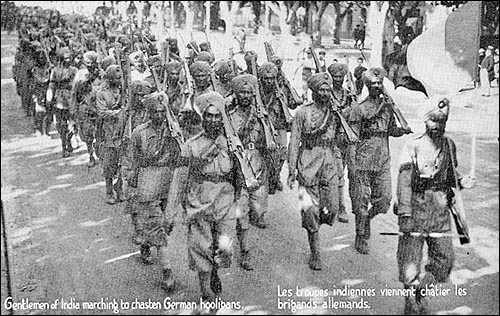
French postcard depicting the arrival of 15th Ludhiana Sikhs in France during World War I. The postcard reads, "Gentlemen of India marching to chasten the German hooligans".

- La Bassée 1914, 2 & 5 Sikh
- St-Julien 1914, 2 & 5 Sikh
- Armentières 1914-15, 5 Sikh
- Auber 1914, 2 & 5 Sikh
- Givens 1914, 4 Sikh
- Tsingtao 1914, 4 & 5 Sikh
- Neuve Chapelle 1914-15, 2, 3 & 5 Sikh
- France and Flanders 1914-15, 2 & 5 Sikh
- Suez Canal 1914-15, 1 Sikh
- Festubert 1915, 2 Sikh
- Tigris 1916, 3 & 5 Sikh
- Pyres 1915, 2 & 4 Sikh
- Sari Bair 1915, 1 Sikh
- Helles 1915, 1 Sikh
- Krishna 1915, 1 Sikh
- Suva 1915, 1 Sikh
- Gallipoli 1915, 1 Sikh
- Egypt 1915, 1 Sikh
- Mesopotamia 1916-18, 1, 3 & 4 Sikh
- Sharon 1918, 2 & 5 Sikh
- Palestine 1918, 5 Sikh
- Baghdad 1916-18, 5 Sikh
- Kut 1917, 1, 3 & 5 Sikh
- Hai 1917, 3 & 4 Sikh
- Megiddo 1918, 5 Sikh
- Persia 1918, 4 Sikh
- Egypt 1918, 2 & 3 Sikh

Inter-War years

- North-West Frontier 1918-19, 5 Sikh
- Afghanistan 1919, 2 Sikh
- Palestine 1921, 5 Sikh

Second World War

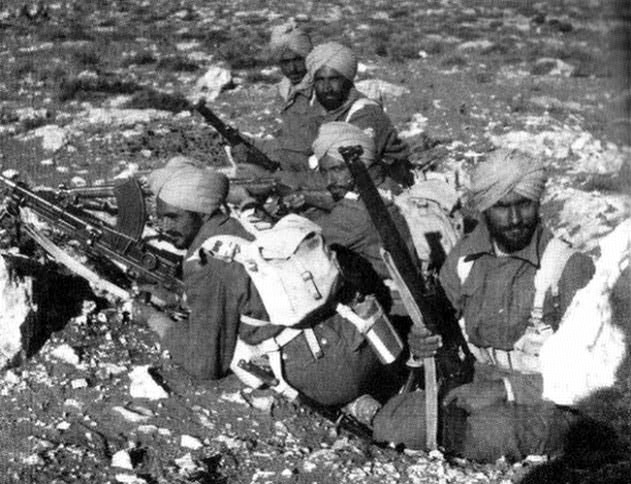
Sikh troops engaged in Operation Crusader.

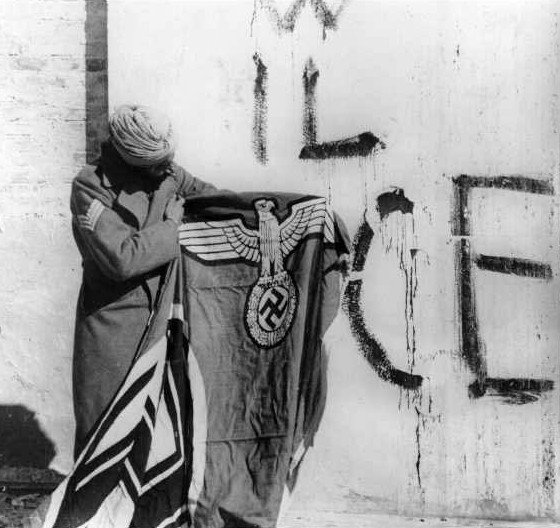
A Sikh soldier with the flag of Nazi Germany after German surrender during World War II.

- Agordat 1940-41, 4 Sikh
- Keren 1941, 4 Sikh
- El Alamein 1940-43, 4 Sikh
- Omars 1941, 4 Sikh
- Kuantan 1941-42, 5 Sikh
- Niyor Kluang 1941-42, 5 Sikh
- Mersa Matruh 1941-42, 2 Sikh
- Kota Bharu 1942, 5 Sikh
- North Arakan 1942-45, 1 Sikh
- Buthidaung 1942-45, 1 Sikh
- Coriano 1943-45, 2 Sikh
- San Marino 1943-45, 2 Sikh
- Poggio San Giovanni 1943-45, 2 Sikh
- Monte Calvo 1943-45, 4 Sikh
- Kangla Tongbi 1944, 1 Sikh
- Gothic Line 1943-45, 4 Sikh
- Nyaung U Bridgehead 1945, 1 Sikh
- Irrawaddy River 1945, 1 Sikh
- Shandatgyi 1945, 1 Sikh
- Kama 1945, 1 Sikh
- Sittang 1945, 1 Sikh

Post-Independence

- Srinagar 1947, 1 Sikh
- Tithwal 1948, 1 Sikh
- Raja Picquet 1965, 2 Sikh
- Burki 1965, 4 Sikh
- Op Hill 1965, 7 Sikh
- Siramani 1971, 4 Sikh
- Poonch 1971, 6 Sikh
- Purbat Ali 1971, 10 Sikh
- Tiger Hill 1999, 8 Sikh

=== Theatre honours ===
Pre-Independence

- North Africa 1940-43, 2 & 4 Sikh
- Abyssinia 1940-41, 4 Sikh
- Iraq 1941, 3 Sikh
- North Africa 1941-42, 3 Sikh
- Malaya 1941-42, 5 Sikh
- Burma 1942-45, 1 Sikh
- Italy 1943-45, 2 & 4 Sikh
- Greece 1944-45, 2 Sikh

Post-Independence

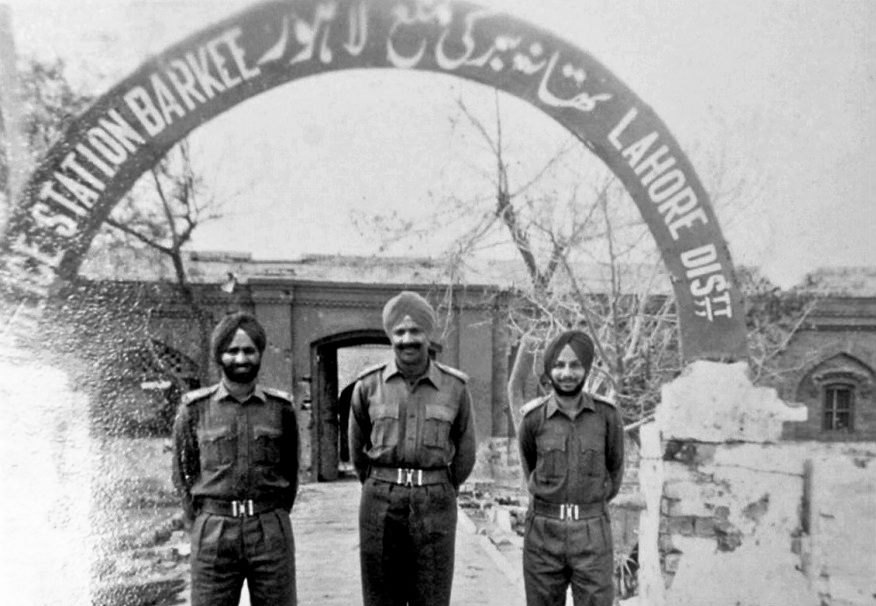
Officers of 4th Sikh Regiment in front of captured police station in Lahore, Pakistan, September 1965.

- Jammu & Kashmir 1947-48, 1, 5, 7 & 16 Sikh
- Jammu & Kashmir 1965, 2, 3 & 7 Sikh
- Punjab 1965, 4 Sikh
- Sindh 1971, 10 Sikh
- Punjab 1971, 2 Sikh
- East Pakistan 1971, 4 Sikh
- Jammu & Kashmir 1971, 5 & 6 Sikh
- Kargil 1999, 8 Sikh

== Operation Blue Star ==
About 5,000 Sikh soldiers, some belonging to the regiment, mutinied after the storming of the Golden Temple by the Indian Army as part of Operation Blue Star in 1984. The Sikh Regiment's 9th battalion was disbanded after a large number of its troops mutinied.

== Gallantry awards ==
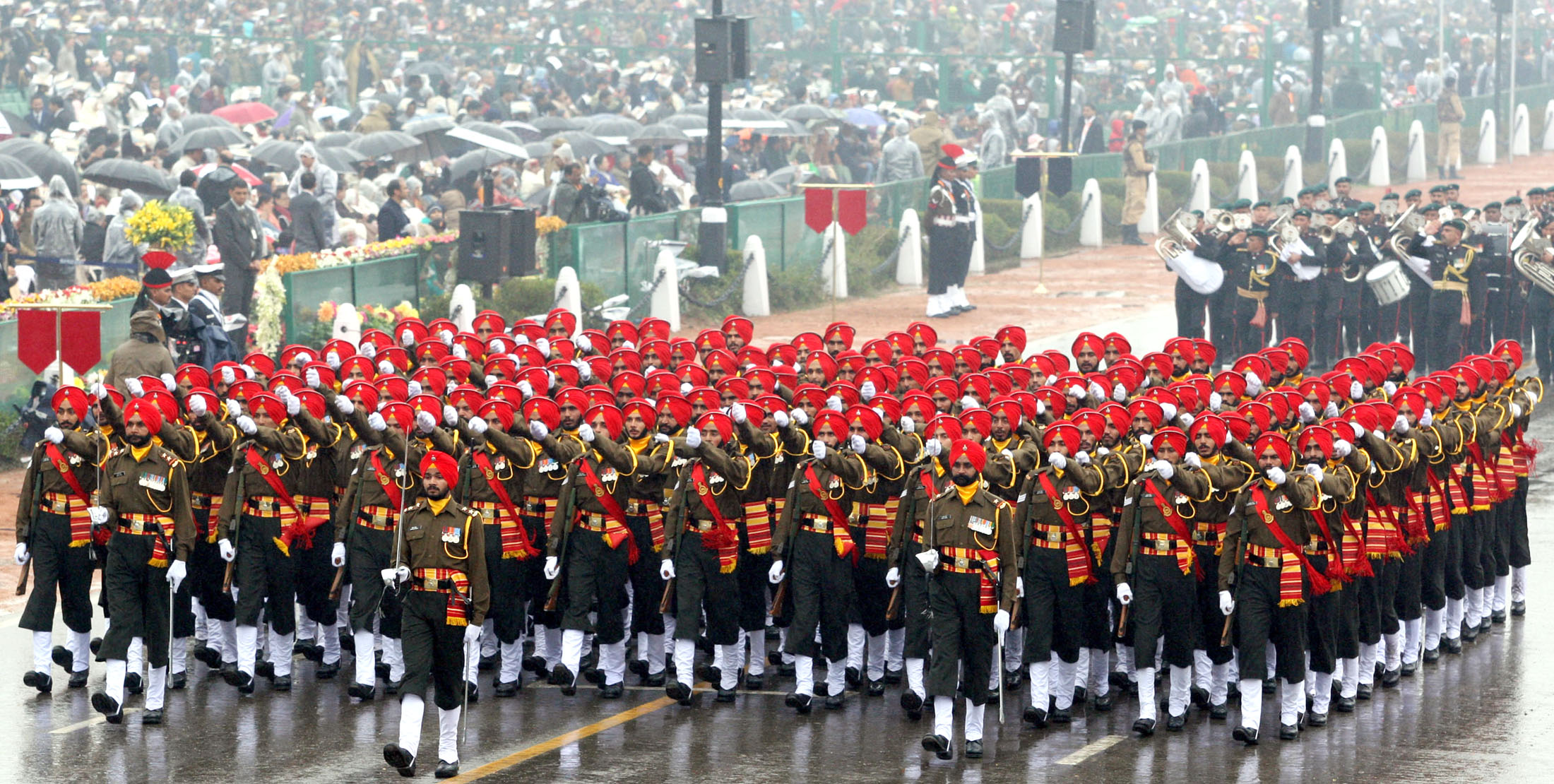
The Sikh Regiment marching contingent passes through the Rajpath during the 66th Republic Day Parade, 2015

The museum of the Sikh Regimental Centre displays a record of the Sikh Regiment in four halls viz.,

- The Religious/Motivational Hall
- The Hall of Heritage
- The Regimental Glory Hall
- The Peripheral Gallery

In all, the regiment has to its credit 1652 gallantry awards and honours including:

- 2 Param Vir Chakras
- 8 Maha Vir Chakras
- 64 Vir Chakras
- 4 Ashoka Chakras
- 14 Victoria Crosses
- 21 Indian Order of Merits

In addition it has also earned:

- 75 battle honours
- 38 theatre honours besides five COAS Unit Citations

=== Indian Order of Merit ===
21 soldiers of the 36th Sikhs were posthumously awarded the Indian Order of Merit for their actions in the Battle of Saragarhi in 1897:

- Hav. Ishar Singh
- Nk. Lal Singh
- L/Nk. Chanda Singh
- Sep. Sundar Singh
- Sep. Ram Singh
- Sep. Uttar Singh
- Sep. Sahib Singh
- Sep. Hira Singh
- Sep. Daya Singh
- Sep. Jivan Singh
- Sep. Bhola Singh
- Sep. Narayan Singh
- Sep. Gurmukh Singh
- Sep. Jivan Singh
- Sep. Gurmukh Singh
- Sep. Ram Singh
- Sep. Bhagwan Singh
- Sep. Bhagwan Singh
- Sep. Buta Singh
- Sep. Jivan Singh
- Sep. Nand Singh

=== Victoria Cross ===
- Nk. Gian Singh, 11th Sikh Regiment (while serving in 15th Punjab Regiment)
- Nk. Nand Singh, 11th Sikh Regiment

=== Param Vir Chakra ===
- Lance Naik Karam Singh, 1 Sikh Regiment
- Subedar Joginder Singh, 1 Sikh Regiment

=== Ashok Chakra ===
- Subedar Surinder Singh
- Havildar Bachittar Singh
- Havildar Joginder Singh

=== Maha Vir Chakra ===
- Major Ajit Singh
- Sub. Ajit Singh
- Sep. Amar Singh
- Brigadier Joginder Singh Bakshi
- Major Amarjit Singh Bal
- Lieutenant Colonel Inderbal Singh Bawa
- Sub. Nand Singh
- Lieutenant Colonel Dewan Ranjit Rai
- Shanghara Singh

=== Vir Chakra ===
- Lieutenant General Harbaksh Singh
- Subedar Nirmal Singh (Posthumously)
- Subedar Karnail Singh (Posthumously)
- Sepoy Satpal Singh
- 2nd Lieutenant R S Nagar (16 Sikh Regiment)
- L/Nk Mohinder Singh (16 Sikh Regt)

=== Padma Vibhushan ===
- Lieutenant General Harbaksh Singh

=== Padma Bhushan ===
- Lieutenant General Harbaksh Singh

=== Padma Shri ===
- Subedar Kaur Singh (10 Sikh) Boxing

== See also ==
- Baba Harbhajan Singh

== Alliances ==
- United Kingdom - Duke of Lancaster's Regiment
