= Bhawani Datt Joshi =

Ashoka Chakra recipient

Naik Bhawani Datt Joshi AC
- Born: July 15, 1952; Garhwal, Uttarkhand
- Died: July 6, 1984 (aged 31); Amritsar, Punjab
- Military career
- Allegiance: India
- Branch: Indian Army
- Service years: 1970 — 1984
- Rank: Naik
- Service number: 4050561
- Unit: 9 Garhwal Rifles
- Conflicts: Operation Blue Star
- Awards: Ashoka Chakra

Bhawani Datt Joshi,AC was a soldier of the Indian Army, who was killed in action during Operation Blue Star. He was posthumously awarded the Ashoka Chakra, India's highest peacetime gallantry award. He is the only person of his regiment to win the award.
