= Rambeer Singh Tomar =

Indian Army officer (1970–2001)

Naik Rambeer Singh Tomar AC
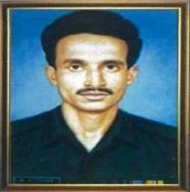
- Portrait of Naik Rambeer Singh Tomar
- Born: 15 August 1970; Madhya Pradesh, India
- Died: 18 October 2001 (aged 31); Doda district, Jammu and Kashmir, India
- Military career
- Allegiance: India
- Branch: Indian Army
- Service years: 1989-2001
- Rank: Naik
- Service number: 4183850
- Unit: 26 RR/15 Kumaon
- Awards: Ashok Chakra

Naik Rambeer Singh Tomar, AC (15 August 1970 – 18 October 2001) was an Indian Army Non Commissioned Officer (NCO) with the 15th Battalion of the Kumaon Regiment. For his bravery, he was posthumously awarded the Ashoka Chakra, the highest peace time military decoration in India.

While being sent on deputation to 26 Rashtriya Rifles in Jammu and Kashmir, Tomar single-handedly searched a house for terrorists. In the process, he killed four of them but sustained severe gunshot wounds and succumbed to his injuries.

== Early life ==
Naik Rambeer Singh Tomar was born on 15 August 1970, in the family of Hon. Captain Rajendra Singh Tomar (15 kumaon) and Urmila Devi in village Prempura, Morena district in Madhya Pradesh. He had one younger sister and two brothers, both of them are serving in Madhya Pradesh Police. From very young age he excelled both in his studies and other skilled work.

== Military career ==
On 28 July 1989, Naik Rambeer was recruited into the 15th Battalion of the Kumaon Regiment, a regiment known for its gallant soldiers and numerous battle honours. Due to his dedication to his motherland, Naik Rambeer volunteered twice to 26 Rashtriya Rifles, deployed in Jammu and Kashmir for counterinsurgency operations.

== Doda Operation ==
On 17 October 2001, Naik Rambeer Singh's unit received information about the presence of terrorists in a house in a village in Doda district which was located in its area of responsibility. A decision was taken by the security forces to launch a quick and well-coordinated operation to flush out the terrorists. The Ghatak Team (assault team) which Naik Rambeer Singh was part of, swung into action and set out to cordon off the suspected area. The terrorists on being surrounded and challenged opened fire at the troops. This resulted in a gun battle where the terrorists were firing from the safe locations inside the building.

It was then decided to storm the building in a search and destroy operation to neutralize the hiding terrorists. Naik Rambeer volunteered to lead the team to storm the house. He displayed agility and unparalleled courage while entering the house and lobbed a grenade killing two terrorists on the spot. The third terrorist charged at Naik Rambeer and in a fierce hand-to-hand combat, he overpowered the terrorist and shot him dead. Sensing presence of more terrorists in the adjacent room and danger to his buddy, Naik Rambeer stormed the room in a daredevil action.

However, during the exchange of fire, Naik Rambeer was shot in his eye by the terrorist hiding in the room. Despite bleeding profusely Naik Rambeer displaying outstanding bravery threw a grenade and killed the fourth terrorist too. Naik Rambeer got severely injured during the operation and later succumbed to his injuries. Naik Rambeer single-handedly killed four terrorists and played a key role in successful completion of the operation wherein all the terrorists were neutralized.

== Ashoka Chakra awardee ==
Naik Rambeer Singh was given the nation's highest peacetime gallantry award, "Ashok Chakra" for displaying most conspicuous bravery, inspiring leadership, and unyielding fighting spirit in the face of the enemy.
