= Sundar Singh (soldier) =

Indian army officer (1929–2017)

Subedar Major and Honorary Captain Sundar Singh AC
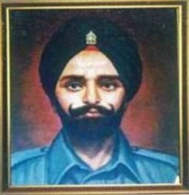
- Portrait of Subedar Major and Honorary Captain Sundar Singh
- Born: 14 February 1929; Chowki Handan Village, Poonch District, Jammu & Kashmir
- Died: 23 January 2017 (aged 87); Chauk Hadan, Nowshera, Jammu and Kashmir
- Military career
- Allegiance: British India; India
- Branch: British Indian Army; Indian Army
- Service years: 1947–?
- Rank: Subedar Major Honorary Captain
- Service number: 15103
- Unit: 4 JAK RIF
- Awards: Ashoka Chakra

Subedar Major and Honorary Captain Sundar Singh, AC (14 February 1929 – 23 January 2017) was an Indian Army officer of 4 Jammu & Kashmir Rifles who was awarded India's highest peace time military decoration Ashoka Chakra. He became the first recipient of the award from Jammu & Kashmir.

== Early life ==
Sunder Singh was born on 14 February 1929 in Chauk Hadan Village of Poonch District, Jammu & Kashmir. His father was Kalyan Singh.

== Military career ==
He was enrolled in the Jammu & Kashmir Infantry in February 1947. He was posted to 4 JAK RIF and retired from his duties as Subedar Major and Honorary Captain. Singh after completion of his training, was posted as a soldier in Jammu & Kashmir State Force (after 1957 it became J&K Rifles). In 1952, he was made Acting Lance Naik by his Commanding Officer for his actions in rescuing his family members from Pakistan.

== Operation ==
On 18 March 1956 he was posted with Jammu & Kashmir Rifles at Hussainiwala near Ferozepore. On the night of 18/19 March J&K RIF's unit was attacked by elements of the Pakistani Army. His unit responded with a counterattack and chased them away from the right side of the dam. Other hostile elements then moved into positions at Bela, starting to fire towards the left side of the dam with light machine guns. This made it difficult for India to retain the dam and safeguard the troops there.

Sunder Singh's name was suggested to destroy the position, and on being ordered Sunder agreed immediately. Armed with six hand grenades and amidst hostile fire, he crawled one hundred and fifty meters to a rocky area. When he was near to the enemy position, he threw his first grenade which killed three enemies and silenced their guns. He did this three times which allowed Jammu & Kashmir Rifles to possess the right end of dam.

== Death ==
Singh died on 23 January 2017 in his home village of Chauk Hadan. His death received no official acknowledgement.
