= R. P. Diengdoh =

Shri R. P. Diengdoh AC
- Born: 10 October 1975; Lum-Batgen, East Khasi Hills, Shillong, Meghalaya, India, Meghalaya, India
- Died: 7 November 2007 (aged 32); Meghalaya, India
- Spouse: Sati Mosha Blah
- Police career
- Allegiance: India
- Branch: Meghalaya Police
- Service years: 2004-2007
- Rank: Deputy Superintendent of Police
- Awards: Ashoka Chakra

R. P. Diengdoh, AC was an Indian police officer with the Meghalaya Police who was posthumously awarded India's highest peace time gallantry award Ashoka Chakra.

== Early life ==
Raymond P. Diengdoh was born in Lum-Batgen, East Khasi Hills, Shillong on 10 October 1975. His father's name was Philip Basaiwmoit. He was selected as a Deputy Superintendent in Meghalaya Police in 2004 batch.

== Gallant act ==
On 7 November 2007, he led an operation to eliminate militants from the Meghalayan jungles. In the process, he killed one militant and helped capture two, but sustained gunshot wounds and later succumbed to his injuries. For his bravery, he was posthumously awarded the Ashoka Chakra, the highest peace time military decoration in India.

== Ashoka Chakra awardee ==
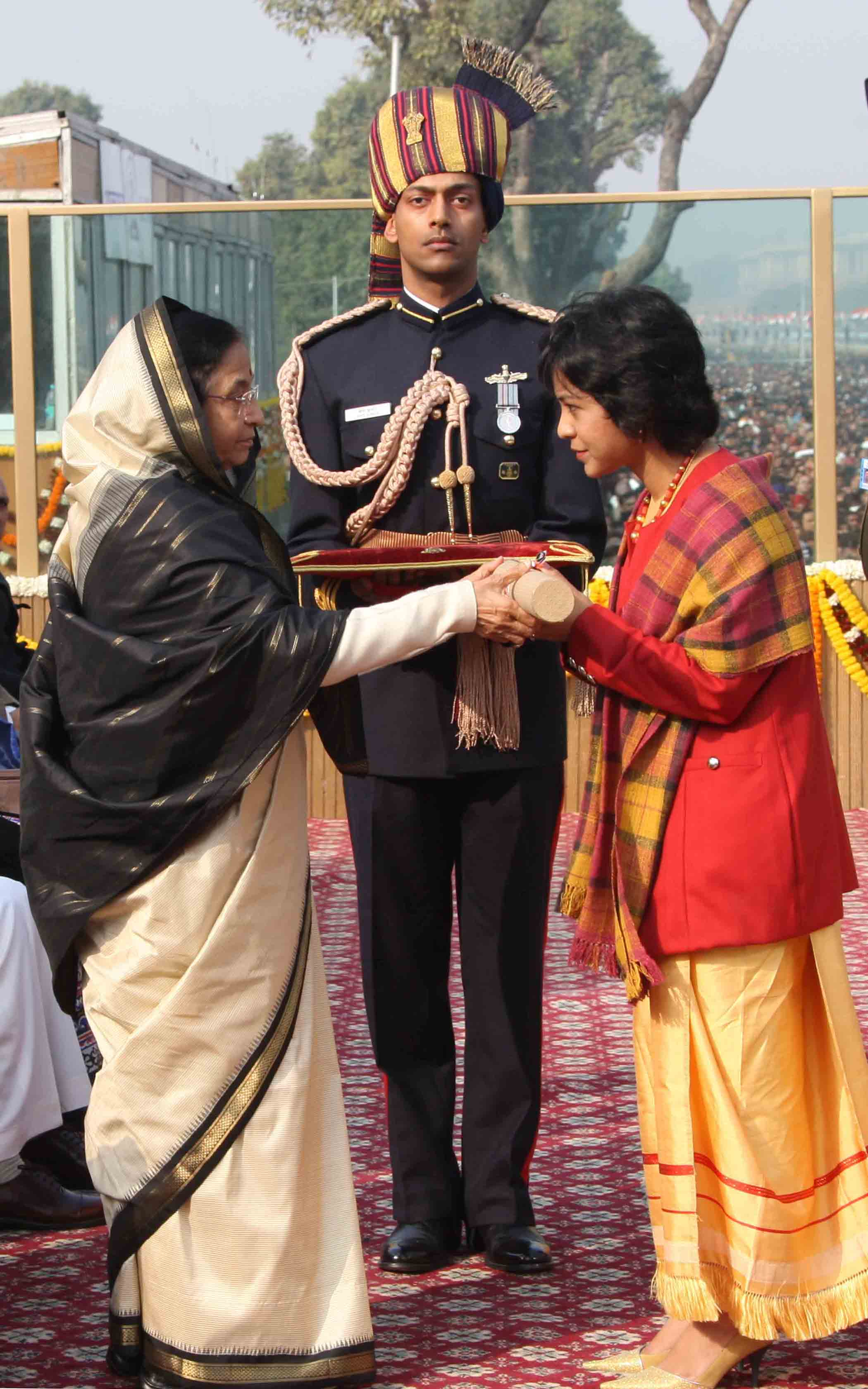
Smt. Sati Mosha Blah receiving Ashoka Chakra awarded to her husband Shri RP Diengdoh (Posthumous) from the President, Smt. Pratibha Devisingh Patil, during the 60th Republic Day Parade-2009, in New Delhi on 26 January 2009

The President of India noted in the Ashoka Chakra citation that Diengdoh displayed exemplary dedication to duty and pre-eminent valour in making the supreme sacrifice while fighting the militants.
