= Rapid Action Force =

Wing of the Central Reserve Police Force of India

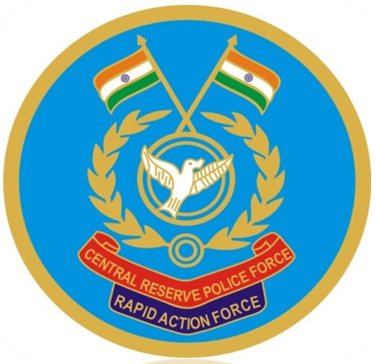
- Emblem of Rapid Action Force
- Common name: RAF
- Motto: "Serving Humanity with Sensitive Policing"

Agency overview
- Formed: 11 November 1991

Jurisdictional structure
- Operations jurisdiction: India
- Governing body: Ministry of Home Affairs (India)

Operational structure
- Headquarters: New Delhi, India
- Minister responsible: Amit Shah, Union Home Minister
- Agency executive: Seema Dhundia, Inspector General of Police
- Parent agency: Central Reserve Police Force

Notables
- Anniversary: 7 October

Website
- crpf.gov.in/Dte/Zone/Directorate-General/RAF-Sector

The Rapid Action Force (RAF), is a specialised rapid reaction wing of the Central Reserve Police Force (CRPF) of India established in October 1992 to deal with riot and crowd control situations.

== History ==
RAF was established on 11 December 1991 by the Union Home Ministry with headquarters in New Delhi. It became fully operational on 7 October 1992, to deal with riots, riot-like situations, crowd control, rescue and relief operations, and related unrest. The first five battalions were operationalized by October 1992 and an additional 5 battalions were added in April 1994.

On 7 October 2003, with 11 years of service, the force was presented with the President's Colour. On 9 November 2013, the RAF Academy of Public Order was established in Meerut, Uttar Pradesh. In 2017, the Indian government approved an additional five battalions to be based in New Delhi, Haryana, Rajasthan, Uttar Pradesh, and Bihar.

== Organisation ==
RAF contingent in a parade

RAF is commanded by an Inspector-General of Police (IGP), functioning at New Delhi. The RAF is divided into three ranges headed by a Deputy Inspector-General of Police (DIGP) in New Delhi, Mumbai, and Dehradun. It has also a specialized training centre "RAPO" (RAF Academy for Public Order) in Meerut, Uttar Pradesh headed by a DIGP. The RAF has a distinctive uniform with a blue-coloured camouflage pattern which symbolizes peace. Its motto is "Serving Humanity with Sensitive Policing".

It currently has 15 specialized trained and equipped battalions, which are numbered 83, 91, 97, 99 to 108, 114 and 194 in the CRPF. Each battalion is headed by a Commanding Officer (CO), an officer of the rank of Commandant. The RAF Battalions of CRPF are located at the following places:

S. No.	State	Location	Unit
1	Rajasthan	Jaipur	83 RAF
2	Uttar Pradesh	Varanasi	91 RAF
3	Karnataka	Shimoga	97 RAF
4	Telangana	Rangareddy	99 RAF
5	Gujarat	Ahmedabad	100 RAF
6	Uttar Pradesh	Prayagraj	101 RAF
7	Maharashtra	Mumbai	102 RAF
8	Delhi	Wazirabad	103 RAF
9	Uttar Pradesh	Aligarh	104 RAF
10	Tamil Nadu	Coimbatore	105 RAF
11	Jharkhand	Jamshedpur	106 RAF
12	Madhya Pradesh	Bhopal	107 RAF
13	Uttar Pradesh	Meerut	108 RAF
14	Bihar	Hajipur Vaishali	114 RAF
15	Haryana	Nuh	194 RAF

A team is the smallest independent functional unit of the force and is commanded by an Inspector. Each team has three components: riot control, tear smoke, and fire. Each company of RAF has one team composed of women personnel to deal with women demonstrators.

The force is equipped with non-lethal weapons for dispersing the crowd with minimum harm and losses. It is always kept in readiness for rapid deployment when the situation so demands and are only deployed by the orders of Ministry of Home Affairs on specific demands from state governments for a short duration.

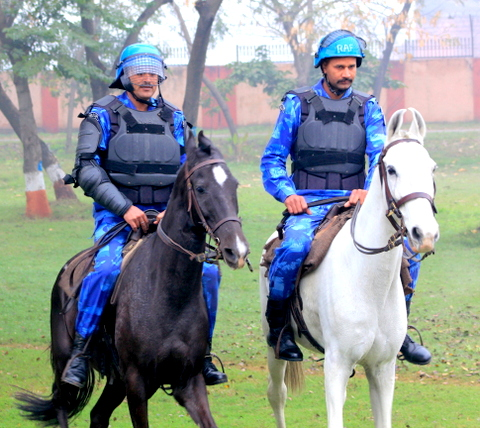
Horse Mounted personnel of the RAF for riot-control

== Role ==
=== Riot and crowd control ===
This unit has been used to deal with communal violence, law and order duty, festival and election duties and agitation.

=== United Nations Peace Keeping Operations ===
The CRPF female and male contingents under the arrangements of RAF are deployed in United Nations Mission in Liberia (UNMIL), Monrovia and Zwedru in UN Peacekeeping mission since 2007–08. CRPF Female Formed Police Unit was the first of its kind in the world, which was deployed under the aegis of UN Peace Keeping Mission.

=== Humanitarian activities ===
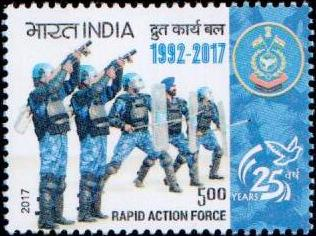
A 2017 stamp dedicated to the 25th anniversary of the Rapid Action Force

RAF has also succeeded in projecting the human face of the Government and built bridges with the public by carrying out prompt rescue and relief operations during floods, earthquakes, cyclones and outbreak of epidemics in various parts of the country.

=== Anti-terror operations ===
Kamlesh Kumari of the 88 Mahila Battalion was posthumously awarded the Ashoka Chakra for her bravery during the 2001 Indian Parliament attack.

RAF was active during the 2002 Swaminarayan Akshardham temple attack in Gandhinagar, Gujarat.

During the November 2008 Mumbai Terror Attacks, RAF was involved in cordoning the areas around the Oberoi Trident and the Taj Mahal hotels.

== Controversies ==
- According to IBTimes UK, Delhi Police deployed the Rapid Action Force and shut multiple central Delhi metro stations in July 2026 to block a planned march by the Cockroach Janata Party over the NEET-UG paper leak scandal, a move that organisers and opposition leaders characterized as suppression of peaceful dissent while authorities cited security concerns.
- During the 2026 Delhi Jantar Mantar protests, the Rapid Action Force (RAF) faced criticism over its handling of demonstrators. In July 2026, an internal RAF departmental inquiry found that some personnel had used "excessive force" against student protesters and concluded that their actions "can't be justified".
