= Narbahadur Thapa =

Former Indian Army soldier

Naik Narbahadur Thapa AC
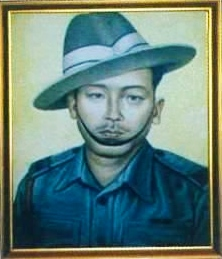
- Born: March 1921 (age 105); Nepal
- Military career
- Allegiance: India
- Branch: British Indian Army; Indian Army
- Service years: 11 November 1940 - ??
- Rank: Naik
- Service number: 10341
- Unit: 5/5 Gorkha Rifles
- Conflicts: Operation Polo
- Awards: Ashoka Chakra

Naik Narbahadur Thapa, AC was an Indian Army soldier who was awarded with the first ever living India's highest peacetime military decoration Ashoka Chakra for his bravery in Operation Polo. He served as a soldier with the 5/5 Gorkha Rifles.
