= Kamlesh Kumari Yadav =

Ashoka Chakra recipient

Kamlesh Kumari Yadav AC
- Police career
- Country: India
- Department: CRPF
- Branch: Bravo Company
- Service years: 1994–2001
- Status: Deceased
- Awards: Ashoka Chakra

Kamlesh Kumari was an Indian constable who served with the Central Reserve Police Force (CRPF) and a recipient of the Ashoka Chakra, the highest possible award conferred during peacetime by the Republic of India. Kamlesh Kumari died on 13 December 2001 after successfully preventing terrorist gunmen and a terrorist suicide bomber from reaching Parliament during the 2001 Indian Parliament attack.

== Career ==
Constable Kamlesh Kumari joined the CRPF in 1994 and was first posted with the elite 104 Rapid Action Force (RAF) in Allahabad. Soon after, she was posted at the 88 Mahila (Women's) Battalion on 12 July 2001. Kumari became part of Bravo Company, the group tasked with securing Parliament when in session.

== 13 December 2001 ==
Kamlesh Kumari was posted at Iron Gate No. 1, next to Building Gate No. 11, of the Parliament House. An Ambassador brand car, bearing the license plate number DL 3C J 1527, drove towards the gate from Vijay Chowk. She was the first security official to approach the car and, realising something was amiss, ran back to her post to seal the gate. The terrorists, with their cover effectively blown and unable to travel further due to Kumari's foresight, opened fire. Eleven bullets struck Kamlesh in the stomach. The attack occurred at 11:50 in the morning.

Kamlesh Kumari alertness prevented a suicide bomber among the terrorists from executing their plan; the closing of Gate No. 1 and the alarm raised gave time for other security personnel to take position and neutralize the would-be bomber.

== Family ==
Kamlesh Kumari Yadav was survived by two daughters, Jyoti Yadav and Shweta Yadav and her husband, Avdhesh Yadav. Kamlesh's family hails from Sikanderpur, Kannauj in Uttar Pradesh. Kamlesh and her family had earlier lived in Vikaspuri, Delhi.

== Honours ==
Constable Kamlesh Kumari was posthumously awarded the nation's highest peacetime Gallantry award, the Ashoka Chakra, by the President of India on Republic Day in 2002 in honour of her bravery and courage. Prime Minister A.B. Vajpayee also paid tribute to her.

Mohammad Afzal, who was determined to have played a key role as a conspirator in the attack by investigators, was convicted and sentenced to death by the Supreme Court of India. Afzal's family had "camped" in New Delhi with the hope of conveying a mercy petition to then President Dr. A.P.J. Abdul Kalam. In response, Kamlesh's surviving family publicly declared that they would return the Ashok Chakra awarded to her if the President were to accept the petition. As the president neither rejected nor accepted the petition, the families of eight security officials who had been honored for their bravery during the attacks (including Kamlesh's) returned their gallantry medals on 13 December 2006, in protest against the delay in execution of Mohammad Afzal.

President Pranab Mukherjee succeeded Pratibha Patil as President on 25 July 2012. In early 2013, he rejected the petition for clemency. Mohammad Afzal was hanged on 9 February 2013 at Tihar Jail at approximately 8:00 am IST. On 30 March 2013, the martyrs' families agreed to accept back the gallantry medals which they had returned in 2006.

== In popular culture ==
Her character was played by actress Shweta Shrivastav in 2025 Hindi film Dhurandhar.

== See also ==
- 2001 Indian Parliament attack
