= Havildar Joginder Singh =

Havildar Joginder Singh AC
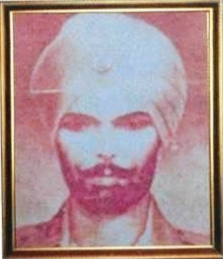
- Portrait of Hav Joginder Singh
- Born: 30 November 1922; Datewas Village, Bathinda District, Punjab, British India
- Died: 24 April 1956 (aged 33); Khujami District, Nagaland, India
- Military career
- Allegiance: British India; India
- Branch: British Indian Army; Indian Army
- Service years: 1940-1956
- Rank: Havildar
- Service number: 18576
- Unit: 2 Sikh
- Awards: Ashoka Chakra

Havildar Joginder Singh, AC (30 November 1922 - 24 April 1956) was an Indian Army Non Commissioned Officer (NCO) who was awarded India's highest peace time military decoration Ashoka Chakra for gallantry in Nagaland.

== Early life ==
Havildar Joginder Singh was born on 30 November 1922 in village Datewas, then part of Bathinda District, Punjab (present-day Mansa District). His father's name was Sardar Sham Singh who was a poor farmer. Belonging to a financially poor family, he did not get the opportunity of an education.

== Military career ==
Havildar Joginder Singh was enrolled in the Indian Army on 30 November 1940 at the young age of 18. After completion of his military training, he was posted to 2 Sikh Regiment. During his Army education, he received the first grade in Indian Army and Map Reading courses. He also attended the Engineer Platoon Commander Course and received ‘BY’ Grading. During his service, he also served in various places like Greece and Africa.

== Naga Hills Encounter ==
In April 1956, Havildar Joginder Singh was posted in Khujami district of Nagaland serving in the 2 Sikh Regiment. The Naga Insurgency was at its peak during this time with insurgents hidden at various positions throughout the hills with the aim to suppress military movements.

On 24 April 1956, Singh was leading a three jeep convoy carrying supplies for a forward post at Phek, in the Naga Hills. After crossing milestone 16, insurgents who had set up traps on the curved mountainous track opened fire and charged the convoy with light machine guns. Havildar Joginder was hit by one of the bullets in his right leg. Though he was wounded, he jumped out of the jeep and ran towards the insurgents to attack. Six of his soldiers also followed him out of their vehicles and moved forward to attack the insurgents. Havlidar Joginder was 25 meters short of the insurgents positions when a bullet hit him in the stomach. Despite being heavily wounded by this point, he continued to move towards the enemy by crawling on the ground and hit the insurgents post with two hand grenades. The other Indian soldiers succeeded in destroying their enemy’s post which had posed a problem for the Indian Army in the area.

Havildar Joginder Singh succumbed to his injuries sustained during combat on the same day. Havildar Joginder's acts were described as “the inspiration for his men to achieve their objective successfully.”

== Ashoka Chakra awardee ==
For his act of bravery and extreme valour he was posthumously awarded India's highest peace time military decoration Ashoka Chakra.
