= List of Vir Chakra award recipients (2020–2029) =

Indian wartime military bravery award

Vir Chakra
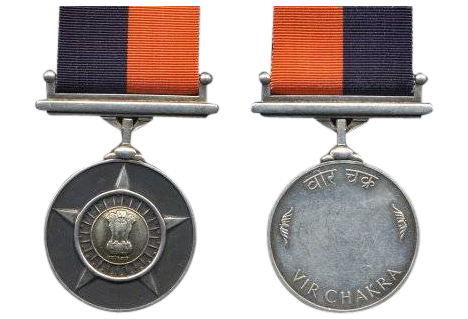
- Vir Chakra and its ribbon, the third highest military decoration of India
- Type: Medal
- Awarded for: Acts of gallantry in the presence of the enemy, whether on land or at sea or in the air.
- Country: Republic of India
- Presented by: Republic of India
- Eligibility: Military Personnel Only
- Post-nominals: VrC
- Status: Currently Awarded
- First award: 1947
- Final award: 2021

Highlights
- Total awarded posthumously: 362
- Total recipients: 1335 (As of 2023)

Precedence
- Next (higher): Ati Vishisht Seva Medal

- Equivalent: Shaurya Chakra

- Next (lower): Yudh Seva Medal

The Vir Chakra (pronunciation: ʋiːɾa tʃakɾa, lit. 'wheel of bravery') is an Indian wartime military bravery award presented for acts of gallantry on the battlefield, on land or in the air or at sea. The list consists of recipients of Vir Chakra awardee from 2020 to 2029.

== Recipients (2020-2029) ==
Five people (4 posthumously) from the Indian Army have been awarded with the chakra from 2020. All of the recipient of the 2021 lists have been awarded Vir Chakra for their exemplary bravery dury Sino Indian Skirmish 2020.

Year	Rank	Name	Regiment	Notes
2021	Naib Subedar	Nuduram Soren	Indian Army	Posthumous
2021	Havildar	K Palani	Indian Army	Posthumous
2021	Havildar	Tejinder Singh	Indian Army	
2021	Naik	Deepak Singh	Indian Army	Posthumous
2021	Sepoy	Gurtej Singh	Indian Army	Posthumous
