= Nirbhay Singh Sisodiya =

Naik Nirbhay Singh AC
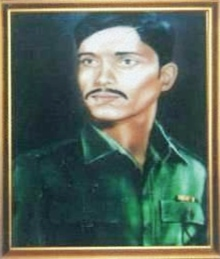
- Portrait of Nk Nirbhay Singh
- Born: Nirbhay Singh Sisodiya; 1 May 1958; Jhalawar, Rajasthan, India
- Died: 6 June 1984 (aged 26); Amritsar, Punjab, India
- Military career
- Allegiance: India
- Branch: Indian Army
- Rank: Naik
- Service number: 4167546
- Unit: 15 Kumaon
- Conflicts: Operation Blue Star
- Awards: Ashoka Chakra

Naik Nirbhay Singh Sisodiya, AC (1 May 1958 – 6 June 1984) was an Indian military Non Commissioned Officer (NCO) with the 15th Battalion of the Kumaon Regiment. For his bravery, he was posthumously awarded the Ashoka Chakra, the highest peacetime military decoration in India on 26 January 1985.

During the Operation Blue Star on 6 June 1984, he provided cover for his company commander from heavy firing by the Sikh militants using medium machine guns. Sensing danger to his company from a light machine gun in a pot hole, Singh charged towards the gun. Although he suffered bullet shots to his legs, he crawled to reach the pot hole and lobbed a grenade into the basement, but exposed himself to heavy firing and succumbed to his injuries.

== Early life ==
Naik Nirbhay Singh was born on 1 May 1958 to Late Mr Nand Singh, who was Aide-de-Camp to the Tehsildar and Mrs Mata Basant Kanwar, a simple and religious lady, in Jhalawar, Rajasthan. Naik Nirbhay Singh was the eighth child amongst a family of five brothers and four sisters. His elder sisters are Shashikala Sisodiya, Hansa Sisodiya and Vijya Sisodiya and the name of two brothers are Kalyan Singh Sisodia and Abhay Sigh Sisodia respectively. He was a keen sportsman and his early education took place in Jhalawar where he passed his IX class from Government Higher Secondary School.

== Military career ==
From childhood, he was determined to join the forces so after his class IX he enrolled himself in the Army and was posted to 15 Kumaon Regiment.

== Operation Blue Star ==
In 1984, Punjab was on its peak on terrorism. The terrorists had captured the sacred Golden Temple. They made the sacred temple as their headquarters. Former honorable prime minister, Mrs. Indira Gandhi, launched Operation Blue Star, military operation in order to establish control and evacuate the temple complex.

During the operation, Singh's company was given the task to clear an important building complex which was heavily fortified and strongly held by fierce terrorists. Naik Nirbhay Singh was chosen as the light machine gun detachment commander of 'A' Company. As the company moved towards, they came under heavy fire from the terrorists. As a result, they had to halt their actions. Singh's brave company commander decided to move towards the building all by himself. Naik Nirbhay Singh set to provide cover to his company commander, plunged forward and mounted a light machine gun. The hidden militants were firing on them from the building. Singh continued to remain in the open and kept firing to provide the cover. While firing, he realized danger to his company commander from a light machine gun mounted in a pothole. He marched towards the porthole, exposing himself to grave danger. In the action, he was hit by bullets in his leg but his objective remained unfettered. After injured, he still crawled towards the porthole and silenced the machine gun with a hand grenade. But in the action, he was hit by a blaze of bullets for the second time. This proved fatal, and he succumbed to his injuries.

Naik Nirbhay did not care about his own safety and made the supreme sacrifice for his nation. He laid down his life in highest traditions of the Indian Army. He lived true to his name, fearless.

== Ashoka Chakra awardee ==
For his extraordinary bravery, cool courage and supreme sacrifice for his nation Naik Nirbhay Singh Sisodiya was posthumously awarded with the Ashoka Chakra, India's highest gallantry award during peacetime.
