= Bhukant Mishra =

Indian army officer (1941–1984)

Major Bhukant Mishra AC
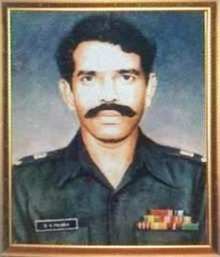
- Portrait OF Maj Bhukant Mishra
- Born: 15 June 1941; Agra, Uttar Pradesh, India
- Died: 6 June 1984 (aged 42); Amritsar, Punjab, India
- Military career
- Allegiance: India
- Branch: Indian Army
- Rank: Major
- Unit: 15 Kumaon
- Conflicts: Operation Blue Star
- Awards: Ashoka Chakra

Major Bhukant Mishra, AC (15 June 1941 – 6 June 1984) was an Indian Army Officer of 15 Kumaon Regiment. He was posthumously awarded the Ashoka Chakra, India's highest military honour, on 26 January 1985 for his actions in Operation Blue Star.
