= Mohit Sharma (soldier) =

Indian Army Special Forces Officer

Major Mohit Sharma AC SM
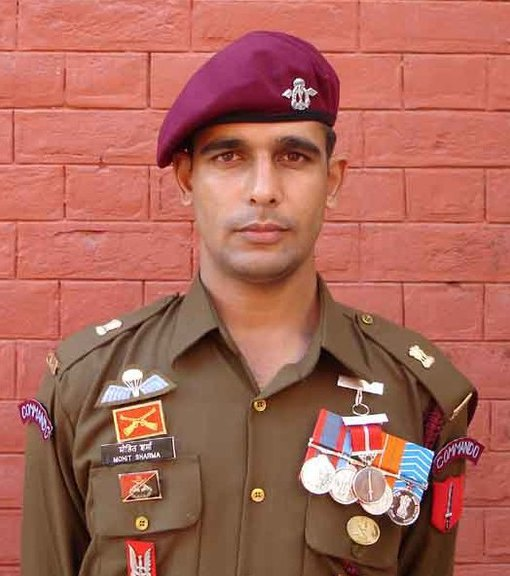
- Born: 13 January 1978; Rohtak, Haryana, India
- Died: 21 March 2009 (aged 31); Hafthrada Forest, Kupwara, Jammu and Kashmir, India
- Alma mater: National Defence Academy; Indian Military Academy
- Military career
- Allegiance: India
- Branch: Indian Army
- Service years: 1999–2009
- Rank: Major
- Service number: IC-59066N
- Units: 1Para (Special Forces); 5 Madras
- Awards: Ashoka Chakra; Sena Medal

Major Mohit Sharma AC SM (13 January 1978 – 21 March 2009) was an Indian Army Officer who was posthumously awarded the Ashoka Chakra, India's highest peace-time military decoration. Sharma was from the elite 1st Para SF.

On 21 March 2009, during an operation in the Hafthrada forest of the Kupwara district of Jammu and Kashmir, Major Sharma was part of a search operation launched by the Army along with Rashtriya Rifles units when militants hiding in natural caves open fire on approaching troops. In the exchange of fire, Major Sharma and three other soldiers were killed, along with three militants. Sharma was later posthumously awarded the Ashoka Chakra, which is the highest peace time military decoration in India. He was awarded two gallantry decorations earlier in his career. The first was the COAS Commendation card for exemplary counter-militancy duties during Operation Rakshak, which was followed by a Sena Medal for gallantry after a covert operation in 2005.

In 2019, Delhi Metro Rail Corporation renamed the Rajendra Nagar metro station in Ghaziabad as Major Mohit Sharma Rajendra Nagar metro station.

== Early life and education ==
His father's name is Rajendra Prasad Sharma and mother's name is Sushila Sharma. He was the second born of the Sharma family. He completed his 12th schooling from Delhi Public School, Ghaziabad in 1995 after which he appeared for NDA Exam. At the same time he got admitted to Shri Sant Gajanan Maharaj College of Engineering, Shegaon, Maharashtra, during which he passed the SSB interview from Bhopal and joined the National Defence Academy (NDA) in December 1995.

== Military career ==
Sharma joined the Indian Military Academy (IMA) in 1998. In IMA, he was appointed Battalion Cadet Adjutant. After graduation, he was included in the 5th Battalion of the Madras Regiment. He was commissioned as a lieutenant in December 1999.

He was engaged in several undercover counterinsurgency operations which involved infiltrating militant outfits under secret identities. In one such operation he infiltrated the Hizbul Mujahideen military outfit under the identity of "Iftikhar Bhatt", even keeping a heavy beard and dressing as a local for his cover. During the operation he collected key intelligence to strike militant targets and also assassinated two high-level militants. He received a Sena Medal for Gallantry for this operation.

Sharma opted for the Para (Special Forces) in December 2002 and he became a trained Para Commando in June 2003. He was promoted as major on 11 December 2005, He was awarded with the Sena Medal for his bravery for an operation he did in March 2004. He was posted as Instructor at Belgaum and was given the responsibility to train the Commandos in Belgaum where he instructed for two years. Mohit Sharma then moved in 2008 to Kashmir where he was killed in action in 2009.

== Ashoka Chakra ==
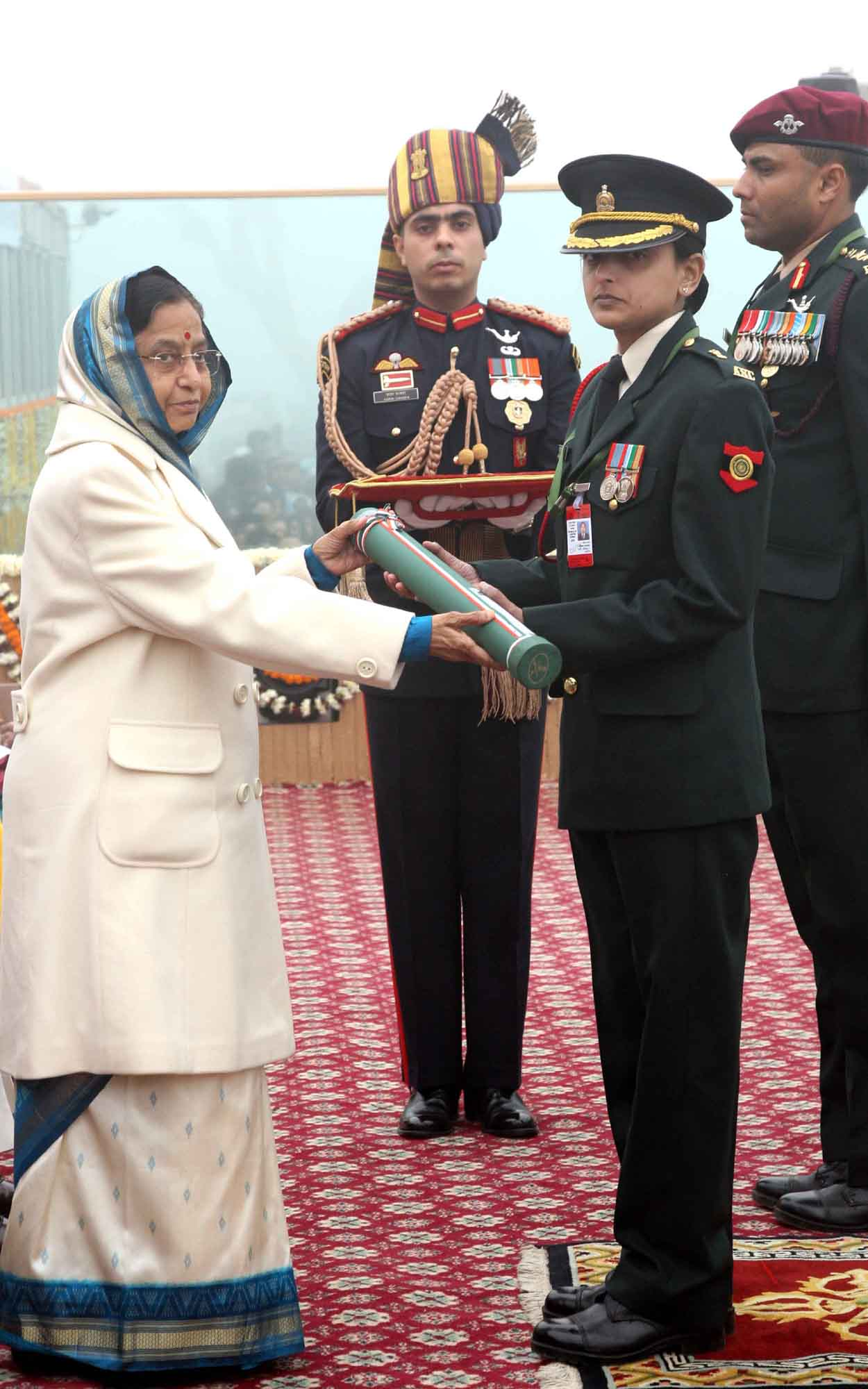
Sharma's wife, Maj Rishima Sharma receiving the Ashok Chakra.

Sharma's unit was stationed in the Kupwara district of J&K in 2009 and frequently participated in operations against militants. On March 21, 2009, the security forces decided to conduct a search and destroy operation based on intelligence concerning a militant infiltration attempt in the Kupwara district. Leading the Bravo Assault Team against the militants who were infiltrating the dense Haphruda Forest was Sharma's responsibility.

Attempting to ambush and overwhelm the team, militants opened heavy fire from three directions as the team manoeuvred stealthily through rugged foliage. As a result of the sudden onslaught in the initial burst, four commandos were critically injured. Sharma crawled forward to save his soldiers. Under continuous enemy fire, he pulled two wounded commandos to safety. Recognizing that the militants were trying to sever contact and move, Sharma threw grenades and eliminated two militants. In the process, he received a gunshot injury to his chest. In spite of the serious injury, he persisted in leading the attack.

As the situation escalated and the surviving militants presented an immediate threat to his forces, Sharma took down two additional militants before succumbing to his wounds. In recognition of Sharma's sacrifice during the Kupwara operation, he received the nation's top peacetime bravery honour, the Ashok Chakra, on 26 January 2010.

== Awards and decorations ==
Ashoka Chakra	Sena Medal	Special Service Medal	Operation Parakram Medal
Sainya Seva Medal	High Altitude Medal	9 Years Long Service Medal	

== See also ==
- Major Mohit Sharma Rajendra Nagar metro station – Metro station in Uttar Pradesh, India
- Sanjog Chhetri – Indian Army Ashoka Chakra recipient (1982–2002)

== In popular culture ==
In the 2025 Hindi-language film Dhurandhar, the character Hamza Ali Mazari (Jaskirat Singh Rangi), played by Ranveer Singh, was speculated to have been based on Major Mohit Sharma's life but the makers of the movie denied such claims. His family approached Delhi High Court, citing concerns about the portrayal of Sharma's private life.
