= Babu Ram =

Indian police officer (1972–2020)

ASI Babu Ram AC
- Born: 15 May 1972; Dharana, Poonch district, Jammu & Kashmir, India
- Died: 29 August 2020 (aged 48); Pantha Chowk, Srinagar, Jammu & Kashmir
- Police career
- Department: Jammu and Kashmir Police
- Service years: 1999–2020
- Rank: Assistant Sub-Inspector of Police
- Awards: Ashoka Chakra

Assistant Sub-inspector Babu Ram, AC (1972–2020) was a Police Officer of the Special Operations Group (SOG) Srinagar, who was awarded the highest peace time gallantry award, the Ashok Chakra.

== Early life ==
Ram was born on 15 May 1972, in Dharana village in the Poonch district of Jammu region's Mendhar district, had aspired to join the armed services since he was a child.

== Police career ==
After completing his education, he was assigned as a constable in the J&K Police in 1999. On 27 July 2002, he was assigned to the Special Operations Group (SOG) in Srinagar, where he participated in numerous anti-terror operations in which a number of hardcore terrorists were killed. During his time in the anti-insurgency unit he took part in 14 battles in which 28 terrorists were killed.

Babu Ram was a frequent frontrunner in counter-terrorist operations and he also received a premature promotion for his gallantry and conscientiousness.

== Ashok Chakra Action ==
J&K Police officers and security forces were checking vehicles travelling through Pantha-Chowk. Three terrorists then arrived on a moped and attacked a paramilitary force member who was standing by the highway, taking his weapon and opening fire on the police and security forces indiscriminately. After the attack, the terrorists entered Dhobhi Mohalla in Pantha-Chowk. Immediately, the area was cordoned off and search operation was launched. ASI Ram was part of the advance party who launched an assault against holed up terrorists, the terrorists then opened fire at the joint search party, triggering an encounter. The encounter ended with the elimination of three Lashkar-e-Taiba (LeT) terrorists, including a commander. However, Ram was killed in this exchange.

== Ashok Chakra ==
On the occasion of India's 75th Independence Day, the late recipient was awarded the Ashok Chakra by then-President Ram Nath Kovind in recognition of his exceptional courage, dedication, and conscientiousness. The award was posthumously presented to the recipient's family by the President of India on Republic Day 2022.
