= Surinder Singh (Ashoka Chakra) =

Ashoka Chakra recipient

Subedar Surinder Singh AC
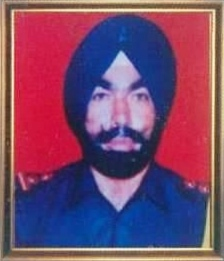
- Portrait of Sub Surinder Singh
- Died: 3 March 2002; Rajouri, Jammu and Kashmir, India
- Military career
- Allegiance: India
- Branch: Indian Army
- Rank: Subedar
- Service number: JC - 498232A
- Unit: 3 SIKH
- Awards: Ashoka Chakra

Subedar Surinder Singh, AC was an Indian military Junior Commissioned Officer (JCO) with the 3rd Battalion of the Sikh Regiment. He was posthumously awarded India's highest peace time military decoration Ashoka Chakra.

== Military career ==
Subedar Surinder Singh was a soldier of Sikh Regiment of Indian Army. During the year 2002, he was serving in the 3rd Battalion of the Sikh Regiment.

On 3 March 2002, he single-handedly killed four terrorists near the Line of Control in the Rajouri sector of Jammu and Kashmir. Singh killed one of them while they were just a few metres away from the Line of Control. At this, the terrorists dispersed into the jungles and Singh led a search for them. He crawled forward to a boulder from where gunshots were fired at the soldiers. He shot dead one more terrorist that pounced upon him. The terrorist hid in a house nearby, but Singh climbed on the roof of the house and blew it up with grenades. During the firing that followed, the terrorist hurled a grenade at Singh from which he suffered splinter injuries. Unmindful of his injuries, Singh killed two more terrorists. Later while being evacuated from the place, Singh succumbed to his injuries. His team killed two more terrorists and eliminated the threat.

== Ashoka Chakra awardee ==
For his bravery, Singh was posthumously awarded the Ashoka Chakra, the highest peace time military decoration in India.
