= Jas Ram Singh =

Ashoka Chakra recipient

Lieutenant Colonel Jas Ram Singh AC
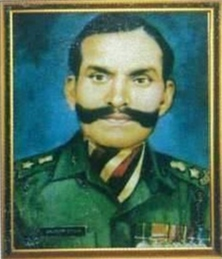
- Portrait of Lieutenant Colonel Jas Ram Singh
- Born: March 1, 1935 (age 91); Bhabokra Village, Bulandshahr, Uttar Pradesh, India
- Military career
- Allegiance: India
- Branch: Indian Army
- Rank: Lieutenant Colonel
- Service number: EC-53763 (emergency); SL-1687 (special list)
- Unit: 16 Rajput Regiment
- Awards: Ashoka Chakra

Lieutenant Colonel Jas Ram Singh, AC (1 March 1935) is a retired Indian Army Officer. He is a recipient of the Ashoka Chakra, India's highest peacetime military decoration.

== Early life ==
Lt Col Jas Ram Singh was born in Bhabokra Village, Bulandshahr, Uttar Pradesh, India on 1 March 1935. His father's name was Shri Badan Singh who was a simple farmer. He was got his primary education in another village. After he joined NREC in Khurja for his higher education.

== Military career ==
He joined in Indian Army as a Signalman. Later he joined as an instructor in Army Education Corps. On 13 October 1963, he received an emergency commission via the OTS Madras and became an Indian Army officer in the 16th Battalion of the Rajput Regiment. He was promoted lieutenant on 13 October 1965.

== Ashoka Chakra awardee and later career ==
For his bravery in Naga Insurgency in 1968, Jas Ram Singh was awarded India's highest peace time gallantry award Ashoka Chakra. On 30 October 1969, he was granted a permanent commission as a lieutenant in the Special List of the Indian Army with seniority from 29 April 1967 (seniority as second lieutenant from 29 April 1965 and seniority for pay from 13 October 1963). He was promoted to captain on 29 April 1972, and was further promoted to major on 7 February 1980. He retired as an honorary lieutenant-colonel on 28 February 1990.
