= Rajiv Kumar Joon =

Recipient of Ashoka Chakra and Shaurya Chakra

Major Rajiv Kumar Joon AC, SC
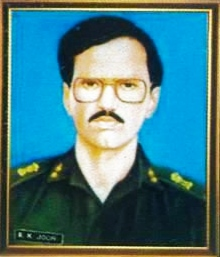
- Portrait of Maj Rajiv Kumar Joon, AC, SC
- Born: 5 December 1969
- Died: 16 September 1994 (aged 24)
- Military career
- Allegiance: India
- Branch: Indian Army
- Service years: 1991 - 1994
- Rank: Major
- Service number: IC-50443X
- Unit: 22 Grenadiers
- Awards: Ashoka Chakra; Shaurya Chakra

Major Rajiv Kumar Joon, AC, SC was a highly decorated Officer in the Indian Army. He was posthumously awarded the Ashoka Chakra, India's highest peace-time military decoration. He was previously decorated with the Shaurya Chakra, the third-highest peacetime military decoration.

== Early life and education ==
Rajiv was born on 5 December 1969 in Gaddi Kheri Village in Rohtak district in Haryana to Dharam Singh Joon and Shanti Devi, the eldest among their six children - 2 boys and 4 girls. In 1980, with the death of his father, 11 year-old Rajiv shouldered responsibility of the family. He attended the Sir Chhotu Ram memorial public school in Rohtak and later completed his schooling from Sainik School, Kunjpura. In 1987, he joined the National Defence Academy, Pune.

== Army career ==
Rajiv graduated from the Indian Military Academy in 1991 and was commissioned a second lieutenant in the 22nd battalion The Grenadiers (22 Grenadiers) on 8 June 1991. In September 1992, 22 Grenadiers was inducted into Jammu and Kashmir for Counter insurgency operations. Joon was promoted lieutenant on 8 June 1993.

On 16 April 1994, as a young Captain, Rajiv led a Ghatak Force and eliminated 3 terrorists in an encounter. He was awarded the Shaurya Chakra for this operation.

=== Ashoka Chakra ===
Citation

On 16 September 1994, a search party under Major Rajiv Kumar Joon carried out cordon and search operation in village Arijan Dessar in district Anantnag of Jammu and Kashmir.

At 1300 hours Major Rajiv Kumar Joon, discovered two militants hiding inside a house in a wall between the door and the ceiling of the room. The hiding militants were persuaded to come out but they sprang out of the hideout firing indiscriminately all over the room and at the search party located at the doorway, injuring a member of the search party.

Major Rajiv Kumar Joon, realising the gravity of the situation, immediately ordered his search party to cover and engage the militants. The trapped militants jumped into the basement of the house and brought heavy volume of fire on the search party from an opening. Major Rajiv Kumar Joon, sensing that his comrades could not engage the well-entrenched militants effectively from their location, crawled up to the loophole on the outer side of the basement at great risk to his personal safety, lobbed two hand grenades into the loophole, and fired into it killing one hard core Pakistan trained militant. The other militant continued firing from the corner of the basement with renewed vigour.

At this moment, Major Rajiv Kumar Joon, risking his life for the safety of his comrades, daringly approached the loophole to effectively engage and neutralize the concealed militant. In this closest of the close encounters, the Major and the militant came face to face with each other. The latter having the advantage of darkness, fired at Major Rajiv Kumar Joon injuring him grievously on the throat damaging his chest.

Major Rajiv Kumar Joon, grievously wounded and profusely bleeding, refused to move back and in a final bid sprayed bullets all over the basement killing the militant. Major Rajiv Kumar Joon single handedly killed both the armed militants saving the lives of his comrades. The two killed militants were later identified as Bashir Ahmed Padar alias Nur-Ur-Haq, self styled company commander of Hizbul Mujahideen and the assassin Ex cabinet Minister of Jammu and Kashmir and Mushtang Ahmed Khande 'Madassar'. Two AK 56 rifles with 3 magazines AK 56 and 22 rounds of ammunition were also recovered in this operation.
