= Sandeep Sankhla =

Indian Army officer

Captain Sandeep Shankla AC
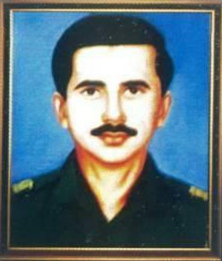
- Born: 3 January 1964; Hamirpur, Himachal Pradesh, India
- Died: 8 August 1991 (aged 27); Kupwara, Jammu and Kashmir, India
- Military career
- Allegiance: India
- Branch: Indian Army
- Service years: 1986-1991
- Rank: Captain
- Service number: IC-43956K
- Unit: 18 DOGRA
- Awards: Ashoka Chakra

Captain Sandeep Shankla (3 January 1964 – 8 August 1991) was an Indian Army officer who was posthumously awarded India's highest peacetime gallantry award, the Ashoka Chakra, for acts in Jammu and Kashmir.

== Early life ==
Shankla was born in Hamirpur district, Himachal Pradesh, he was the son of an army veteran, Lt Col J.S. Kanwar, and Manju Kanwar.

== Military career ==
From childhood, Shankla wanted to follow in the footsteps of his father and join the armed forces. He was commissioned a second lieutenant on 14 June 1986 into 18 Dogra Regiment. He was promoted lieutenant on 14 June 1988 and to captain on 14 June 1991, less than two months before his death.

== Kupwara operation ==
During 1991, Captain Sandeep Shankla’s unit, 18 Dogra was deployed in Kupwara of the J & K area for anti-insurgency operations. On 8 Aug 1991, Captain Sandeep Shankla’s unit had received credible information from intelligence sources about the presence of terrorists in Zafarkhani village in Kupwara district. A decision was taken by the security forces to launch a search and destroy operation to nab the terrorists under the leadership of Capt Sandeep Shankla. Capt Sandeep along with his soldiers reached the suspected area and launched a search and cordon operation. The terrorists fired at the troops on being cornered and challenged. A fierce gun battle ensued thereafter with a heavy exchange of fire from both sides. During the crossfire, one of the soldiers got injured and Capt Sandeep realizing the danger to his life crawled and dragged him to safety while eliminating one terrorist. The other terrorist then lobbed two grenades at Capt Sandeep, but in a rare show of courage, he hurled one of the grenades back at the attackers. However, during this process, Capt Sandeep sustained splinter and bullet injuries. But he kept engaging with the enemy till he lost his consciousness. He later succumbed to his injuries and was martyred. The operation led by Capt Sandeep resulted in the elimination of 9 terrorists and in addition 22 of them were apprehended. Capt Sandeep was a valiant soldier and a gritty officer who led from the front like a true military leader. Married just 6 months earlier, Capt Sandeep laid down his life at the age of 27 years, in the service of the nation.

== Ashoka Chakra awards ==
Captain Sandeep Shankla was given the nation’s highest peacetime gallantry award, "Ashok Chakra" for his outstanding courage, devotion to duty and supreme sacrifice. He is survived by his father Lt Col JS. Kanwar (retd), mother Smt Manju Kanwar and a younger brother.

== Legacy ==
The Panchkula municipal corporation has renamed the Sector 2 roundabout as Shaheed Major Sandeep Sankhla chowk.
