= Suhas Biswas =

Ashoka Chakra recipient (1924–1957)

Flight Lieutenant Suhas Biswas AC
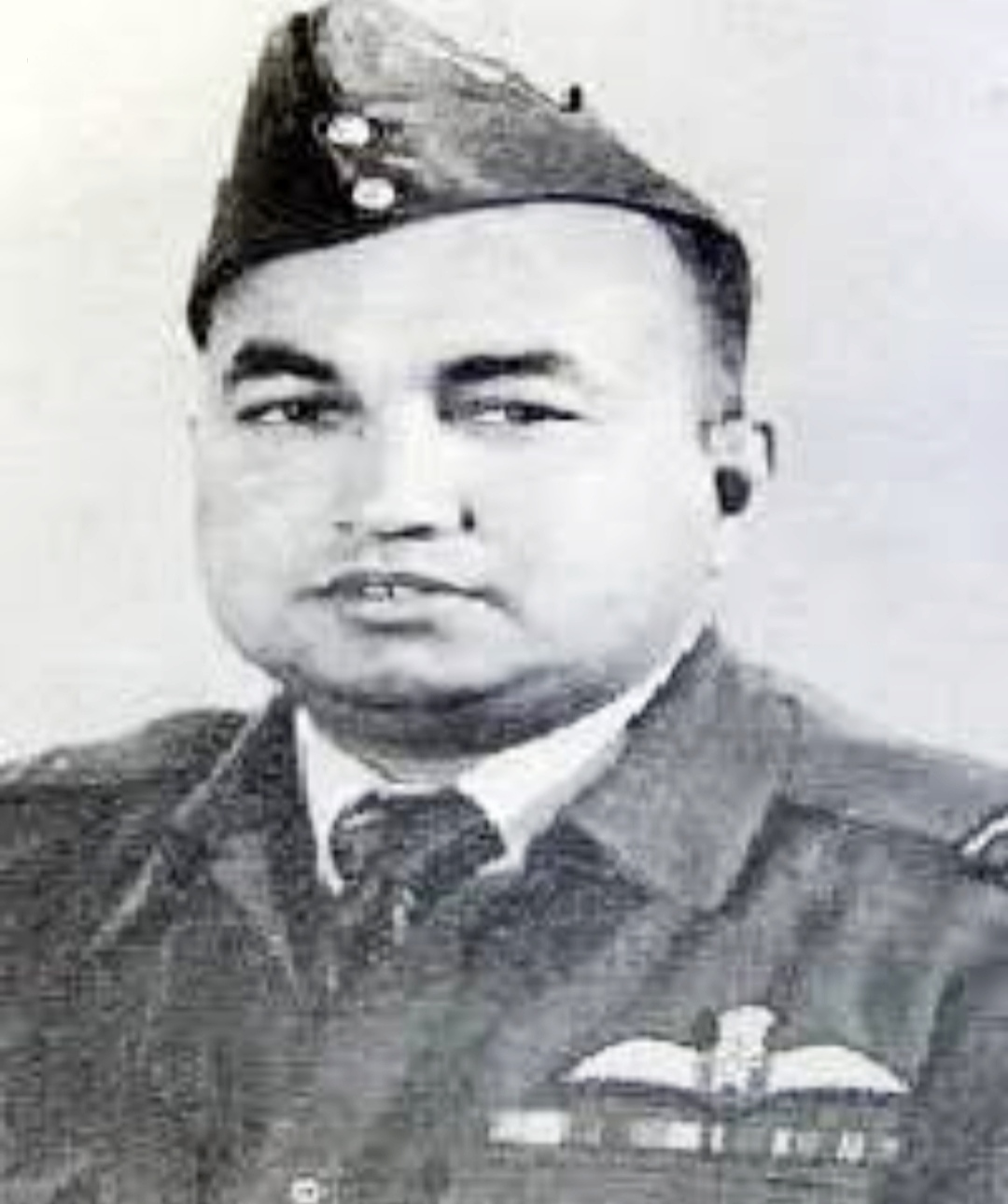
- Born: 9 September 1924; Calcutta, British India
- Died: 1 September 1957 (aged 32); Nilgiri mountains range
- Military career
- Allegiance: British Raj; India
- Branch: Royal Indian Air Force; Indian Air Force
- Service years: 1944-1957
- Rank: Flight Lieutenant
- Awards: Ashoka Chakra

Suhas Biswas, AC (9 September 1924 – 1 September 1957) was a flight lieutenant in the Indian Air Force who was the first Indian Air Force officer to be awarded the Ashoka Chakra, India's highest peacetime military award, in 1953. He was also the first person from West Bengal to receive the award.

== Early life ==
Biswas was born in a Bengali Christian family in Kolkata, West Bengal, the son of Samuel and Diana Biswas. After completing his education Biswas joined the Indian Air Force as a pilot in 1944 and became a commissioned officer.

== Credits ==
In 1952 Biswas was working in a communication flight unit in Lucknow. On 3 February 1952 senior army officials were returning to New Delhi after an official visit. Biswas was in control of their aircraft. Soon after it took off a crew member observed an engine malfunction; subsequently a fire broke out. Biswas first tried to extinguish it, but it was getting difficult to control the aircraft. He made a belly landing at Sandila village in Uttar Pradesh and saved the lives of all the passengers. Biswas was awarded the Ashoka Chakra, India's highest peacetime military decoration.

== Death ==
Biswas died in a crash on 1 September 1957 in the Nilgiri Mountains while flying a Dakota aircraft towards Mangalore on an operational mission.
