= Pollur Mutthuswamy Raman =

Ashoka Chakra recipient

Second Lieutenant Pollur Mutthuswamy Raman AC
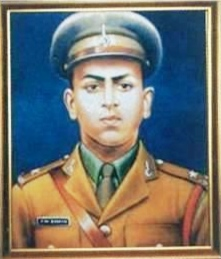
- Portrait of 2nd Lt PM Raman
- Born: 4 December 1934; Cannanore, Madras Presidency, British India (now Kannur, Kerala, India)
- Died: 3 June 1956 (aged 21); Chephema village, Nagaland, India
- Military career
- Allegiance: India
- Branch: Indian Army
- Service years: 1955-1956
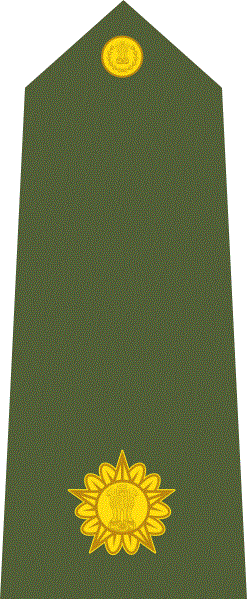
- Rank: Second Lieutenant
- Service number: IC-7415
- Unit: 3 Sikh LI
- Awards: Ashoka Chakra

Second Lieutenant Pollur Mutthuswamy Raman, AC (4 December 1934 - 3 June 1956) was an Indian Army officer who was posthumously awarded India's highest peace time military decoration Ashoka Chakra for his gallant act in Nagaland. He was an alumnus of prestigious institution National Defence Academy - Alpha Squadron.

== Early life ==
Second Lieutenant Pollur Mutthuswamy Raman was born the son of an Army officer, Major Mutthuswamy from the Army Medical Corps and Mrs Savitri. Second Lieutenant Raman was the second among seven siblings. Raman completed his earlier education in Burma. Later he studied from Saraswati High School and Wadia college Pune. He was a brilliant student and soft-spoken and was very much liked by teachers and students alike. Raman completed his SSC examination in 1950. When he was in his first year at college, he got selected in the prestigious defence academy National Defence Academy.

== Military career ==
On 4 June 1955, he was commissioned into the Sikh Light Infantry as Second Lieutenant at the age of 21. As his first posting Second Lieutenant Raman got posted to North East frontier Agency, (NEFA) the present day Arunachal Pradesh.

== Nagaland Operation ==
From intelligence sources, Second Lieutenant Raman's unit received information about the presence of Naga militants in Chephema village in Nagaland on 2 June 1956. After the critical situation, it was decided to launch an operation. As per the plan, consequently a team led by Raman into action in the early morning of 3 June 1956. At 5 in the morning Raman and his troops reached the suspected area. Soon the troops spotted the militants, who opened fire at them on being challenged. The militants were heavily armed. It was fog, it was very difficult to ascertain the positions of the militants. Suddenly Second Lieutenant Raman spotted the movement in a near hut and rushed towards it. He fired and killed two militants. One of militants threw a hand grenade at Raman but he escape the place in the right time. Raman continued to fire and killed one more militant before he was surrounded by militants from all the sides. Threw another grenade towards him which blew one yard from his and wounding him. Causing panic among the militants, he continued his onslaught. Some of the militants flew from the place in sensing defeat. But Raman chased them and killed one militant. One of the militant hiding on a place, fired bullets on Raman which severely injuring him. He threw a grenade at another militant killing him. Raman later succumbed to his injuries. He was martyred for his nation. His bravery and self sacrifice actions inspired his troops. The troops destroyed the den of militants and completing the task successfully.

== Ashoka Chakra awardee ==
Second Lieutenant Pollur Mutthuswamy Raman was awarded India's highest peace time gallantry award, ” Ashok Chakra” for his rawan courage, leadership and supreme sacrifice for his nation.
