= Bachittar Singh (soldier) =

Soldier in Indian Army

Havildar Bachittar Singh AC
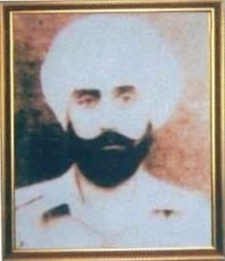
- Portrait of Hav Bachittar Singh
- Born: 10 January 1917; Lobo, Punjab, India
- Died: 13 September 1948 (aged 31); Maharashtra, Naldurg, India
- Military career
- Allegiance: India
- Branch: Indian Army
- Service years: 1934-1948
- Rank: Havildar
- Service number: 13730
- Unit: 2 Sikh
- Conflicts: Operation Polo
- Awards: Ashoka Chakra

Havildar Bachittar Singh, AC (10 January 1917 - 13 September 1948) was a soldier in Indian Army who was posthumously awarded the highest peacetime military decoration award, Ashoka Chakra, for conspicuous bravery, indomitable spirit and supreme sacrifice, becoming the first Indian to receive this award.

== Operation Polo : 13 Sep 1948 ==
When Nizam of Hyderabad refused to join the Indian republic against the wishes of the people, India launched a police operation named "Operation Polo" on 13 Sep 1948. 2 Sikh, the killing force of Sikh Regiment’s second battalion, was given the most important task in Naldurg area. Havaldar Bachittar Singh was leading the platoon.

At around 4 am, the B company of the platoon set up blockades on the road. When two vehicles were seen approaching his position, Hav Bachittar Singh ordered his soldiers to fire on the approaching vehicles. There was a heavy exchange of fire, but Singh, in a show of bravery and leadership, finally captured both the vehicles and their escorts.

On the same day, enemy soldiers took secure positions and attacked his platoon. Hav Bachittar Singh, with great skill and determination, led the counterattack on the enemy forces. Hav Bachittar Singh was moving ahead in the face of the enemy, and when he was about 30 yards away from the target, he got hit by an LMG that burst in his thigh and fell. Despite being in critical condition, Hav Bachittar Singh crawled forward and threw two grenades at the LMG post and silenced it. Even though Hav Bachittar Singh was severely injured, he refused to leave the battlefield and kept motivating his men to press on with the attack.

Inspired by his courage and leadership, his platoon finally achieved the objective; however, Hav Bachittar Singh succumbed to his injuries and was martyred. Hav Bachittar Singh was given nation’s first highest gallantry award during peacetime ,"Ashok Chakra" for his conspicuous bravery, indomitable spirit and supreme sacrifice.
