= Vijay Jagirdar =

Ashoka Chakra recipient

Vijay Jagirdar AC
- Born: Jamuna Nagar, Indore, Madhya Pradesh, India
- Died: 1 November 1984; Jamuna Nagar, Indore, Madhya Pradesh, India
- Cause of death: Mob lynching
- Citizenship: India
- Known for: Saving his neighbour's family during the 1984 anti-Sikh riots
- Awards: Ashoka Chakra

Vijay Jagirdar, AC, was posthumously awarded India's highest peacetime gallantry award, the Ashoka Chakra, for his exemplary bravery in saving his neighbour's family during the 1984 anti-Sikh riots in Indore.

== Early life ==
Vijay Jagirdar was a resident of Jamuna Nagar, Indore, Madhya Pradesh.

== Riots ==
Following the assassination of Indira Gandhi by her Sikh bodyguards in 1984, several mobs initiated the 1984 anti-Sikh riots, which quickly turned violent across India. On the evening of 1 November 1984, a mob of about 150 people attacked the house of Balbir Singh, a neighbour of Vijay Jagirdar. The ferocious mob, armed with knives and sticks, sought to kill Balbir Singh and his family. During this violence, Jagirdar's family, who lived opposite Lalbagh Palace, gave shelter to the Sikh family. Seeing the gravity of the situation, Jagirdar came forward to confront the mob. He pleaded with them not to harm the innocent Balbir Singh and his family. However, the mob ignored his request. When Jagirdar tried to forcibly stop them, he was severely beaten, losing consciousness. He was rushed to the hospital, but succumbed to his injuries within half an hour.

== Award ==
Jagirdar sacrificed his life to save his neighbour's family from a ferocious mob, without regard for his own safety. He was posthumously awarded the Ashoka Chakra.
