= Khadka Bahadur Limbu =

Indian Army officer

Subedar Major Khadka Bahadur Limbu AC, MC
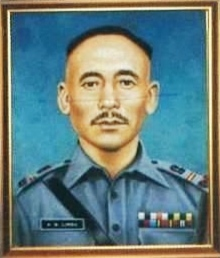
- Born: Imphal, Manipur
- Died: 26 April 1961; Nagaland, India
- Military career
- Allegiance: (United Kingdom) British Empire; India
- Branch: British Indian Army Indian Army
- Service years: 1929–1961
- Rank: Subedar Major
- Service number: JC – 30385
- Unit: 8 Assam Rifles
- Conflicts: World War II; Burma Campaign; Nagaland Insurgency †
- Awards: Ashoka Chakra; Military Cross

Khadka Bahadur Limbu was a Junior commissioned officer of the Indian Army, who was killed in action in Nagaland. He was posthumously awarded Ashoka Chakra, India's highest peacetime gallantry award.

== Early life ==
Bahadur was born to Mr. Arthvir Limbu in Mantri Village under the city Imphal of Manipur. After completing education, he enlisted for the army.

== Military career ==
Bahadur was commissioned in the 8th Battalion of Assam Rifles in 1929.

As a soldier of British Army, he fought in the World War II and had participated in the Burma Campaign. For his bravery in the war, he was given Military Cross, the third highest gallantry award of United Kingdom. After the Partition of India, he joined the Indian Army.

In 1961, as a platoon commander, he was ordered to capture a heavily guarded position of the enemies. He led his team and attacked the enemy bunker, killing at least five insurgents. During the exchange of fire, he was heavily wounded but didn't stop. He kept fighting against the insurgents and died due to the injury. For his gallantry actions, he was later awarded the Ashoka Chakra.
