= Bhure Lal =

Shri Bhure Lal AC
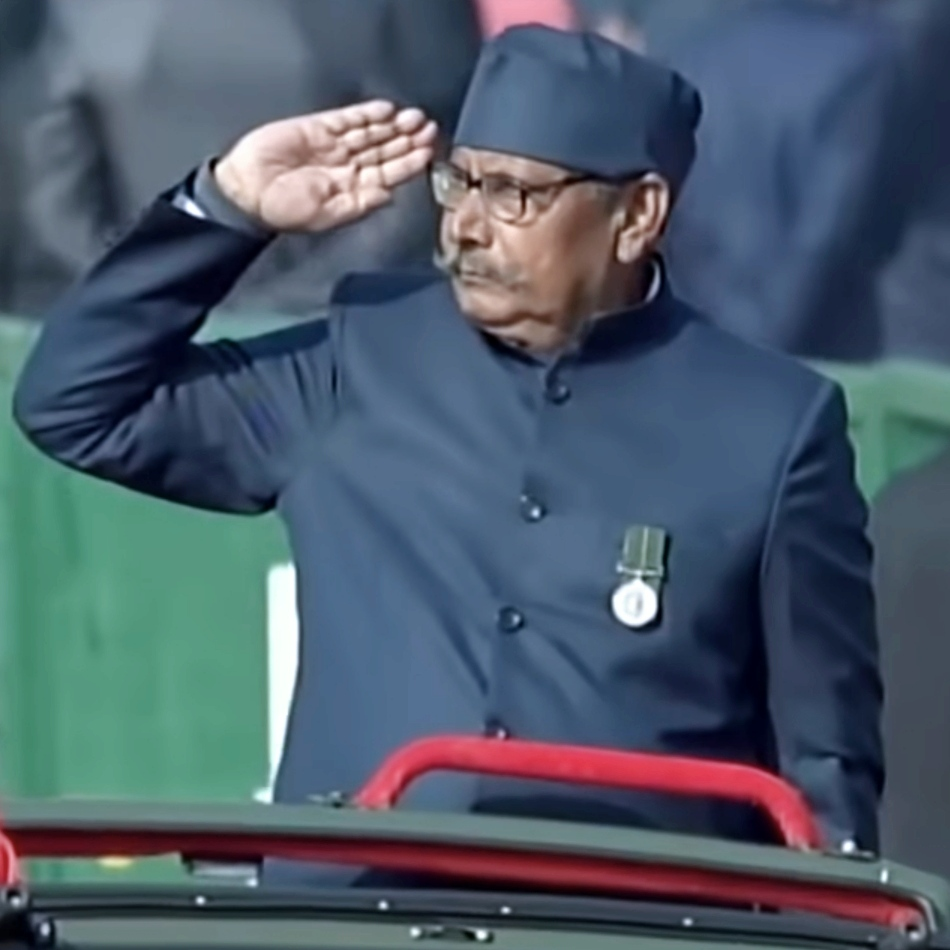
- Lal during Republic day parade 2019
- Born: March 20, 1938; Bajaranggarh Village, Guna district, Madhya Pradesh
- Citizenship: India
- Occupation: Police
- Father: Shri Nanhulal
- Awards: Ashoka Chakra

Bhure Lal, AC (20 March 1938) was a police personnel of Madhya Pradesh Police who was awarded India's highest peacetime gallantry award Ashoka Chakra. He became the first serving state policeman to be awarded this honour.

== Early life ==
Shri Bhurelal was born on 20 March 1938 at Bajarangarh village of Guna district, Madhya Pradesh. His father's name was Sri Nanhulal.

== Police career ==
Shri Bhurelal joined Madhya Pradesh Police on 20 June 1965. He served the police department for 7 years.

== Gallant act ==
There was a reign of terror of a notorious dacoit Nahar Singh in the surrounding areas of Guna district of Madhya Pradesh. Nahar Singh used to give a tough time to the police. He used to loot villages. There was news that on the nights of 14 and 15 July, notorious dacoit Nahar Singh, with his group, was hiding in Gindkho forest. To check the truth behind this news, Sri Bhurelal himself decided to go to forest. This was a very dangerous step, but he went ahead and found out it to be true and Nahar Singh was hiding in that forest. Shri Bhurelal informed about this to his division. Police took some time for preparation. They were alert that the dacoits should not leave forest. Shri Bhurelal again went into the forest at dark hour of night, taking his gun with him. Putting his life at stake, he reached almost near to the dacoits. Nahar Singh got to know of his location and he fired at Sri Bhurelal. Sri Bhurelal was very agile and that time he was quite alert as well, so he dodged it and counter attacked the dacoits. His aim was perfect and Nahar Singh got shot by his bullet and fell down. Nahar Singh's comrades tried to flee, but Bhurelal pounced on them swiftly. Meanwhile, the police also arrived at the scene and arrested all the dacoits.

== Ashoka Chakra awardee ==
Shri Bhurelal displayed his courage and swiftness and successfully managed to kill Dacoit Nahar Singh and get his comrades arrested. He was awarded with Ashoka Chakra for his bravery and courage.
