= Baij Nath Singh =

Ashoka Chakra recipient

Shri Baij Nath Singh AC
- Born: Chachipura Village, Bhind district, Madhya Pradesh, India
- Died: October 22, 1969; Chahipura Village, Bhind district, Madhya Pradesh, India
- Citizenship: India
- Father: Shri Rup Singh
- Awards: Ashoka Chakra

Shri Baij Nath Singh, AC was an Indian civilian who was posthumously awarded India's highest peace time gallantry award, Ashoka Chakra.

== Early life ==
Shri Rup Singh's son, Shri Baij Nath Singh was born in Rajput family in Chahipura village of Bhind district of Madhya Pradesh. In his family, there was a tradition of serving the Army.

== Ashoka Chakra awardee ==
On 22 October 1969, dacoit Saru Singh and others killed Sri Mohar Singh and Sri Uday Singh of Malpura village. Citizens of Malpura and Rahauli village attacked the dacoits, causing them to flee, but not before another villager was killed. Baij Nath Singh followed the dacoits for 1 km and engaged them in gunfire for a sustained period before he was eventually overwhelmed and killed. For his bravery, he was posthumously awarded Ashoka Chakra.
