= Ashoka Chakra (military decoration) =

India's highest peacetime military decoration

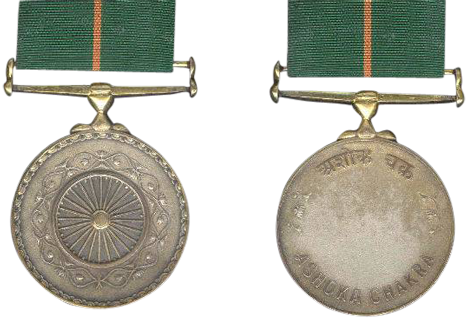
- Ashoka Chakra and its ribbon
- Type: Medal
- Awarded for: Most conspicuous bravery, or some act of daring or pre-eminent act of valour or self-sacrifice
- Description: India's highest peacetime military decoration
- Country: India
- Presented by: Government of India
- Eligibility: Members of Indian Armed Forces, territorial army, militia and any other lawfully constituted forces; Members of nursing services of the armed forces; Civilians and members of police including central para-military forces and Railway Protection Force
- Post-nominals: AC
- Status: active
- Established: 1952; 74 years ago
- First award: 1952
- Final award: 2026

Highlights
- Total awarded posthumously: 68
- Total recipients: 87

Precedence
- Next (higher): Bharat Ratna

- Equivalent: Param Vir Chakra (Note: Though the Ashoka Chakra is placed below the Param Vir Chakra in the precedence, it is considered as a peacetime equivalent of Param Vir Chakra.)

- Next (lower): Padma Vibhushan

The Ashoka Chakra (lit. 'Wheel of Ashoka') is India's highest award for peacetime gallantry. It is the peacetime equivalent of the Param Vir Chakra and is awarded for the "most conspicuous bravery or some daring or pre-eminent valour or self-sacrifice". The decoration may be awarded either to military personnel or civilians by the Government of India.

The circular medal consists of Ashoka Chakra surrounded by a lotus wreath on the front. The obverse consists of "Ashoka Chakra" written in Devanagari along the upper edge on the medal and in English along the lower rim. It is suspended by a straight bar suspender from a green ribbon with a central saffron stripe.

As of 2026, there have been 87 recipients of the award. Of these, 68 have been posthumous recipients, and 17 have been civilians. Havildar Bachittar Singh of the Indian Army was the first recipient of the award, in 1952. D. K. Jatar, a pilot of Air India's Kashmir Princess was the first civilian recipient of the award, in 1955. Only two women have ever been awarded the Ashok Chakra, flight attendant Neerja Bhanot in 1987 and police constable Kamlesh Kumari in 2001. Two non-Indians, cosmonauts Gennadi Strekalov and Yuri Malyshev were given the award in 1984. Indian Air Force officer Shubhanshu Shukla, decorated in 2026, is the most recent awardee.

== Description ==
The medal was originally established on 4 January 1952 as the "Ashoka Chakra, Class I" by the President of India deemed to have been in effect from 15 August 1947. It was the highest class of the three gallantry awards established at the time. In January 1967, the award was renamed as Ashok Chakra with the other two classes renamed as Kirti Chakra and Shaurya Chakra respectively. The awards are given out twice a year– during the Republic Day and Independence Day. Though the Ashok Chakra is placed below the Param Vir Chakra in the order of precedence, it is considered to be the peace time equivalent of the Param Vir Chakra. The award includes a medal, and a monthly stipend of ₹12,000 (US$130).

== Eligibility ==
The Ashok Chakra can be awarded to all enlisted officers of the Indian Armed Forces including the Indian Army, Indian Airforce, and Indian Navy, the Indian Territorial Army, reserve personnel, and any other legally constituted armed force. Nursing members of the armed forces are also eligible for the award. Police personnel including the Central Armed Police Forces, and the Railway Protection Force are also eligible for the award. The award can also be given to any civilian at the discretion of the Government of India. It is awarded for the "most conspicuous bravery or some daring or pre-eminent valour or self-sacrifice" during times other than war.

== Design ==
The medal is circular with a diameter of 1.375 in (34.9 mm). It has prominent rims and is made of gold gilding. On the front side, it has a replica of the Ashok Chakra surrounded by a wreath of sacred lotus. In the reverse, the words "Ashok Chakra" are embossed in Devanagri on the top and English towards the bottom edge. These are separated by a lotus flowers on either side. The medal is suspended by a straight bar suspender from a green ribbon with a central saffron stripe. If a recipient receives subsequent such awards, more bars are added to the ribbon by which the medal is suspended.

== Recipients ==
As of 2026, the medal has been awarded to 98 awardees, of which 68 were to posthumous recipients. Havildar Bachittar Singh of the Indian Army was the first recipient of the award for his part in the Operation Polo in 1948. Flight lieutenant Suhas Biswas was the first member of the Indian Air Force to be commemorated with the award in 1953. Flight captain D. K. Jatar, who was the pilot of the bombed Air India flight 300, was the first civilian recipient of the award in 1955. Only two women have ever been awarded the Ashok Chakra, flight attendant Neerja Bhanot in 1987 and police constable Kamlesh Kumari Yadav in 2001 for their actions during the hijack of Pan Am Flight 73 and 2001 Indian Parliament attack respectively.

Two non-Indians, cosmonauts Gennady Strekalov and Yuri Malyshev were given the award in 1984 for their Soyuz T-11 mission which also carried Rakesh Sharma, the first Indian to space. Paratrooper Sanjog Chhetri was the youngest awardee at 20 years of age, when he was killed in the counter terrorism operations in Jammu and Kashmir. Colonel Neelakantan Jayachandran Nair was the only recipient of both the Ashok Chakra and Kirti Chakra, the two highest peacetime honours.

| † | Indicates posthumous honour |
| ^ | Indicates non-Indian recipient |

Ashok Chakra recipients
| Year | Recipient | Rank | Service Branch | Action (Note: Refers to the conflict or event for which the Ashoka Chakra was awarded.) |
|---|---|---|---|---|
| 1952 | Bachittar Singh† | Havildar | Indian Army | Operation Polo |
| 1952 | Narbahadur Thapa | Naik | Indian Army | Operation Polo |
| 1953 | Suhas Biswas | Flight Lieutenant | Indian Air Force | Stricken flight landing |
| 1955 | D. K. Jatar† | Flight Captain | Air India | Kashmir Princess bombing |
| 1956 | Sundar Singh | Lance Naik | Indian Army | Kashmir conflict |
| 1957 | Jagannath Raoji Chitnis† | Lieutenant Colonel | Indian Army | Nagaland insurgency |
| 1957 | Joginder Singh† | Havildar | Indian Army | Nagaland insurgency |
| 1957 | Pollur Mutthuswamy Raman† | Second Lieutenant | Indian Army | Nagaland insurgency |
| 1958 | Eric James Tucker† | Captain | Indian Army | Nagaland insurgency |
| 1962 | Khadka Bahadur Limbu† | Subedar Major | Indian Army | Nagaland insurgency |
| 1962 | Man Bahadur Rai | Captain | Indian Army | Nagaland insurgency |
| 1965 | Chaman Lal† | | Firefighter | Train fire |
| 1965 | Lajja Ram† | | Civilian | Dacoit attack |
| 1965 | Purshottam† | | Civilian | Dacoit attack |
| 1965 | Tej Singh† | | Civilian | Dacoit attack |
| 1967 | Shankar Lal Shrivastava† | Head Constable | Madhya Pradesh Police | Dacoit attack |
| 1968 | Takhat Singh† | | Civilian | Dacoit attack |
| 1968 | Dhanpat Singh | | Civilian | Dacoit attack |
| 1968 | Govind Singh | | Civilian | Dacoit attack |
| 1968 | Hukum Singh | | Civilian | Dacoit attack |
| 1968 | Lakhan Singh | | Civilian | Dacoit attack |
| 1969 | Jas Ram Singh | Captain | Indian Army | Mizo insurgency |
| 1971 | Baij Nath Singh† | | Civilian | Dacoit attack |
| 1972 | Bhure Lal | Constable | Madhya Pradesh Police | Dacoit attack |
| 1972 | Ummed Singh Mahra† | Captain | Indian Army | Nagaland insurgency |
| 1974 | Gurnam Singh† | Naib Subedar | Indian Army | Mine explosion |
| 1974 | Munni Lal | | Civilian | Dacoit attack |
| 1981 | Cyrus Addie Pithawalla | Second Lieutenant | Indian Army | Manipur insurgency |
| 1984 | Gennady Strekalov^ | Flight Engineer | Roscosmos | Soyuz T-11 |
| 1984 | Yuri Malyshev^ | Colonel | Soviet Air Forces | Soyuz T-11 |
| 1985 | Bhawani Datt Joshi† | Naik | Indian Army | Operation Blue Star |
| 1985 | Bhukant Mishra† | Major | Indian Army | Operation Blue Star |
| 1985 | Chhering Mutup | Lance Havildar | Indian Army | Siachen conflict |
| 1985 | Jasbir Singh Raina | Captain | Indian Army | Operation Blue Star |
| 1985 | Nirbhay Singh Sisodiya† | Naik | Indian Army | Operation Blue Star |
| 1985 | Ram Prakash Roperia† | Lieutenant | Indian Army | Operation Blue Star |
| 1985 | Rakesh Sharma | Wing Commander | Indian Air Force | Soyuz T-11 |
| 1986 | Vijay Jagirdar† | | Civilian | 1984 anti-Sikh riots |
| 1987 | Neerja Bhanot† | | Civilian | Pan Am Flight 73 hijack |
| 1991 | Randhir Prasad Verma† | Superintendent of Police | Bihar Police | Bank robbery |
| 1992 | Sandeep Sankhla† | Major | Indian Army | Kashmir insurgency |
| 1993 | Rakesh Singh Malhan† | Second Lieutenant | Indian Army | Kashmir insurgency |
| 1994 | Neelakantan Jayachandran Nair† | Colonel | Indian Army | Kashmir insurgency |
| 1995 | Harsh Uday Singh Gaur† | Lieutenant Colonel | Indian Army | Kashmir insurgency |
| 1995 | Rajiv Kumar Joon† | Major | Indian Army | Kashmir insurgency |
| 1995 | Sujjan Singh Yadav† | Subedar | Indian Army | Kashmir insurgency |
| 1996 | Arun Singh Jasrotia† | Captain | Indian Army | Kashmir insurgency |
| 1997 | Puneet Nath Datt† | Second Lieutenant | Indian Army | Kashmir insurgency |
| 1997 | Shanti Swaroop Rana† | Lieutenant Colonel | Indian Army | Kashmir insurgency |
| 2000 | Sudhir Kumar Walia† | Major | Indian Army | Kashmir insurgency |
| 2001 | Jagdish Prasad Yadav† | | Rajya Sabha secretariat | 2001 Indian Parliament attack |
| 2001 | Matbar Singh Negi† | | Rajya Sabha secretariat | 2001 Indian Parliament attack |
| 2001 | Kamlesh Kumari Yadav† | Constable | Central Reserve Police Force | 2001 Indian Parliament attack |
| 2002 | Surinder Singh† | Subedar | Indian Army | Kashmir insurgency |
| 2002 | Rambeer Singh Tomar† | Naik | Indian Army | Kashmir insurgency |
| 2003 | Suresh Chand Yadav† | Subedar Major | National Security Guard | Akshardham Temple attack |
| 2004 | Sanjog Chhetri† | Paratrooper | Indian Army | Kashmir insurgency |
| 2004 | Triveni Singh† | Lieutenant | Indian Army | Kashmir insurgency |
| 2007 | Chuni Lal† | Naib Subedar | Indian Army | Kashmir insurgency |
| 2007 | Harshan R Nair† | Captain | Indian Army | Kashmir insurgency |
| 2007 | Vasanth Venugopal† | Colonel | Indian Army | Kashmir insurgency |
| 2008 | Dinesh Raghu Raman† | Major | Indian Army | Kashmir insurgency |
| 2009 | Ashok Kamte† | Additional Commissioner | Maharashtra Police | 2008 Mumbai attacks |
| 2009 | Bahadur Singh Bohra† | Havildar | Indian Army | Kashmir insurgency |
| 2009 | Gajender Singh Bisht† | Havildar | National Security Guard | 2008 Mumbai attacks |
| 2009 | Hemant Karkare† | Joint Commissioner | Maharashtra Police | 2008 Mumbai attacks |
| 2009 | Jojan Thomas† | Colonel | Indian Army | Kashmir insurgency |
| 2009 | Mohan Chand Sharma† | Inspector | Delhi Police | Batla House encounter |
| 2009 | Pramod Kumar Satapathy† | Assistant Commandant of Police | Odisha Police | Naxalite–Maoist insurgency |
| 2009 | R. P. Diengdoh† | Deputy Superintendent | Meghalaya Police | Meghalaya Insurgency |
| 2009 | Sandeep Unnikrishnan† | Major | National Security Guard | 2008 Mumbai attacks |
| 2009 | Tukaram Omble† | Assistant Sub-Inspector | Maharashtra Police | 2008 Mumbai attacks |
| 2009 | Vijay Salaskar† | Inspector | Maharashtra Police | 2008 Mumbai attacks |
| 2010 | D. Sreeram Kumar | Major | Indian Army | Manipur insurgency |
| 2010 | Mohit Sharma† | Major | Indian Army | Kashmir insurgency |
| 2010 | Rajesh Kumar† | Havildar | Indian Army | Kashmir insurgency |
| 2011 | Laishram Jyotin Singh† | Major | Indian Army | February 2010 Kabul attack |
| 2012 | Navdeep Singh† | Lieutenant | Indian Army | Kashmir insurgency |
| 2014 | Mukund Varadarajan† | Major | Indian Army | Kashmir insurgency |
| 2014 | Neeraj Kumar Singh† | Naik | Indian Army | Kashmir insurgency |
| 2014 | K. Prasad Babu† | Sub-Inspector | Andhra Pradesh Police | Naxalite–Maoist insurgency |
| 2016 | Mohan Nath Goswami† | Lance Naik | Indian Army | Kashmir insurgency |
| 2017 | Hangpan Dada† | Havildar | Indian Army | Kashmir insurgency |
| 2018 | Jyoti Prakash Nirala† | Corporal | Indian Air Force | Kashmir insurgency |
| 2019 | Nazir Ahmad Wani† | Lance Naik | Territorial Army | Kashmir insurgency |
| 2021 | Babu Ram† | Assistant Sub-Inspector | Jammu and Kashmir Police | Kashmir insurgency |
| 2026 | Shubhanshu Shukla | Group Captain | Indian Air Force | Axiom Mission 4 |

=== Summary ===
Award recipients by year
| Year | Number of recipients |
|---|---|
| 1952–1959 | 09 |
| 1960–1969 | 13 |
| 1970–1979 | 05 |
| 1980–1989 | 12 |
| 1990–1999 | 10 |
| 2000–2009 | 24 |
| 2010–2019 | 12 |
| 2020–2029 | 02 |

Award recipients by service
| Field | Number of recipients |
|---|---|
| Indian Army | 52 |
| Indian Air Force | 04 |
| Civilians | 17 |
| Police | 12 |
| Non-Indians | 02 |

== Allowances and benefits ==
Ashok Chakra awardees are entitled to a monthly allowance ₹12,000 (US$130). Additionally the recipients receive one-time cash awards or land from their respective state governments, but the benefits vary widely across states. Telangana and Punjab provide ₹22.5 million (US$240,000) and ₹20 million (US$210,000) respectively. Other states such as Andhra Pradesh, Bihar, Gujarat, Himachal Pradesh, Kerala, Mizoram, and Tamil Nadu provide benefits ranging from ₹20,000 (US$210) to ₹5 million (US$53,000).

Ashok Chakra awardees are also entitled to other benefits, including exemption from income tax on their pension, complimentary first-class travel on Indian Railways, and exemption from toll charges on national highways. They are also eligible for a 50% discount on the base fare for domestic flights operated by Indian carriers, as well as complimentary upgrades to business class on Air India, subject to availability.

== See also ==
- List of highest military decorations by country
