= Eric James Tucker =

Ashoka Chakra recipient

Captain Eric James Tucker AC
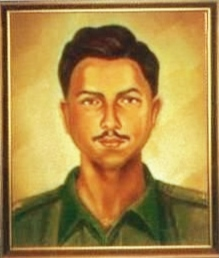
- Portrait of Capt Eric James Tucker
- Born: 21 October 1927; Cuttuck, Bihar and Orissa Province, British India (now in Odisha, India)
- Died: 2 August 1957 (aged 29); Assam, India (now Nagaland)
- Military career
- Allegiance: British India; India
- Branch: British Indian Army; Indian Army
- Service years: 1947–1957
- Rank: Captain
- Service number: SS-14191; IC-5034 (regular commission)
- Unit: 2 Maratha LI
- Awards: Ashoka Chakra

Captain Eric James Tucker, AC, ADC(21 October 1927 - 2 August 1957) was an Indian Army officer who was Posthumously awarded the highest peace time gallantry award, Ashok Chakra for an act of Gallantry in Nagaland.

== Early life ==
Capt Eric James Tucker was born on 21 October 1927. He attended Stewart School, Cuttack. His father's name was Mr. Veera Vijaya Suckev.

== Military career ==
Tucker was commissioned on a short-service commission in the Maratha Light Infantry on 13 July 1947. On 9 December 1949, he was appointed aide-de-camp to the GOC-in-C, Eastern Command, with the local rank of captain. On 1 August 1950, he received a regular commission as a lieutenant (seniority from 13 April 1950 and with seniority as second lieutenant from 13 April 1948). He was promoted captain on 13 April 1954.

== The Naga insurgency ==
The Naga Insurgency was India's first and oldest rebellion since independence. The guerrilla gangs were ferocious and battle-trained. In 1956, Captain Eric James Tucker commanded 'B' Company of the 2nd Battalion of the Maratha Light Infantry, which was operating in the Naga Hills. He was tasked with opening the lines of communication from Chakabama to Phek, a distance of 42 miles, and further to Meluri, an additional 20 miles away. He successfully achieved his objective and reached Meluri on 15 October 1956 following a successful encounter with a large number of hostile guerrillas armed with automatics and rifles. Undeterred by his injuries, he continued to fight with great courage, inflicting many casualties on the enemy. Subsequently, Captain Tucker undertook many dangerous and arduous tasks far beyond his duty, remaining relentless despite repeated warnings from the rebels that they would kill him. On 1 April 1957, while operating in the Naga Hills, he received information about a rebel concentration at Chipokatami. He immediately rushed to the location, moving through the dark jungles, and took the rebels by surprise, capturing four of them along with their weapons. On 18 July 1957, he executed a major maneuver, inflicting heavy casualties and capturing a number of prisoners. On 2 August 1957, while leading a platoon from Khuzami to Kiviku, he was ambushed in the thick undergrowth of the jungle by militants who had obtained advance information about his movement. Captain Eric James Tucker was hit by the militants in the face and legs but stood his ground, fighting and engaging the militants until the last round. In a final act of bravery, he charged at the militants just before being killed by an automatic burst of fire.

== Ashoka Chakra awardee ==
Captain Eric James led his men with determination amidst hostile concentration. He was a figure to looked upon by his comrades for his sense of leadership. In his career span he was awarded Ashoka Chakra.
