= Man Bahadur Rai =

Recipient of the Ashoka Chakra (1914–2011)

Captain Man Bahadur Rai AC, MC, IDSM
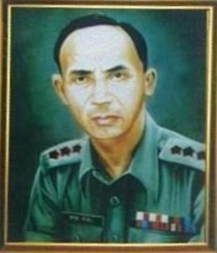
- Portrait of Captain Man Bahadur Rai
- Born: 10 January 1914; Darjeeling district, Bengal Presidency, British Raj (present-day West Bengal, India)
- Died: 14 February 2011 (aged 97); Jorhat, Assam, India
- Military career
- Allegiance: British India; India
- Branch: British Indian Army; Indian Army
- Service years: 1930–19??
- Rank: Captain
- Service number: 17249IO (British Indian Army Indian Officer); SS-14842 (short-service commission); IC-5261 (regular commission)
- Units: 10th Princess Mary's Own Gurkha Rifles; 11th Gorkha Rifles; Assam Rifles
- Conflicts: World War II; Burma campaign; Insurgency in Northeast India
- Awards: Ashoka Chakra; Military Cross; Indian Distinguished Service Medal

Captain Man Bahadur Rai AC, MC, IDSM (10 January 1914 – 14 February 2011) was a highly decorated Indian Army Gorkha officer and a recipient of the Ashoka Chakra, the highest peacetime Indian gallantry decoration. Only the fourth Ashoka Chakra recipient to be decorated while living, he was the third Indian Army serviceman and the first Indian Army officer to have been honoured while alive.

== Early life ==
A member of a Rai family in the Darjeeling district, Rai enlisted in the British Indian Army on 17 July 1930, joining the 1st Battalion of 10th Gurkha Rifles.

== Second World War ==
During the Second World War, Rai was promoted to jemadar (now naib subedar) on 1 December 1941. As an acting subedar (paid), he fought in the Burma Campaign, during which he won the Indian Distinguished Service Medal (IDSM). The citation (which was not made public), reads as follows:

10 December 1943

Subedar Manbahadur Rai, 1/10 Gurkha Rifles, 63rd Indian Infantry Brigade, 17th Indian Division

On the 14th November 1943 this G.O. [Gurkha Officer] was 2nd in command of a company which was ordered to counter-attack at night against strong Japanese forces, estimated to be the major part of a battalion and supported by mortars and infantry guns. During the course of the fighting, which lasted the whole of the next day, and during which quite early in the proceedings his company commander was wounded five times, this Officer displayed the greatest coolness, courage and military skill. Initially in charge of the mortars and rear [illegible] company H.Q., he kept his Brigade H.Q. fully and continuously in the picture, gauging accurately when extra ammunition was required and organising the evacuation of the wounded. When his company commander was wounded, he ordered him back to Rear H. Q. and took over command. For some hours he kept large numbers of the enemy at bay by his oppositions, ensuring he could not be surrounded, counter-attacking twice, methodically collecting a large quantity of material for identification purposes and finally when ordered to withdraw, pulling out unhurried and with great military precision. All his dead, wounded and material were got away including much enemy material, and the enemy received such a hard blow that he never followed up and indeed has never recovered the position. Throughout, this Officer’s leadership and military skill was of the highest order.

Subsequently promoted to war-substantive subedar, Rai was awarded the Military Cross (MC) on 8 October 1944. He received the decoration for, among other actions, his command of his company during the Battle of Imphal in the area of Bishnupur, Manipur. Taking command after his company commander had been killed and while he and his unit were pinned down by Japanese machine-gun fire from several bunkers, Rai conducted a reconnaissance mission and located all of the nearby enemy bunkers. After throwing five grenades at the nearest bunkers, he devised a plan of attack and led his company in an attack which eliminated the first line of bunkers. In the full citation, which was not published, Rai was commended for:

...his dash and courage, combined with high qualities of leadership and initiative shown by this Gurkha Officer on all occasions when his company has been in action.

== Indian Army service ==
After Indian independence, Rai's regiment, the 10th Gurkha Rifles, which primarily recruited soldiers of the Rai ethnicity, was allocated to the United Kingdom and became a British Army regiment. Rai opted to serve in the Indian Army, joining the newly re-raised 11th Gorkha Rifles. On 23 August 1948, he received a short-service commission as a second lieutenant in the 11th Gorkhas (seniority from 23 August 1946). He received a regular commission as a lieutenant on 7 February 1951 (seniority from 27 August 1948), and was promoted to captain on 27 August 1954. On 20 November 1956, he was seconded for service with the 8th Battalion of the Assam Rifles, and was then assigned to the Village Guards (Naga Hills, Tuensang Area) on 1 December 1957. He was appointed Officer Commanding Village Guard (Tuensang Wing) on 1 March 1958.

On 3 May 1961, Rai was decorated with the Ashoka Chakra for his heroism while in command of a platoon during the Nagaland Insurgency:

No. 9-Pres/62.—The President is pleased to approve the award of the ASHOKA CHAKRA, CLASS I, to the undermentioned personnel for most conspicuous bravery:

Captain MAN BAHADUR RAI (IC-5261). M.C., I.D.S.M., 11th Gorkha Rifles.(Seconded to Assam Rifles).

(Effective date of award — 3rd May 1961)

In April–May 1961, Captain Man Bahadur Rai (IC-5261) took part in a series of actions against a body of hostile Nagas who had entrenched themselves in a very difficult, densely wooded, hilly region interspersed with numerous ravines. Towards the end of April 1961, he led a platoon at dead of night through two hostile positions into the heart of their stronghold, fiercely attacked them and was successful in dislodging them from that position. On the 3rd May 1961, he led a platoon against another strongly fortified hostile position which was situated on the steep slopes of a ravine. This position dominated the surrounding area and could not be approached except frontally. Captain Rai, knowing that heavy casualties would result if he were to attack frontally, took half a platoon, crawled through the thick undergrowth and scaled up the steep side while exposed to a hail of close range fire which covered his advance. On locating the hostile position, he pressed forward in its direction, threw two hand grenades killing a few hostiles and charged the position firing as he went and killing two more hostiles. This fearless and unexpected assault spurred his men to action and so demoralised the hostiles that they fled into the thick jungle. The hostiles lost ten men in the encounter and left behind two rifles, one 12 bore gun and one tommy gun. The attack dealt a crushing blow to the hostiles and led to the eventual destruction of their position. This action was one of several in which Captain Rai took part, first as an officer of the 8th Battalion of the Assam Rifles and more recently as an officer of the Village Guards Organisation of Nagaland. Throughout this period, he repeatedly showed conspicuous bravery, unselfishness and indomitable courage in very difficult and dangerous situations. His leader-ship and unconquerable will have been a source of inspiration to all his comrades and are in the highest traditions of the Army.

== Later life and death ==
After retiring from the Indian Army, Rai settled at Jorhat in Assam. He died there on 14 February 2011, aged 97, and was accorded full military honours by the Assam Rifles at his funeral. The Assam Rifles named an auditorium at their Shillong HQ in honour of Rai.

== Awards ==

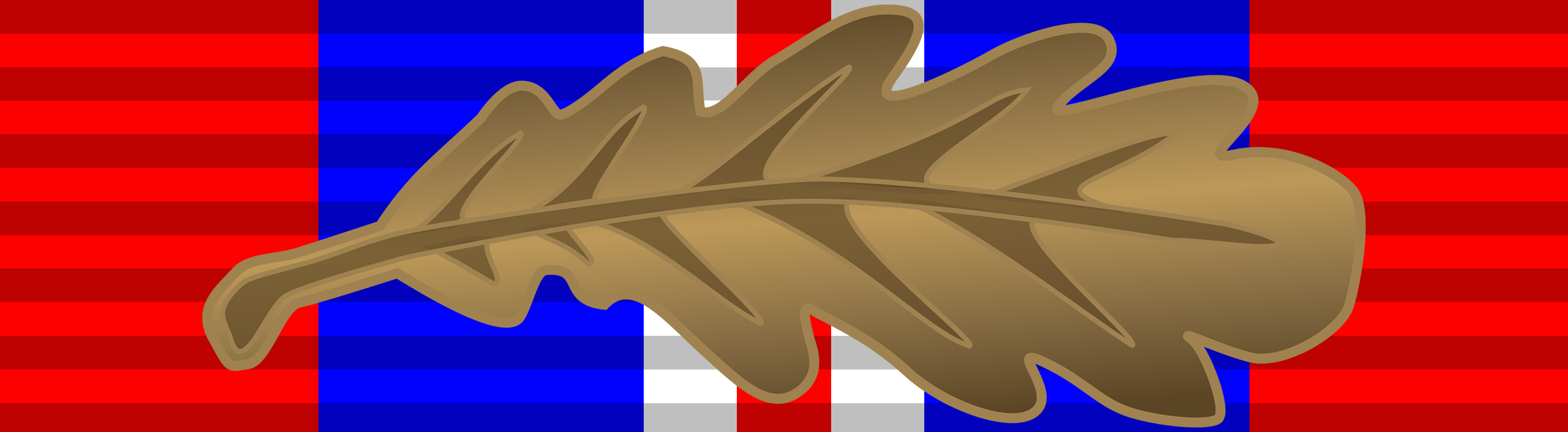

	Ashoka Chakra	General Service Medal 1947	
Samanya Seva Medal	Samar Seva Star	Raksha Medal	Indian Independence Medal
20 Years Long Service Medal	9 Years Long Service Medal	Military Cross	Indian Distinguished Service Medal
1939-45 Star	Burma Star	War Medal 1939-1945	India Service Medal
