= Gurnam Singh (soldier) =

Ashoka Chakra recipient (1935–1973)

Naib Subedar Gurnam Singh AC
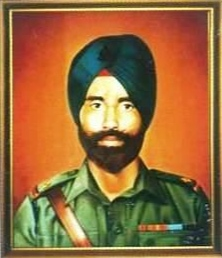
- Portrait of Naib Subedar Gurnam Singh
- Born: 18 August 1935; Bhullar, Amritsar, Punjab, British India
- Died: 23 September 1973 (aged 38)
- Military career
- Allegiance: India
- Branch: Indian Army
- Service years: 1955-1973
- Rank: Naib Subedar
- Service number: JC47692K
- Unit: 108 Engr Regt
- Awards: Ashoka Chakra

Naib Subedar Gurnam Singh, AC (18 August 1935 – 23 September 1973) was a Junior Commissioned officer (JCO) in Indian Army who was posthumously awarded the Ashoka Chakra, India's highest peacetime military decoration for his self sacrifice in a mine explosion.

== Early life ==
Singh was born on 18 August 1935 in Bhullar village in Amritsar district of Punjab. Son of Shri Tej Singh, Gurnam Singh belonged to the family of military personnel. He was influenced by his military family members and nursed the idea of serving in the Army since his childhood. After his basic education in his native place, he got selected to join the Army and was happy to achieve his childhood dream.

== Military career ==
On 26 August 1955, Gurnam Singh joined Bombay Sappers as a recruit and got appointed as a sapper after his initial training. After two years, on 19 July 1957, he got posted in the depot battalion (T). After serving the company for four and half years, he was posted to training battalion in Oct 1962. On 5 January 1971, he was then appointed as an instructor at "College of Military Engineering", Pune after serving with 22 and 23 Field Companies for few years.

== Mine explosion ==
A demonstration was arranged by the College of Military Engineering for the visiting staff and student officers of the Defence Services Staff College, Wellington On 23 September 1973. Gurnam Singh was tasked to the Charge of the demonstration of line Mine Clearing, an explosive device for the clearing of enemy mine fields. The task was assisted by party of seven sappers. Preparing the Charge Line Mine Clearing for firing, the tail initiator of the charge got prematurely actuated. He at once realized that the entire explosive was likely to blow up within ten seconds. When he realized the danger to the lives of the men under his command, he immediately ordered them to run to a safe distance but he disagreed of his personal safety. But unfortunately, he was not able to prevent the explosion within the few seconds, at his disposal. Gurnam Singh was blown to pieces.

== Ashoka Chakra awardee ==
For his supreme sacrifice for the men under his command and devotion to duty Gurnam Singh was given the nation's highest gallantry award during peace time Ashok Chakra.

== Personal life ==
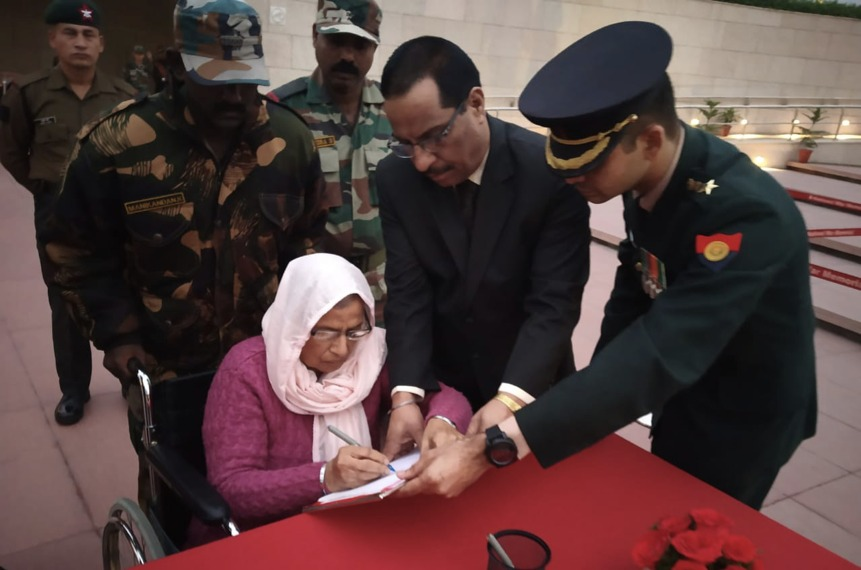
Srimati Jagir Kaur, Wife of Naib Subedar Gurnam Singh, AC laid wreath at the National War Memorial in his remembrance.

Naib Subedar Gurnam Singh was married to Srimati Jagir Kaur.
