= Ram Prakash Roperia =

Indian Army officer

Lieutenant Ram Prakash Roperia AC
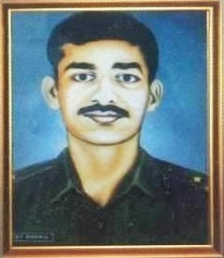
- Portrait of Lt Ram Prakash Roperia
- Born: 10 June 1959; Pali Village, Hisar district, India
- Died: 9 June 1984 (aged 24); Amritsar, Punjab, India
- Military career
- Allegiance: India
- Branch: Indian Army
- Service years: 1981-1984
- Rank: Lieutenant
- Service number: IC-39994H
- Unit: 26 Madras
- Conflicts: Operation Blue Star
- Awards: Ashoka Chakra

Lieutenant Ram Prakash Roperia, AC (10 June 1959 – 9 June 1984) was an Indian Army officer who was awarded India's highest peace time military decoration Ashoka Chakra for his gallant act in Operation Blue Star.

== Early life ==
Lieutenant Ram Prakash Roperia, son of Shri Bhal Singh, was born in Pali village in Hisar District of Haryana on 10 June 1959. His early education took place in his village school and later he went to Sainik School, Kunjpura in Haryana. He passed his Higher Secondary examination with First class in 1976. Ram Prakash was a boy of good nature and was liked by his teachers and colleagues equally. He excelled in academics and sports both. He completed his B.Sc. (Hons) in Agriculture from the Haryana Agricultural University with First distinction.

== Military career ==
After his graduation he joined Indian Military Academy and was commissioned a second lieutenant in the Indian Army on 19 December 1981 in the 26th Battalion of the Madras Regiment. He was promoted to lieutenant on 19 December 1983, with his promotion gazetted posthumously.

== Operation Blue Star ==
On the night of 5/6 June 1984, during Operation Blue Star, ‘C’ Company of 26 Madras was shouldered the task to secure the first floor of a building complex that was held by the notorious terrorists. The Building Complex was heavily fortified by the terrorists. Lieutenant Ram Prakash Roperia was the officiating officer commanding of ‘C’ Company of 26 Madras. Terrorists armed with automatic weapons had blocked the staircases leading to the first floor. Lt Ram Prakash Roperia studied the situation and came to a conclusion of climbing the building with the help of a ladder, without giving even a single thought about his personal safety. While attempting to climb to the first floor he was pinned with machine gun firing, however he continued dauntlessly with his attempts to reach the first floor and only post three attempts he asked for the support.

In the fourth attempt where he was accompanied by Naib Subedar KG Koshy, they made it to the first floor of the building. They were followed by the company that helped them achieve their allotted objectives and destroyed the terrorists stronghold. Deluged in machine gun firing Lt Ram Prakash Roperia and Naib Subedar KG Koshy cleared the bunkers. He led his company courageously even while clearing the stairs of the first floor a bullet pierced him. The bullet injury didn't bring any change in his motivation instead he upped his effort and lobbed two hand grenades and moved further on the stairs. He was again fired by a terrorist which injured him seriously but he also fired back and eliminated the terrorist who had shot him. He was seriously injured and hit by two bullets still he climbed down the stairs and established line with D company. However, as he reached the ground floor he collapsed and was evacuated to hospital where he succumbed to his injuries.

== Ashoka Chakra awardee ==
In 1985, Roperia was posthumously awarded Ashoka Chakra for his part in Operation Blue Star.
