= Kashmir Princess =

1955 airliner bombing

Coordinates: 12°N 113°E

Air India Flight 300
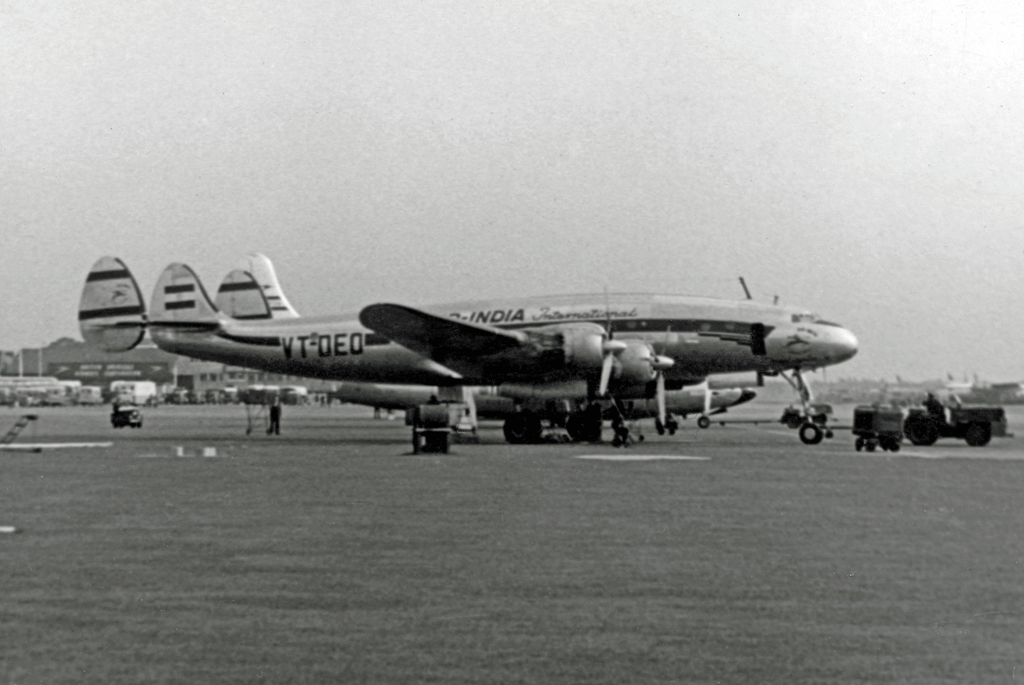
- A Lockheed L-749A Constellation similar to the incident aircraft, sister ship of the accident aircraft

Bombing
- Date: 11 April 1955
- Summary: Bombing
- Site: off the Natuna Islands, Indonesia

Aircraft
- Aircraft type: Lockheed L-749A Constellation
- Aircraft name: Kashmir Princess
- Operator: Air India
- IATA flight No.: AI300
- ICAO flight No.: AIC300
- Call sign: AIR INDIA 300
- Registration: VT-DEP
- Flight origin: Santa Cruz Airport, Bombay, India
- Stopover: Kai Tak Airport, Hong Kong
- Destination: Kemayoran Airport, Jakarta, Indonesia
- Passengers: 11
- Crew: 8
- Fatalities: 16
- Injuries: 3
- Survivors: 3

The Kashmir Princess, or Air India Flight 300, was a chartered Lockheed L-749A Constellation Air India flight. On 11 April 1955, it was severely damaged mid-air by a bomb explosion and crashed into the South China Sea while en route from Bombay, India to Jakarta, Indonesia via Hong Kong. Of the nineteen occupants, only three survived.

The explosion was an assassination attempt targeting Chinese Premier Zhou Enlai, who missed the flight either due to a medical emergency or because he had prior knowledge. Hong Kong authorities concluded that the Kuomintang were responsible for the bombing.

== Explosion and crash ==
Flight 300 departed Hong Kong at 04:25 GMT (13:25 local time) carrying Chinese and Eastern European delegates, mainly journalists, to the Afro-Asian Bandung Conference in Jakarta. Approximately five hours into the flight, the crew heard an explosion. Smoke quickly entered the cabin from a fire on the right wing directly behind the No. 3 (or right inboard) engine. Upon hearing the explosion and seeing the fire-warning light for the baggage compartment come on, the captain shut down the No. 3 engine and feathered its propeller, fearing it might catch fire. This left three engines running. The crew sent out three distress signals giving their position over the Natuna Islands before the radio went dead.

The captain tried to land the plane on the sea, but the depressurizing cabin, smoke seeping into the cockpit, and failing circuits made it impossible. Left with no other option, the crew issued life jackets and opened the emergency doors to ensure a quick escape as the plane plunged into the sea below.

The starboard wing struck water first, tearing the plane into three parts. The aircraft maintenance engineer, the navigator, and the first officer escaped. They were later found by the Indonesian Coast Guard. The remaining 16 passengers and crew members, however, drowned at sea.

== Targetting of Zhou Enlai ==
Investigators believed that the explosion had been caused by a time bomb placed aboard the aircraft by a Kuomintang secret agent who was attempting to assassinate Zhou Enlai. Zhou Enlai was an influential figure in Communist China, and the United States saw him as an obstacle in the Cold War. At the time, the West viewed the Bandung Conference as a gathering of communists and pro-communists that would boost the expansion of communism in Asia.

The Premier of the People's Republic of China had been scheduled to board the plane to attend the conference but had changed his travel plans at the last minute. Zhou Enlai had planned to fly from Beijing to Hong Kong and then on to Jakarta on the Kashmir Princess. An emergency appendectomy delayed his arrival in Hong Kong. He left China three days after the crash and flew to Rangoon to meet with Indian Prime Minister Jawaharlal Nehru and Burmese Prime Minister U Nu before continuing to Bandung to attend the conference.

Some historians have argued that Zhou may have known about the assassination plot beforehand and that the premier did not undergo an appendectomy at the time. Steve Tsang of Oxford University wrote in the September 1994 edition of The China Quarterly, "Evidence now suggests that Zhou knew of the plot beforehand and secretly changed his travel plans, though he did not stop a decoy delegation of lesser cadres from taking his place."

== Investigation ==
The day after the crash, China's Foreign Ministry issued a statement that described the bombing as "a murder by the special service organizations of the United States and Chiang Kai-shek", while Hong Kong Governor Sir Alexander Grantham maintained that the plane was not tampered with in Hong Kong.

The Hong Kong authorities offered HK$100,000 for information leading to the arrest of those responsible. They questioned 71 people connected with the servicing of the Air India flight. When police began focusing on Chow Tse-ming, a janitor for Hong Kong Aircraft Engineering Co., he stowed away on a CIA-owned Civil Air Transport aircraft to Taiwan. The Hong Kong police reported that a warrant charging a murder conspiracy was issued, but the man with the name Chow Tse-ming in the warrant had flown to Taiwan on 18 May 1955, and Chow Tse-ming had three aliases. Steve Tsang collected evidence from British, Taiwanese, American, and Hong Kong archives that points directly to KMT agents operating in Hong Kong as the perpetrators of the aircraft bombing. According to him, the KMT had a special operations group stationed in Hong Kong responsible for assassination and sabotage. In March 1955, the group recruited Chow for the assassination because his job at the airport gave him easy access to the Air India plane, and offered him HK$600,000 and refuge in Taiwan if necessary. A Chinese Foreign Ministry document declassified in 2004 also indicates that the KMT secret service was responsible for the bombing.

In addition to the KMT, there were rumours of CIA involvement in this incident as well. Aside from the fact that Chow escaped to Taiwan aboard a CIA-owned aircraft, there was no evidence that the CIA was involved until a decade later, when several Americans claimed they were involved. China had from the outset accused the United States of involvement in the bombing, but while the CIA had considered a plan to assassinate Zhou Enlai at this time, the Church Committee – a US Senate select committee that investigated the US intelligence community – reported that these plans were disapproved of and "strongly censured" by Washington. In a 1971 face-to-face meeting in the Great Hall of the People in Beijing, Zhou directly asked Henry Kissinger about US involvement in the bombing. Kissinger responded, "As I told the Prime Minister the last time, he vastly overestimates the competence of the CIA."

In 1966, a U.S. Senate committee investigating CIA operations heard testimony that gave murky details of a CIA plot to assassinate an "East Asian leader" attending a 1955 Asian conference. That leader's identity would remain unknown until 1977, when William R. Corson, a retired U.S. Marine Corps intelligence officer who served in Asia, published Armies of Ignorance identifying that leader as Zhou Enlai.

On 24 October 1967, CIA agent John Discoe Smith defected to the Soviet Union. There, Smith recounted many of his operations in his memoirs, titled I Was an Agent of the CIA, including his delivery of a mysterious bag to a KMT agent. He said that in 1955, Jack Curran, a CIA officer attached to the U.S. Embassy in New Delhi, asked him to deliver a bag to Wang Feng at the Maidens Hotel in the Indian capital. Smith claimed that the bag contained the bomb used to sabotage Kashmir Princess.

== Commemorations ==
Captain D.K. Jatar was awarded the Ashok Chakra, India's highest honour for bravery. Stewardess Gloria Eva Berry was awarded the Kirti Chakra posthumously. First officer M.C. Dixit, ground maintenance engineer Anant Karnik, and navigator J.C. Pathak were awarded the Shaurya Chakra.

In 2005, the Xinhua News Agency hosted a symposium to commemorate the 50th anniversary of the crash; three Xinhua journalists had been among the victims.

== See also ==
- Timeline of airliner bombing attacks
