= Sanjog Chhetri =

Indian Army Ashoka Chakra recipient (1982–2002)

Paratrooper Sanjog Chhetri AC
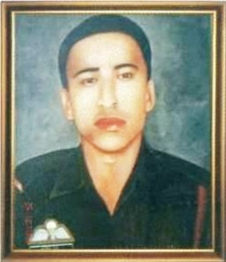
- Portrait of Ptr Sanjog Chhetri
- Born: 26 June 1982; Boomtar, Sikkim, India
- Died: 22 April 2003 (aged 20); Hill Kaka, Jammu and Kashmir, India
- Military career
- Allegiance: India
- Branch: Indian Army
- Service years: 2001-2003
- Rank: Paratrooper (Equivalent to the infantry rank of Sepoy or Private)
- Service number: 9423984
- Units: 9 Para (Special Forces); 5/11 Gorkha Rifles
- Conflicts: Insurgency in Jammu and Kashmir; Operation Sarp Vinash †
- Awards: Ashoka Chakra

Paratrooper Sanjog Chhetri, AC (26 June 1982 – 22 April 2003) was an Indian soldier and a recipient of the Ashoka Chakra, India's highest peace time military decoration. He was posthumously awarded the Ashoka Chakra for his actions during an Indian Army counterterrorism operation while serving with the 9 Para (Special Forces). He is the youngest recipient of the Ashoka Chakra.

== Early life ==
Chhetri was born on 26 June 1982 at Boomtar in Sikkim, to a Chhetri family. Chhetri and his sister were brought up by their uncle following the premature death of their father.

== Military career ==
Chhetri enlisted for the Indian Army and entered the military service with the 5/11 Gorkha Rifles on 31 March 2001 at the age of 18. He later attempted the selection process and training course of the Para (Special Forces) and was posted with its ninth battalion after clearing both.

He was subsequently stationed in Jammu and Kashmir, an area where the special forces frequently participated in counterinsurgency operations during the 2000s Insurgency in Jammu and Kashmir.

On 22 April 2003, Indian security forces received intelligence about the presence of high-profile militants at an insurgent hideout near the Hill Kaka region. After a careful analysis of intelligence inputs, the army decided to launch an operation code named 'Operation Sarp Vinash' to flush out the militant commanders. An assault team of 20 operators which included Chhetri was sent to conduct the operation.

The team successfully cordoned off the area quickly after arriving at the hideout but drew heavy fire upon trying to move forward. A fierce gunbattle then ensued, in which the thirteen militants, who were well armed with automatic firearms fired at the operators from secure positions.

After observing that his team had been caught in a rather dangerous position against the militants, Chettri crawled a distance of almost 100 yards and killed a militant from close range. He then exchanged fire with the other militants and was soon wounded but refused to retreat from his position, gunning down another militant despite having been shot at multiple times. He then drew his combat knife and killed another insurgent in hand to hand combat before succumbing to his injuries. The assault team was later able to successfully kill all the remaining militants.

== Legacy ==
Chhetri was posthumously awarded the Ashoka Chakra, India's highest peace time military decoration by the Government of India during the 2003 Indian Independence Day celebrations.

== See also ==
- Para (Special Forces)
- Mohit Sharma (soldier)
