= Sikanderpur, Kannauj =

Sikanderpur, Kannauj Sikanderpur
- town
- Location in Uttar Pradesh, India Sikanderpur, Kannauj (India)
- Coordinates: 27.13°N 79.60°E
- Country: India
- State: Uttar Pradesh
- District: Kannauj

Population (2001)
  - Total: 7,564

Languages
  - Official: Hindi
- Time zone: UTC+5:30 (IST)
- Vehicle registration: UP
- Website: up.gov.in

Sikanderpur is a town and a nagar panchayat in Kannauj district in the Indian state of Uttar Pradesh.

== Geography ==
Sikanderpur is located at 27.13°N 79.60°E.

== Demographics ==
As of 2001, India census, Sikanderpur had a population of 7,564 Now it's 17586 . Males constitute 52% of the population and females 48%. Sikanderpur has an average literacy rate of 87%, higher than the national average of 59.5%: male literacy is 89%, and female literacy is 85%. In Sikanderpur, 16% of the population is under 6 years of age.
