= Meghalaya Police =

- Emblem of the Meghalaya Police
- Abbreviation: MLP

Jurisdictional structure
- Operations jurisdiction: Meghalaya, IN
- Map of Meghalaya Police Department's jurisdiction
- Legal jurisdiction: As per operations jurisdiction
- General nature: Local civilian police

Operational structure
- Headquarters: Shillong, Meghalaya
- Agency executive: Lajja Ram Bishnoi, IPS, Director General of Police, Meghalaya Police

Website
- megpolice.gov.in

The Meghalaya Police is the law enforcement agency for the state of Meghalaya in India. It was part of the Assam Police until 1972 when the separate State of Meghalaya was created.

== Organizational structure ==
The Meghalaya Police is headed by the Director General of Police (DGP) presently Shri Lajja Ram Bishnoi, IPS (RR:1991)

The Total Sanctioned Strength of Meghalaya Police is 12,911 personnel, with an actual strength of 10,956. All serve in various positions. The headquarters of the Meghalaya Police is located on the Secretariat Hill, Shillong.
