= Lance naik =

Rank in Indian and Pakistan army

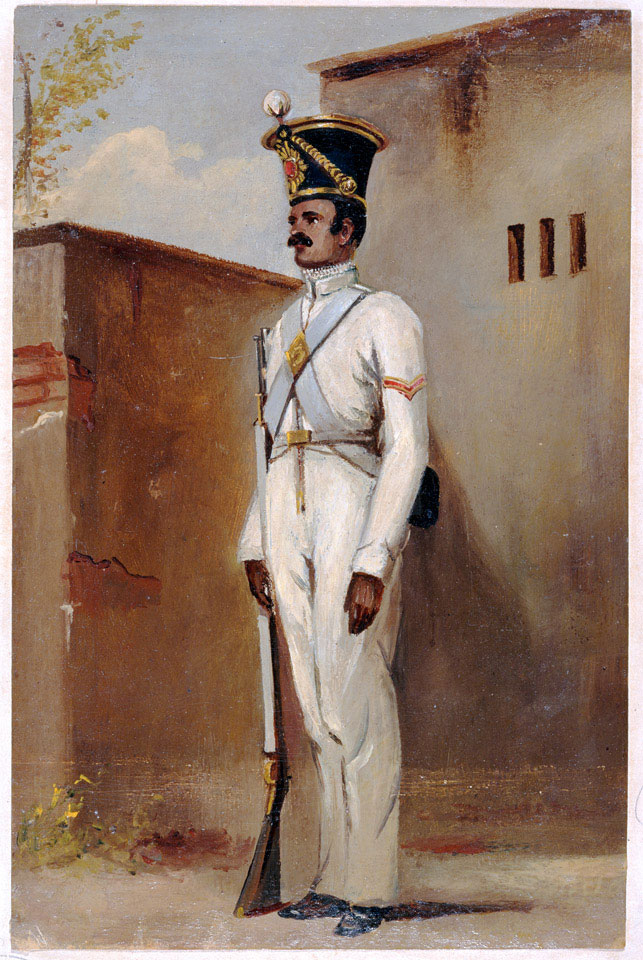
1842 painting of a Bengal Army lance naik

Insignia of an Indian Army Lance Naik

Insignia of a Pakistan Army Lance Naik

Lance naik (L/Nk) is the equivalent rank to lance corporal in the Indian and Pakistani armies and, before 1947, in the British Indian Army, ranking below naik and above sepoy. In cavalry units the equivalent is acting lance daffadar. Like British lance corporals, each wears a single rank chevron. A Lance Naik is responsible for providing assistance in the leadership of small teams or units.
