= Naik (military rank) =

Rank in Bangladesh, India, Pakistan

- Indian and Pakistani rank insignia
- Country: India; Pakistan
- Service branch: Army
- Abbreviation: Nk
- Rank group: Enlisted rank
- Next higher rank: Havildar
- Next lower rank: Lance naik
- Equivalent ranks: Lance Daffadar; Corporal

Naik (Nk; Hindustani: नायक (Devanagri); نائیک (Nastaliq)), also historically spelled as nayak, is an Indian Army and Pakistan Army rank equivalent to corporal. The rank was previously used in the British Indian Army and the Camel Corps, ranking between lance naik and havildar. In cavalry units, the equivalent is lance daffadar. Like a British corporal, a naik wears two rank chevrons. A naik leads a team of 8-10 soldiers.

== See also ==
- Army ranks and insignia of India
- Army ranks and insignia of Pakistan
