= List of Kirti Chakra award recipients =

Kirti Chakra awardees

Kirti Chakra
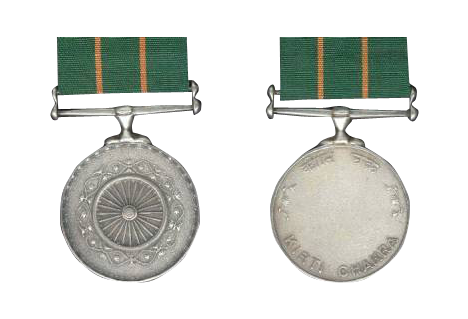
- Kirti Chakra and its ribbon, the second highest peacetime decoration of India
- Type: Medal
- Awarded for: Awarded for conspicuous gallantry otherwise than in the face of the enemy.
- Country: Republic of India
- Presented by: Republic of India
- Eligibility: Officers, men and women of all ranks of the Army, the Navy and the Air Force, of any of the Reserve Forces, of the Territorial Army, Militia and of any other lawfully constituted forces.; Members of the Nursing Services of the Armed Forces.; Civilian Citizens of either sex in all walks of life and members of Police Forces including Central Para-Military Forces and Railway protection Force.
- Post-nominals: KC
- Status: Currently Awarded
- Established: 1952; 74 years ago
- First award: 1952
- Final award: 2025

Highlights
- Total awarded posthumously: 199
- Total recipients: 498 (As of 2021)

Precedence
- Next (higher): Param Vishisht Seva Medal

- Equivalent: Maha Vir Chakra

- Next (lower): Padma Shri

The Kirti Chakra is an Indian military decoration awarded for valour, courageous action or self-sacrifice away from the field of battle. It may be awarded to civilians as well as military personnel, including posthumous awards. It is the peacetime equivalent of the Maha Vir Chakra. It is second in order of precedence of peacetime gallantry awards; it comes after Ashoka Chakra and before Shaurya Chakra. Before 1967, the award was known as the Ashoka Chakra, Class II.

== 2020–2029 ==
Year	Rank	Name	Service/Regiment	Notes
2026	Group Captain	Prashant Balakrishnan Nair	Indian Air Force	
2026	Naib Subedar	Doleshwar Subba	2 Para (SF)	
2026	Major	Arshdeep Singh	Armoured Regiment/ 1 Assam Rifles	
2025	Captain	L Sailo	4 Para (SF)	
2025	Lieutenant	Shashank Tiwari	Army Service Corps/ 1 Sikkim Scouts	Posthumous
2025	Lance Naik	Meenakshi Sundaram	Regiment of Artillery/ 34 RR	
2025	Sepoy	Janjal Pravin Prabhakar	Mahar Regiment/ 1 Rashtriya Rifles	Posthumous
2025	Major	Manjit	The Punjab Regiment / 22nd Battalion, The Rashtriya Rifles	
2025	Naik	Dilwar Khan	The Regiment of Artillery / 28th Battalion, The Rashtriya Rifles	Posthumous
2024	Colonel	Manpreet Singh, SM	The Sikh Light Infantry / 19th Battalion, The Rashtriya Rifles	Posthumous
2024	Major	Malla Rama Gopal Naidu	The Maratha Light Infantry / 56th Battalion, The Rashtriya Rifles	
2024	DSP	Himayun Muzzammil Bhat	Jammu and Kashmir Police	Posthumous
2024	Rifleman	Ravi Kumar	The Jammu and Kashmir Light Infantry / 63rd Battalion, The Rashtriya Rifles	Posthumous
2024	Major	Digvijay Singh Rawat	21st Battalion, The Parachute Regiment	
2024	Major	Deependra Vikram Basnet	4th Battalion, The Sikh Regiment	
2024	Captain	Anshuman Singh	Army Medical Corps / 26th Battalion, The Punjab Regiment	Posthumous
2024	Naib Subedar	Pawan Kumar Yadav	21st Battalion, The Mahar Regiment	
2024	Havildar	Abdul Majid	9th Battalion, The Parachute Regiment	Posthumous
2024	Sepoy	Pawan Kumar	The Grenadiers / 55Para^{th} Battalion, The Rashtriya Rifles	Posthumous
2023	Inspector	Dilip Kumar Das	Central Reserve Police Force	Posthumous
2023	Head Constable	Raj Kumar Yadava	Central Reserve Police Force	Posthumous
2023	Constable	Bablu Rabha	Central Reserve Police Force	Posthumous
2023	Constable	Sambhu Roy	Central Reserve Police Force	Posthumous
2023	Naik	Jitendra Singh	The Rajput Regiment / 44Para^{th} Battalion, The Rashtriya Rifles	
2023	Major	Shubhang	The Dogra Regiment / 62nd Battalion, The Rashtriya Rifles	
2023	Naik	Devendra Pratap Singh	The Armoured Corps / 55th Battalion, The Rashtriya Rifles	
2023	Constable	Rohit Kumar	Jammu and Kashmir Police	Posthumous
2023	Head Constable	Shrawan Kashyap	Chhattisgarh Police	Posthumous
2023	Head Constable	Sodhi Narayan	Chhattisgarh Police	Posthumous
2023	Sub Inspector	Deepak Bhardwaj	Chhattisgarh Police	Posthumous
2022	Sub Inspector	Paotinsat Guite	Border Security Force	Posthumous
2022	Constable	Sudip Sarkar	Border Security Force	Posthumous
2021	Constable	Altaf Hussain Bhat	Jammu and Kashmir Police	Posthumous
2021	Constable	Vinod Kumar	Central Reserve Police Force	Posthumous
2021	Head Constable	Shyam Narain Singh Yadava	Central Reserve Police Force	Posthumous
2021	Inspector	Pintu Kumar Singh	Central Reserve Police Force	Posthumous
2021	Deputy Commandant	Rahul Mathur	Central Reserve Police Force	
2021	Subedar	Sanjiv Kumar Thakur	4th Battalion, The Parachute Regiment	Posthumous
2020	Head Constable	Abdul Rashid Kalas	Jammu and Kashmir Police	Posthumous

== 2010–2019 ==
Year	Rank	Name	Service/Regiment	Notes
2019	Constable	Pradip Kumar Panda	Central Reserve Police Force	Posthumous
2019	Constable	Rajendra Kumar Nain	Central Reserve Police Force	Posthumous
2019	Deputy Commandant	Harshpal Singh	Central Reserve Police Force	
2019	Sapper	Prakash Jadhav	The Corps of Engineers / 1st Battalion, The Rashtriya Rifles	Posthumous
2019	Sawar	Vijay Kumar	The Armoured Corps / 22nd Battalion, The Rashtriya Rifles	Posthumous
2019	Major	Tushar Gauba	The Jat Regiment	
2018	Sepoy	Vrahma Pal Singh	The Rajput Regiment / 44th Battalion, The Rashtriya Rifles	Posthumous
2018	Major	Vijayant Bisht	The Jammu and Kashmir Light Infantry	
2017	Commandant	Cheatn Kumar Cheeta	Central Reserve Police Force	
2017	Commandant	Pramod Kumar	Central Reserve Police Force	Posthumous
2017	Lance Havildar	Prem Bahadur Resmi Magar	3rd Battalion, 1st Gorkha Rifles	Posthumous
2017	Havildar	Giris Gurung	4th Gorkha Riflles	Posthumous
2017	Major	Rohit Suri	4th Battalion, The Parachute Regiment	
2017	Major	David Manlun	The Naga Regiment	Posthumous
2017	Major	Preetam Singh Kunwar	The Garhwal Rifles	
2016	Head Constable	Rajesh Atra	Chhattisgarh Police	
2016	Constable	Gautam Koch	Assam Police	Posthumous
2016	Sepoy	Jagdish Chand	The Defence Security Corps	Posthumous
2016	Subedar	Mahendra Singh, SM	9th Battalion, The Parachute Regiment	
2015	Naib Subedar	Rajesh Kumar	The Mahar Regiment	Posthumous
2015	Lieutenant Colonel	Nectar Sanjenbam, SC	21st Battalion, The Parachute Regiment	
2015	Naib Subedar	Kosh Bahadur Gurung	1st Gorkha Rifles	
2015	Subedar	Ajay Vardhan	The Garhwal Rifles	Posthumous
2015	Captain	Jaidev Dangi	10th Battalion, The Parachute Regiment	
2014	Constable	Bhrigu Nandan Choudhary	Central Reserve Police Force	Posthumous
2014	Naib Subedar	Bhupal Singh Chhantel Magar	5th Gorkha Rifles	
2014	Wing Commander	Darryl Castelino	Indian Air Force	Posthumous
2013	Inspector	Lohit Sonowal	Assam Police	Posthumous
2013	Lieutenant Commander	Abhilash Tomy	Indian Navy	
2013	Major	Mahesh Kumar, SM	The Punjab Regiment	
2013	Major	Anup Joseph Manjali	The Bihar Regiment	
2012	Lieutenant	Sushil Khajuria	The Army Service Corps	Posthumous
2012	Captain	Ashutosh Kumar	The Rajputana Rifles	
2012	Lieutenant Colonel	Kamaldeep Singh	The Rajputana Rifles	
2011	Naik	Rajinder Singh	The Rajputana Rifles	
2011	Lieutenant	Vikas Sharma	6th Battalion, The Parachute Regiment	
2011	Lieutenant	Vikram Ajit Deshmukh	The Madras Regiment	
2011	Major	Rahul Gurung	The Corps of Engineers	
2011	Captain	Deepak Sharma	The Corps of Signals	Posthumous
2010	Kumari	Rukhsana Kosser	Indian Civilian	
2010	Shri	Ajaz Ahmed	Indian Civilian	
2010	Shri	Bhopal Singh	SSB	Posthumous
2010	Constable	Rel Deo Sangma	Meghalaya Police	Posthumous
2010	Superintendent of Police	Vinod Kumar Choubey	Indian Police Service	Posthumous
2010	Captain	Davinder Singh Jass	1st Battalion, The Parachute Regiment	Posthumous
2010	Major	Suresh Suri	The Kumaon Regiment	Posthumous
2010	Major	Pushpendar Singh	The Rajputana Rifles	

=== Kirti Chakra recipients 2010-2019 and service ===
Award recipients by year
Year	Number of recipients
2010	08
2011	05
2012	03
2013	04
2014	03
2015	05
2016	04
2017	07
2018	02
2019	06

Award recipients by service
Field	Number of recipients
Army	30
Air Force	01
Navy	01
Civilians	02
State Police	05
CAPF	07
Paramilitary	01
Foreigners	00

== 2000–2009 ==
Year	Rank	Name	Service/Regiment	Notes
2009	Paratrooper	Shabir Ahmad Malik	Para SF	Posthumous
2009	Major	Deepak Tewari	Indian Army Corps of EME	
2009	Major	Amit Oscar Fernandes	Maratha Light Infantry	
2009	Naik	Rishikesh Gujjar	Rajput Regiment	
2009	Sapper	V. Sathish	Indian Army Corps of Engineers	
2009	Naik	Tape Yajo	Assam Rifles	
2009	Havildar	Rale Santosh Tanaji	Maratha Light Infantry	
2009	Subedar	Indra Bahadur Pun	Para SF	
2009	Captain	Paras Limboo	Assam Rifles	
2009	Captain	Zala Ajitkumar Arshibhai	Para SF	
2009	Lieutenant Colonel	Osiris Das	Kumaon Regiment	
2009	Lieutenant Colonel	Saurabh Singh Shekhawat, SC SM VSM	Para SF	
2008	Constable	Roop Singh	ITBP	Posthumous
2008	Constable	Ajay Singh Pathania	ITBP	Posthumous
2008	Shri	V. Venkateswara Rao	Indian Foreign Service	Posthumous
2008	Captain	Sunil Kumar Choudhary, SM	11th Gorkha Rifles	Posthumous
2008	Major	Rajinder Kumar Sharma, SC SM	The Grenadiers	
2008	Major	Sushil Kumar Singh	Bihar Regiment	
2008	Major	Nungleppam Buddhimanta Singh, SM VSM	Rajput Regiment	
2008	Lieutenant Colonel	Manish Shashikant Kadam	Punjab Regiment	Posthumous
2008	Brigadier	Ravi Datt Mehta	Military Intelligence	Posthumous
2008	Sepoy	Suresh	Jat Regiment	Posthumous
2008	Major	Subhash Chand Punia	Para SF	
2008	Major	Kumandur Prabhakar Vinay	Regiment of Artillery	Posthumous
2008	Major	Shatrujeet Kotwal	Jat Regiment	
2007	Sub Inspector	Dhirendra Nath Pratap Singh	CISF	Posthumous
2007	Shri	Dyanand Pandey	Bashkari Sub Post Office	Posthumous
2007	Shri	Tarun Kumar Dutta	Indian Civilian	Posthumous
2007	Shri	Mohd. Shan Ahmed	Jhansi Head Post Office	Posthumous
2007	Naik	Radhakrishnan C	Madras Regiment	Posthumous
2007	Captain	Abhinav Handa	Maratha Light Infantry	
2007	Lieutenant Colonel	Pankaj Kumar	11 Gorkha Rifles	
2007	Havildar	Manjit Singh	Sikh Regiment	
2007	Lieutenant	Natarajan Parthiban	Jammu and Kashmir Light Infantry	Posthumous
2007	Captain	Vishal Bhandral	Garhwal Rifles	Posthumous
2007	Major	Manish Hiraji Pitambare	Para SF	Posthumous
2007	Colonel	Gurbir Singh Sarna	The Grenadiers	Posthumous
2006	Fireman	Vijay Pal Singh	Uttar Pradesh Fire Service	Posthumous
2006	Bank Guard	Rugha Ram	Punjab and Sind Bank	Posthumous
2006	Sub Inspector	Sanjeev	Andaman and Nicobar Police	Posthumous
2006	Major	James Thomas	Sikh Light Infantry	Posthumous
2006	Subedar	Jagat Bahadur Ghale	5 Gorkha Rifles	Posthumous
2005	Captain	Sajjan Singh Malik	Para SF	Posthumous
2005	Wing Commander	Balakrishna Pillai Sreebhavan Krishna Kumar	Indian Air Force	
2005	Wing Commander	Sudhir Kumar Sharma	Indian Air Force	
2004	Second In Command	Narendra Nath Dhar Dubey	Border Security Force	
2004	Constable	C. Stanly	Border Security Force	Posthumous
2004	Lieutenant	Dheerendra Singh Atri	Army Service Corps	Posthumous
2004	Lieutenant	Kanavdeep Singh	Sikh Regiment	Posthumous
2004	Major	Ajay Kothiyal	Garhwal Rifles	
2003	Sub Inspector	Ravi Jee Fotedar	Jammu and Kashmir Police	Posthumous
2003	Commandant	Virendra Prasad Purohit	Border Security Force	Posthumous
2003	Rifleman	Surjan Singh Bhandari	National Security Guards	Posthumous
2003	Grenadier	Anil Kumar	The Grenadiers	Posthumous
2003	Sepoy	Sarwan Kumar Dhukiya	34 RR/ JAT REGIMENT	Posthumous
2003	Lance Naik	Sohanvir	JAT REGIMENT	Posthumous
2003	Subedar	Dil Bahadur Thapa	ASSAM REGIMENT	
2003	Captain	Dilip Kumar Jha	JAT REGIMENT/ AOC	Posthumous
2003	Major	Inderjeet Singh Babbar	Artillery	Posthumous
2003	Naik	Tarlok Singh	Mahar Regiment	
2003	Havildar	Rudal Prasad	Bihar Regiment	Posthumous
2002	Head Constable	Bijender Singh	Delhi Police	Posthumous
2002	Head Constable	Ghan Shyam	Delhi Police	Posthumous
2002	Head Constable	Om Prakash	Delhi Police	
2002	Assistant Sub Inspector	Ram Pal	Delhi Police	Posthumous
2002	Assistant Sub Inspector	Nanak Chand	Delhi Police	Posthumous
2002	Naib Subedar	Dev Bahadur Thapa	4 Gorkha Rifles	Posthumous
2002	Naib Subedar	Ishwar Singh	Parachute Regiment	
2002	Major	Ushnisha Jaitly	11 Gorkha Rifles	Posthumous
2002	Lance Havildar	Jora Singh	Sikh Light Infantry	Posthumous
2002	Havildar	Lashkar Singh	Sikh Regiment	Posthumous
2002	Major	Avinash Singh Bhadauria	Madras Regiment	Posthumous
2002	Major	Subhash Chand Rana	Sikh Regiment	
2001	Captain	Pankaj Dhyani	Dogra Regiment	
2001	Lieutenant	Mayekar Narendra Atmaram	Indian Army Corps of EME	Posthumous
2001	Lieutenant	Ravinder Chhikara	The Grenadiers	Posthumous
2001	Captain	R Subramanian	Para SF	Posthumous
2001	Major	Pradeep R Tathawade	Jammu and Kashmir Light Infantry	Posthumous
2001	Corporal	Akhilesh Kumar Mishra	Indian Air Force	
2001	Wing Commander	Rajiv Kothiyal	Indian Air Force	
2000	Captain	Amit Semwal	Dogra Regiment	Posthumous
2000	Major	Deepak Mehra	5 Gorkha Rifles	
2000	Lance Naik	Ram Chander Bhatt	9 Gorkha Rifles	Posthumous
2000	Subedar	Daljit Singh	Dogra Regiment	Posthumous
2000	Major	Shushil Aima	AD Artillery	Posthumous
2000	Major	Joginder Singh Tanwar	3 Gorkha Rifles	

== 1990–1999 ==
Year	Rank	Name	Service/Regiment	Notes
1999	Sepoy	Balbir Singh	Punjab Regiment	Posthumous
1999	Naik	Tikaram Thapa	Assam Rifles	Posthumous
1999	Naik	Narayan Das	Assam Rifles	Posthumous
1999	Havildar	Raksh Paul	Dogra Regiment	Posthumous
1999	Naib Subedar	Jagroop Singh	Punjab Regiment	Posthumous
1999	Major	Raman Dada	Sikh Regiment	Posthumous
1999	Sepoy	Sanjeev Singh	Dogra Regiment	Posthumous
1999	Naik	Gee Varghese KD	Assam Rifles	Posthumous
1999	Havildar	Badri Lal Lunawat	ParaSF	
1998	Shri	Balai Chandra Maity	Indian Civilian	Posthumous
1998	Naik	Vishwa Kerketta	Bihar Regiment	Posthumous
1998	Naik	Gopal Singh	Kumaon Regiment	Posthumous
1998	Captain	Anil Kumar	Dogra Regiment	
1998	Major	Ashok Kumar Sahrawat	Sikh Light Infantry	Posthumous
1998	Major	Padmanabhan Srikumar	AD Artillery	Posthumous
1998	Major	Braj Kishore Sharma	Artillery	Posthumous
1998	Major	Sukhwinder Jeet Singh Randhawa	Artillery	Posthumous
1997	Rifleman	Sanjay Sahi	Garhwal Rifles	Posthumous
1997	Sepoy	Daya Shankar	Mechanized Infantry	Posthumous
1997	Major	Krishna Murthy Balasubramaniam	Artillery	Posthumous
1996	Shri	Poojari Manikyam	Sarpanch	Posthumous
1996	Naik	Bhim Singh	Pioneer	Posthumous
1996	Lieutenant Colonel	Sunil Kumar Razdan	ParaSF	
1995	Lance Naik	Mahaveer Singh Rajput	Rajput Regiment	Posthumous
1995	Lance Havildar	Nek Singh, SC	Jammu and Kashmir Rifles	Posthumous, also a recipient of the Shaurya Chakra
1995	Havildar	Dhanaraj Muthappan	Madras Regiment	
1995	Subedar	Hem Bahadur Thapa	Assam Rifles	Posthumous
1995	Captain	Devashish Sharma	Army Medical Corps	Posthumous
1995	Captain	Arjun Singh Guleria	Artillery	
1995	Havildar	Shiv Narayan Singh	Rajput Regiment	Posthumous
1995	Company Havildar Major	Jagtap Shivaji Balu	Maratha Light Infantry	Posthumous
1995	Second Lieutenant	Rishi Ashok Malhotra	Maratha Light Infantry	Posthumous
1994	Shri	Ugrasen Sahoo	School Teacher	Posthumous
1994	Havildar	Madan Sarup	Dogra Regiment	Posthumous
1994	Sepoy	Satnam Singh	Sikh Light Infantry	Posthumous
1994	Sepoy	Gurtej Singh Gill	Punjab Regiment	Posthumous
1994	Sepoy	Ram Swaroop Gujar	Rajput Regiment	Posthumous
1994	Lance Naik	Jagjit Singh	Sikh Regiment	Posthumous
1994	Naik	Nawab Singh Tomar	Rajputana Rifles	Posthumous
1994	Naik	Kannalan Kennady V	Madras Regiment	Posthumous
1994	Naib Subedar	Baldev Raj	Jammu and Kashmir Rifles	Posthumous
1994	Subedar	Rewal Singh	Jammu and Kashmir Rifles	
1993	Srimati	Nirmal Kanta	School Principal	
1993	Sepoy	Gouri Shanker Sah	Bihar Regiment	Posthumous
1993	Major	Ivan Joseph Crasto	Para SF	
1992	Shri	Pandillapalli Srinivas	Indian Forest Service	Posthumous
1992	Sepoy	Swaran Singh	Dogra Regiment	Posthumous
1992	Naik	Hari Singh	Rajputana Rifles	Posthumous
1992	Naib Subedar	Padam Bahadur Chhatri	Assam Rifles	
1992	Subedar	Nopa Ram	Jat Regiment	Posthumous
1992	Major	Mohinder Singh Pathania	Punjab Regiment	
1992	Colonel	Inderjit Singh, VSM	Infantry	
1992	Flight Lieutenant	Mysore Krishnaswamy Ramaprasad	Indian Air Force	
1991	Civil Engineer	Raj Pal Singh Rana	Border Road Organisation	
1991	Lance Naik	Charan Singh	Punjab Regiment	
1991	Naik	Bansode YM	ParaSF	Posthumous
1991	Naik	Parkash Chand	The Grenadiers	Posthumous
1991	Captain	Rakesh Rana	Bihar Regiment	
1991	Major	Anurag Nauriyal	Gorkha Rifles	Posthumous
1990	OEM	G Pillai	Border Road Organisation	Posthumous
1990	OEM	Abhimanu	Border Road Organisation	
1990	OEM	Kanshi Ram	Border Road Organisation	Posthumous
1990	CH/Man	GB Patnaik	Border Road Organisation	Posthumous
1990		Kedarnath	Indian Civilian	

== 1980–1989 ==
Year	Rank	Name	Service/Regiment	Notes
1989	Shri	Ashok Kumar Sharma	Indian Forest Service	
1989	OEM	Satey Singh	Border Road Organisation	
1989	SPR/OEM	Ajmer Ali	Border Road Organisation	Posthumous
1989	Range Forest Officer	Shaktisinh Samantsinh Visana	Gujarat Forest Service	Posthumous
1989		Jashoda Pal	IndianCivilian	
1989	Range Forest Officer	Arvind D Hegde	Karnataka Forest Service	Posthumous
1989	Shri	Ajit Kumar Doval	Indian Police Service	
1989	Shri	Phu Dorjee	Mountaineer	Posthumous
1989	Havildar	Prem Nath Rai	EME	Posthumous
1989	ALD	Krishan Dev Kushwah	Armoured Corps	Posthumous
1989	Wing Commander	Daljit Singh Minhas	Indian Air Force	Posthumous
1988	Naib Subedar	PG Ram Gopal	Border Road Organisation	
1988	DME	Naresh Kumar	Border Road Organisation	Posthumous
1988	OEM	Harjinder Singh	Road Maintenance Platoon	
1988	Shri	Shiv Kumar Yadav	Civil Engineer	Posthumous
1988	Bank Guard	Harak Singh Karam Singh	Union Bank of India	Posthumous
1988	Daftary	Hasmukh Badriprasad Shah	Bank of India	
1988	Peon	Rajinder Singh Panwar	Bank of Baroda	
1988	Naib Subedar	Chander Singh	Assam Rifles	Posthumous
1988	Havildar	Shivaji Krishna Patil	The Corps of Engineers	Posthumous
1988	Wing Commander	Maheshwar Dutt	Indian Air Force	
1987	Manager	Y Sreehari Sarma	Andhra Bank	Posthumous
1987	Manager	Ghulam Nabi Magrey	Jammu and Kashmir Bank Limited	Posthumous
1987	Shri	Ajay Kumar Klair	Indian Civilian	Posthumous
1987	Brigadier	Manohar Lal Garg, AVSM (Retd.)	Indian Civilian	
1987	Subedar	Ram Das (Retd.)	Indian Civilian	
1987	Second Lieutenant	Pradipta Narayan Mohapatra	Sikh Light Infantry	
1987	Major	Ashok Kumar Singh, SM	The Corps of Engineers	
1987	Major	Mahavir Singh Balhara, SM	Bihar Regiment	
1987	Squadron Leader	Pradeep Sharma	Indian Air Force	
1986	Shri	Bundu Khan	Indian Civilian	Posthumous
1986	Rifleman	Gopal Chand	Assam Rifles	Posthumous
1986	Havildar	Indra Bahadur Gurung	Artillery	
1986	Major	Jai Vardhan Bahuguna, SM, VSM	The Corps of Engineers	Posthumous Also the recipient of Sena Medal, Vishist Seva Medal
1985	BR-II	RN Guleria	Border Road Organisation	Posthumous
1985	Shri	Bachan Singh Sadhrao	Border Road Organisation	
1985	Caretaker	Jai Ram	Aligarh Head Post Office	Posthumous
1985	Shri	RB Kulkarni	Civil Engineer	
1985	Captain	Anoop Kumar Chandhok	Jammu and Kashmir Rifles	
1985	Lieutenant Colonel	Satya Swaroop Sharma	The Corps of Engineers	
1985	Paratrooper	Jagpal Singh	Parachute Regiment	
1985	Havildar	Varghese Mathew	Madras Regiment	
1985	Havildar	Chander Pal Thakar	Dogra Regiment	Posthumous
1985	Havildar	Sarwan Singh	Brigade of the Guards	Posthumous
1985	Naib Subedar	K George Koshy	Madras Regiment	Posthumous
1985	Subedar	Mahavir Singh Yadav	Parachute Regiment	Posthumous
1985	Subedar	Karuppan Palath Raman Ravi	Madras Regiment	Posthumous
1985	Captain	Anil Malhotra	Kumaon Regiment	
1985	Captain	Vinod Kumar Naik	Garhwal Rifles	
1985	Captain	Hardev Singh	Mechaniseed Infantry	
1985	Major	Hitesh Kumar Palta	Kumaon Regiment	Posthumous
1985	Lieutenant Colonel	Israr Rahim Khan	Brigade of the Guards	
1985	Lieutenant Colonel	Tejindar Singh	Garhwal Rifles	
1985	Wing Commander	Ravish Malhotra	Indian Air Force	
1984	Shri	Arvinder Pal Singh	Indian Civilian	
1984	Shri	Suresh Kumar	Indian Civilian	Posthumous
1984	Shri	Mohd Yakub Ali	Teacher	Posthumous
1984	Lance Naik	Ramesh Singh	Kumaon Regiment	Posthumous
1984	Major	Ajay Nand Bahuguna	Jammu and Kashmir Rifles	
1984	Sepoy	Umesh Chandra	Kumaon Regiment	Posthumous
1984	Rifleman	Sripal Chand	Garhwal Rifles	
1984	Naik	Ram Bahadur Chhetri	Assam Rifles	Posthumous
1984	Naik	Tek Bahadur Thapa	Assam Rifles	Posthumous
1984	Captain	Karni Singh Rathore	Rajputana Rifles	
1984	Major	Neelakantan Jayachandran Nair	Maratha Light Infantry	
1984	Squadron Leader	Hari Nath Chaturvedi VM	Indian Air Force	
1983	Shri	Surinder Singh	Indian Civilian	
1983	Brigadier	Som Parkash Jhingon	Infantry	
1983	Squadron Leader	Visvanathan Nagarajan	Indian Air Force	
1982	BR-II	AK Maji	Border Road Organisation	Posthumous
1982	Shri	Hara Lal Sil	Indian Civilian	Posthumous
1982	Naib Subedar	Umaid Singh	Rajputana Rifles	
1982	Captain	Ajit Singh	Bihar Regiment	
1982	Naik	Megh Raj Singh	Rajputana Rifles	Posthumous
1982	Havildar	Amar Singh	Rajputana Rifles	Posthumous
1982	Granadier	Gopal Singh	The Granadiers	Posthumous
1982	Granadier	Bajrang Singh	The Granadiers	Posthumous
1982	Lance Naik	Ravi Singh	Jammu and Kashmir Rifles	
1982	Major	Ram Singh Saharan	Jat Regiment	
1982	Lieutenant Colonel	Rama Prasad Sinh	Jammu and Kashmir Rifles	
1982	Colonel	Narinder Kumar, PVSM, AVSM	Kumaon Regiment	Also a recipient of PVSM and AVSM
1982	Flight Lieutenant	Sankara Iyer Chandrasekhar	Indian Air Force	
1981	Shri	S Bhaga Panickar	Mechanical Engineer	
1981	Pioneer	Ram Adhir	GREF	
1981	Shri	Tsangu Khemnungan	Village Guards	Posthumous
1981	Havildar	Pukhu Khemnungan	Village Guards	
1981	Shri	Sanjay Chopra	Indian Civilian	Posthumous
1981	Kumari	Geeta Chopra	Indian Civilian	Posthumous
1981	Rifleman	Parshotam Dass	Jammu and Kashmir Rifles	Posthumous
1981	Flight Lieutenant	Anil Kumar Mathur	India Air Force	
1980	Major	Sukhdev Singh	Punjab Regiment	Posthumous

== 1970–1979 ==
Year	Rank	Name	Service/Regiment	Notes
1979	Sub Overseer	Ram Dulare Lal	General Reserve Engineer Force	Posthumous
1979	Shri	Nathan Singh	Indian Civilian	
1979	Shri	Kayum Khan	Bus Driver	
1979	Kumari	K Bina	Indian Civilian	
1979	Naik	Pratap Singh	Intelligence	Posthumous
1979	Subedar	Bakhtawar Singh	Punjab Regiment	Posthumous
1979	Group Captain	Denzil Keelor	Indian Air Force	
1978	Shri	Kanwar Lal Sareen	Pipeline Engineer	
1978	Shri	Kurpati	Indian Civilian	
1978	Squadron Leader	Deepak Yadav	Indian Air Force	Posthumous
1978	Sepoy	Dhan Singh	Army Medical Corps	Posthumous
1978	Signalman	Rama Rao Dattatarya Deshmukh	Signals	Posthumous
1978	Lance Naik	Hoshiar Singh	Rajputana Rifles	Posthumous
1978	Naik	Nima Dorjee Sherpa	3 Gorkha Rifles	
1978	Naik	Ajit Singh	The Corps of Engineer	Posthumous
1978	Major	Prem Chand, VSM	Dogra Regiment	
1976	Shri	Mulaoo Rawat	Indian Civilian	Posthumous
1976	Lance Naik	Attar Singh	Artillery	Posthumous
1976	Company Havildar Major	Susai Pilleei Micheal	Madras Regiment	Posthumous
1975	Shri	Swarn Singh Boparai	Indian Civilian	
1975	Havildar	Jogendra Singh Sen, VrC	9 Gorkha Rifles	
1975	Naib Subedar	Kalyan Singh	Assam Rifles	
1975	Commandant	Zuheto Swu	Border Security Force	
1974	Petty Officer TAS-1	Gur Iqbal Singh	Indian Navy	Posthumous
1973	Shri	Pati Ram	Indian Civilian	
1973	Shri	ShriKrishna Kirar	Indian Civilian	
1973	Shri	Pritam Kirar	Indian Civilian	
1973	Shri	Hazari	Indian Civilian	
1973	Major	Mohinder Singh Kadyan	Jat Regiment	
1973	Naib Subedar	Daya Nand	Jat Regiment	
1973	Captain	Harpal Singh Ahluwalia	Jat Regiment	Posthumous
1973	Naik	Mohammad Dar	PNR	
1972	Shri	MN Singh	Civil Engineer	
1972	Shri	Suresh Dwarka Nath Gavaskar	Indian Civilian	
1972	Shri	PV Puranik	Civil Engineer	
1972	Shri	Mahendra Narain Singh	Indian Civilian	
1972	Shri	Hanumant Singh	Indian Civilian	
1972	Shri	Rabindra Nath Gupta	Foreman	
1972	Shri	Daula	Chowkidar	
1972	Major	Shachindra Kumar Sharma	The Corps of Engineers	
1972	Flight Sergeant	Moj Parkash Puri	Indian Air Force	
1972	Flight Lieutenant	Kuldeep Kumar Sharma	Indian Air Force	
1971	Captain	Ransher Singh Ranawat	Brigade of the Guards	
1971	Naik	Jagbir Singh	Rajput Regiment	Posthumous
1971	Shri	Vila Pralie Angami, SC		Posthumous
1970	Shri	Sham Sunder	Indian Civilian	
1970	Shri	Suraj	Indian Civilian	
1970	Shri	Natthe	Indian Civilian	
1970	Shri	Kalloo	Indian Civilian	
1970	Shri	Gopi	Indian Civilian	

== 1960–1969 ==
Year	Rank	Name	Service/Regiment	Notes
1969	Shri	Vishwanath Singh	Indian Civilian	
1969	Shri	Mahadev Singh	Indian Civilian	
1969	Shri	Kashiram Singh	Indian Civilian	
1969	Shri	Babu Singh	Indian Civilian	
1969	Shri	Ajab Singh	Indian Civilian	
1969	Shri	Ram Nath	Indian Civilian	
1969	Shri	Ram Bharose	Indian Civilian	
1969	Naik	Tek Bahadur Chhetri	Assam Rifles	
1969	Subedar	Dhian Singh	Sikh Regiment	
1969	Captain	Dinesh Prasad Mathur	Brigade of the Guards	
1969	Pioneer	Mool Singh	Pioneer	Posthumous
1969	Sepoy	Gorakh Nath Singh	Bihar Regiment	Posthumous
1969	Lance Naik	Jitendra Biswas	Army Service Corps	
1969	Captain	Sreeram Raju Kosuri	Assam Rifles	
1968	Shri	Bishal Singh	Indian Civilian	Posthumous
1968	Subedar	Chalhnuna Lushai	Assam Rifles	
1968	Captain	Allah Noor Kathat	Assam Rifles	Posthumous
1968	Corporal	Sukumar Ghosh	Indian Air Force	
1966	Shri	Tilak Raj Khanna	Indian Civilian	
1966	Shri	Satish Sood	Indian Civilian	
1966	Shri	Preet Pal Singh	Indian Civilian	
1966	Shri	Arun Khanna	Indian Civilian	
1966	Shri	Kirpal Singh Dhingra	Indian Civilian	
1966	Shri	Jia Lal Gupta	Electrical Engineer	
1966	Shri	Partapa	Indian Railways	
1966	Squadron Leader	Vishwanath Balkrishna Sawardekar	Indian Air Force	
1965	Shri	Patric Edward Crizzle	Indian Railways	Posthumous
1965	Subedar	Zhevishe Sema	Village Guard	
1965	Shri	Angami	Indian Civilian	
1964	Shri	Samiran Kumar Roy	India Steamship	Posthumous
1964	Shri	Alan Fredrick Richtor	India Steamship	
1964	Shri	Abdul Razakali	India Steamship	Posthumous
1964	Shri	Haran Chandra Misra	India Steamship	Posthumous
1964	Shri	Medandra Krishna Kumar	India Steamship	Posthumous
1964	Shri	Sureshwar Datta	India Steamship	Posthumous
1964	Shri	Razo Sopu Angami	Village Guard	
1964	Major	Dwarka Nath Kanwarpal	Assam Rifles	
1964	Lance Naik	Karna Bahadur Gurung	Assam Rifles	
1964	Naik	Karna Bahadur Rai	Assam Rifles	Posthumous
1964	Second Lieutenant	Preminder Singh	Indian Army Corps of Engineers	Posthumous
1963	Shri	Allika Venkata Rao	Indian Railways	Posthumous
1963	Naik	Ranjit Singh	Dogra Regiment	Posthumous
1962	Flight Lieutenant	Jagannath Vijayaraghavan	Indian Air Force	Posthumous
1962	Flight Lieutenant	Karan Sher Singh Kalsia	Indian Air Force	Posthumous
1962	Flight Lieutenant	Madhusudan Ray	Indian Air Force	Posthumous
1962	Flying Officer	Vaidyanathan Ganesan	Indian Air Force	Posthumous
1962	Flight Lieutenant	Balkrishan Desoares	Indian Air Force	
1962	Flight Lieutenant	Raj Kumar Mehta	Indian Air Force	Posthumous
1962	Ordinary Seaman	Bechan Singh	Indian Navy	Posthumous
1962	Senior Commissioned Gunner	Noel Kelman	Indian Navy	
1962	Ordinary Seaman	VijendraI Pal Singh Tomar	Indian Navy	Posthumous
1962	Rifleman	Bir Singh Negi	Garhwal Rifles	
1961	Shri	Imti Mayang	Village Guards	
1961	Shri	Percival Douglas Carroll	Indian Railways	Posthumous
1961	Squadron Leader	Ayappan Sudhakaran	Indian Air Force	Posthumous
1961	Rifleman	Hans Raj	Jammu and Kashmir Rifles	Posthumous
1961	Major	Parayil Bhaskaran	Madras Regiment	
1960	Subedar	Pfudilhu Angami	Village Guards	
1960	Captain	Sampuran Singh Grewal	Indian Airlines	
1960	Lieutenant Colonel	Jamshed Bhurjorji Dorabji	Assam Rifles	
1960	Sepoy	Chuhar Singh	Sikh Light Infantry	
1960	Subedar	Sat Lal Pun	8 Gorkha Rifles	
1960	Second Lieutenant	Raj Mohan Sharma	Jammu and Kashmir Light Infantry	

== 1952–1959 ==
Total 55 recipients were awarded between 1952 and 1959. Highest awardees in 1957 were 13.

=== Kirti Chakra recipients 1952-1959 and service ===
Award recipients by year
Year	Number of recipients
1952	12
1953	01
1954	01
1955	02
1956	02
1957	13
1958	11
1959	11

Award recipients by service
Field	Number of recipients
Army	36
Air Force	08
Navy	00
Civilians	05
State Police	00
CAPF	00
Paramilitary	04
Foreigners	00

Year	Rank	Name	Service/Regiment	Notes
1959	Sepoy	Ayomo Lotha	Village Guard	
1959	Shri	Makhimong	Indian Civilian	
1959	Squadron Leader	Reginald Azariah Rufus	Indian Air Force	
1959	Rifleman	Jut Bahadur Thapa	8 Gorkha Rifles	Posthumous
1959	Rifleman	Madho Singh Negi	Garhwal Rifles	Posthumous
1959	Naik	Lal Singh	Rajput Regiment	
1959	Captain	Graman Kastrurirangam Krishna Iyengar	Indian Army Corps of Engineers	
1959	Captain	Harbans Singh	Assam Rifles	
1959	Rifleman	Bhim Bahadur Khattri	9 Gorkha Rifles	
1959	Rifleman	Jaman Singh Gusain	Garhwal Rifles	
1959	Major	Danchand Singh Pratap	3 Gorkha Rifles	
1958	Wing Commander	Nedyam Bhaskar Menon	Indian Airforce	
1958	Wing Commander	Edul Jahangir Dhatigara	Indian Air Force	
1958	Rifleman	Dan Singh Pun	3 Gorkha Rifles	
1958	Rifleman	Tara Prasad Gurung	3 Gorkha Rifles	
1958	Rifleman	Jailal Adhikari	9 Gorkha Rifles	
1958	Sepoy	Suraj Singh	Rajput Regiment	
1958	Sepoy	Ram Deva	Rajput Regiment	Posthumous
1958	Lance Naik	Ran Bahadur Gurung	5 Gorkha Rifles	
1958	Naik	Karnail Singh	Punjab Regiment	Posthumous
1958	Subedar	Sohan Singh	Punjab Regiment	Posthumous
1958	Lieutenant Colonel	Jaswant Singh	Rajput Regiment	
1957	Shri	Manasser Johannes	Indian Railways	Posthumous
1957	Craftsman	Jaikaran	Indian Army Corps of EME	
1957	Lance Naik	Pandit Mane	Maratha Light Infantry	
1957	Major	Amar Sen	Assam Rifles	
1957	Major	Inder Singh Rawat	Assam Rifles	
1957	Major	Denzil Herbert D'Cruz	Assam Rifles	
1957	Sepoy	Mohinder Singh	Sikh Light Infantry	
1957	Sepoy	Parmal Singh	Rajput Regiment	Posthumous
1957	Jemadar	Kulwant Singh	Sikh Regiment	Posthumous
1957	Subedar	Nasib Singh	Sikh Light Infantry	
1957	Captain	Mehta Singh	Sikh Light Infantry	Posthumous
1957	Naik	Mukhtar Singh	Jammu and Kashmir Rifles	
1957	Sepoy	Babu Lal	Rajput Regiment	Posthumous
1956	Jemadar	Sheopujan Singh	Bihar Regiment	
1956	Jemadar	Sham Bahadur Singh	Bihar Regiment	Posthumous
1955	Flight Attendant	Glori Berry	Air India	Posthumous
1955	Havildar	A Somiah	Indian Army Corps of EME	
1954	Major General	Shankarrao Pandurung Patil Thorat	Indian Army	
1953	Flight Lieutenant	Raizada Harbans Chawdhry	Indian Air Force	
1952	Shri	B.B.L. Datt	Indian Civilian	
1952	Flight Sergeant	O. Sundaressiya	Indian Air Force	
1952	Sergeant	Dev Raj Singh	Indian Air Force	
1952	Sergeant	Ram Chandra Dua	Indian Air Force	
1952	Flight Lieutenant	Ulrich Anthony D'Cruz	Indian Air Force	
1952	Sowar	Prithi Singh	Armoured Corps (3rd Cavalry)	
1952	Major	Gurcharan Singh	Artillery (26 Light A.A. Regiment)	
1952	Sepoy	Daryao	The Grenadiers	
1952	Sepoy	Sewa Singh	Sikh Regiment	
1952	Naik	Hardial Singh	Sikh Regiment	Posthumous
1952	Havildar	Amar Singh	Punjab Regiment	
1952	Captain	Joginder Singh Gharaya	Bihar Regiment	

== See also ==
- List of Shaurya Chakra award recipients
