= List of Shaurya Chakra award recipients =

Shaurya Chakra
- Shaurya Chakra and its ribbon, the third highest peacetime decoration of India
- Type: Medal
- Awarded for: Awarded for gallantry otherwise than in the face of the enemy.
- Country: Republic of India
- Presented by: Republic of India
- Eligibility: Officers, men and women of all ranks of the Army, the Navy and the Air Force, of any of the Reserve Forces, of the Territorial Army, Militia and of any other lawfully constituted forces.; Members of the Nursing Services of the Armed Forces.; Civilian Citizens of either sex in all walks of life and members of Police Forces including Central Para-Military Forces and Railway protection Force.
- Post-nominals: SC
- Status: Currently Awarded
- Established: 1952; 74 years ago
- First award: 1952
- Final award: 2021

Highlights
- Total awarded posthumously: 627
- Total recipients: 2122 (As of 2023)

Precedence
- Next (higher): Ati Vishisht Seva Medal

- Equivalent: Vir Chakra

- Next (lower): Yudh Seva Medal

The Shaurya Chakra (lit. 'Wheel of Gallantry') is the third highest peacetime Indian military decoration. This list comprises List of Shaurya Chakra award recipients

== Recipients ==
Year	Rank	Name	Regiment	Notes
1952	Major	P.S. Gahoon	Punjab Regiment	
1952	Second Lieutenant	M Thulasiram	The Corps of Engineers	
1952	Subedar	Kartar Singh, MC	Punjab Regiment	
1952	Jemadar	Samandar Singh	GRS	
1952	Lance Naik	Milkha Singh	Punjab Regiment	
1952	Lance Naik	Bishan Singh	Punjab Regiment	
1952	Sepoy	Shankar Dass	Punjab Regiment	
1952	Lieutenant Colonel	R.A Shebbeare	The Grenadiers	
1952	Major	S.L. Menezes	The Grenadiers	
1952	Major	A.T. Stephenson	Garhwal Rifles	
1952	Subedar Major	Dhan Singh	Artillery	
1952	Havildar	Naranjan Singh	Sikh Regiment	
1952	Lance Daffadar	Sultan Singh	Poona Horse	
1952	Rifleman	Bakhtawar Singh Bhandari	Garhwal Rifles	
1952	Sepoy	Harchand Singh	Sikh Regiment	
1952	Sepoy	Richhpal Singh	The Grenadiers	
1952	Niak	Jograj Singh	Jammu and Kashmir Rifles	
1952	Sepoy	Ram Singh	Para, Kumaon	
	Rifleman	Til Bahadur Gurung	Assam Rifles	
1953	Subedar	Tek Bahadur Sahi	9th Gorkha Rifles	
1953	Sepoy	Thakur Singh	Indian Army Service Corps	
1953	Shri	Baboo Lal	Indian Civilian	
1954	Srimati	Lalita Mukand	Indian Civilian	
1955	Jemadar	Kulbir Thapa	8 Gorkha Rifles	
1955	Rifleman	Ganesh Bahadur Tamang	5 Gorkha Rifles	
1956	Shri	Akshya Kumar Singh	Civilian	
1957	Second Lieutenant	JK Grover	Corps of Signals	
1957	Naik	Sugriv Singh	Rajput Regiment	
1963	Second Lieutenant	Dharam Datt Bhalla	Rajput Regiment	Shaurya Chakra was awarded in Investiture Ceremony that took place on 18 April 1963 for an action that took place on 26 October 1961 when as commander of a small patrol of 3 ORs was given a task to carry out reconnaissance of route from the patrol base at Jaura Dhok to Chinamarg Gali and beyond in high altitude snow covered mountains of Pir Panjal Range. After the patrol covered approximately 4 miles it was fired upon by Pakistani infiltrators of much larger strength. In the encounter some infiltrators were killed others ran away leaving some of their arms and ammunition. Thus the infiltrators failed in their mission of blowing up Kalai Bridge on Rajauri- Poonch road. The Indian Government honored 2LT Dharam Datt Bhalla's bravery with the prestigious Shaurya Chakra award.
1973	Grenadier	Ran Singh	Grenadiers	
1975	Assistant Engineer (Civil)	Kehar Singh Chima	Border Roads Organisation	
1975	Inspector	Vihoi Sema	Border Security Force	
1975	Major	Badal Ghosh	Rajput Regiment	
1976	Second Lieutenant	Akoijam Dinamani Singh*	Sikh Light Infantry	
1976	Lance Naik	Jagbeer Singh	Corps of Signals	
1977	Company Havildar Major	PJ Thimaiah	Corps of Signals	
1980	Sepoy	Manjit Singh*	Punjab Regiment	
1981	Flight Lieutenant	Sumit Mukherjee	Indian Air Force	
1982	Flight Lieutenant	S L Thantry	Indian Air Force	
1983	Sub Lieutenant	Homi Motivala	Indian Navy	
1983	Lieutenant Commander	Mohammud Abdul Raihan Subhan	Indian Navy	LCDR Raihan Subhan was commanding officer of INS Chapal missile boat, on 30th December when a missile launched exploded prematurely, risking the entire ship. He brought the ship back home, scarred but battle worthy, and without any casualties. SLT Motivala listed above was decorated as part of the same operation.
1984	Lieutenant Commander	Kulwant Singh Samra	Indian Navy	
1984	Signalman	MK Sharma	Corps of Signals	Posthumous
1986	Colonel	R K Bansal	Army Postal Service Corps	
1987	Captain	Virinder Singh Grewal	Dogra Regiment	
1990	Squadron Leader	Sanjeev Mishra	Indian Air Force	
1992	Captain	Kishore Geer Bava	Border Roads Organisation	
1997	Subedar	Santokh Singh	Jammu & Kashmir Rifles	On April 21, 1997, in a Counterinsurgency operation in village of Kodom, Senapati District, Manipur. During this operation, he led his company, eliminated eight militants, and demonstrated exceptional courage, comradeship, and dedication to duty with complete disregard for his own safety.
1999	Naik	Urba Datt	3 Kumaon Regiment	On the day of February 23, 1998, a specific intelligence was received that some terrorists are hiding in the Saloor village of Srinagar with an intention to plot explosives on the way of the convoy of VIPs passing through that route. On the same night around 2100h, Sofi Mohalla of that village was cordoned by the army. The next day at 1100h in the morning while searching the last house of the locality Naik Urba Datt noticed some suspicious movement in the heap of hay on the rooftop. He immediately fired however the terrorists jumped off the rooftop into the Nala and ran towards the jungle of Nambal. To this, Naik Urba Dutt too jumped on the Nala and chased the terrorists with a daunting spirit. Despite being severely injured, he gunned down one militant and wounded another militant who succumbed to his injuries later on. This brave soldier also succumbed to his injuries and got martyred. Naik Urba Datt displayed indomitable courage and exemplary valor and laid down his supreme sacrifice on the line of duty for the nation.
	Jemadar	Kulbir Thapa	8 Gorkha Rifles	
	Rifleman	Ganesh Bahadur Jamang	5 Gorkha Rifles	
	Havildar	S.S. Bhardwaj	Army Ordnance Corps	
	Scout	Chatra Ram	Border Scouts	
	Scout	Tara Chand	Border Scouts	
	Scout	Saudagar Singh	Border Scouts	
	Captain	G.S. Grewal	Bihar Regiment	
	Subedar	Khem Chand	The Grenadiers	
	Subedar	Megh Singh	Dogra Regiment	
	Jemadar	Rabe Gurung	4 Gorkha Rifles	
	Havildar	Tek Bahadur Gurung	4 Gorkha Rifles	
	Lance Havildar	Balwant Singh	Sikh Regiment	
	Naik	Raghunath Dange	Parachute Regiment	
	Sepoy	Hans Raj	Punjab Regiment	
	Second Lieutenant	Ram Labhaya	Jat Regiment	
	Sepoy	Narbir Singh	Rajput Regiment	
	Sepoy	Shanker Hembrom	Bihar Regiment	
	Havildar	Murli Ram	GRS	
	Sepoy	Ganak Singh	Jammu and Kashmir Light Infantry	
	Subedar	Mohar Singh	Sikh Regiment	
	Jemadar	Mohinder Singh	Sikh Regiment	
	Jemadar	Tek Bahadur Gurung	8 Gorkha Rifles	
	Naik	Sugam Singh	Rajput Regiment	
	Naik	Padam Singh Gurung	8 Gorkha Rifles	
	Sepoy	Mewa Singh	Sikh Regiment	
	Sepoy	Ranjit Singh	Sikh Regiment	
	Lance Naik	Ganga Prasad Thapa	Assam Rifles	
	Rifleman	Puran Bahadur Rana	Assam Rifles	
	Rifleman	Gogeshwar Kumar	Assam Rifles	
	Second Lieutenant	V.R. Dani	8 Gorkha Rifles	
	Jemadar	Dalip Singh	Sikh Regiment	
	Lance Havildar	Birbal	Corps of Signals	Posthumous
2001	Lance Naik	Chhering Norbu Bodh	Dogra Regiment	CN Bodh's Shaurya Chakra citation: "Lance Naik Chhering Norbu Bodh was selected as a member of the Indian Army Everest Expedition 2001. On 23 May 2001, he was part of the second summit team attempting to summit Everest, after having spent two nights at camp – III (26000 ft). However, blizzards forced them to turn back from 27,000ft. Though exhausted by the effort, he refused to accept defeat. On 23 May 2001, at 2200 hours, he commenced his attempt. Re-entering the Death Zone on Everest above 26,000ft at night required every ounce of physical and mental strength apart from conspicuous courage. He soon started losing strength due to cold, strong winds, poor snow conditions and lack of oxygen. But he continued doggedly and at the same time kept encouraging his team-mates. At Hillary Step he was thoroughly exhausted but in a superhuman effort, he marshalled his remaining energy and clawed his way up the dangerous precipice of rock covered with verglas. His mind fought against loss of energy, numbness in fingers and toes and lack of oxygen but he made it through the step. Then with very little left in him except his mental strength and determination, he willed his body to move. Through this great effort he kept helping and encouraging his team-mates. He finally reached the summit to bring glory to the team and the Army. Lance Naik Chhering Norbu Bodh displayed undaunted determination and conspicuous courage in the face of extreme elements."
2002	Havildar	Radhakrishan Kunju Panicker*	Madras Regiment	
2002	Lieutenant Colonel	Satish Chander Sharma	Dogra Regiment	
2003	Captain	Umang Bharadwaj*	Jat Regiment	
2004	Captain	Krishan Yadav, SM	Army Service Corps	
2007	Major	Rajinder Kumar Sharma	32 Assam Rifles	
2007	Superintendent of Police	Pankaj Sharma	Assam Police	
2007	Captain	Kaushal Kashyap	21 Para (Special Forces)	
2008	petty officer (Marcos)	Praveen Kumar Teotia	Indian Navy	
2009	Rifleman	Mohammad Abdul Amieen Bhat*	Jammu & Kashmir Light Infantry	
2011	Naik	Vijay Pal	Jat Regiment	
2013	Sepoy	Lallawmzuala	Regiment of Artillery / 18th Battalion The Rashtriya Rifles	On 23 July 2013, Sepoy Lallawmzuala was part of the inner cordon deployed at night during search operation based on intelligence about presence of a terrorist in a house. On commencement of search at approximately 6:30 AM, Sepoy Lallawmzuala was amongst the first to enter the house. His deliberate and methodical search revealed the presence of an armed terrorist in a well concealed hideout behind planks and loose earth in the house. Upon being discovered the terrorist opened indiscriminate fire, however, the soldier’s alacrity and outstanding use of field craft enabled him to manoeuvre to an advantageous position within three metres of the terrorist. His courage under fire, calm collected actions and outstanding fire control led to elimination of a top commander of Jaish-e-Mohammad. His actions ensured that the balance of the search party received critical warning at the opportune time, resulting in effective covering fire and no casualty to own troops.
2014	Sepoy	Vikram Singh SC	The Rajput Regiment, 44RR, Kashmir insurgency.	
August 2016	Lance Naik	Om Prakash	9 PARA SF	Posthumous
2016	Captain	Pawan Kumar	10 PARA SF	
2016	Lieutenant	Harjinder Singh	3 Kumaon Rifles (General Service)	
2016	Captain	Tushar Mahajan	9 PARA SF	
2017	Havildar	Mubarik Ali	22 Rastriya Rifles	
2017	Sepoy	Arif Khan	55 Rastriya Rifles	
2018	Major	Satish Dahiya	Army Services Corps	
2018	Captain	Pradeep Shaurya Arya	Parachute Regiment(TA)	
2018	Major	Aditya Kumar	10 Garhwal Rifles	
2018	Major	Abhinav Shukla	PARA SF	
19 March 2019	Pawan Kumar	34 RR	Jat Regiment	Major Pawan Kumar displayed astute tactical acumen, indomitable spirit and raw courage which led to elimination of a hardcore terrorist in September 2017. A top terrorist and the longest surviving terrorist of the valley whilst infiltrating back from Azad Jammu and Kashmir by taking cover of darkness, thick foliage, boulders and folds of the ground was effectively engaging own troops with deadly fire. The dreaded terrorist could have been engaged only with accurate indirect fire. Major Pawan realising the gravity of situation and danger to safety of own troops, undaunted by heavy volumes of fire, displaying raw courage, used folds of the ground to crawl towards the terrorist and closed in the distance. He lobbed a grenade at the terrorist forcing him to expose himself and in a fierce encounter shot him dead from a close quarter. His elimination not only saved lives of own troops but also prevented revival of terrorism in the valley. Major Pawan Kumar displayed perseverance, dedication to duty, unmatched bravery and raw courage in elimination of a hardcore terrorist.
2019	Shri	Irfan Ramzan Sheikh	Civilian	
2020	Deputy Inspector General	Amit Kumar	Indian Police Service	
2020	Colonel	Krishan Singh Rawat, SM	1 PARA SF	Also a recipient of the Sena Medal
2020	Major	Anil Urs	4 Maratha Light Infantry	
2020	Havildar	Alok Kumar Dubey	Rajput Regiment/ 44 RR	
2020	Wing Commander	Vishak Nair	Indian Air Force	
2020	Sub Inspector	Mahaveer Prasad Godara	CISF	Posthumous
2020	Head Constable	Eranna Nayak	CISF	Posthumous
2020	Constable	Mahendra Kumar Paswan	CISF	Posthumous
2020	Constable	Satish Kumar Kushwaha	CISF	Posthumous
2020	Lieutenant Colonel	Jyoti Lama	11 Gorkha Rifles / 37 RR	
2020	Major	Konjengbam Bijendra Singh	AAD/ 23 Assam Rifles	
2020	Deputy Superintendent of Police	Aman Kumar	MHA	Posthumous
2020	Naib Subedar	Narendar Singh	9 PARA SF	
2020	Naib Subedar	Sombir	Jat/ 34 RR	Posthumous
2020	Naik	Naresh Kumarthe	Jammu and Kashmir Light Infantry/ 42 RR	
2020	Sepoy	Karmdeo Oraon	8 Bihar Regiment	
2020	Shri	Challapilla Narasimha Rao	Indian Civilian	Posthumous
2020	Constable	Kamal Kishore	MHA	Posthumous
2021	Group Captain	Perminder Antil	Indian Air Force	
2021	Captain	Sachin Reuben Sequeira	Indian Navy	
2021	Wing Commander	Varun Singh	Indian Air Force	Later died on 2021 Indian Air Force Mil Mi-17 crash
2021	Major	Arun Kumar Pandey	44 RR	
2021	Major	Ravi Kumar Chaudhary	55 RR	
2021	Deputy Commandant	Chitesh Kumar	CRPF	
2021	Captain	Ashutosh Kumar	Madras Regiment	Posthumous
2021	Captain	Vikas Khatri	40 RR	
2021	Sub Inspector	Manjinder Singh	CRPF	
2021	SPO	Shahbaz Ahmad	Jammu Ahmad	Posthumous
2021		Li Kumar	9 RR	
2021	Sepoy	Neeraj Ahlawat	45 RR	
2021	Constable	Sunil Choudhary	CRPF	
2021	Commando	Debasis Sethy	Odisha Police	Posthumous
2021	Commando	Sudhir Kumar Tudu	Odisha Police	Posthumous
2021	Major	Anuj Sood	The Brigade of the Guards/ 21 RR	Posthumous
2021	Inspector	Arshad Khan	Jammu and Kashmir Police	Posthumous
2021	SPO	Bilal Ahmad Magray	Jammu and Kashmir Police	Posthumous
2021	Rifleman	Pranab Jyoti Das	6 Assam Rifles	
2021	Paratrooper	Sonam Tshering Tamang	4 Para SF	
2021	Constable	GH Mustafa	Jammu and Kashmir Police	Posthumous
2021	Constable	Ahmad Kolie	Jammu and Kashmir Police	Posthumous
15 August 2024	Colonel	Pawan Singh	Army Aviation Corps	
15 August 2024	Captain	Sharad Sinsunwal	Indian Navy	
15 August 2024	Wing Commander	Vernon Desmond Keane	Indian Air Force	
15 August 2024	Major	CVS Nikhil	21 Para SF	
15 August 2024	Major	Aashish Dhonchak	Sikh Light Infantry/ 19 RR	Posthumous Also a recipient of the Sena Medal
15 August 2024	Major	Tripatpreet Singh	Army Service Corps/ 34 RR	Also a recipient of Mentioned In Despatches
15 August 2024	Major	Sahil Randhawa	The Regiment ofAritillery/ 34 RR	
15 August 2024	Squadron Leader	Deepak Kumar	Indian Air Force	
15 August 2024	Lieutenant Commander	Kapil Yadav	Indian Navy	
15 August 2024	Deputy Commandant	Lakhveer	CRPF	
15 August 2024	Assistant Commandant	Rajesh Panchal	CRPF	
15 August 2024	Subedar	Sanjeev Singh Jasrotia	5 Jammu and Kashmir Rifles	
15 August 2024	Naib Subedar	Pabin Singha	The Regiment of Artillery/ 56 RR	
15 August 2024	SPO	Abdul Latif	Jammu and Kashmir Police/ 33 RR	
15 August 2024	Sepoy	Pardeep Singh	Sikh Light Infantry/	Posthumous
15 August 2024	Constable	Pawan Kumar	CRPF	Posthumous
15 August 2024	Constable	Devan C	CRPF	Posthumous
15 August 2024	Constable	Malkit Singh	CRPF	
26 January 2024	Wing Commander	Shailesh Singh	Indian Air Force	
26 January 2024	Major	Maneo Francis	21 PARA SF	
26 January 2024	Major	Amandeep Jakhar	4 Sikh Regiment	
26 January 2024	Captain	MV Pranjal	The Corps of Signals/ 63 RR	Posthumous
26 January 2024	Captain	Akshat Upadhyay	20 Jat Regiment	
26 January 2024	Flight Lieutenant	Hrishikesh Jayan Karuthedath	Indian Air Force	
26 January 2024	Lieutenant	Bimal Ranjan Behera	Indian Navy	
26 January 2024	Assistant Commandant	Bibhor Kumar Singh	205 COBRA, CRPF	
26 January 2024	Deputy Superintendent of Police	Mohan Lal	Jammu and Kashmir Police	
26 January 2024	Naib Subedar	Baria Sanjay Kumar Bhamar Sinh	21 Mahar Regiment	
26 January 2024	Sub Inspector	Faroz Ahmad Dar	Jammu and Kashmir Police	
26 January 2024	Havildar	Baria Sanjay Kumar Bhamar Sinh	9 Assam Rifles	
26 January 2024	Assistant Sub Inspector	Amit Raina	Jammu and Kashmir Police	
26 January 2024	Rifleman	Alok Rao	18 Assam Rifles	Posthumous
26 January 2024	Constable	Varun Singh	Jammu and Kashmir Police	
26 January 2024	Shri	Parshotam Kumar	Civilian of Jammu and Kashmir	
15 August 2025	Lieutenant Colonel	Neetesh Bharti Shukla	Sikh Regiment	
15 August 2025	Wing Commander	Abhimanyu Singh	Indian Air Force	
15 August 2025	Major	Bhargav Kalita	Kumaon Regiment/ 50 Rashtriya Rifles	
15 August 2025	Major	Ashish Kumar	7 Para Special Forces	
15 August 2025	Major	Aditya Pratap Singh	Rajputana Rifles/ 44 Rashtriya Rifles	Also a recipient of the Sena Medal
15 August 2025	Lieutenant Commander	Suraj Prashar	Indian Navy	
15 August 2025	Assistant Commandant	Mohd Shafiq	Assam Rifles	
15 August 2025	Subedar	Shamsher Singh	4 Para Special Forces	
15 August 2025	Inspector	Laxman Kewat	MHA	
15 August 2025	Inspector	Rameshwar Prasad Deshmukh	MHA	
15 August 2025	Lance Naik	Rahul Singh	4 Para Special Forces	
15 August 2025	Rifleman	Bhoj Ram Sahu	Assam Rifles	
15 August 2025	Seaman II	Ram Goyal	Indian Navy	
15 August 2025	Constable	Saddam Hussain	MHA	
15 August 2025	Constable	Feda Hussain Dar	MHA	
15 August 2025	Constable	Sanjay Tiwari	MHA	
26 January 2025	Major	Ashish Dahiya	Corps of Engineers/ 50 Rashtriya Rifles	
26 January 2025	Major	Kunal	Army Service Corps/ 1 Rashtriya Rifles	
26 January 2025	Major	Satender Dhankar	Armoured Corps/ 4 Rashtriya Rifles	
26 January 2025	Captain	Deepak Singh	The Corps of Signals/ 48 Rashtriya Rifles	Posthumous
26 January 2025	Assistant Commandant	Eshenthung K	4 Assam Rifles	
26 January 2025	Subedar	Vikas Tomar	1 Para Special Forces	
26 January 2025	Subedar	Mohan Ram	Jat Regiment	
26 January 2025	Havildar	Rohit Kumar Dogra	High Altitude Warfare School	Posthumous
26 January 2025	Havildar	Prakash Tamang	Gorkha Rifles/ 32 Rashtriya Rifles	
26 January 2025	Flight Lieutenant	Aman Singh Hans	Indian Air Force	
26 January 2025	Corporal	Dabhi Sanjay Hiffabai Essa	Indian Air Force	
26 January 2025	OEM	Vijayan Kutty G	BRDB	Posthumous
26 January 2025	Deputy Commandant	Vikrant Kumar	CRPF	
26 January 2025	Inspector	Jeffrey Hmingchullo	CRPF	
26 January 2026	Assistant Commandant	Vipin Wilson	CRPF	https://www.thehindu.com/news/national/kerala/shaurya-chakra-awardee-vipin-wilson-a-crpf-officer-honoured-in-thrissur/article70990812.ece https://crpf.gov.in/Hero-Listing/7

== See also ==
- List of Kriti Chakra award recipients
