= Paotinsat Guite =

Indian Border Security Force officer and Kirti Chakra awardee

- Born: 26 October 1994; Maphou Kuki village, Kangpokpi district, Manipur, India
- Died: 1 December 2020 (aged 26); Rajouri district, Jammu and Kashmir, India
- Military career
- Allegiance: India
- Branch: (India) Border Security Force
- Service years: 2019–2020
- Rank: Sub-Inspector
- Units: 59 Battalion, Border Security Force
- Awards: Kirti Chakra

Paotinsat Guite, KC (26 October 1994 – 1 December 2020) was an officer of the Border Security Force (BSF) who was posthumously awarded the Kirti Chakra, India's second-highest peacetime gallantry award. He was killed in action while repelling enemy fire and foiling an infiltration attempt along the Line of Control in Rajouri district of Jammu and Kashmir in 2020.

== Early life and education ==
Paotinsat Guite was born on 26 October 1994 in Maphou Kuki village in Kangpokpi district of the northeastern Indian state of Manipur. He was the son of Tongjang Guite and Veinem Guite. He completed his graduation from DM College of Arts, Imphal. Inspired by a sense of patriotism and service to the nation, he later joined the Border Security Force. Guite underwent his training at the Border Security Force Academy in Tekanpur, Gwalior, and became a Sub-Inspector in 2019.

== Police career ==
After completing training, Guite was posted to the 59 Battalion of the Border Security Force. He was deployed in the Rajouri sector of Jammu and Kashmir along the Line of Control. As a platoon commander, his responsibilities included border surveillance, preventing infiltration attempts, and safeguarding Indian territory in a highly sensitive border region.

== Action ==
On 1 December 2020, a BSF ambush party led by Sub-Inspector Paotinsat Guite came under heavy firing from the Pakistan Army in the Rajouri sector along the Line of Control. The firing occurred during an attempt by militants to infiltrate into Indian territory.

Despite sustaining serious injuries during the exchange of fire, Guite continued to lead his team and returned fire at the enemy positions. His actions helped foil the infiltration attempt and protected his fellow soldiers. He later succumbed to his injuries.

== Kirti Chakra ==
For his conspicuous bravery, leadership and supreme sacrifice in the line of duty, Paotinsat Guite was posthumously awarded the Kirti Chakra. The award recognized his courageous action in continuing to engage the enemy despite being grievously wounded and successfully preventing infiltration across the border.

== Legacy ==
Guite's sacrifice has been widely honoured in his home state of Manipur. Tributes have been paid by civil society groups, government officials, and security forces. His bravery is remembered as an example of dedication and courage in service of the nation.

== See also ==
- Kirti Chakra
- Border Security Force
- List of Kirti Chakra award recipients
