= Harshpal Singh =

Indian police officer

Second-in-Command Harshpal Singh KC, PMG**, JPM
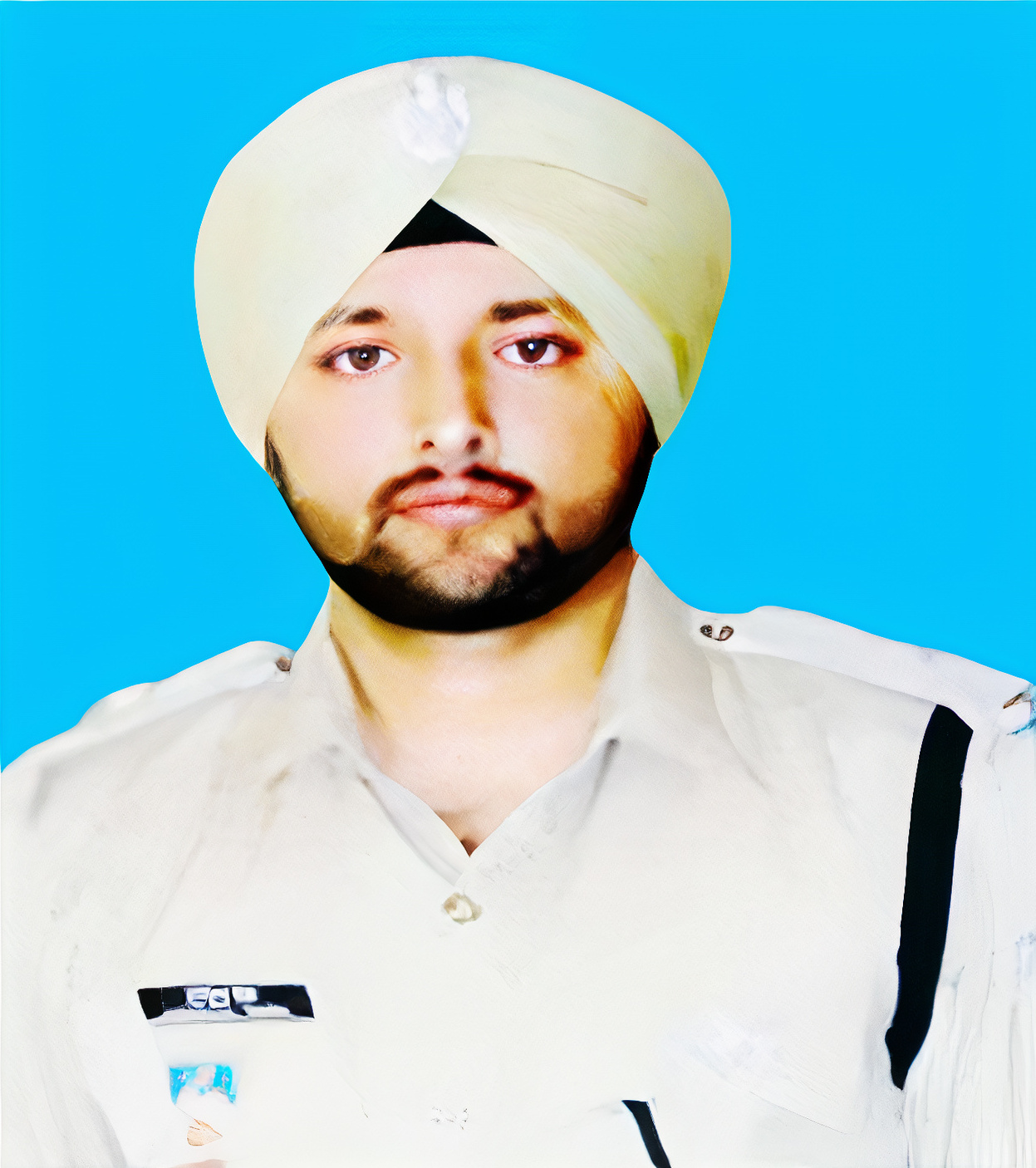
- Born: 1981 (age 44–45)
- Police career
- Allegiance: India
- Branch: Central Reserve Police Force
- Rank: Second-in-Command (2I/C)
- Awards: Kirti Chakra; Police Medal (gallantry); Jharkhand Police Medal

Second-in-Command Harshpal Singh, KC, PMG & two bars, JPM, is a Central Reserve Police Force (CRPF) Officer. He joined the CRPF in 2004. He received the Kirti Chakra, India's second highest peacetime gallantry medal, on 15 August 2019 (73rd Independence Day), for eliminating three terrorists despite being injured.

In 2014, he assassinated a Naxal with a ₹2 lakh (equivalent to ₹3.5 lakh or £2,770 in 2026) bounty on his head in Chhattisgarh's Khunti district. He was awarded the Police Medal (Gallantry) in 2015 for killing the Naxal Zonal Commander in Khunti. Again, in the same year, he received the Police medal from Jharkhand's Chief Minister.
