= Rajinder Kumar Sharma =

Recipient of Kirti Chakra and Shaurya Chakra

Colonel Rajinder Kumar Sharma KC, SC, SM
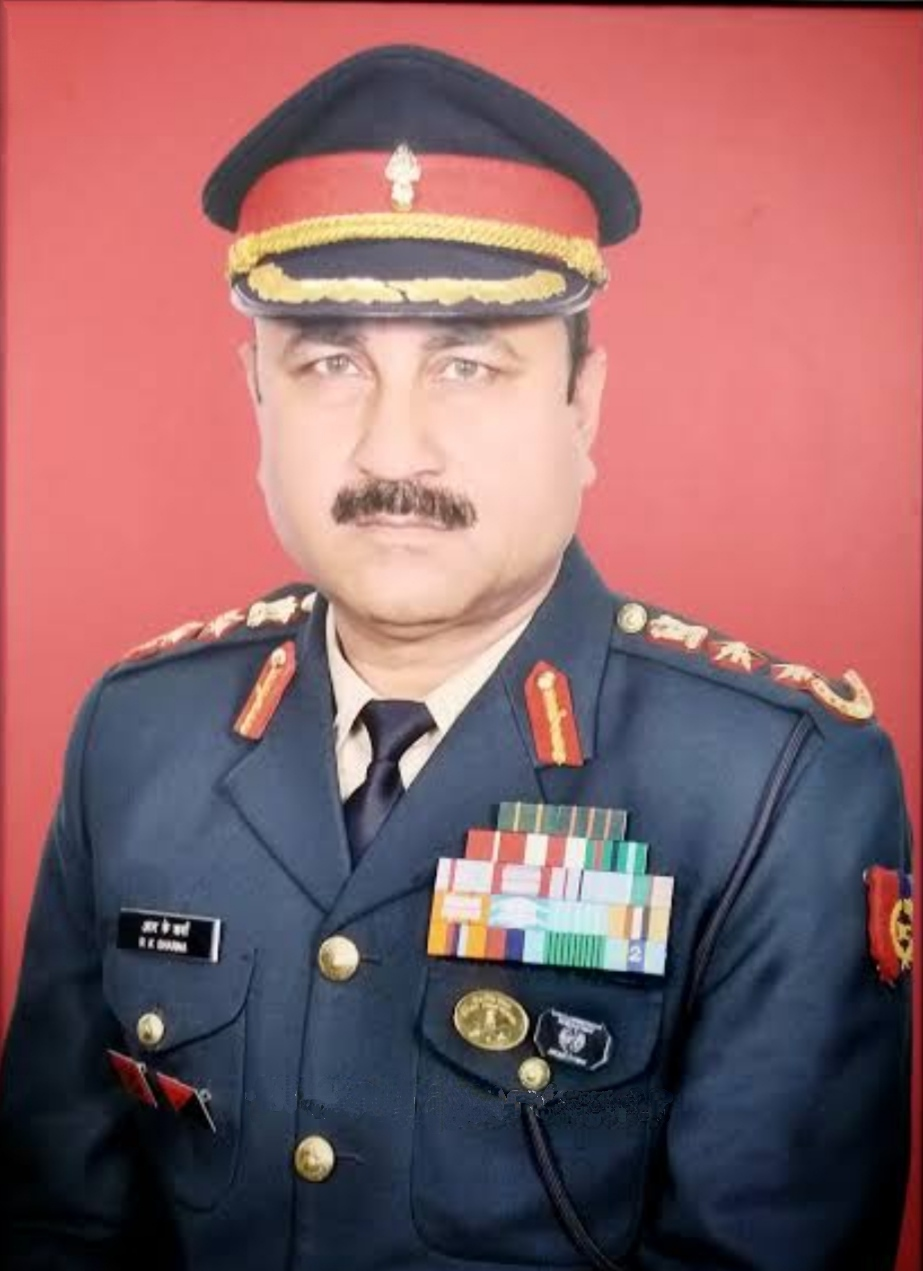
- Portrait of Col RK Sharma
- Born: 10 September 1965 (age 61); Jammu and Kashmir, India
- Military career
- Allegiance: India
- Branch: Indian Army
- Service years: 1985-2022
- Rank: Colonel
- Service number: SC-00137
- Units: 2 Brigade of the Guards; The Grenadiers; 32 Assam (on deputation)
- Commands: 2 Jammu and Kashmir Girls Battalion (NCC Jammu)
- Conflicts: Op-Vijay (Kargil War); Op-Rakshak; Op-Prakram; Op-Hifazat; Op-Bajrang
- Awards: Kirti Chakra; Shaurya Chakra; Sena Medal (Gallantry)

Colonel Rajinder Kumar Sharma, KC, SC, SM (born, 10 September 1965, also known as RK Sharma) is a retired decorated Indian Army officer of the Grenadiers. He is one of the few recipients of both Kirti Chakra and Shaurya Chakra for his exemplary bravery.

== Early life ==
Rajinder Kumar Sharma was born in Jammu and Kashmir. His family were refugee who came from POK after partition of India. His father was a policeman in Jammu and Kashmir Police and his uncle was in the army with Regiment of Artillery (India). He was motivated by his uncle since childhood so he was keen to join the army. After completing matriculation in 1983, he started preparation for army. He joined Indian Army as Sepoy in 1986 in 2 Brigade of the Guards. He later received a Short Service Commission through Special Service Commission entry and was commissioned into The Grenadiers in 1999 as a Lieutenant.

== Military career ==
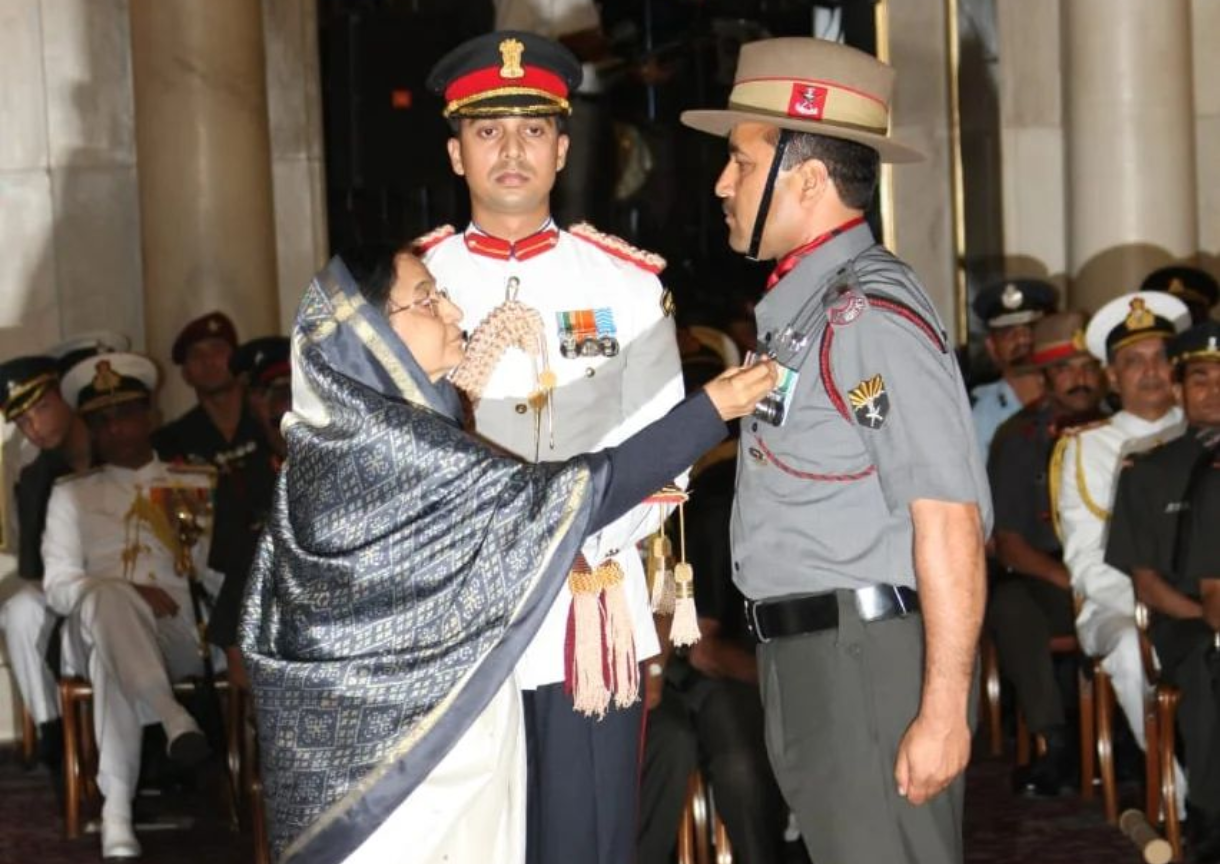
Major RK Sharma receiving gallantry award from the then Honorable President of India Srimati Pratibha Devisingh Patil

.

RK Sharma is one of the most decorated officers of the Indian Army. He is known for his courageous actions, bravery and exceptional leadership. He has been part of more than 300 operations in his 37 years of military service.

COAS Commendation

In 1993 during an encounter with terrorists, Lance Naik Sharma was struck by terrorist gunfire. In spite of his wounds, he and his team member eliminated 3 hardcore terrorists. For his bravery during the mission, he was awarded the COAS Commendation

Bar to COAS Commendation

During Operation Vijay in 1999, he and his team had captured Point 5465, located at 17,000 ft in the Batalik Sector. Later that post was renamed as 'Rajinder Post' in his name.

Sena Medal

On Republic Day, 2010, Major Sharma was awarded Sena Medal for successfully eliminating two terrorists.

Kirti Chakra

On Republic Day, 2008, Major Sharma was awarded the Kirti Chakra, India's second highest peacetime gallantry award, for his heroic action on 6 October 2007.

Shaurya Chakra

On Independence Day, 2009 Major Sharma was awarded the Shaurya Chakra, India's third highest peacetime gallantry award, for his bravery in Manipur on 7 June 2008. He was posted with 32 Assam Rifles at the time of the operation.

== Awards and decorations ==
	Kirti Chakra	Shaurya Chakra	
Sena Medal	Wound Medal	Samanya Seva Medal	Operation Vijay Star
Special Service Medal	Operation Vijay Medal	Operation Parakram Medal	Sainya Seva Medal
High Altitude Medal	Videsh Seva Medal	75th Independence Anniversary Medal	50th Independence Anniversary Medal
30 Years Long Service Medal	20 Years Long Service Medal	9 Years Long Service Medal	UNMEE Medal
