= Naga Regiment =

Regiment of the Indian Army

- Regimental Insignia of the Naga Regiment
- Active: 1970–present
- Country: India
- Branch: Indian Army
- Type: Line Infantry
- Role: Infantry
- Size: 3 battalions
- Regimental Centre: Ranikhet, Uttarakhand, India
- Nickname: The Head Hunters
- War Cry: Jai Durga Naga (Hail Durga Naga)
- Decorations: 1 Maha Vir Chakra, 4 Vir Chakras, 1 Yudh Seva Medal, 1 Vishisht Seva Medal, 48 Sena Medal,1 Kirti Chakra, 6 Shaurya Chakra

Commanders
- Colonel of the Regiment: Lt Gen Ram Chander Tiwari

Insignia
- Regimental Insignia: A pair of crossed Naga spears and a dao (a cutting weapon used in Nagaland), with a shield bearing a mithun (bull) head.

The Naga Regiment is an infantry regiment of the Indian Army. It is among the youngest regiments of the Indian Army - the first battalion was raised in Ranikhet, Uttarakhand in 1970. The regiment recruits mainly from Nagaland, in northeast India.

== History ==
=== Formation ===
The first battalion of the regiment (1 Naga) was raised at the Kumaon Regimental Centre, Ranikhet on 1 November 1970 under the command of Lieutenant Colonel. R.N. Mahajan, VSM. Being the only battalion, it was then designated as the Naga Regiment. The manpower to raise this battalion was provided by battalions of the Kumaon Regiment, Garhwal Rifles and 3 Gorkha Rifles. 69 Nagas were enrolled directly from rehabilitation camps of underground Nagas. However, the regiment's troops were to be 50% Nagas and 50% of an equal number of Kumaonis, Garhwalis and Gorkhas. Since many Kumaon battalions had been associated with Nagaland, particularly in the years preceding the raising of the Naga Regiment, it was affiliated to the Kumaon Regiment for all regimental matters. The second battalion (2 Naga) was raised on 11 February 1985 at Haldwani and the third battalion (3 Naga) was raised on 1 October 2009 at Haldwani.

=== Regimental heraldry ===
The traditional Naga weapons viz the Dao, the Spear and the prestigious Mithun have been integrated into the Regimental Crest. The regiment's colours are gold, green and red - the gold signifies the rising sun, the green signifies the infantry and red is the colour of authority among Nagas. The motto of the regiment is Parakramo vijayate (Valour triumphs) and the battle cry is Jai Durga Naga (Victory to Durga Naga).

== Operations ==
=== Operation Romeo ===
The 2nd battalion of the regiment (2 Naga) was inducted into Keran sector of Kupwara district, Jammu and Kashmir, where it was responsible for ensuring the sanctity of approximately 24 kilometres of Line of Control (LoC) and also to counter anti-national elements and their operations. It was in this sector that 2 Naga participated in one of the landmark operations - Operation Romeo. The goal of this operation was to dominate the LoC. The entire operation was carried out with clockwork precision and without any casualties to Indian troops.

=== Indo-Pakistani War of 1971 ===
The 1st battalion (1 Naga) took part in operations in East Pakistan under 4 Infantry Division, which was part of 2 Corps. It earned a name for the regiment and was awarded one Vir Chakra and three Sena Medals.

=== UN Mission ===
2 Naga has been deployed on the United Nations Mission in Sudan in 2008 and was awarded with UN Force Commander's Appreciation Card.

=== Kargil War ===
1 Naga reached Dras on 11 May 1999. In the attack on Tololing, it supported 2 Rajputana Rifles. After the capture of Tololing 1 Naga was assigned to capture the hill feature of Black Tooth, which is successfully did. In July 1999, the regiment captured the formations Pimple and Point 5060. 2 Naga was deployed as part of Operation Vijay in order to push back Pakistani infiltrators who had crossed the LoC in Kargil, Jammu and Kashmir. It was one of the first units to be inducted into the theatre of conflict. An assault group from 2 Naga attacked and destroyed a heavily guarded Pakistani mortar position and ammunition dump on Twin Bump in the Point 4875 complex, an action for which Sepoy Imliakum Ao was awarded the Maha Vir Chakra. 2 Naga also took part in the assault on Tiger Hill, where it attacked the mountain from its left flank. For their conspicuous acts of raw courage the units (1 Naga & 2 Naga) were both awarded the Theatre Honour 'KARGIL' and the Battle Honours of 'DRAS' and 'MUSHKOH' respectively.

=== ZAPAD 2021 ===
3rd Battalion, the Naga Regiment represented India and Indian military in the Multilateral Joint Strategic Exercise ZAPAD 2021 which was held at Russia.

== Issues ==
Although two battalions of the Naga Regiment were raised as per the historic 16-point 1960 agreement that facilitated the formation of Nagaland state, as of 2001 there were complaints that there was no proper representation of Naga youths in the regiment, headquartered at Ranikhet in Uttarakhand. Nagaland comes under dispensation category and the education standard required for soldier general duty (GD) category is only class-V standard for tribal candidates.

The Army then conducted a special recruitment drive for all category of posts to recruit 325 Naga youths across the state. GOC Nagaland, Major General R. N. Kapur, said at least 3,000 Naga youths would be recruited in the Army, Assam Rifles and reserve battalions in 2014 and hoped the youth would avail the opportunity to join the armed forces.

== Units ==
Battalion	Raising Date	Remarks	References
1st Battalion	1 November 1970	Nicknamed The Headhunters, raised at the Kumaon Regimental Centre, Ranikhet by Lieutenant Colonel (later Lieutenant General) RN Mahajan. Battle Honour Dras and Theatre Honour Kargil. Also awarded with three Army Commander Citations in 1999, 2013 and 2024. The most decorated of the three units.	
2nd Battalion	11 February 1985	Nicknamed Second to None Headhunters, raised at Haldwani by Lieutenant Colonel PS Sejwan. Two COAS Unit Citations, three Army Commanders Unit Citations and a Governor’s Plaque of Appreciation. Battle Honour Mushkoh and Theatre Honour Kargil	
3rd Battalion	1 October 2009	Raised at Haldwani. COAS Unit Citations in 2021 and 2026.	
Territorial Army Battalions			
164 Infantry Battalion (TA) (Home & Hearth)	1 November 2006	Nicknamed the Naga Terriers, located at Zakhama, Nagaland.	
Rashtriya Rifles			
60 Rashtirya Rifles			

== Decorations ==
President's Colour Award

1 Naga was presented with 'Colours' on 6 May 1978 at Dehradun by Shri Neelam Sanjiva Reddy, the President of India and 2 Naga was presented with 'Colours' on 10 May 1990 by General V.N. Sharma PVSM, ADC, the Chief of Army Staff. 3 Naga was presented with ‘Colours’ on 13 October 2023 in Ranikhet by General Manoj Pande PVSM, AVSM, VSM, ADC, the Chief of Army Staff.

Gallantry awards

- Maha Vir Chakra
  - Sepoy (later Subedar) Imliakum Ao, 2 Naga
- Kirti Chakra
  - Major David Manlun (posthumous), 1 Naga/164 Infantry Battalion (TA)
- Vir Chakra - 8
  - Hav (later Subedar Major/ Honorary Captain) Sangram Singh, 1 Naga
  - Havildar (later Subedar) Joseph Chang Anal, 2 Naga
  - Captain (now Brigadier) Deepankar Kapoor Singh Sharawat, 2 Naga
  - Lance Naik (later Subedar/ Honorary Captain) Khushiman Gurung, 1 Naga
  - Sepoy K Ashuli, 1 Naga (posthumous)
- Shaurya Chakra - 6
  - Major Samrat Maiti, 1 Naga (posthumous)
  - Sepoy (now Havildar) Vijay Singh Bohara, 60 RR/ 1 Naga
  - Lance Naik (now Naib Subedar) KS Khararwung, 1 Naga
  - Captain (now Colonel) Nayanjyoti Buragohain, 1 Naga
- Yudh Seva Medal
  - Colonel (later Brigadier) DK Badola, 2 Naga
- Vishisht Seva Medal
  - Brigadier Sameer Kalla, 2 Naga
  - Colonel (now Brigadier) Deepankar Kapoor Singh Sharawat, 2 Naga
  - Colonel Ramkrishanan Pillai Satyan
  - Colonel (later Brigadier) Arul Dennis, 1 Naga
  - Brigadier (now Major General) Sameer Srivastava, 1 Naga
  - Colonel Bimlesh Kumar, SM, 3 Naga
- Sena Medal - 48

== See also ==
- List of regiments of the Indian Army
