= Nectar Sanjenbam =

Recipient of Kirti Chakra and Shaurya Chakra

Colonel Nectar Sanjenbam KC, SC
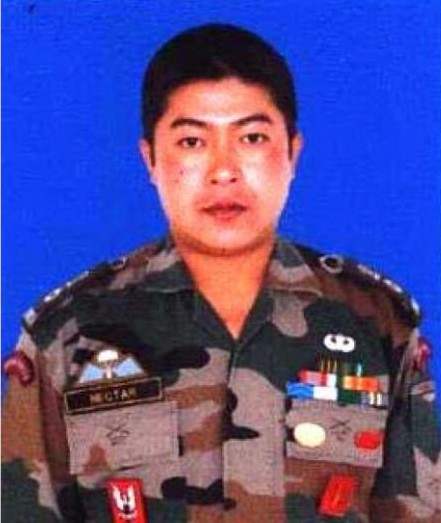
- Portrait of Col (then Lt Col) Sanjenbam
- Born: Manipur, India
- Alma mater: National Defence Academy
- Military career
- Allegiance: India
- Branch: Indian Army
- Rank: Colonel
- Service number: IC-61357M
- Unit: 21 PARA SF
- Commands: 21 PARA SF
- Awards: Kirti Chakra; Shaurya Chakra
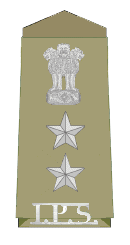
- Other work: SSP (Combat) (2023-2024) Manipur Police

Colonel Nectar Sanjenbam, KC, SC is a decorated retired Indian Army officer with the 21 PARA SF. He was also part of the Indian Army's counter-insurgency operation in Myanmar in 2015. He is one of the few recipients of both the Kirti Chakra and Shaurya Chakra award. He also served as Special Senior superintendent of police (Combat) in Manipur Police.

== Early life ==
Nectar Sanjenbam trained at the National Defence Academy. He was commissioned in the Maratha Light Infantry and later joined the 21 Para SF, the elite special forces unit in India.

== Awards ==
Shaurya Chakra

On Republic Day 2005, Captain Sanjenbam in Manipur was awarded the Shaurya Chakra, India's third highest peacetime gallantry award, for outstanding gallantry in an operation on 8 October 2004.

Kirti Chakra

On Independence Day 2015, Lieutenant Colonel Sanjenbam was awarded the Kirti Chakra, India's second highest peacetime gallantry award, for his gallantry on 9 June 2015 in Myanmar operation. Lt Col Nectar led his team in the most daring cross border operation in Myanmar and eliminated numerous insurgents.

== Later career ==
After his retirement from the army in 2023, as a colonel, he was appointed as a Special Senior Superintendent of Police (Combat) in Manipur Police by N Biren Singh Government during the violence in Manipur. He was relieved of his duties as per govt order on 19 Nov 2024.
