= David Manlun =

Indian Army Officer

Major David Manlun KC
- Hindi: डेविड मानलुन
- Born: 27 July 1985; Imphal, Manipur.
- Died: 7 June 2017 (aged 31); Lappa Area, Mon, Nagaland
- Education: Officers Training Academy, Chennai
- Military career
- Allegiance: India
- Branch: Indian Army
- Service years: 2010–2017
- Rank: Major
- Service number: SS-43887-Y
- Unit: First Naga Regiment
- Awards: Kirti Chakra

Major David Manlun, KC (27 July 1985 – 7 June 2017) was an Indian Army Officer who was posthumously awarded the Kirti Chakra, India's second highest peace-time military decoration. He was from the First Battalion The Naga Regiment.

Earlier, In August, 2016, he received the COAS Commendation Card for his extraordinary service.

== Early life and education ==
David was born on 27 July 1985, in Imphal, Manipur, to parents from the Churachandpur area of Manipur. His father's name is Subedar M Khamzalam (retd.) and mother's name is Nan Nuan Niang.

David had a passion for languages, and in addition to English, Hindi, and his native Zou, he was fluent in Mizo, Kuki, and Paite. David completed his 12th schooling from Army Public School, Shillong in 2003. He graduated from St. Anthony's College, Shillong in the year 2006.

== Military career ==
Manlun was commissioned in the Indian Army's 1st Battalion of Naga Regiment as a lieutenant in March 2010 from the Officers Training Academy, Chennai through UPSC Combined Defence Services Examination. He joined the battalion in J& K at Naugam and remained there for the following two years, actively participating in various operations.

He was commissioned into the 1st Battalion of the Naga Regiment, an infantry regiment famed for its brave troops, in March 2010. He joined the battalion in Jammu & Kashmir at Naugam and remained there for the following two years, participating in a number of missions.

Maj David was assigned to 164 Infantry Battalion (TA) Naga Regiment in Nagaland in 2014 after serving as a peacekeeper in Bakloh, Himachal Pradesh. On 15 August 2016, he received the Chief of Army Staff Commendation for his outstanding service. Maj David had opted for deputation to the National Security Guard after nearly completing his stint in Nagaland, and his probation was set to commence on 23 June 2017.

== Lappa Operation ==
The military forces agreed to undertake a joint operation on 6 June 2017 after obtaining information reports concerning the presence of militants in the Lappa area, close to the Myanmar border. The militants were suspected to be members of the United Liberal Front of Assam (ULFA–I) and S.S. Khaplang factions of the National Socialist Council of Nagaland (NSCN–K), which were active in Nagaland's Mon district.

A combined unit of the 12th Para (SF) Battalion and the Naga Regiment's 164 Infantry Battalion of the Territorial Army conducted a joint operation. In the Lappa area of Nagaland's Mon district, the combined crew leapt into action and conducted a search and destroy mission. The location was about 325 kilometres from Nagaland's capital, Kohima, and 25 kilometres from the Myanmar border. When the terrorists opened fire on the team, Maj David was in charge. Maj David commanded from the front and directed his troops as they counter-attacked. Before making the ultimate sacrifice, Major David Manlun had killed 4 Heavily armed ULFA terrorists. He was wounded and succumbed to his injuries during the intense gunfight. Inspired by his leadership, the team attacked the terrorists, and the successful operation resulted in the insurgents surrendering a large quantity of weaponry and ammunition.

== Kirti Chakra ==
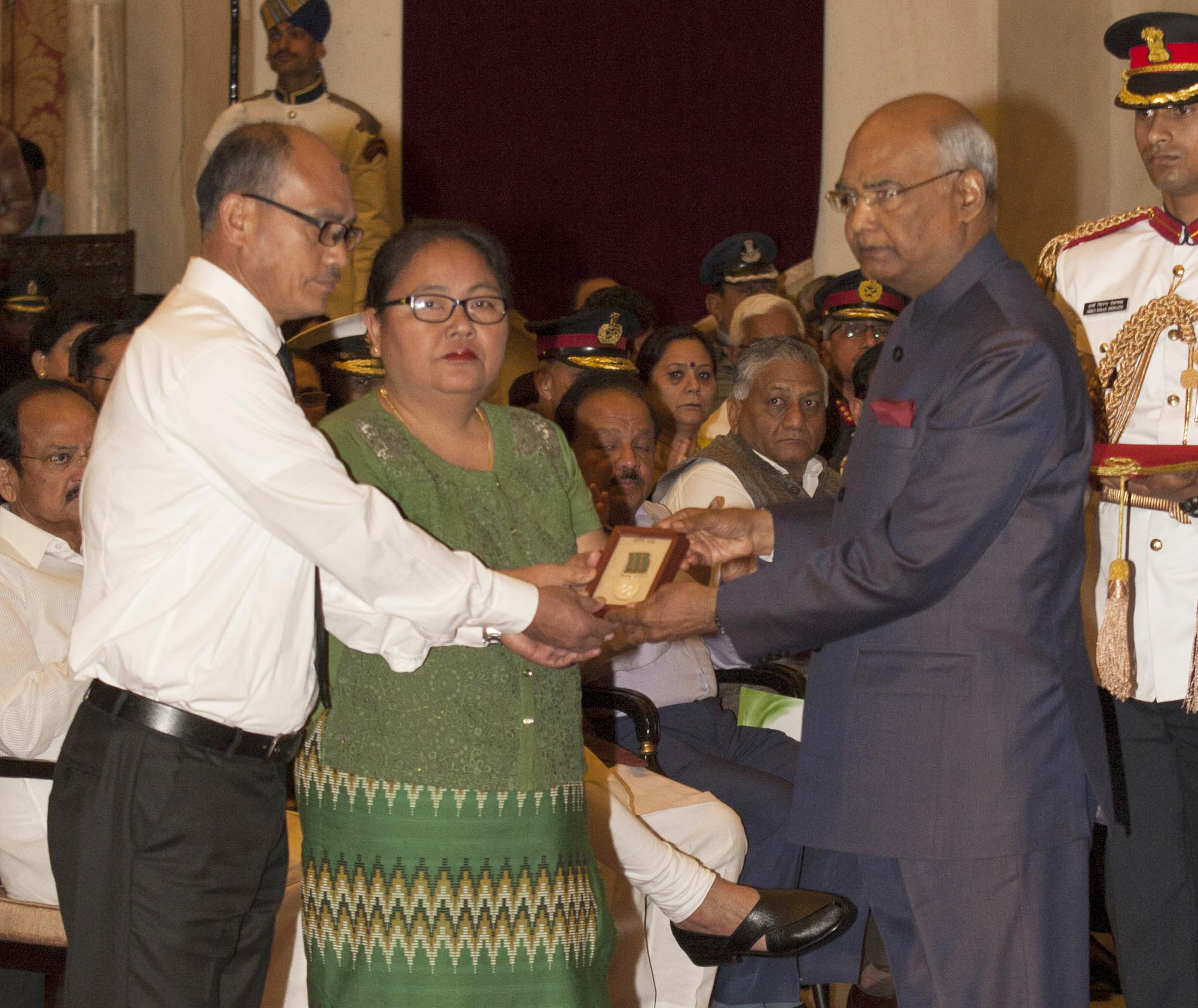
President R. N. Kovind presenting the Kirti Chakra (posthumous) to the parents of Major David Manlun, 164 Infantry Battalion (TA) (H&H) Naga Regiment.

David Manlun was awarded the Kirti Chakra, India's second highest peace-time military honour on 27 March 2018, at the Defence Investiture Ceremony–I, at Rashtrapati Bhavan, in New Delhi. His father Subedar M. Khamzalam (retd.) and mother Smt. Nan Nuan Niang received the honour for their deceased son from the President of India, R. N. Kovind.

CITATION

DAVID MANLUN

164 INFANTRY BATTALION (TA) (H&H) NAGA REGIMENT

Based on a specific intelligence developed by Major David Manlun, an operation was launched in Northern Nagaland in June 2017. During the said operation at around 2200 hrs, contact with a group of militants was established by the column Major David Manlun.

A fierce firefight ensued immediately, wherein the militants lobbed grenades towards the position of Major David Manlun injuring him and three other ranks. Despite bearing the brunt of militant’s fire and grenade blast Major David Manlun with utter disregard to his personal safety moved forward and opened fire from close range to pin down the militants, thus preventing them from causing further casualty to own troops and eliminated three militants. Major David Manlun succumbed to his injuries shortly thereafter. The killed militants were hardcore cadres of ULFA(I) and were involved in numerous incidents of violence in Upper Assam.

Major David Manlun displayed conspicuous personal bravery and leadership of the highest order and made supreme sacrifice in fighting with the militants.

— Gazette of India Notification,

== Legacy ==
- On 23 May 2018, Zonal president Rajinder Ahuja and Army Wives Welfare Association, opened the newly constructed auditorium of Army Public School (APS) Shillong, which was dedicated after Late Major David Manlun, Kirti Chakra.

== See also ==
- Kirti Chakra
- Naga Regiment
- List of Kirti Chakra award recipients
