= Sanjiv Kumar Thakur =

Indian Army Junior Officer

Subedar Sanjiv Kumar Thakur KC
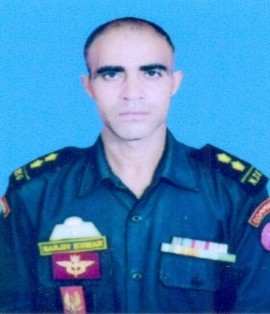
- Portrait of Sub Sanjiv Kumar Thakur (pictured as Assistant Commander Grade II during deputation at NSG)
- Born: 5 December 1977; Bilaspur, Himachal Pradesh, India l
- Died: 5 April 2020 (aged 42); Kupwara, Jammu and Kashmir, India
- Military career
- Allegiance: India
- Branch: Indian Army
- Service years: 1996–2020
- Rank: Subedar
- Service number: JC–413798Y
- Unit: 4 Para (SF)
- Awards: Kirti Chakra

Subedar Sanjiv Kumar Thakur KC (popularly known as Sanjiv Kumar) (5 December 1977 – 5 April 2020), was a Junior Commissioned Officer in the Indian Army with the 4 Para (SF). He led a team during Operation Randori Behak. For his leadership during the operation, he was posthumously awarded India's second highest peacetime gallantry award Kirti Chakra.

== Early life ==
Kumar was born on 5 December 1977 in Dehra village in a Rajput family in the Bilaspur district of Himachal Pradesh. Kumar completed his schooling from Dharamshala.

== Military career ==
Kumar enlisted in the Indian Army on 30 August 1996. During his service years, he served in various operational areas. He was also deputed with the National Security Guard (NSG).

=== Operation Randori Behak ===
By 1 April 2020, some hardcore terrorists entered LOC in the period of COVID 19 Pandemic, it was confirmed with the footprints on the snow ground. They were noticed by Drone surveillance system of Indian Army. 8 Jat Regiment also made a gunfight with them, but the terrorists were able to escape from the place. On 2 April, 41 and 57 Rashtriya Rifles too joined the Operation, but again they hid in the Jungles after an exchange of firing. After few days later, Army got their location by UAV Intelligence. A new operation was launched, which was named Operation Randori Behak. The team consisted of two squads with six soldiers each of para commandos. Subedar Kumar became one of the squad commander of the team. They were airdropped by Helicopter HAL Dhruv, as the place was full of snow and inaccessible. They began their search for the terrorists in the extreme weather condition. After searching for a while, Paratrooper Chhatrapal Singh and Paratrooper Bal Krishan were standing at the edge of a mountain precipice, which was an overhanging hardened snow mass. Under their weight, the edge broke and they fell into a frozen mountain stream. Sub Kumar along with his team immediately rushed to their rescue. The terrorists were hidden at the same place, where they had fallen. The terrorists became aware of this incident and started firing at Kumar's team. In the close combat, despite being wounded at several parts of body, Kumar's team was able to eliminate all of the terrorists. The operation was successful on 5 April 2020, but Kumar was killed in action. Kumar was posthumously awarded the nation's second highest peacetime gallantry award Kirti Chakra. Alongside four of his comrades Havildar Devendra Singh, Paratrooper Bal Krishan, Paratrooper Chattarpal Singh, Paratrooper Amit Kumar were killed in action, only Paratrooper Tamang, Shaurya Chakra was the sole survivor of this operation.

== Kirti Chakra citation ==
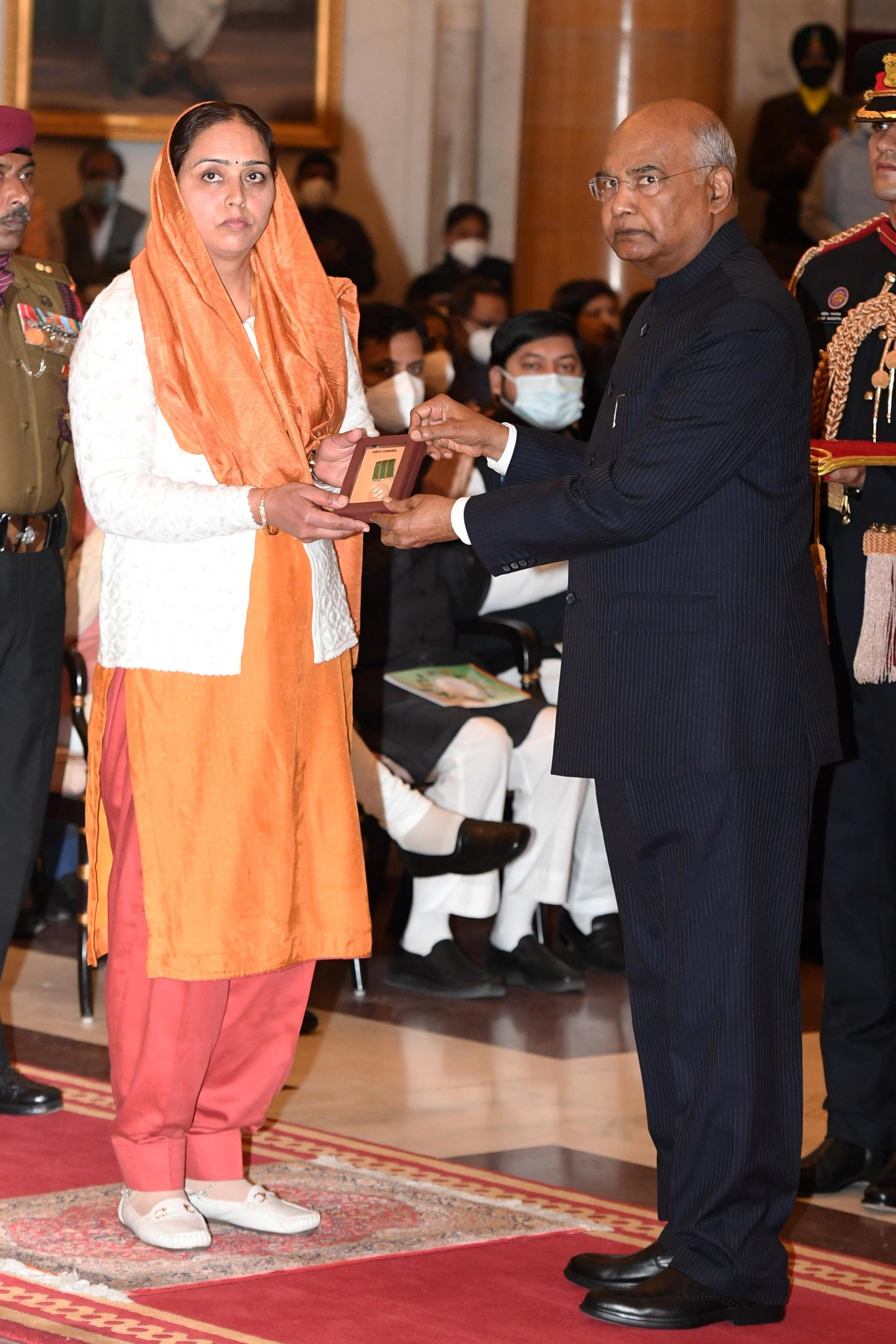
Subedar Sanjiv Kumar’s wife receiving the Kirti Chakra from Shri Ram Nath Kovind, President of India at the Rashtrapati Bhawan on 23 November 2021.

The President of India presented the Kirti Chakra to Subedar Sanjiv Kumar on 22 November 2021, in recognition of his supreme sacrifices and leadership, which was received by his wife.
