= Shashank Tiwari =

Indian army officer

Lieutenant Shashank Tiwari KC
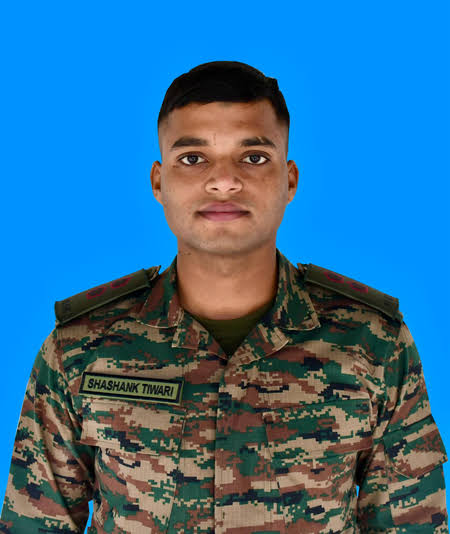
- Born: 24 January 2002; Faizabad, Uttar Pradesh, India
- Died: 22 May 2025 (aged 23); North Sikkim, Sikkim
- Alma mater: National Defence Academy; Indian Military Academy
- Military career
- Allegiance: Republic of India
- Branch: Indian Army
- Service years: 2024–2025
- Rank: Lieutenant
- Units: 1 Sikkim Scouts(attached); ASC
- Awards: Kirti Chakra

Lieutenant Shashank Tiwari KC (24 January 2002 – 22 May 2025) was an Indian Army officer. He was posthumously awarded the Kirti Chakra, India's second highest peacetime military decoration for saving a drowning soldier by sacrificing his life.

== Early life and education ==
Tiwari was born on 24 January 2002 in Ayodhya, Uttar Pradesh, to Shri Jang Bahadur Tiwari and Smt Neeta Tiwari.

== Military career ==
He was selected for both, the 145th and 146th Course of the National Defence Academy, eventually joining the former. After successfully completing his military training at the Indian Military Academy, he was commissioned into the Army Service Corps on 14 December 2024 as a Lieutenant. In 2025, he was attached to the 1st Battalion of the Sikkim Scouts Regiment for operational exposure and regimental attachment.

== North Sikkim operation ==
During 2025, Tiwari's unit was deployed in the high-altitude region of North Sikkim which borders with the China. The unit's Area of Responsibility encompassed vast expanses of rugged mountains and treacherous valleys, most of which remained snowbound for the greater part of the year. The extreme climatic conditions posed continuous operational challenges like blocking vital routes, hampering troop movement and supplying convoys. Maintaining road connectivity between the forward posts was, therefore, a mission-critical task, requiring regular patrolling and snow clearance operations under extremely hazardous conditions. On 22 May 2025, Tiwari was leading one such Route Opening Patrol and snow clearance operation from Bichhu to the Tactical Operating Base at Chu Junction. While crossing a bridge over a fast-flowing mountain stream, Agniveer Stephan Subba lost his footing and was swept into the river. Without thinking twice, Lieutenant Tiwari jumped into the freezing stream to save his comrade. Naik Pukar Katel immediately jumped to join Tiwari. They however managed to pull Agniveer Subba to safety. Yet, amidst turbulent flow of the mountain stream, Lieutenant Tiwari was swept away downstream. Despite the team's desperate attempts to reach him, the force of the water carried him away. After this a massive search operation was launched. Later Tiwari's body was recovered approximately 800 meters downstream of the river. For the bravery, camaraderie and sacrifice his life for his comrades, Lieutenant Shashank Tiwari was posthumously awarded India's second highest gallantry award the Kirti Chakra.
