= Dilwar Khan (soldier) =

Indian Army soldier and Kirti Chakra awardee

Naik Dilwar Khan KC
- Born: March, 1996; Una District, Himachal Pradesh, India
- Died: 23 July 2024; Lolab Valley, Kupwara district, Jammu and Kashmir, India
- Military career
- Allegiance: India
- Branch: Indian Army
- Service years: 2014-2024
- Rank: Naik
- Service number: 15240290F
- Units: Regiment of Artillery; 28 RR
- Conflicts: Counter-insurgency operations in Jammu and Kashmir
- Awards: Kirti Chakra (Posthumous)

Dilwar Khan, KC was a soldier of the Indian Army who served in the 28 Rashtriya Rifles, a counter-insurgency unit deployed in Jammu and Kashmir. He was posthumously awarded the Kirti Chakra, India's second-highest peacetime gallantry award, for his bravery during an anti-terrorist operation in Kupwara district in July 2024.

== Early life and education ==
Khan born in March, 1996 and was from Gharwasda village in Bangana tehsil of Una district, Himachal Pradesh. Shri Karamdeen and Smt Bholan Bibi were his parents. He joined the Regiment of Artillery in Indian Army on 20 December 2014.

== Military service ==
Dilwar Khan served in the Regiment of Artillery of the Indian Army. He was later deployed with the 28 Rashtriya Rifles, which conducts counter-insurgency operations in the Kashmir Valley.

== Kupwara operation ==
On 23 July 2024, Naik Dilwar Khan was part of an ambush team conducting a counter-terrorism operation in the dense forests of Lolab Valley in Kupwara district, Jammu and Kashmir. During the operation, the team encountered heavily armed militants. One of the militants approached close to the ambush position. Despite intense firing, Khan moved forward to engage the militant at close range. During the encounter he sustained serious injuries but continued the fight and successfully neutralised the terrorist before succumbing to his injuries.

== Kirti Chakra ==
For displaying exceptional courage and devotion to duty beyond the call of duty, Naik Dilwar Khan was posthumously awarded the Kirti Chakra on the eve of Republic Day in 2025.

== See also ==
- Kirti Chakra
- Rashtriya Rifles
- Indian Army
