= Dev Raj Singh Thakur =

Recipient of the Kirti Chakra award

Warrant Officer Dev Raj Singh Thakur KC
- Allegiance: India
- Branch: Indian Air Force
- Rank: Warrant Officer
- Awards: Kirti Chakra

Sergeant Dev Raj Singh Thakur, KC (died May 1987), was a sergeant working in Indian Air Force. He received national prominence for chasing and apprehending Nathuram Godse.

He was awarded the Kirti Chakra, a gallantry award, in 1952 for arresting Godse by Dr Rajendra Prasad contemporaneous President of India and he was promoted to the rank of Warrant Officer. He is in news posthumously, for his family demanding a government job for a kin of gallantry award winner as there is no breadwinner in the family.

== Personal details ==
He had three sons and one daughter. While in service in the Indian Air Force, he lost his mental balance and was subsequently sent on retirement. He remained in a mental health facility for 14 years in Amritsar. The causes of his loss of mental balance are not known, but it is possibly due to his act of apprehending Nathuram Godse. Godse was the person who killed Mohandas Gandhi. He received a monthly pension from the Indian government until he died in May 1987.

== Awards ==
- Ashok Chakra Award (Class II) in 1952.
