= Ivan Joseph Crasto =

Indian army officer

Colonel Ivan Joseph Crasto KC
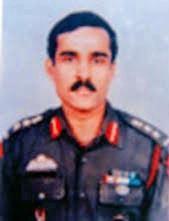
- Portrait of Colonel Ivan Joseph Crasto
- Born: Goa, India
- Education: National Defence Academy; Indian Military Academy
- Military career
- Allegiance: India
- Branch: Indian Army
- Service years: 1978-??
- Rank: Colonel
- Service number: IC-35129
- Unit: 1 PARA (SF)
- Commands: 1 PARA (SF)
- Known for: Timber Trail cable car rescue
- Awards: Kirti Chakra

Colonel Ivan Joseph Crasto, KC is a retired officer of the Indian Army with the elite Para SF. During a daring civilian rescue mission known as the Timber Trail Rescue in 1992, he was awarded India's second highest peacetime gallantry award the Kirti Chakra for his indomitable courage to save the civilian from cable car.

== Early life and education ==
Crasto was born in Goa to a naval officer. His spent his childhood in Mount Abu. He dreamed of being a lawyer, but his father coerced him to join NDA in the footsteps of his elder brother.

== Military career ==
Crasto was one of the first gentleman cadets among four others to do para jumping at Indian Military Academy. Joseph Crasto was commissioned into the Para SF in Indian Army in July 1978. He held key command and operational roles, eventually leading the 21st Battalion, Parachute Regiment (Special Forces).

Timber Trail Rescue (1992)

In October 1992, a cable car at Timber Trail, Parwanoo, Himachal Pradesh became stranded mid-air with 10 passengers trapped inside due to a mechanical failure. Major Crasto led a team in a high-risk rescue operation. Despite turbulent winds and dangerous conditions, Crasto's leadership was crucial in saving the lives of the stranded civilians. For his “remarkable courage and leadership,” he was awarded the Kirti Chakra, one of India's peacetime gallantry awards.

== Kirti Chakra ==
The Kirti Chakra citation on the Gallantry awards government of India Website reads as follows:

CITATION

MAJOR IVAN JOSEPH CRASTO
PARA (SF) (IC-35129)
(Effective date of the award: 14 October 1992)

"On 13th October, 1992 at 1930 hours, Commanding Officer, Para (Commando) was informed that the haulage cable in a cable car system at Timber Trail, Parwanoo, Himachal Pradesh had snapped at 1530 hours leaving 10 tourists stranded in the cable car which was precariously hanging 1300 feet above the ground. The Commanding Officer was asked to move to the site" and "he prepared to launch a special rescue mission. A team of five men was selected for the rescue operation under the leadership of Major Ivan Joseph Crasto, an expert in heliborne operations and experienced combat free faller. In the morning, Major Ivan Joseph Crasto was taken up for an aerial recce in a Chetak Helicopter. Several attempts to close on to the cable car proved unsuccessful due to turbulent winds and the Helicopter was forced to return. By 1630 hours, with the chances of heliborne rescue getting remote, the last attempt in an MI-17 Helicopter was made, Major Ivan Joseph was strapped to a winch and made attempts to a land on the narrow greasy top of the cable car. After four determined efforts he finally managed to land on the greasy top of the cable car. The cable car all this while was swinging like a pendulum 1300 feet above the ground. Again displaying cool professionalism ho undid the hatch with alacrity and single handedly hauled up the first st passenger who was then winched up. He preferred spending the entire night in the cable car in order to boost the morale of and restore hope in the remaining tourists. The spirit, determination and courage of the officer inspired the entire joint team and on the morning of 15th October, 1992, in repeated flawless mission, witnessed by thousands. Major Ivan Joseph Crasto sont up all 18 passengers one by one displaying great skill and professionalism and undertaking lot of risk as one mistake in the movement of a passenger could endanger the lives of the passengers as well as those engaged in the rescue operation. He saved the lives of ten passengers in a venture fraught with grave risk and danger to life and thought to be impossible of execution. Major Ivan Joseph Crasto, thus, displayed conspicuous bravery, courage and determination of an exceptional order."

== Rank and later life ==
Crasto rose to the rank of Colonel before retiring from the Indian Army. After retirement, he settled in Australia as a Maths Teacher at St John Paul II Catholic College.
