= Pradeep Tathawade =

Recipient of the Kirti Chakra award

Major Pradeep R Tathawade KC
- Born: 21 Sep 1963; Kendur Pabal village, Shirur Taluka, Pune district, Maharashtra, India
- Died: 17 June 2000; Poonch district, Jammu and Kashmir, India
- Military career
- Branch: Indian Army
- Service years: 1984-2000
- Rank: Major
- Service number: IC-41913
- Unit: 8 Jammu and Kashmir Light Infantry
- Awards: Kirti Chakra

Major Pradeep Tathawade, KC was an officer in the Jammu and Kashmir Light Infantry regiment of the Indian Army who fought terrorist in Poonch district of Kashmir in June 2000. He was posthumously awarded the Kirti Chakra in October 2001.
