= Anuj Sood =

Indian Army Officer (1989–2020)

Major Anuj Sood SC
- Hindi: अनुज सूड
- Born: 17 December 1989; Kangra, Himachal Pradesh
- Died: 2 May 2020 (aged 30); Handwara, Kupwara, Jammu and Kashmir
- Education: National Defence Academy, Khadakwasla; Indian Military Academy, Dehradun
- Spouse: Aakriti Singh Sood
- Relatives: Brigadier Chandrakant Sood (father)
- Military career
- Allegiance: India
- Branch: Indian Army
- Service years: 2012–2020
- Rank: Major
- Service number: IC–76429H
- Units: 19 Brigade of the Guards; 21 Rashtriya Rifles
- Awards: Shaurya Chakra

Major Anuj Sood, SC (17 Dec 1989 – 2 May 2020) was an Indian Army Officer who received the Shaurya Chakra posthumously. He was a member of the 19th Battalion, Brigade of Guards and 21st Rashtriya Rifles Battalion. He was martyred in action while serving with the latter in Handwara, Jammu and Kashmir.

== Early life and education ==
Sood was born in the Kangra district of Himachal Pradesh. Later relocated to Chandigarh. He was born on 17 December 1989, in Air Force Command Hospital Bengaluru, to Brigadier Chandrakant Sood (retd.) and Smt Ragini Sood. He did his schooling from Army Public School, Udhampur, T-Morh, Jammu and Kashmir, and after that from Punjab Public School, Nabha. In 2008, having cleared AIEEE, he met all eligibility criteria for joining the Indian Institute of Technology (IIT), but chose the National Defence Academy instead. From his childhood, he aspired to follow in the footsteps of his father, who served in the Indian Army Corps of Electronics and Mechanical Engineers.

== Military career ==
Sood was commissioned from the Indian Military Academy, Dehradun on 9 June 2012. After completing his training as a young Lieutenant, he handled regimental duties such as Adjutant and Platoon Commander, before being appointed as Aide-de-camp to General Officer Commanding 14 RAPID for a period of 13 months. He then went on to complete the Junior Command Courses at Army War College, Mhow, where he excelled. Sood later married Akriti Sood. Akriti Sood is a software engineer and daughter of a Navy Marine Commando. On 4 March 2018, Sood was assigned to the 21 Rashtriya Rifles (Guards).

== Shaurya Chakra ==
=== Citation ===
Sood was awarded the nation's third highest peacetime gallantry award 'Shaurya Chakra' on 26 January 2021 for his supreme sacrifice during Operation Chanjimula. Major Anuj Sood's Shaurya Chakra Citation is as follows:

CITATION

MAJOR ANUJ SOOD

21 RASHTRIYA RIFLES (BRIGADE OF GUARDS)

Major Anuj Sood was leading the men of his Company during `Operation Chanjimula' on 02 May 2020. During the operation the officer laid the cordon at the suspected house with his Combat Action Team. Unmindful of his personal safety he along with the Commanding Officer and three other individuals moved inside the house to evacuate the civilians trapped inside and being taken as hostages by the terrorists. The Gallant officer in the ensuing fire fight with the terrorists showcased utmost grid, valour and bravery and made the supreme sacrifice by laying down his life in the finest traditions of the Indian Army and injured the terrorists with nefarious designs.

— Gazette of India Notification,
