= Army Service Corps (India) =

Logistics support arm of the Indian Army

- Crest of Army Service Corps
- Active: 8 December 1760–Present
- Country: United Kingdom; India
- Allegiance: British India (1760–1947); India (1947–Present)
- Branch: British Indian Army; Indian Army
- Role: Military Logistics
- Regimental Centre: Bengaluru, Karnataka
- Motto: Seva Asmākam Dharma (transl. Service is our creed)
- Anniversaries: December 8 (Corps Raising Day)
- Engagements: First World War; Second World War; Second Sino-Japanese War; Sino-Indian War of 1962; Indo-Pakistani War of 1947; Indo-Pakistani War of 1965; Indo-Pakistani War of 1971; Indo-Pakistani War of 1999
- Decorations: See below

Commanders
- Director General Supplies and Transport: Lieutenant General Mukesh Chadha, AVSM SM VSM
- Colonel Commandants: Lt Gen Mukesh Chadha, AVSM SM VSM DGST & Senior Colonel Commandant; Lt Gen Ajay Ramdev, SM; Lt Gen Harsh Chhiber, AVSM VSM

Insignia
- Regimental Colors: Navy Blue; Yellow; White
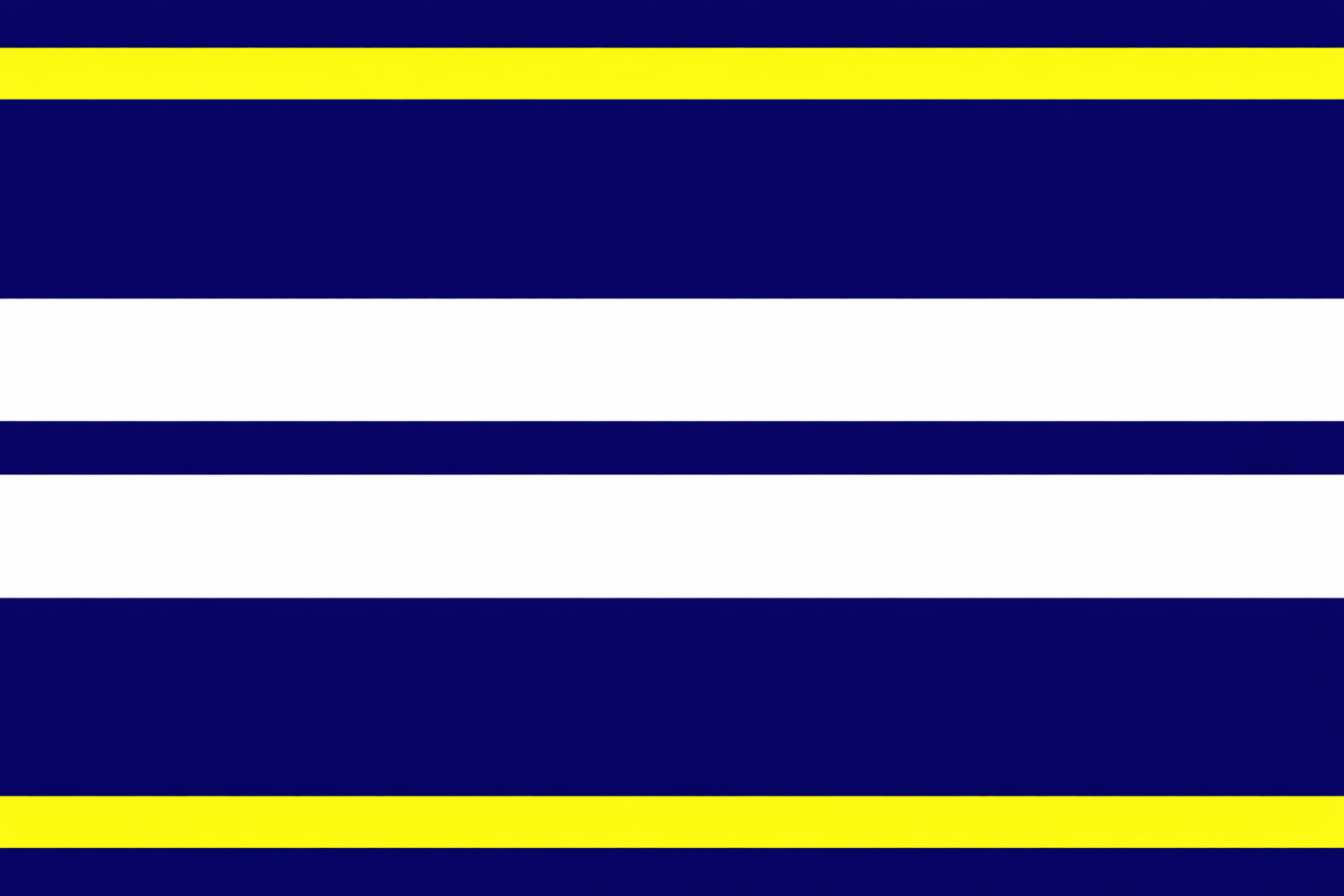
- Regimental Flag

The Army Service Corps (ASC) is an administrative corps and an arm of the Indian Army which handles its logistic support. It is the oldest and the largest administrative service in the Indian Army. While the history of supply and transport services is as old as the history of organized warfare itself it was in 1760 that the very rudimentary supply and transport organizations of the three presidencies of the East India Company were brought under the council of a single authority.

== History ==
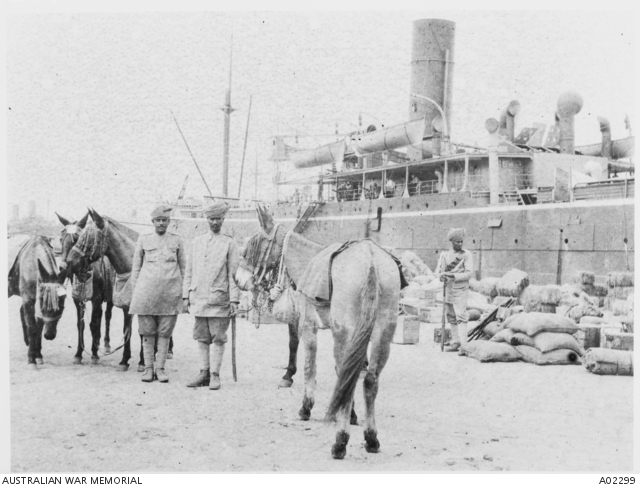
Indian Mule Corps in Alexandria about to embark for Gallipoli, c. 1915

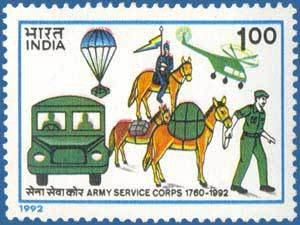
1992 postal stamp

=== Pre Independence ===
The origin of the corps go back to 1760 when a Commissariat used to exist in the administrative component of the armies three Presidencies of Bengal, Madras and Bombay. In 1878 the separate Commissariats were amalgamated into a single entity and then in 1901 it was renamed the Supply and Transport Corps. During the First World War the corps became a permanent component of the British Indian Army and was renamed the Indian Army Service Corps in 1923. In 1935 the corps was granted the 'Royal' prefix and became known as Royal Indian Army Service Corps (RIASC). During the 2nd World War, the Corps once again demonstrated its tremendous capacity to persevere, adapt and evolve in the face of adversity. Its numbers swelled exponentially in Mechanical Transport, Animal Transport and Supply Units. The kind of expansion the Corps went through during the years of war, can be assessed from the fact that when the war ended, one sixth of the Indian Army was wearing Royal Indian Army Service Corps’ shoulder titles. Some units served in France during the Second World War and were evacuated at Dunkirk.

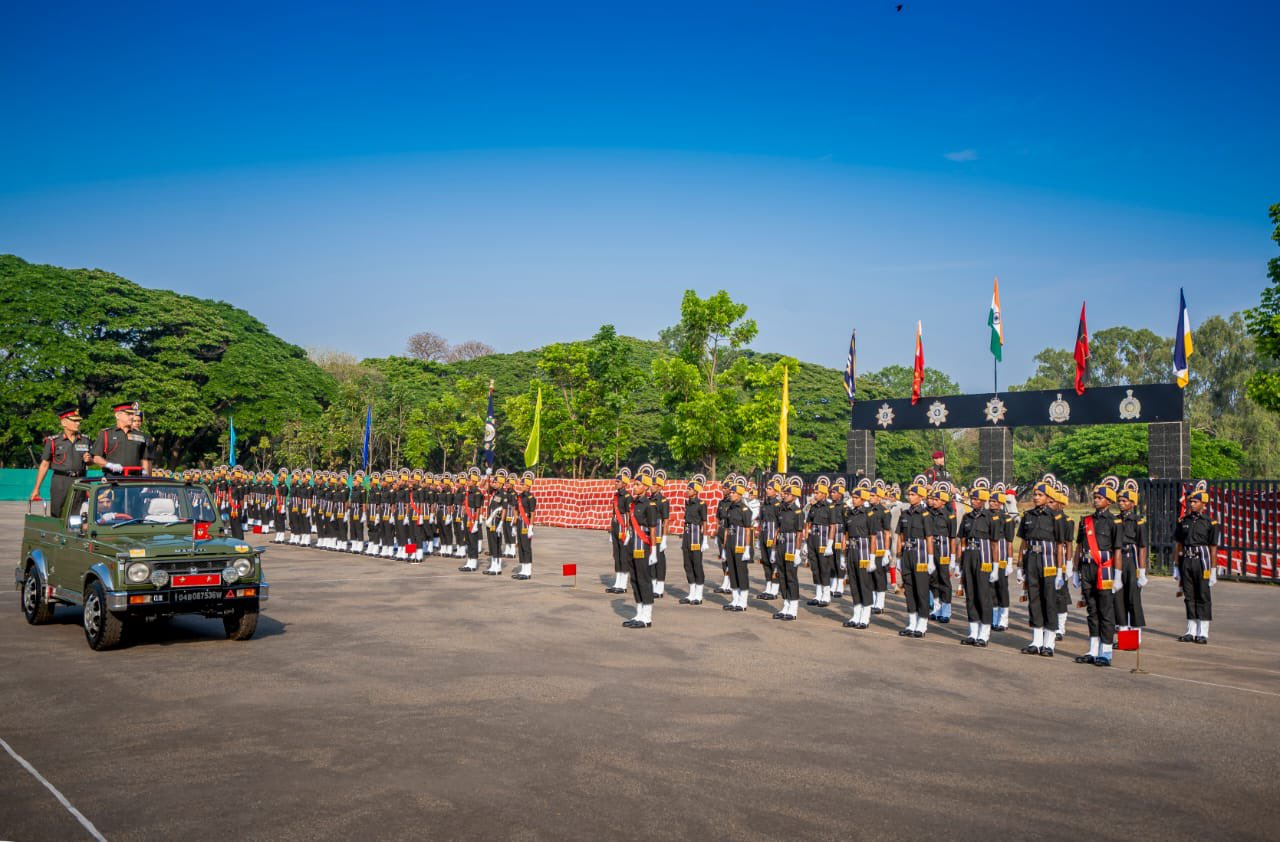
Passing out parade, Army Service Corps Centre, Bengaluru

=== Post Independence ===
After India gained independence in 1947, the corps underwent further expansion and by 1948 Indian Catering Corps and Indian Army Corps of Clerks were amalgamated into the corps. The Food Testing Laboratories were also placed under the control of RIASC. On 26 January 1950, after India became a republic, the corps dropped the use of the 'Royal' prefix and became the Army Service Corps. On 08 Dec 1950, the President of India accorded sanction to the Corps to use the National Emblem in the Army Service Corps Badge and wear the Red Lanyard on the right shoulder, as recognition of its services. The first Corps Day was celebrated on 08 Dec 1952 and it has remained their Corps Day ever since. The new Corps Colours were presented by the then President of India Dr. Zakir Husain to the Corps on 8 December 1967 on the 207th Corps Anniversary at ASC Centre (South), Bangalore. Lt SSK Raheja had the rare and enviable privilege and honour of being selected as the Colour Ensign, he received the Corps Colours from the President. The second regimental Colours were presented on the occasion of Third Reunion by Gen OP Malhotra, COAS on 8 December 1979. In Oct 1975 the Corps song entitled 'Seva Corps Ke Jawan' was composed and recorded on a 45 RPM disc by HMV. The Corps song depicts in simple language the various facets of the Corps.

Since Independence, the ASC has taken part in operations in Kashmir, Nagaland, against the Chinese in Ladakh and NEFA in 1962 and against Pakistan in 1965 and 1971. The ASC has also been deeply involved with logistics for various low intensity conflict operations and counter insurgency operations. It took part in Indian Peace Keeping Force operations (IPKF) in Sri Lanka. During OP VIJAY, the Corps provided logistic support in the difficult terrains of Kargil. 874 AT Battalion got unit citation in OP VIJAY for there exemplary services.

=== The Corps Emblem and Motto ===
The Corps emblem consists of the Ashoka Emblem at the top, the Ashoka Chakra in the center, a circular band encircling the Chakra, a laurel wreath and a scroll carrying the motto 'Seva Asmakam Dharma' . In 1950, the corps officially adopted Seva Asmakam Dharma meaning Service is our creed as its motto.

== Role ==
The ASC is mainly responsible for the provisioning, procurement and distribution of Supplies of food ration, fresh & dry edible items, FOL(Fuels, oil, lubricants), Hygiene Chemicals and items of Hospital Comforts to Army, Air Force and when required for Navy and other para military forces. The operation of Mechanical Transport except first line transport and fighting vehicles and the provision and operation of first and second line Animal Transport is also the responsibility of the ASC. The other responsibilities include carriage and distribution of ammunition including mines, forward of the Corps Maintenance Area in the field in case of plains, and forward of Divisional Maintenance Area in case of mountain formation, packing of commodities for supply, loading of aircraft and ejection of loads, training and provisioning of clerks for all branches of staff at formation headquarters and the training and provisioning of catering staff in the army. This Corps is a versatile one designed for the role with wide parameters for multifarious activities of immediate concern to the troops. The Corps also handle postal services in forward areas.

== Adventure activities ==
The Corps is renowned for its esprit-de-corps, dare-devilry and spirit of adventure. The rider team of the Corps, popularly known as "The Tornadoes", is renowned for brilliant displays which have thrilled spectators on various important occasions including Republic Day Parades and Army Day Parades. The Tornadoes team has numerous World Records and Limca Book of records to their credit. They hold the world record of 'Most Men on a Single Moving Motorcycle' in which 58 riders travelled a distance of 1200 meters in 2 minutes and 14 seconds.

In December 2024, the Tornadoes created three new world records in a single day to celebrate 264th ASC Corps Day. Subedar Pradeep SS set a world record for the longest backward ride on a motorcycle, covering a distance of 361.56 kilometers, Havildar Manish broke the world record for the 'Longest basic hands-free wheelie' travelling 2.349 kilometers and Sepoy Sumit Tomar created a new record for the 'Longest no-hands wheelie' covering a distance of 1,715.4 meters.

== Honours and decorations ==
The Corps has to its credit 17 PVSM, 1 Maha Vir Chakra, 5 Kirti Chakra, 41 AVSM, 14 Vir Chakra, 1 Ashok Chakra Class III*, 23 Shaurya Chakra, 114 Sena Medal among various other decorations. Captain Neikezhakuo Kenguruse was awarded the Maha Vir Chakra (Posthumous) for displaying indomitable resolve, inspiring leadership and self-sacrifice in the highest tradition of the Indian Army during Operation VIJAY.

== Notes ==
1. * Ashoka Chakra Class III was later renamed as Shaurya Chakra.
