= Anshuman Singh (soldier) =

Indian Army officer(1997–2023)

Captain Anshuman Singh KC
- Born: 1997; Deoria, Uttar Pradesh, India
- Died: 2023 (aged 25–26); Siachen Glacier
- Education: Armed Forces Medical College (AFMC), Pune
- Military career
- Allegiance: India
- Branch: Indian Army
- Service years: (2020-2024)
- Rank: Captain
- Service number: (MS-20323K)
- Unit: Punjab Regiment
- Awards: Kirti Chakra (Posthumous)

Captain Anshuman Singh, KC (1997 – 2023) was an Indian Army officer. He was posthumously awarded the Kirti Chakra,India's second-highest peacetime gallantry award, in July 2024.

for his actions during the sacrifice while saving his fellow soldiers during a devastating fire at the Siachen Glacier.

President Droupadi Murmu presenting Kirti Chakra (Posthumous) to Captain Anshuman Singh being received by his mother Manju and Wife Smriti Singh in New Delhi on July 05, 2024
