= Shaurya Chakra =

India's third highest peacetime military decoration

- Shaurya Chakra and its ribbon, the third highest peacetime decoration of India
- Type: Military medal
- Awarded for: Awarded for gallantry otherwise than in the face of the enemy.
- Country: Republic of India
- Presented by: Republic of India
- Eligibility: Officers, men and women of all ranks of the Army, the Navy and the Air Force, of any of the Reserve Forces, of the Territorial Army, Militia and of any other lawfully constituted forces.; Members of the Nursing Services of the Armed Forces.; Civilian Citizens of either sex in all walks of life and members of Police Forces including Central Para-Military Forces and Railway protection Force.
- Post-nominals: SC
- Status: Currently Awarded
- Established: 1952; 74 years ago
- First award: 1952
- Final award: 2025

Highlights
- Total awarded posthumously: 627
- Total recipients: 2122 (As of 2023)

Precedence
- Next (higher): Ati Vishisht Seva Medal

- Equivalent: Vir Chakra (Note: Though the Shaurya Chakra is placed below the Vir Chakra in the precedence, it is considered as a peacetime equivalent of Vir Chakra.)

- Next (lower): Yudh Seva Medal

The Shaurya Chakra (lit. 'Wheel of Gallantry') is an Indian military decoration awarded for valour, courageous action or self-sacrifice while not engaged in direct action with the enemy. It may be awarded to civilians as well as military personnel, sometimes posthumously. It is third in order of precedence of peacetime gallantry awards and comes after the Ashoka Chakra and the Kirti Chakra. It precedes the Yudh Seva Medal.

== History ==
Established as the "Ashoka Chakra, Class III" by the President of India, 4 January 1952 (with effect from 15 August 1947). The statutes were revised and the decoration renamed on 27 January 1967. Before 1967, the award was known as the Ashoka Chakra, Class III. Subsequent awards of the Shaurya Chakra are recognized by a bar to the medal ribbon (to date five have been awarded). It is possible for a recipient to be awarded the Ashoka Chakra or Kirti Chakra in addition for separate acts of gallantry.

Since July 1999, it also being given to Civilians of either gender in all walks of life, other than members of Police Forces and of recognized Fire Services. From 1 February 1999, the central government set a monthly stipend of Rs. 750 (Enhanced to Rs 6000/- pm from 2017) for recipients of the award.

== Design ==
Medal: Circular bronze, 1-3/8 inches in diameter. In the centre, the Ashoka Chakra, surrounded by a lotus wreath and with an ornate edge. Suspended by a straight bar suspender. The medal is named on the edge.

Reverse: For pre-1967 awards, the medal is blank in the centre, with "Ashoka Chakra" in Hindi along the upper edge on the medal and the same name in English along the lower rim, "ASHOKA CHAKRA". On either side is a lotus design. The centre is blank, perhaps with the intent that details of the award be engraved there. There is no indication of the class on the pre-1967 awards. For the post-1967 awards, the, names are changed to "Shaurya Chakra" in Hindi above and "SHAURYA CHAKRA" below.

Ribbon: Green colour ribbon divided into four equal parts by three orange vertical lines.

Bar: If a recipient of the Chakra shall again perform such an act of gallantry as would have made him or her eligible to receive the Chakra, such further act of gallantry shall be recognised by a Bar to be attached to the riband by which the Chakra is suspended and, for every subsequent act of gallantry, an additional Bar shall be added and such Bar or Bars may also be awarded posthumously. For every such Bar, a replica of the Chakra in miniature shall be added to the riband when worn alone.

== Eligibility ==
It is the peacetime equivalent of the Vir Chakra. It is generally awarded for Counter-Insurgency operations and actions against the enemy during peace-time.

Following categories of persons are eligible for the Shaurya Chakra:

- Officers and men and women of all ranks of the Army, the Navy and the Air Force, of any of the Reserve Forces, of the Territorial Army, Militia and of any other lawfully constituted forces.
- Nursing officers of military nursing service .
- Civilian citizens of either sex in all walks of life and members of Police Forces including Central Para-Military Forces and Railway Protection Force.

== Allowances and Benefits to the Recipients ==
- Monetary allowance of ₹ 6,000 per month (enhanced from ₹ 3000 per month in 2017) is sanctioned to recipients irrespective of rank and income. The allowance is admissible to the recipient and upon their death is carried forward to the lawfully married widow. Each and extra bar to the decoration will carry the same amount as admissible to the original award.
- Exempt from deduction of Income Tax According to sub-clause (i) of clause (18) of Section 10 of the Income-Tax Act, 1961 (43 of 1961) of 07.02.2014 any Income by way of pension received by an individual who has been in the service of the Central Government or State Government and recipient of Chakra series medal is Exempt from deduction of Income Tax after satisfying himself about the veracity of the claim.
- Free Train travel facility Indian Railways issues complementary railway card passes enabling free Train travel facility to the recipients and their companion to travel from any railway station to any railway station . As mentioned in 18/2014 E(W)2008/PS5-6/8 of 07.02.2014 they are Entitled to life long free travel in 2nd Ac/ 3rd AC class for self and a companion over all Indian railway trains (except Kolkata metro) inclusive of Rajadhani, Shatabthi and Durunto trains.
- Exempted from payment of Toll fee Ministry of Road Transport and Highways (MoRTH) vide National Highways Fee (Determination of Rates and Collection) Rules, 2008 has notified that chakra series gallantry medal recipients are exempted from payment of user fee even if recipient is traveling in personal vehicle, if such awardee produces ID card issued and authenticated by competent authority.
- State specific grants such as Cash in lieu of land, land, or a one time lump sum grant or monthly annuity are announced as a reward by state governments to the recipients based on their domicile. These vary from ₹75 lakhs (in both Andhra Pradesh and Telangana) to ₹2 to ₹15 lakhs in smaller states.
