= Kirti Chakra =

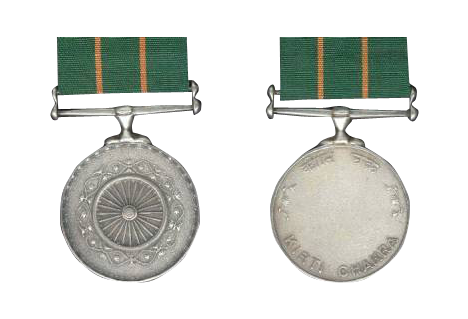
- Kirti Chakra and its ribbon, the second highest peacetime decoration of India
- Type: Military medal
- Awarded for: Awarded for conspicuous gallantry otherwise than in the face of the enemy.
- Country: India
- Presented by: President of India
- Eligibility: Officers, men and women of all ranks of the Army, the Navy and the Air Force, of any of the Reserve Forces, of the Territorial Army, Militia and of any other lawfully constituted forces.; Members of the Nursing Services of the Armed Forces.; Civilian Citizens of either sex in all walks of life and members of Police Forces including Central Para-Military Forces and Railway protection Force.
- Post-nominals: KC
- Status: Currently Awarded
- Established: 1952; 74 years ago
- First award: 1952
- Final award: 2024

Highlights
- Total awarded posthumously: 198
- Total recipients: 487 (As of 2024)

Precedence
- Next (higher): Param Vishisht Seva Medal

- Equivalent: Maha Vir Chakra (Note: Though the Kirti Chakra is placed below the Maha Vir Chakra in the precedence, it is considered as a peacetime equivalent of Maha Vir Chakra.)

- Next (lower): Padma Shri

The Kirti Chakra (lit. 'Wheel of Glory') is an Indian military decoration awarded for valour, courageous action or self-sacrifice away from the field of battle. It may be awarded to civilians as well as military personnel, including posthumous awards. It is the peacetime equivalent of the Maha Vir Chakra. It is second in order of precedence of peacetime gallantry awards, comes after Ashoka Chakra and before Shaurya Chakra. Before 1967, the award was known as the Ashoka Chakra, Class II.

== History ==
Established as the "Ashoka Chakra, Class II" by the President of India, 4 January 1952 (with effect from 15 August 1947). The statutes were revised and the decoration renamed on 27 January 1967. Before 1967, the award was known as the Ashoka Chakra, Class II. Subsequent awards of the Kirti Chakra are recognized by a bar to the medal ribbon. It is possible for a recipient to be awarded the Ashoka Chakra or Shourya Chakra in addition for separate acts of gallantry.

== Design ==
- Medal: It is circular in shape and is made of standard silver, one and three eight inches in diameter.
- Obverse: On the obverse of the medal shall be embossed a replica of Ashoka Chakra in the centre, surrounded by a lotus wreath.
- Reverse:On its reverse shall be embossed the words KIRTI CHAKRA both in Hindi and in English the versions being separated by two lotus flowers.For pre-1967 awards, the medal is blank in the centre, with "Ashoka Chakra" in Hindi along the upper edge on the medal and the same name in English along the lower rim, "ASHOKA CHAKRA". On either side is a lotus design. The centre is blank, perhaps with the intent that details of the award be engraved there. There is no indication of the class on the pre-1967 awards. For the post-1967 awards, the, names are changed to "Kirti Chakra" in Hindi above and "KIRTI CHAKRA" below.
- Ribbon: 30 mm, dark green with two 2 mm saffron stripes. Dark green 8.5 mm, saffron 2 mm, dark green 9 mm, saffron 2 mm, dark green 8.5 mm.
- Bar:If a recipient of the Chakra again performs such an act of gallantry as would have made him or her eligible to receive the Chakra, such further act of bravery shall be recognised by a Bar to be attached to the riband by which the Chakra is suspended. For every Bar awarded, a replica of the Chakra in miniature shall be added to the riband when worn alone.

== Eligibility ==
Personnel Eligible: The following categories of personnel shall be eligible for the Chakra :-

- Officers, men and women of all ranks of the Army, the Navy and the Air Force, of any of the Reserve Forces, of the Territorial Army, Militia and of any other lawfully constituted Armed Forces.
- Members of the Nursing Services of the Armed Forces.
- Civilian citizens of either sex in all walks of life and members of Police Forces including Central Para-Military Forces and Railway Protection Force.

Conditions of Eligibility: The medal is awarded for conspicuous gallantry otherwise than in the face of the enemy. The decoration may be awarded posthumously. Monetary Allowance. Rs. 1050/- pm (Enhanced to Rs 9000/- pm in 2017) and each bar to the decoration will carry the same amount of monetary allowance as admissible to the original award with effect from 1 February 1999.

== Allowances and Benefits to the Recipients ==
- Monetary allowance of ₹ 9,000 per month (enhanced from ₹ 4500 per month in 2017) is sanctioned to recipients irrespective of rank and income. The allowance is admissible to the recipient and upon their death is carried forward to the lawfully married widow. Each and extra bar to the decoration will carry the same amount as admissible to the original award.
- Exempt from deduction of Income Tax According to sub-clause (i) of clause (18) of Section 10 of the Income-Tax Act, 1961 (43 of 1961) of 07.02.2014 any Income by way of pension received by an individual who has been in the service of the Central Government or State Government and recipient of Chakra series medal is Exempt from deduction of Income Tax after satisfying himself about the veracity of the claim.
- Free Train travel facility Indian Railways issues complementary Railway passes enabling the recipients and their companion to travel from any railway station to any railway station. As mentioned in 18/2014 E(W)2008/PS5-6/8 of 07.02.2014 they are entitled to life long free travel in 1st Ac/ Executive class for self and a companion over all Indian railway trains (except Kolkata metro) inclusive of Rajadhani, Shatabthi and Durunto trains.
- Exempted from payment of Toll fee Ministry of Road Transport and Highways (MoRTH) vide National Highways Fee (Determination of Rates and Collection) Rules, 2008 has notified that chakra series gallantry medal recipients are exempted from payment of user fee even if recipient is traveling in personal vehicle, if such awardee produces ID card issued and authenticated by competent authority.
- Discount on air travel through Indian Airlines Recipients of qualifying Level I & II gallantry awards (PVC, MVC, AC, KC) receive a 75% discount on domestic air travel through Indian Airlines based on guidelines issued via Indian Airlines Commercial HQ circulars issued in July 2001 (specifically Letter No. HCD/8R/260, Circular No. 1385/R&T.
- State specific grants such as Cash in lieu of land, land, or a one time lump sum grant or monthly annuity are announced as a reward by state governments to the recipients based on their domicile. These vary from ₹1.25 crore (in both Andhra Pradesh and Telangana) to ₹10 to ₹25 lakhs in smaller states.

== Trivia ==
- Captain (later Lieutenant General) Joginder Singh Gharaya and other 11 persons were first recipients of the Kirti Chakra.
- B.B.L. Datt was the first civilian recipient of the Kirti Chakra.
- Gloria Eva Berry, flight attendant of the ill-fated Air India's Kashmir Princess was the first woman to be awarded the Kirti Chakra (then, Ashok Chakra Class II).
- Wing Commander Ravish Malhotra is the first astronaut to be awarded with the Kirti Chakra.
- Only one soldier, Colonel Neelakantan Jayachandran Nair has been awarded both the Kirti Chakra and the Ashok Chakra, making him the most decorated soldier (for bravery) in India.

Outline:

- Ashoka Chakra, Class II (1952–67)
- Kirti Chakra (1967--)
