= General Pope =

General Pope may refer to:

- Harold Pope (soldier) (1873–1938), Australian Imperial Force temporary brigadier general
- John Pope (military officer) (1822–1892), Union Army major general
- Maurice Arthur Pope (1889–1978), Canadian Army lieutenant general
- Nick Pope (British Army officer) (born 1962), British Army lieutenant general
- Sydney B. Pope (1879–1955), British Indian Army major general
- Vyvyan Pope (1891–1941), British Army lieutenant general

== See also ==
- Richard Pope-Hennessy (1875–1942), British Army major general
