= Tapishwar Narain Raina =

Recipient of Maha Vir Chakra

General Tapishwar Narain Raina MVC, SM
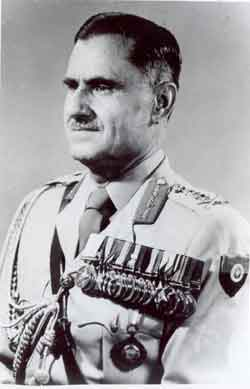

9th Chief of Army Staff (India)
- In office 1 June 1975 – 31 May 1978
- President: Fakhruddin Ali Ahmed; B. D. Jatti; Neelam Sanjiva Reddy
- Prime Minister: Indira Gandhi; Morarji Desai
- Preceded by: General G G Bewoor
- Succeeded by: General O P Malhotra

High Commissioner of India to Canada
- In office February 1979 – May 1980
- Prime Minister: Morarji Desai
- Preceded by: Mahboob Ahmad
- Succeeded by: G.S. Dhillon

Personal details
- Born: 24 January 1921 Srinagar, Jammu and Kashmir, India
- Died: 19 May 1980 (aged 59)
- Awards: Padma Bhushan; Maha Vir Chakra; Mentioned in dispatches

Military service
- Allegiance: British India; India
- Branch/service: British Indian Army; Indian Air Force; Indian Army
- Years of service: 1941–1978
- Rank: General
- Unit: 8th Punjab Regiment; 19th Hyderabad Regiment; Kumaon Regiment
- Commands: Western Army; II Corps; 25th Division; 114 Infantry Brigade; 14 Kumaon
- Battles/wars: World War II; Sino-Indian War; Indo-Pakistan War of 1965; Indo-Pakistan War of 1971
- Service number: IC-1850

General Tapishwar "Tappy" Narain Raina MVC SM (24 January 1921 – 19 May 1980), best known as T.N. Raina, was a senior army officer and a diplomat who served as the 9th Chief of the Army Staff of the Indian Army between 1975 and 1978.

Upon retirement, he was appointed the High Commissioner of India to Canada. He was a recipient of the third highest civilian honour of India, the Padma Bhushan.

== Early life and education ==
Raina was born in a Kashmiri Pandit family on 24 January 1921, the son of Rai Bahadur A. N. Raina, sometime Postmaster-General of Punjab. He received his early education in Ludhiana, where his father had been posted as Head Postmaster. While a college student in Lahore, at the University of the Punjab, Raina joined the 4th Punjab University Training Corps in October 1938.

== Career ==
=== Second World War ===
On 1 May 1941, Raina was attached to the 10th Battalion of the 8th Punjab Regiment, but subsequently considered the air force and briefly served as a cadet in the Indian Air Force during July–August 1941. He then joined the Officers' Training School at Mhow. On 12 April 1942, Raina received an emergency commission as a second lieutenant in the 10th Battalion of 19th Hyderabad Regiment, which became the Kumaon Regiment in 1948. Raina initially joined 10/19 Hyderabad, then at Agra, but was posted to 2/19 Hyderabad in December 1942. In March 1943, he was posted to 1/19 Hyderabad, stationed in Iraq. 1/19 Hyderabad was then part of the 24th Indian Infantry Brigade, attached to the 6th Indian Infantry Division. By the time Raina joined his battalion in Iraq, the major actions in which Iraqforce had been involved in were over. While at Kirkuk, Raina was seriously wounded in a grenade-throwing accident which left him with severe wounds in his thighs and resulted in the loss of an eye. He had a glass eye in place for the rest of his career in the army.

In July 1944, Raina's battalion returned to India and was attached to the 26th Indian Infantry Brigade, which that December was sent to Burma attached to the 36th Indian Infantry Division He was mentioned in dispatches for his service in the Burma Campaign.

=== Post-Independence ===
Over August 1949 - January 1951, Raina served as Indian Army Liaison Officer at the School of Infantry in Warminster, UK.

He was the Brigade Commander at Chushul in Ladakh during November 1962. He was awarded the Maha Vir Chakra for his handling of the Battle of Chushul. He was a veteran of the 1962 war and 1971 wars.

On 5 January 1965, Lieutenant-Colonel Raina was appointed Brigadier General Staff (BGS) of the XXXIII Corps in West Bengal. As a major general, Raina went on to become the General Officer Commanding (GOC) of 25 Infantry Division in Poonch.

On 7 October 1971, Raina was appointed GOC of II Corps in the Khulna sector, with the acting rank of Lieutenant General. He raised the Corps in Krishnanagar and commanded it during operations in the Eastern Theatre of the Indo-Pakistani war of 1971, where it captured the important towns of Khulna, Jessore, Jhenida, Magura and Faridpur and also the area between the rivers Ganges and Padma. For his contributions in the war Raina was awarded the Padma Bhushan.

Raina was appointed General Officer Commanding-in-Chief, Western Command on 27 October 1973. He served as the Chief of Army Staff of the Indian Army from 1 June 1975 to 31 May 1978.

During his tenure as the COAS, the central government led by Indira Gandhi declared a state of national emergency in India. Before the imposition of the emergency, it is believed that the Prime Minister asked for the Army's support in the venture, but General Raina bluntly told the Prime Minister that the army would not be used to 'further her ends' but obey only those orders of a 'legally construed government.' . This was considered a crucial moment that kept the Indian Army out of politics at a critical juncture.

== Later life ==
Raina died on 19 May 1980 in Ottawa, while serving as India's High Commissioner to Canada. Following his funeral and cremation with full military honours in Delhi on 25 May, his son-in-law, together with his nephew, Squadron Leader K. K. Zalpuri, immersed his ashes in the Ganges at Haridwar on 27 May.

== Personal life ==
On 25 February 1949, Raina married Marie Antoinette Florence Kurtz, who was French. The couple had a son, Jyotishwar Narain (1949–March 1974) and a daughter, Anita (born 1952). Jyoti Narain, who followed his father into the Army and joined his old regiment, was killed in a motorcycle accident in March 1974. Anita married Arun Thapan.

== Awards and decorations ==

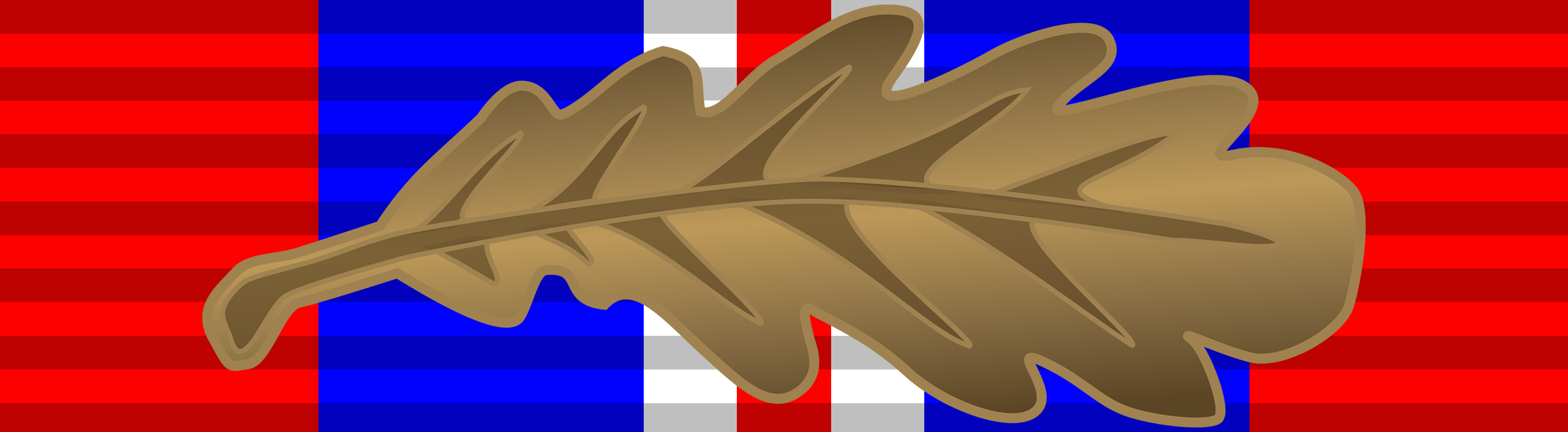

Padma Bhushan	Maha Vir Chakra	Sena Medal	Samar Seva Star
Poorvi Star	Special Service Medal	Sangram Medal	Sainya Seva Medal
Indian Independence Medal	25th Anniversary of Independence Medal	20 Years Long Service Medal	9 Years Long Service Medal
1939–1945 Star	Burma Star	War Medal 1939–1945 (with oak leaf for mention in dispatches)	India Service Medal

== Dates of rank ==
Insignia	Rank	Component	Date of rank
	Second Lieutenant	British Indian Army	12 April 1942 (emergency)
	Lieutenant	British Indian Army	1943 (war-substantive); 2 June 1947 (substantive)
	Captain	British Indian Army	1944 (acting)
	Lieutenant	Indian Army	15 August 1947 (Note: Upon independence in 1947, India became a Dominion within the British Commonwealth of Nations. As a result, the rank insignia of the British Army, incorporating the Tudor Crown and four-pointed Bath Star ("pip"), was retained, as George VI remained Commander-in-Chief of the Indian Armed Forces. After 26 January 1950, when India became a republic, the President of India became Commander-in-Chief, and the Ashoka Lion replaced the crown, with a five-pointed star being substituted for the "pip.")
	Captain	Indian Army	12 April 1948
	Captain	Indian Army	26 January 1950 (recommissioning and change in insignia)
	Major	Indian Army	12 April 1955
	Lieutenant-Colonel	Indian Army	12 April 1958
	Colonel	Indian Army	29 August 1964
	Brigadier	Indian Army	1962 (acting); 5 January 1965 (acting); 1 May 1965 (substantive)
	Major General	Indian Army	19 January 1966 (acting); 14 October 1967 (substantive)
	Lieutenant-General	Indian Army	7 October 1971 (acting); 20 May 1972 (substantive)
	General (COAS)	Indian Army	1 June 1975

== In popular culture ==
In the Bollywood movie 120 Bahadur, which is based on Battle of Rezangla Ajinkya Deo portrayed Brig Raina's character.

== Notes ==
Military offices
Preceded by Gopal Gurunath Bewoor	Chief of Army Staff; 1975–1978	Succeeded by Om Prakash Malhotra
Preceded by M L Thapan	General Officer Commanding-in-Chief Western Command; 1973–1975	Succeeded by Inderjit Singh Gill
