= Lawrence Le Fleming =

English cricketer and British Army officer

Lawrence Julius Le Fleming
- Born: 3 June 1879; Tonbridge, Kent, England
- Died: 21 March 1918 (aged 38); Maissemy, Aisne, France
- Relatives: John Le Fleming (brother); Roger Eustace Le Fleming (nephew)
- Military career
- Allegiance: United Kingdom
- Branch: British Army
- Service years: 1898–1918
- Rank: Brevet Lieutenant-colonel
- Unit: East Surrey Regiment
- Commands: 2 Btn. East Surrey Regt. (1915); 9 Btn. East Surrey Regt. (1917–1918)
- Conflicts: Second Boer War 1899–1902: Battle of Colenso (1899); Battle of Spion Kop (1900); Battle of Vaal Krantz (1900); World War I 1914–1918: Battle of La Bassée (1914); Ypres Salient (1915); Battle of Passchendaele (1917); Battle of St. Quentin (1918)

Brevet Lieutenant-colonel Lawrence Julius Le Fleming (3 June 1879 – 21 March 1918), sometimes known as Lawrie Le Fleming, was an English British Army officer who played first-class cricket for Kent County Cricket Club and the Army. He was career army officer who served in the Second Boer War and World War I, during which he rose to command a battalion on the Western Front. He was wounded twice during the war and killed in action in France in March 1918.

== Early life and family ==
Le Fleming was born in June 1879 at Eton House, Tonbridge in Kent, the sixth and youngest son of the Reverend John and Harriette Le Fleming. His father was employed as an Army tutor at Tonbridge School and all six of the couple's sons attended the school, Lawrence between 1892 and 1896. He played cricket in the school team in his final year at school, scoring over 400 runs and leading the team batting averages, winning an award as a result. He left school from the Army Class at Christmas 1896.

Le Fleming's oldest brother, also named John, played cricket for Kent and was capped once for England at rugby union. After graduating from Cambridge he returned to Tonbridge to take up a post as Army tutor, the same role the brother's father had at the school. He worked at the school whilst Lawrence was a pupil there.

Four of Le Fleming's brothers, including John, served in the Army during World War I. Lawrence married Frances Frend, originally from Argentina but whose three brothers had all attended Tonbridge and were in the military, in December 1914 whilst in England recovering from a wound to the face. His wife died after a sudden illness in July 1917 leaving two infant daughters.

== First-class cricketer ==
Lawrence Le Fleming
Cricket information
- Batting: Right-handed

Career statistics
Competition	First-class
Matches	13
Runs scored	240
Batting average	13.33
100s/50s	0/0
Top score	40
Balls bowled	36
Wickets	0
Bowling average	–
5 wickets in innings	–
10 wickets in match	–
Best bowling	–
Catches/stumpings	3/–
- Source: CricInfo, 20 April 2019

Le Fleming was a right-handed middle-order batsman who played in a total of 13 first-class cricket matches. After one match for the Second XI at Tonbridge in August 1897, Le Fleming made his First XI debut for Kent County Cricket Club at Lord's in a county championship match against Middlesex later the same month. He scored 40 runs in the match, a total which remained his highest score in first-class cricket. He played in eight matches for the county the following year and three in 1899, making a total of 12 appearances for the county First XI.

Le Fleming's oldest brother John also played for Kent, making a total of 40 appearances for the county First XI between 1889 and 1899. Despite their careers overlapping, the brothers never played in the same Kent team.

Le Fleming played club cricket regularly for teams such as Bluebottles, based at Tunbridge Wells, Band of Brothers, a team closely associated with the Kent county club, and Free Foresters as well as playing regularly when posted in India, but did not appear again in county cricket. His only other first-class appearance was for the Army against the Royal Navy at Lord's in 1912, the first year in which inter-services matches were given first-class status, and he played a single Minor Counties Championship match for Kent's Second XI in 1914 just before the outbreak of war.

As well as being a cricketer, Le Fleming played hockey and was a scratch golfer.

== Military career ==
Having been in the Army class at school, Le Fleming joined the 4th Battalion East Surrey Regiment, a militia battalion based at Kingston, Surrey. Initially appointed as a second lieutenant, he was promoted to lieutenant in February 1899.

=== South Africa, 1899–1902 ===
On the outbreak of the Second Boer War he transferred to the regular army on 18 October 1899, joining 2 Battalion East Surrey Regiment as a Second Lieutenant. He joined the battalion in South Africa and saw active service in the force sent to relieve Ladysmith, including at the battles of Colenso in December and Spion Kop and Vaal Krantz in early 1900. Ladysmith was relieved in late February 1900, after which he was briefly hospitalized before returning to duty in April 1900.

After a period of illness between July 1900 and March 1901, he was on active service in South Africa for the remainder of the war, serving mainly in the Transvaal Republic although he also spent some time in Cape Colony and Orange River Colony. Following the end of the war, Le Fleming returned to the United Kingdom on the SS Golconda which arrived at Southampton in mid September 1902. Whilst in South Africa, he was promoted to Lieutenant on 30 January 1901 and received the Queen's South Africa Medal with five clasps and the King's South Africa Medal with two clasps as a result of his war service.

=== Between the wars, 1902–1914 ===
Le Fleming was posted to India with the East Surreys from 1902 to 1909, based at Lucknow and Mhow. He was promoted to captain in 1905 and was recalled to England in 1909 to serve as the adjutant of the regiment's Territorial Force 5 battalion, based at Wimbledon for three years. He rejoined 2 battalion in Burma in 1912 before returning again to Britain the following year to take up a position on the staff at the Royal Military Academy Sandhurst as an instructor.

=== First World War, 1914–1918 ===
After the outbreak of the First World War, Le Fleming resigned his position at Sandhurst to rejoin his regiment in October 1914, serving with 1 battalion in northern France. He fought at the Battle of La Bassée and was wounded in the face at Richebourg-l'Avoué near Bethune towards the end of October. (Note: Le Fleming's obituary in The Times places his first wound at Zonnebeke and second at Richebourg-l'Avoué. Other sources, including those from Tonbridge School archives and Lewis' account of Le Fleming's war service (which used his service records as sources), reverse the locations of the wounds.) The wound was severe enough for him to be invalided home for treatment and it was during his recovery period that Le Fleming married.

Le Fleming returned to active service in March 1915, receiving a promotion to Temporary Major and placed in command of 2 battalion, East Surreys. The battalion was serving on the Ypres Salient and he was wounded again, this time in his foot, east of Zonnebeke at the beginning of April. He was again invalided home to recover, although he was mentioned in dispatches in June and his promotion to Major made permanent on 1 September 1915.

His recovery took until October and afterwards Le Fleming returned to Sandhurst as a General Staff Officer in command of a unit of "Gentlemen cadets", despite requesting a return to frontline service. His work at Sandhurst received praise and he was mentioned in notes by the Secretary of State for War in February 1917. His request for frontline service was eventually accepted and he was promoted to Brevet Lieutenant-colonel before returning to France in June 1917, commanding 9 battalion, East Surreys. His wife became suddenly ill and Le Fleming returned home briefly in July, although by the time he arrived she had already died.

Back in France, 9 battalion saw action between July and November 1917 at the Battle of Passchendaele (Third Ypres) and in March 1918 was in support positions near St. Quentin at the start of the German spring offensive. Le Fleming's men were called into the defence of high ground to the east of Villecholes le Fleming, a village between Maissemy and Vermand. Going ahead of his men to reconnoitre the ground, Le Fleming was shot through the head and died, one of 309 men from the East Surreys killed in action on 21 March 1918.

Although his body was recovered by a volunteer the following day, in the chaos caused by the German offensive it was lost and Le Fleming's burial was never recorded. He is recorded on the Pozières Memorial as well as on the Blythe Memorial at the St Lawrence Ground at Canterbury which records each of Kent's cricketers who died on active service during the First or Second World Wars. A lectern is dedicated to his memory in St Saviour's Church, Tonbridge.
