= Kumaon Regiment =

- Kumaon Regiment cap badge
- Active: 1813 – present
- Country: India
- Branch: Indian Army
- Type: Infantry
- Size: 22 Battalions
- Regimental Centre: Ranikhet, Almora, Uttarakhand, India
- Nickname: Creed of the Man Eaters
- Motto: Parakramo Vijayate (Valour Triumphs)
- March: Bedu Pako Baro Masa
- Decorations: 2 Param Vir Chakras; 4 Ashok Chakras; 1 Padma Vibhushan; 2 Padma Bhushans; 1 Sarvottam Yudh Seva Medal; 8 Param Vishisht Seva Medals; 10 Maha Vir Chakras; 6 Kirti Chakras; 1 Padma Shri; 2 Uttam Yudh Seva Medals; 24 Ati Vishisht Seva Medals; 79 Vir Chakras (including 1 Bar); 23 Shaurya Chakras; 1 Yudh Seva Medal; 129 Sena Medals (including 2 Bars; 36 Vishisht Seva Medals
- Battle honours: Post-Independence Srinagar (Badgam), Walong (Arunachal Pradesh), Rezang La, Gadra City, Bhaduria, Daudkandi, Sanjoi Mirpur and Shamsher Nagar

Commanders
- Colonel of the Regiment: Lt Gen Ram Chander Tiwari
- Notable commanders: General S. M. Shrinagesh; General K. S. Thimayya; General T. N. Raina

Insignia
- Regimental Insignia: A demi-rampant lion holding a cross crosslet. The demi-rampant lion is part of the arms of the Russell family whose ancestor had started the body of troops now formed into the Kumaon Regiment.

The Kumaon Regiment is one of the oldest infantry regiments of the Indian Army. The regiment traces its origins to the 18th century and has fought in every major campaign of the British Indian Army and the Indian Army, including the two world wars, and is one of the highest decorated regiments of the Indian Army.

== Recruitment of troops ==
The Kumaon Regimental Centre, established at Ranikhet, recruits Kumaoni people from the Kumaon division of Uttarakhand, Himachal and Ahirs from Haryana, Uttar Pradesh, Bihar, Rajasthan and other parts.

== History ==
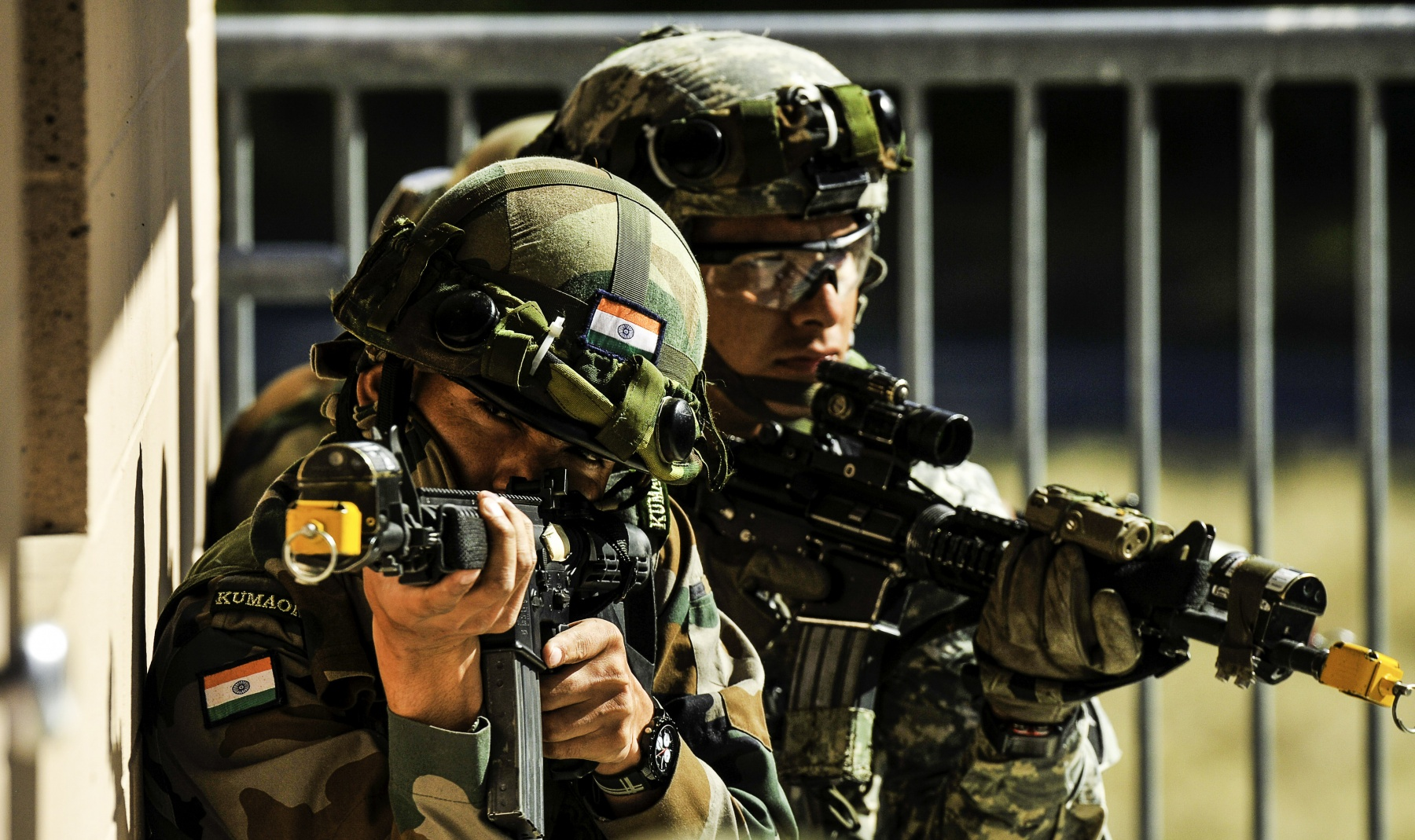
Indian soldiers from the 6th Battalion, Kumaon Regiment pull security before entering a room while conducting company movement procedures with the United States Army during Ex. Yudh Abhyas 2015 at Joint Base Lewis-McChord, Washington.

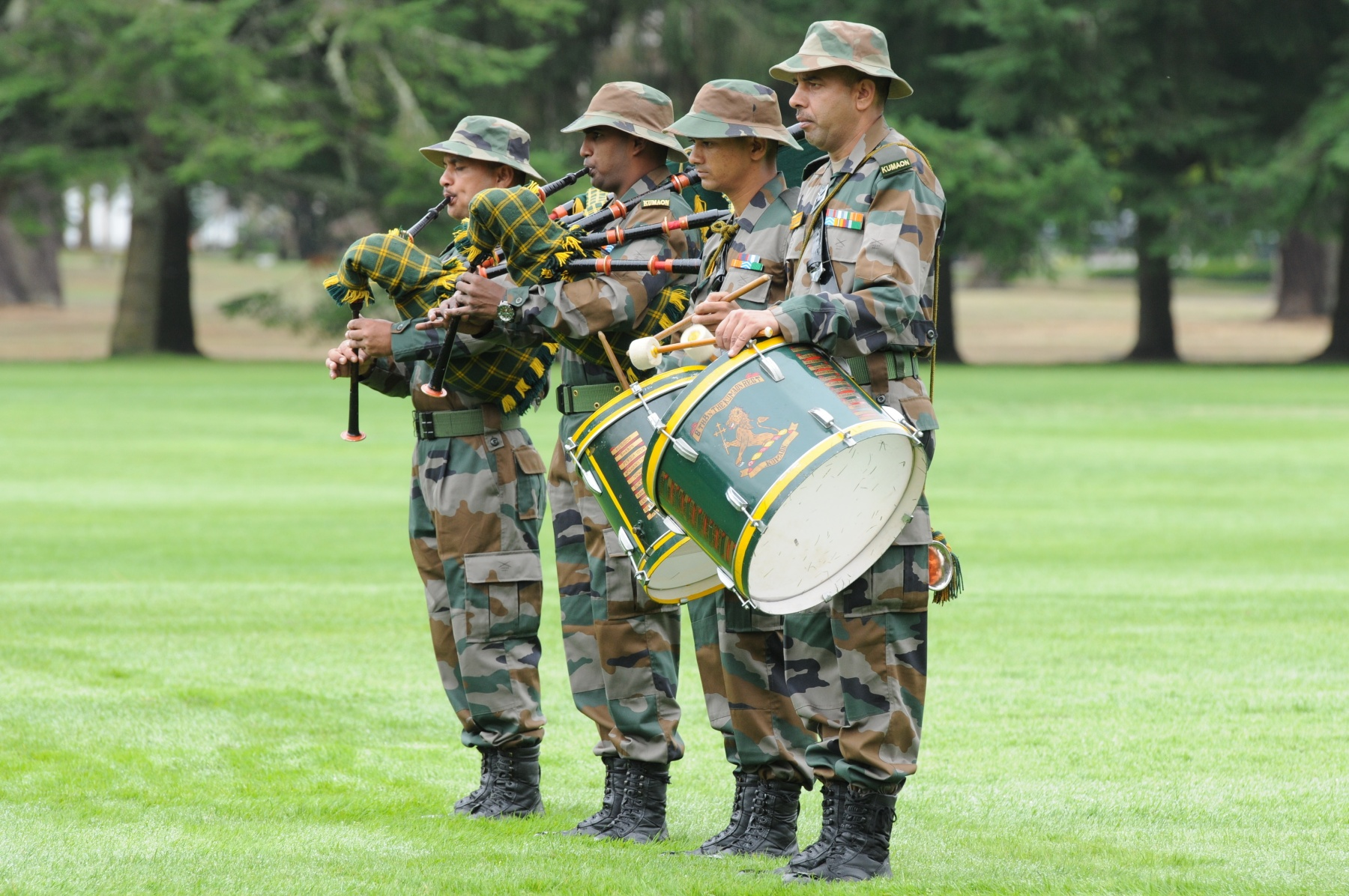
Members of the Kumaon Regiment Pipes and Drums during the opening ceremony of Yudh Abhyas in 2015.

Soldiering has been an important profession of the Kumaonis and the region has a long history of warfare with neighbours, including the Nepal and Garhwal. The Kumaonis were never fully subjugated by the powerful Muslim dynasties of Delhi. They often offered their martial services as mercenaries, and fought on British side in the Anglo-Nepalese War.

The Fierce fighting battalions of the Nizam of Hyderabad made up of Kumaonis and men from this region of the Himalayan foothills. Well before the split from royal Gurkha rifles, the kumaonis had been enlisted in the five regiments of Gurkhas belonging to the Bengal Infantry and the Punjab Frontier Force. The Third Gorkha Rifles recruited heavily from the then greater kumaon kingdom(which included parts of terai presently in Nepal) the large recruitment of Kumaonis led to this being known the Kemaoon Battalion.

The Kumaonis were recruited in the military of the East India Company from the early 19th century. They often moved to other states in search of military service, including in the service of the Nizam of Hyderabad.

The Nizam's Contingent was formed when Richard Wellesley, 1st Marquess Wellesley, brother of Arthur Wellesley, 1st Duke of Wellington, became Governor-General of India and formed a plan to rid India of French influence. His first action, on arriving in India in 1798, was to effect the disbandment of the Indian units of the Nizam under the command of Monsieur Raymond and officered by non-British Europeans. These soldiers were formed into the British officered Nizam's Contingent that fought at the Battle of Seringapatam in 1799 against Tippu Sultan in the final battle of the Fourth Anglo-Mysore War.

In 1813, Sir Henry Russell, then British Resident in the court of Nizam of Hyderabad, raised the Russell Brigade comprising two battalions. Later, four more battalions were raised and they were known as the Berar Infantry. In addition, two battalions known as the Elichpur Brigade, were raised by Nawab Salabat Khan, Subedar of Berar, as a part of the Nizam's forces. The men of the Russell Brigade were chiefly Hindus, recruited from Oudh and other parts of Uttar Pradesh. Kumaonis, along with other North Indian classes served in the Hyderabad contingent which was raised, trained and led by British officers under Russell, but paid for by the Nizam of Hyderabad.

By 1853, at the time of the signing of a treaty between the Nizam and the British, the Nizam's forces consisted of 8 battalions. The force was renamed as the Hyderabad Contingent, and became part of the British Indian Army, subsequently, becoming the 19th Hyderabad Regiment. Over time, the class composition changed to Kumaonis and Ahirs.

During World War I, a Kumaon battalion was raised at Ranikhet on 23 October 1917 as 4/39th Kumaon Rifles. In 1918, it was redesignated as 1st Battalion, 50th Kumaon Rifles and a second battalion was raised. These were merged with the Hyderabad Contingent into the 19th Hyderabad Regiment in 1923. The first battalion of the 50th Kumaon Rifles survived to become the 1st Kumaon Rifles, and is today the 3rd Battalion, Kumaon Regiment (Rifles) of the Indian Army. Some units of the Berar and Elichpur infantry were demobilized after World War I. However, the Hyderabad Regiment was again expanded during World War II.

On 27 October 1945, after the Second World War, the 19th Hyderabad Regiment was renamed as 19th Kumaon Regiment. Post-independence, it has been known as the Kumaon Regiment.

Two state forces battalions, 4th Gwalior Infantry and Indore Infantry were allocated to the Kumaon Regiment becoming 14 Kumaon (Gwalior) and 15 Kumaon (Indore) respectively.

The Kumaon Regiment has produced three Indian Army Chiefs: General Satyawant Mallannah Shrinagesh (4 Kumaon), General Kodendera Subayya Thimayya (4 Kumaon) and General Tapishwar Narain Raina (14 Kumaon).

== Affiliations ==
- The senior battalion, 1 Kumaon, originally raised in March 1813, was converted to the airborne role in 1946. It fought with distinction in the Indo-Pakistani War of 1947 as 1 Kumaon (Para). It remained a part of the regiment until April 1952 when it was formally inducted into the Parachute Regiment as 3 Para (Kumaon). In 2000, the battalion was converted to Special Forces as part of the expansion of the special operations forces of the Indian Army, and renamed 3rd Battalion Para (Special Forces) or 3 Para (SF).

Upon conversion to Para(SF), class composition has been made heterogeneous, consisting of men from all across India.

- On 1 November 1970, the Naga Regiment was raised and affiliated with the Kumaon Regiment. The class composition of this regiment comprises Nagas, Kumaonis, Garhwalis and Gurkhas.
- A Border Scouts battalion was raised and named as "Kumaon Scouts".
- 14 Kumaon (Gwalior), was converted to the mechanised infantry role, and transferred to the Mechanised Infantry Regiment, as its 5th Battalion.

== Engagements ==
=== World War I ===
During World War I, the first all Kumaoni battalions were raised. The first was formed in 1917 as the 19th Kumaon and redesignated in 1918 as the 1st Battalion, 50th Kumaon Rifles when it fought in the Battle of Megiddo (1918). A 2nd Battalion was also raised in 1918 but disbanded in 1923. The Hyderabad Contingent, with its mixed Kumaoni, Jats, Ahirs and Deccan Muslims, continued and fought with distinction in the Great War. In 1922, during the Indian Army reorganisation, the six regiments of the Hyderabad Contingent were renamed as the 19th Hyderabad Regiment and infantry companies formed from the Kumaon region replaced many of the Deccan Muslim-based companies. In 1923 the 1/50th Kumaon Rifles joined the 19th Hyderabad Regiment as the 1st Kumaon Rifles. In 1935 the battalion commanders attempted to have the regiment renamed as the 19th Kumaon Regiment, due to the diminishing links to the Deccan and Hyderabad regions. The request was refused.

=== World War II ===
The 19th Hyderabad Regiment in 1939 consisted of four regular battalions; the 1st (Russell's), 2nd (Berar), 4th and The Kumaon Rifles. The Hyderabads expanded during the war adding another eight battalions to the 19th Hyderabad Regiment. Two more battalions, the 1st and 2nd Hyderabad Infantry, were raised as part of the Indian State Forces. The battalions of the 19th Hyderabad Regiment fought in the Middle East, North African campaign, Persia, Battle of Malaya, Battle of Singapore and Burma campaign.

The Kumaon Rifles were based in Hong Kong at the beginning of the Second World War but were transferred to the Middle East as part of the 24th Indian Infantry Brigade. The battalion took part in the Anglo-Soviet invasion of Iran in 1941 under Major-General William Slim. They remained in Persia as part of the garrison throughout the rest of the war.

The 4th Battalion was part of the 12th Indian Infantry Brigade based in Malaya when the Japanese Army invaded in December 1941. The 4/19th Hyderabads were one of the few battalions in Malaya that were relatively well trained in jungle warfare. Although the battalion performed well in the fighting retreat in north-west Malaya, they were practically annihilated at the disastrous Battle of Slim River on 7 January 1942. The few survivors of the 4th Battalion were withdrawn to Singapore where they took part in the brief defence of the island before it surrendered on 15 February 1942.

=== Indo-Pakistani War of 1947-48 ===
1 Kumaon(airborne) [now 3rd PARA SF] and 4 Kumaon was dispatched to Jammu and Kashmir to participate in the defence of Srinigar. 4 Kumaon elements were decisive in the Battle of Badgam. The valor of kumaonis saved kashmir from Pakistani intruders, in recognition of the gallant action in kashmir, 1st and 4th kumaon were hailed as the saviors of kashmir and bestowed with the battle honor "Srinagar(badgam)". It was for this action that Major Somnath Sharma was posthumously awarded the Param veer chakra. It was a singular honour for the kumaon regiment to be the first to win the highest recognition for gallantry in the face of enemy.

=== Sino-Indian War of 1962 ===
==== Battle of Walong ====
On 21 October 1962, the Chinese attacked the Dhola sector in Arunachal Pradesh's Kameng Division at a post at Kibithu (40 km north of Walong). The battle started by Chinese machine guns and mortars fire from south of Sama, followed by infantry attacks on two platoons with over 3000 soldiers. It started at around midnight and went on for three hours. At about 5 am, the Chinese reinforced their assaulting troops and launched another fierce attack. About 60-70 Chinese soldiers died in that attack and four Indian soldiers were killed, including Naik Bahadur Singh Vir Chakra awardee of Kumaon Regiment, who took over the light machine gun (LMG) after his LMG detachment was killed, and kept firing till he was hit in the chest. In the days to follow, multiple such skirmishes and change in deployments took place, both from the Indian and the Chinese side. Acknowledging that Kibithu could not be defended, 6 Kumaon was ordered to withdraw to Walong.

"23 October marks a landmark win against the 153 Regt of PLA (Chengdu Sub area) when Delta Company of 6 Kumaon under Lt Bikram Singh Rathore (IC 11867) was ordered to establish screen position on Ashi Hill (NH 5484). Lt. Bikram Singh planned and executed a classic ambush at a small hanging bridge over Namti Nallah (5 km away from Walong). Lt Bikram removed the last few planks of the hanging bridge and positioned his men at various positions adjoining Namti Nullah and sighted the MMGs and Mortars of his men on spots likely to be enemy position and to bring down accurate fire. Lt Bikram Singh briefed his soldiers to hold fire until he fired the first 'Very Light'. At 3 a.m. on 23 October, the Chinese Army marching towards Walong walked down Ashi hill to reach the hanging bridge on Namti Nullah. The first Chinese soldier of 153 Regiment crossed the bridge and stepped on the last few plank and fell into the nullah. The following Chinese soldiers milled around and Lt. Bikram Singh fired the first Very Light revealing the Chinese in a cramped path of a planned accurate fire of Indian MMG and Mortar fire. About 200 Chinese troops were killed or wounded in this action against nine Indian fatalities. At 4 a.m. the screen by Delta Company of 6 Kumaon was ordered to withdraw.

After the success at Namti Nullah, The Delta Company of 6 Kumaon was tasked to occupy critical defenses on "West Ridge" overlooking the Advanced Landing Grounds, Walong.

On 5 November, there were multiple exchanges of fire between the Indian and the Chinese troops when a company under then Captain Ravi Mathur was asked to occupy Green Pimple and rescue an Assam Rifles patrol which was ambushed in the area.

On 14 November 1962, 6 Kumaon attacked and captured Chinese defenses in the Walong sector, Arunachal Pradesh, without any artillery or aerial support. This was the only battle of the war in which an Indian unit attacked the Chinese, rather than defending. The attack continued until 15 November but the captured positions could not be sustained because of a lack of ammunition, heavy casualties and large enemy buildup.

The main Battle of Walong was on 16 November, when a large number of soldiers of the PLA 130th Division (People's Republic of China) attack on approx. 100 soldiers of Delta Company of 6 Kumaon which were holding West Ridge. Lt. Bikram was tasked to hold this defense at all costs till 1100 hours and he promised Brigadier N.C. Rawley that he would never withdraw & hold on till his end. Waves of Chinese attacks came on his post one after the other. However, Kumaonis fought gallantly and repulsed the attack. Then the Chinese fanned out and the next attack came with an overwhelming superiority of numbers from three sides (the fourth side was a steep cliff) and was supported by machine gun fire & artillery bombardment. The tenacity of the troops still prevented the Chinese from capturing West Ridge, however at a heavy price in lives. By now, Lt Bikram Singh had held on to the post well beyond the assigned time of 1100 hrs. He was now left with a handful of troops, all their ammunition was exhausted and had no logistical support. They then engaged in hand-to-hand combat and fought to the last man and bullet. In the words of Brig. N. C. Rawlley, MC,

"He (Lt. Bikram Singh) held on as long as humanly possible. Very few men from his Company managed to escape. The bulk of them being killed and wounded on the hill. Under his courageous and gallant leadership the men fought until all their ammunition was exhausted and they were completely overrun. Bikram's message to me over the wireless was that he would hold on and not withdraw. He has fulfilled these words to the limit."

It is said that five times as many Chinese soldiers died in this battle of 16 November on West Ridge. Only 17 Indian soldiers of Delta Company returned from this battle.

In March 1963, a cremation party of 6 Kumaon, led by Maj Prem Nath Bhatia reached Walong to cremate Lt. Bikram Singh and soldiers of Delta Company on West Ridge, however, due to heavy snow, the operation could not be completed. Subsequently, this assignment could not be completed because of the untimely death of Maj. Bhatia in 1965, in a road accident. In 1986 (almost 24 years after the Battle of Walong) a patrol party of the 6th Battalion of The Assam Regiment climbed up to West Ridge and discovered the skeletal remains of the soldiers of Delta Company of 6 Kumaon who died fighting on 16 November 1962. A lot of war relics such as helmets, LMG magazines, water bottles and used/burnt ammunition and a pair of binoculars (possibly of the company commander, Lt. Bikram Singh) were also found on the site. The Patrol party of 6th Assam Regiment cremated the bodies of at least 37 soldiers of Delta Company and kept their ashes in a make shift memorial on the West Ridge. 6th Assam Regiment also constructed a memorial of "Unknown Soldiers" displaying the helmets and battle relics. This memorial is also known as Helmet Top Post and is a short drive from Walong town. Based on this development, the records of the Kumaon Regiment have been updated with the following citation "remarks Killed/missing mentioned on the authorization of ....... Records of the Kumaon Regiment. Letter no A4/380/6/Stats dt/ 15/04/88 (Ref File No. 260/on Page 97)".

Five Vir Chakras were awarded to 6 Kumaon for their actions in the battle. They were awarded to (1) Maj. Prem Nath Bhatia (2) Capt Ravi Kumar Mathur (3) Capt. B.C. Chopra, AMC (4) Nk. Bahadur Singh (5) Lt. A.S. Khatri. The battalion celebrates 14 November as Walong Day.

==== Battle of Rezang La ====
120 men of C Company of 13 Kumaon, commanded by Maj. Shaitan Singh, made a last stand at the Rezang La pass on 18 November 1962. 13 Kumaon is the only Ahir battalion of regiment.

The area assigned to C Company was defended by three platoon positions, but the surrounding terrain isolated 13 Kumaon from the rest of the battalion. The Indian artillery was located behind a hill feature blocking the line of fire so the infantry had to fight the battle without artillery support. The Chinese suffered no such disadvantage and brought heavy artillery fire upon C Company.

The Chinese attack, which was expected, came through a dry river bed. It was repulsed with heavy machine gun fire by the Indian soldiers. The Chinese regrouped and attacked persistently with more reinforcements. Maj. Shaitan Singh went from post to post raising the morale of his men and continued to fight even after being seriously wounded. Of C Company's 120 troops, 114 men were killed; 5 were severely injured and captured. They are all said to have escaped captivity and returned. The other remaining survivor was sent by Shaitan Singh to inform the headquaraters. The Chinese casualties are not known, but a memorial in Rewari claims that 1,300 Chinese soldiers were killed in the battle.

Maj. Shaitan Singh posthumously won the Param Vir Chakra for his actions, the second for the Kumaon Regiment (the first being won by Maj. Somnath Sharma). Other soldiers defending Rezang La who were awarded Vir Chakras were Nk. Hukum Chand (posthumous), Nk. Gulab Singh Yadav, L/Nk. Ram Singh (posthumous), Sub. Ram Kumar and Sub. Ram Chander.

=== Indo-Pakistan War of 1965 ===
==== Battle of Kumaon Hill ====
Two Kumaoni Battalions continued to operate against the guerrillas. One Infantry Brigade was ordered to oust the enemy from the area, own side of a river and destroy the bridges.

The enemy was holding the area with a company of 23 Azad Kashmir and one company of the Pakistani special forces unit – Special Service Group . Lt Col Salick decided to attack the feature with two Companies. It was to be a silent attack, though the battalion had adequate artillery support on call. The leading platoon under Jemadar Ram Singh hit an enemy minefield shortly after midnight on 21 September. Despite being wounded, this brave JCO pressed forward to find a way through the mines.

At 7.45 AM the assaulting companies resumed the advance. Despite the heavy automatic fire that greeted them, the Kumaonis charged. In the initial assault, Capt (later Maj Gen) Surendra Shah, and his signaller were wounded. The fighting thereafter was fierce and continued for two and a half hours. Capt Shah was wounded a second time but he refused to be evacuated till the battle was over.

The Kumaonis tenacity ultimately won the day and the hill was in their hands at 10 AM. For conspicuous gallantry in the action, Capt Surendra Shah received Vir Chakra. Another recipient of this award was Nk Chander Singh. In addition to these awards, one officer and two JCOs were Mentioned in Despatches. To commemorate the Kumaonis victory, the hill was named the KUMAON Hill.

It was a significant achievement as a regular infantry battalion's Kumaoni troops ousted re-enforced enemy positions at significant heights occupied by better equip enemy special forces unit.

This however was not the last encounter between the kumaoni troops and Pakistani commandos as they faced off again on the icy heights of siachen in '84.

==== 3rd Kumaon (Rifles) ====
The Chhamb sector saw heavy fighting between the Indian and Pakistani troops. On moving from Srinagar to Akhnur, 3rd Kumaon was ordered to undertake several operations against the Pakistani forces in this sector. One of these included a raid on Gulaba-Chappar, a strong enemy position, in which 63 casualties were inflicted on the enemy at loss of 5 (4 injured, 1 Killed). Large quantities of arms and ammunitions were captured.

Later, the Battalion was tasked with capturing the Keri-Pail area held by approximately one infantry battalion. At 3:15 AM, the battalion's A Coy, led by Major Dhirendra Nath Singh, charged the enemy post at Keri and captured it after a fierce hand-to-hand fight. Meanwhile, C Coy had made an abortive attack on Pail and was held by the positions Pakistani defenders. Then, a counterattack from the Pakistanis drove C Coy back, who were able to successfully retreat under A Coy's fire.

==== Battle of Maharajke ====
Another Kumaon Battalion captured 'Maharajke' in West Pakistan with a fierce attack during the night of 6 and 7 September 1965. On 13 September 1965, the Battalion attacked and captured village Pagowal an enemy stronghold which was 13 miles inside Pakistan. Not content with this, by 23 September 1965 (the day cease fire came into effect) the Battalion had made another deep wedge into Pakistani territory.

Nk Ganesh Dutt was awarded Vir Chakra for his conspicuous bravery. The Battalion was also awarded four Mentioned in Dispatches and four Chief of the Army Staff Commendation Cards during these operations and was bestowed with the Theatre Honour 'Punjab'.

==== Battle of Chhamb ====
To preempt Pakistani attacks into India, a Kumaon battalion advanced into the Mandiala Heights in West Pakistan at the end of August 1965. Before they had the chance to set up any defenses, the Pakistan Army began a major offensive in the Chhamb sector during the early hours of 1 September, accompanied by massive artillery shelling targeting the Kumaon battalion's positions. There followed an armoured thrust by two Pakistani armoured divisions. Faced with enemy advancing from 3 sides, the battalion held off for a day and a half. On 2 September, the battalion was ordered to withdraw after they had destroyed four Pakistani tanks. One Vir Chakra was awarded for the action.

=== Indo-Pakistan War of 1971 ===
Kumaon battalions were deployed and fought on both the Eastern and the Western fronts during the war.

=== Operation Meghdoot ===
The Indian Army's initiative to hold the Siachen Glacier consisted of units of the Kumaon Regiment and the Ladakh Scouts. It was led by Maj. R.S. Sandhu, who was awarded the Vir Chakra for his leadership. Capt. Sanjay Kulkarni's unit was the first to land on Bilafond La and hoist the Indian tricolour. Kumaon units were instrumental in Indian success in capturing the glacier and repelling Pakistani attempts to retake it.

Anticipating a Pakistani attack on the glacier at the start of the spring thaw in 1984, a full Kumaon battalion led by Lt. Col. (later Brigadier) D.K. Khanna, marched on foot with full packs and equipment for weeks in the dead of the winter across Zoji La, through the world's toughest terrain, highest altitudes and most forbidding climate. To their credit they achieved this without suffering a serious casualty or a single fallout en route. They also became the first battalion to operate as a unit in the Nubra Valley and on the Siachen Glacier.

19 Kumaon was the first battalion to hoist the Indian flag on the Saltoro Ridgeline (at Point 5705, an altitude of 18,717 feet) in the face of enemy fire, thus dominating Gyongla (18,655 feet) which was under enemy occupation. On 29 May 1984, 19 Kumaon lost 19 of its best soldiers, including one officer (2Lt. P.S. Poondir), who had volunteered to obey orders which they fully knew could take them to their certain death. During April and May 1984, 19 Kumaon was spread all through the area of Siachen with Capt. Roshan Lal Yadav at the Indira Col, Maj. Shashi Kant Mahajan and Maj. Darshan Lal Julka on the Central Glaciers (Gyongla, Zingrulma Lagongma, and Layogma Glaciers) and Maj B B Dhyani with Alpha company was in the Urdelop Glacier. 19 Kumaon was thus the first battalion ever to be spread out so much on the glacier (about 100 km), which, perhaps, no other battalion has been subjected to ever since.

Nk. (later Subedar/Honorary Captain) Ram Mehar Singh was awarded the Shaurya Chakra for his gallant role during the move. This turned out to be a vital move that enabled Indian victory in Operation Meghdoot.

=== Operation Pawan ===
Kumaon units were deployed to Sri Lanka during Operation Pawan. A Kumaon battalion was the first Indian Army unit to land in Jaffna at the Palali airfield. It successfully cleared the Kokuvil area, and moving to Mallakam. A number of LTTE militants were killed or captured.

Another battalion was deployed to search and destroy LTTE camps in the Kumurupiddi and Irrakandi areas of the Trincomalee Sector. Among the areas in which Kumaon units were deployed and operated included Kilividdi of Muttur Sector, Sampur, Vellvutturai and Point Pedro.

=== Kargil War ===
Kumaon units were deployed during Operation Vijay to oust Pakistan Army regulars who had infiltrated the Kargil sector in Ladakh posing as insurgents. In difficult terrain and hostile weather conditions, they cleared and captured a number of altitude features. The regiment was honored with a number of gallantry awards for the operations.

== Units ==
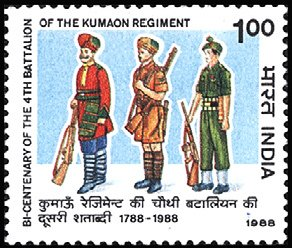
1988 postal stamp to mark the bicentenary of the 4th Battalion

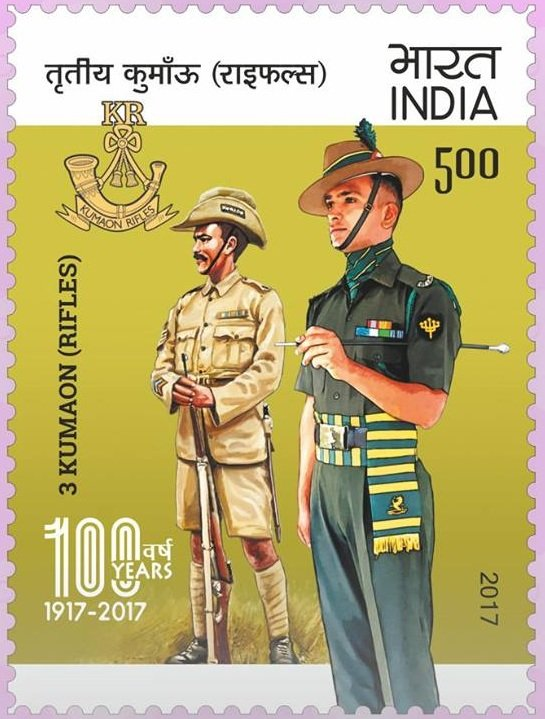
Stamp issued in 2017 on the occasion of the Centenary of the 3rd Battalion (Rifles) of the Kumaon Regiment.

Present units

- 2nd Battalion (Berar Battalion)
- 3rd Battalion (Battle of Sharon, Kumaon Rifles)
- 4th Battalion (The Fighting Fourth, First PVC Paltan)
- 5th Battalion (Fierce Fifth)
- 6th Battalion (Jangis)
- 7th Battalion (Satvir Paltan)
- 8th Battalion (Elite Eight)
- 9th Battalion (Gallant Ninth)
- 11th Battalion (Double First)
- 12th Battalion (Daudkhandis)
- 13th Battalion (Rezangla Battalion, Second PVC Paltan, Bravest of The Brave)
- 15th Battalion (former Indore State Infantry, Imperial Service Troops) (Bravest of The Brave)
- 16th Battalion (The Maneaters)
- 17th Battalion (Bhaduria Paltan)
- 18th Battalion (Siachen Srilankan Warriors)
- 19th Battalion (The Mountain Marauders)
- 20th Battalion (Buzzing Bees)
- 21st Battalion
- 22nd Battalion (Dauntless Double Two)

Scouts

- Kumaon Scouts

Territorial Army units

- 111 Infantry Battalion Territorial Army (Kumaon): Allahabad, Uttar Pradesh
- 130 Infantry Battalion Territorial Army (Kumaon) (Ecological): Pithoragarh, Uttarakhand

Rashtriya Rifles units

- 13 Rashtriya Rifles
- 26 Rashtriya Rifles
- 50 Rashtriya Rifles

Former units:

- 1st Battalion is now 3 Para Special Forces (Russel's Vipers)
- 10th Battalion is now the Kumaon Regimental Centre
- 14th Battalion (former Gwalior State Infantry, Imperial Service Troops) is now 5 Mechanised Infantry

Affiliations
The Kumaon Regiment also has affiliated to it three battalions of the Naga Regiment, a Navy ship and an Air Force Squadron.

== Battle honours ==
As on date the regiment has earned 23 battle honours. Of these, 9 have been awarded in the post-Independence period. The list of battle and theatre honours of the Kumaon Regiment are as follows:

Pre-World War I: (Note: Repugnant battle honours are marked with an asterisk superscript (like this ^{*}).) Nagpore^{*} – Maheidpoor^{*} – Nowah^{*} – Central India^{*} – Burma 1885–87^{*} – China 1900 – Afghanistan 1919.

World War I: Neuve Chapelle – France and Flanders 1914–15 – Suez Canal – Egypt 19l5–16 – Gaza – Jerusalem – Megiddo – Sharon – Nablus – Palestine 1917–18 – Tigris 1916 – Khan Baghdadi – Mesopotamia 1915–18 – Persia 1915–18 – Suvla – Landing at Suvla – Scimitar Hill – Gallipoli 1915 – Macedonia 1916–18 – East Africa 1914–16 – North-West Frontier India 1914–15, 1916–17.

World War II: (Note: Theatre honours are shown in italics.) North Malaya – Slim River – Malaya 1941–42 – Kangaw – Bishenpur – Burma 1942–45.

Post-Independence:

Indo-Pakistani War of 1947–48

Srinagar – Jammu and Kashmir 1947–48

Sino-Indian War

Walong – Battle of Walong, Arunachal Pradesh 1962
Rezang La – Ladakh 1962

Indo-Pakistani Conflict 1965

Sanjoi-Mirpur – Jammu and Kashmir 1965 – Punjab 1965

Indo-Pakistani War of 1971

Bhaduria – Shamsher Nagar – East Pakistan 1971 – Jammu and Kashmir 1971 – Punjab 1971 – Gadra City – Sindh 1971.

== Decorations ==
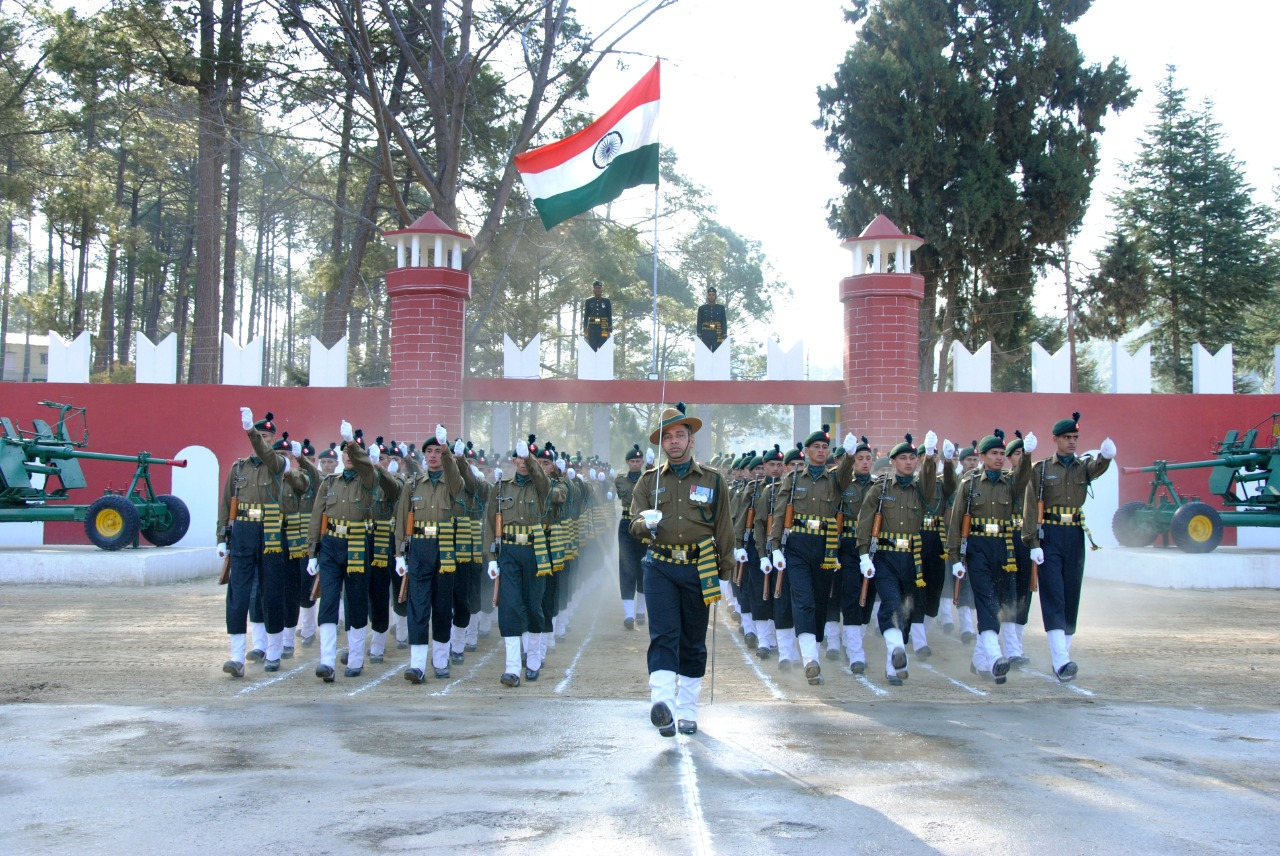
Attestation cum Passing Out Parade at Kumaon Regimental Centre, Ranikhet, September 2021.

The Kumaon Regiment is one of the most decorated regiment in the Indian Army. The regiment has won 2 Param Vir Chakras, 4 Ashoka Chakras, 10 Maha Vir Chakras, 6 Kirti Chakras, 79 Vir Chakras (including 1 Bar), 23 Shaurya Chakras, 8 Param Vishisht Seva Medals, 2 Uttam Yudh Seva Medals, 24 Ati Vishisht Seva Medals, 1 Yudh Seva Medal, 129 Sena Medals (including 2 Bars), 36 Vishisht Seva Medals, 1 Padma Vibhushan, 2 Padma Bhushans, 1 Padma Shri, and 3 Chief of the Army Staff's Commendation.

Param Vir Chakra Recipients;

- Major Somnath Sharma (posthumous), 4 Kumaon (Badgam) – Indo-Pakistani War of 1947
- Major Shaitan Singh (posthumous), 13 Kumaon (Rezang La)- Sino-Indian War

Ashoka Chakra Recipients:

- Major Bhukant Mishra (posthumous), 15 Kumaon – Operation Blue Star
- Naik Nirbhay Singh (posthumous), 15 Kumaon – Operation Blue Star
- Subedar Sujjan Singh Yadav (posthumous), 13 Kumaon
- Naik Rambeer Singh Tomar (posthumous), 15 Kumaon

Maha Vir Chakra Recipients:

- Lieutenant Colonel Dharam Singh – Indo-Pakistan War of 1947
- Sepoy Man Singh (posthumous) – Indo-Pakistan War of 1947
- Naik Nar Singh (posthumous) – Indo-Pakistan War of 1947
- Sepoy Dewan Singh – Indo-Pakistan War of 1947
- Major Malikiat Singh Brar (posthumous) – Indo-Pakistan War of 1947
- Brigadier (later General) Tapishwar Narain Raina – Sino-Indian War

Mention-in-Dispatch Col Prakash Bhatt 18 KR

Chief of the Army Staff's Commendation:

- Brigadier S. K. Sapru
- Brigadier Dara Govadia
- Major S. S. Sidhu

== Colonels of the Regiment ==
- Maj. Gen. S.B. Pope, DSO, CB – 28 August 1931 to 31 May 1949
- Gen. K.S. Thimayya, Padma Bhushan, DSO – 1 June 1949 to 8 May 1961
- Lt. Gen. Kanwar Bahadur Singh, MBE – 16 May 1961 to 15 May 1971
- Gen. T.N. Raina, Padma Bhushan, MVC – 16 May 1971 to 31 May 1978
- Lt. Gen. P.N. Kathpalia, PVSM, AVSM – 1 June 1978 to 31 October 1985
- Lt. Gen. R.N. Mahajan, PVSM, AVSM – 1 November 1985 to 31 July 1991
- Lt. Gen. D.D. Saklani, PVSM, AVSM – 1 August 1991 to 31 December 1993
- Lt. Gen. M.M. Lakhera, PVSM, AVSM, VSM, ADC – 1 June 1994 to 31 October 1995
- Maj. Gen. Surendra Shah, VrC, VSM – 1 November 1995 to 31 July 2001
- Maj. Gen. A.K. Sarwate AVSM – 1 August 2001 to 28 February 2003
- Lt. Gen. A.S. Bahia, PVSM, AVSM** – 1 March 2003 to April 2006
- Lt. Gen. Satyevir Yadav, PVSM, UYSM, AVSM – May 2006 to December 2007
- Lt. Gen. Avadhesh Prakash, PVSM, AVSM, VSM – January 2008 to January 2010
- Lt Gen. NC Arun Parashar, PVSM, UYSM, AVSM – February 2010 to May 2013
- Lt. Gen. Om Prakash, PVSM, UYSM, AVSM, SM – June 2013 to 30 April 2015
- Lt. Gen. Bobby Mathews, PVSM, AVSM**, VSM – 1 May 2015 to 28 February 2017
- Lt. Gen. B.S. Sahrawat, SM – 28 February 2017 to 2019
- Lt. Gen. Rana Pratap Kalita 2019 to 2023
- Lt.Gen. Ram Chander Tiwari

January 2024 - till date

== See also ==
- Kumaon
- Kumauni People
- List of Regiments of the Indian Army
- Garhwal Rifles
