= Sarwate =

Sarwate is a surname. Notable people with the surname include:

- A. K. Sarwate (born 1945), Indian military officer
- Aditya Sarwate (born 1989), Indian cricketer
- Chandu Sarwate (1920–2003), Indian cricketer
- Vasant Sarwate (1927–2016), Indian cartoonist
- Vinayak Sitaram Sarwate (1884–1972), Indian freedom fighter
