= James Noel Thomson =

British Army general (1888–1979)

Major-General James Noel Thomson CB DSO MC
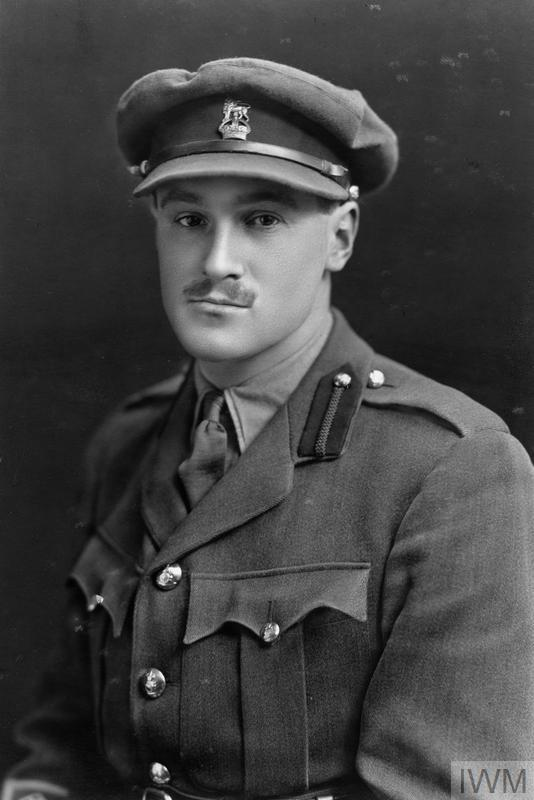
- Captain Thomson in 1918
- Born: 25 December 1888
- Died: 3 May 1979 (aged 90)
- Military career
- Allegiance: United Kingdom
- Branch: British Army
- Service years: 1909–1946
- Rank: Major-General
- Unit: Royal Field Artillery
- Commands: 6th Indian Infantry Division (1941–43)
- Conflicts: First World War; Second World War
- Awards: Companion of the Order of the Bath; Distinguished Service Order; Military Cross; Mentioned in Despatches (3)

Major-General James Noel Thomson, CB, DSO, MC (25 December 1888 – 3 May 1979) was a British Army officer who served during the First and Second World Wars.

== Military career ==
Born on 25 December 1888, James Noel Thomson was educated at Fettes College, and later attended the Royal Military Academy, Woolwich, from where he was commissioned into the Royal Field Artillery in 1909. He served in France from 9 September 1914, mostly on the Staff, during the First World War, being awarded the Military Cross and, in 1917, the Distinguished Service Order, in addition to being mentioned in despatches three times.

Thomson remained in the army during the interwar period, where he served as adjutant at the Royal Military College, Sandhurst, from 1919 to 1920, which was followed shortly after by his attendance at the Staff College, Camberley from 1920 to 1921 and received a brevet promotion to lieutenant colonel on 1 January 1929.

He attended the Imperial Defence College in 1932.

He was placed on half-pay on 10 October 1937.

As part of Iraqforce (Paiforce), Major-General Thomson commanded the Indian 6th Infantry Division during Anglo-Soviet invasion of Iran in 1941. He retired a colonel (honorary major general) on 14 August 1946.

== Family ==
Thomson was the son of Sarah Elizabeth (née Stuart) and James Thomson, Iron founder of Old Machar. In 1929 he married Lorna Carmen Buck at Shimla, daughter of Anne Margaret (née Jennings) and Sir Edward John Buck, a Special Correspondent of Reuter's Press Agency and author of Simla, Past and Present.

== Bibliography ==
- Smart, Nick (2005). Biographical Dictionary of British Generals of the Second World War. Barnesley: Pen & Sword. ISBN 1844150496.
