= Roger Le Fleming =

British Indian Army general (1895–1962)

General Roger Eustace Le Fleming CB, OBE, MC (20 April 1895 – 9 May 1962) was an officer in the British Indian Army during World War I and World War II. He was born at Tonbridge in Kent in 1895, the second son of John and Ethel Le Fleming. Le Fleming was educated at Tonbridge School, where his father was an Army tutor, and joined Royal Military College, Sandhurst in September 1913.

He was commissioned onto the Unattached List of Indian Army in August 1914. He served in France and Belgium with a British Army regiment March to September 1915. He then joined his Indian Army unit, the 102nd Grenadiers in November 1915. He served in Mesopotamia between November 1915 and June 1917 and then in Palestine from December 1917 to November 1918. During the war he was wounded and earned the Military Cross.

He served in Somaliland during the 1920 operations and was mentioned in despatches in the London Gazette 29 November 1920.

He was appointed an instructor at the Indian Military Academy from July 1932 to January 1936.

He served on the North West Frontier 1936–37.

He was promoted Lieutenant-Colonel and commanding officer of the 2nd battalion, 4th Bombay Grenadiers February 1938.

He was appointed temporary Brigadier 1 August 1941.

As part of Paiforce (formerly Iraqforce), Brigadier Le Fleming commanded the 24th Indian Infantry Brigade attached to the Indian 8th Infantry Division during the Anglo-Soviet invasion of Persia. After 11 September 1941, the 24th Indian Infantry Brigade was attached to the Indian 6th Infantry Division.

He was promoted Colonel as of 26 July 1943 with seniority from 14 February 1941.

In December 1943 he was appointed an Officer of the Order of the British Empire for 'distinguished services in Persia and Iraq' as a temporary Brigadier, Indian Army.

From 1944 to 1948 Le Fleming commanded the Waziristan District in India in the rank of Major-General. He was responsible for the implementation of Operation Curzon, the withdrawal of Indian and Pakistani regular army troops from Waziristan after independence on 14 August 1947, a file of his personal papers are held by the National Army Museum, London.

In June 1947 he was appointed a Companion of the Order of the Bath as a Colonel (temporary Major-General), Indian Army.

He retired from the Indian Army on 5 June 1948 a Colonel and was granted the honorary rank of Major-General. He died in 1962.

== See also ==
- Iraqforce
