= Ranikhet =

- Town
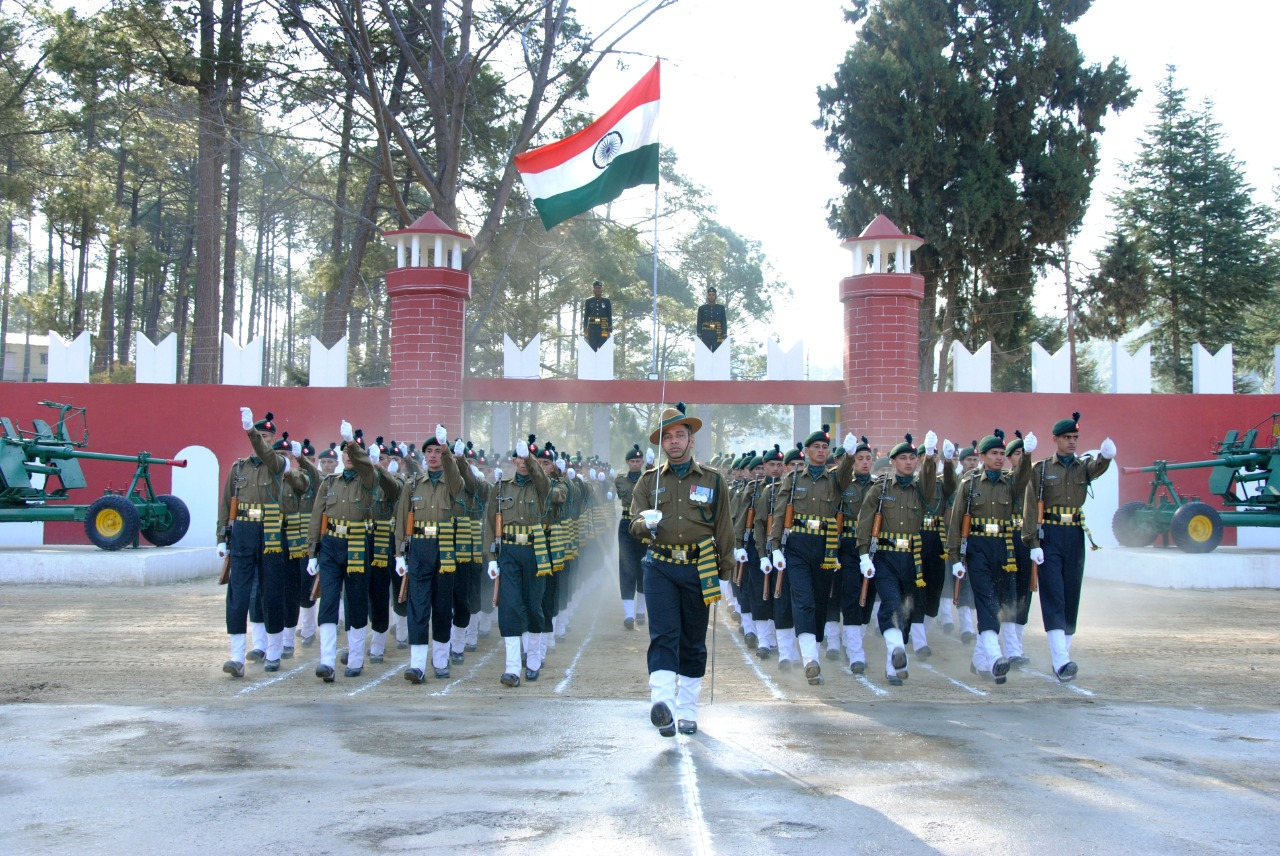
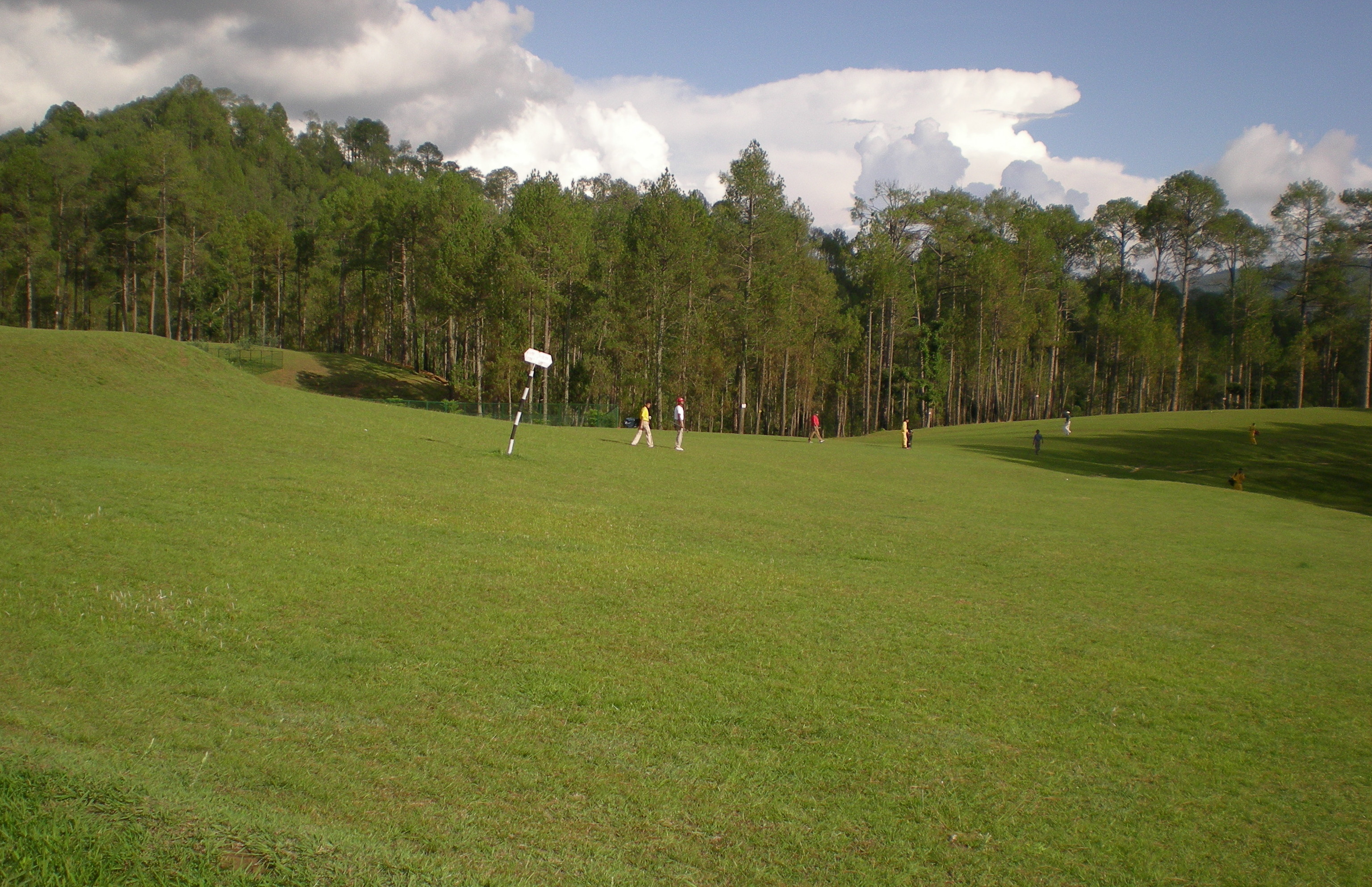
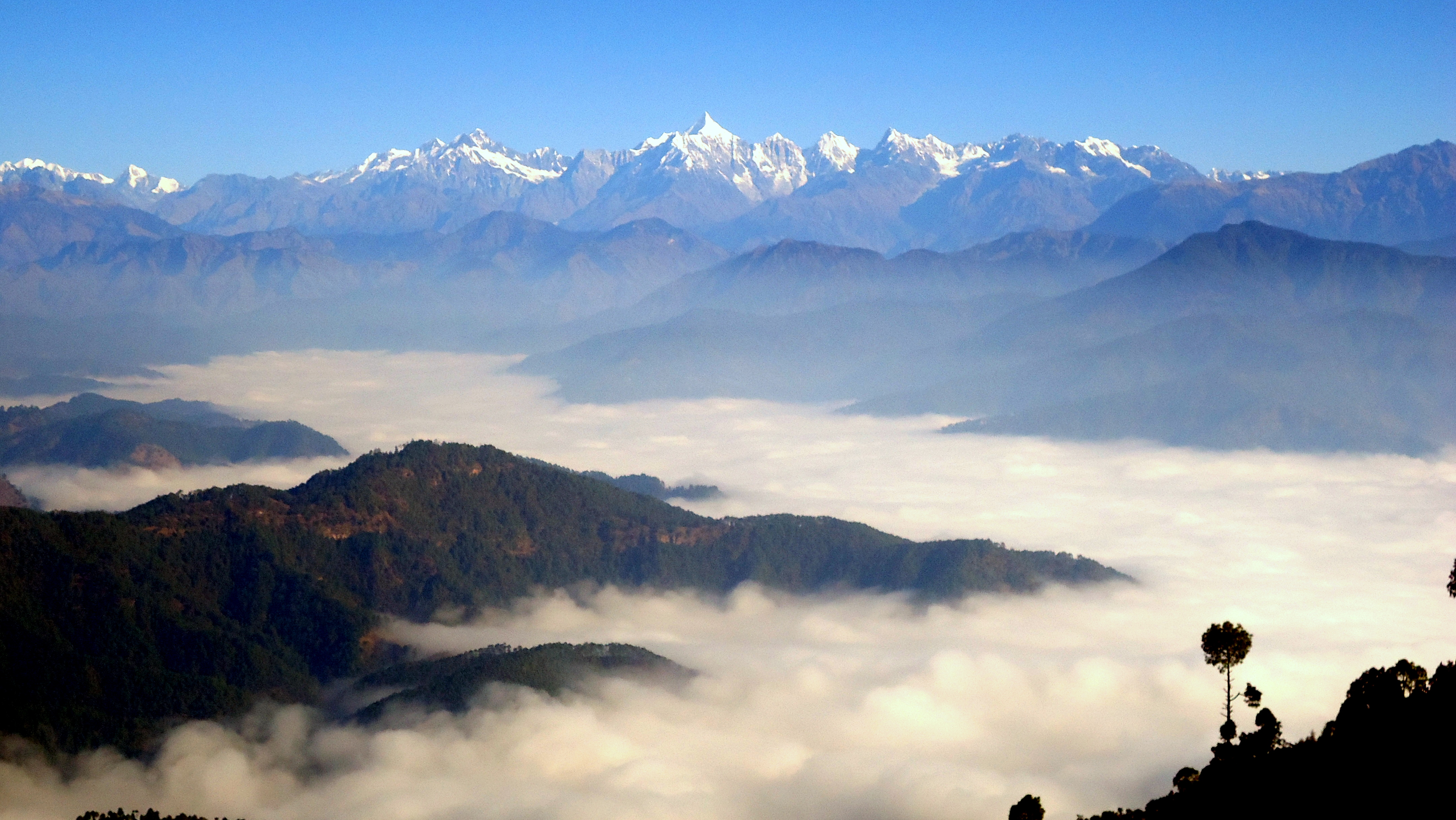
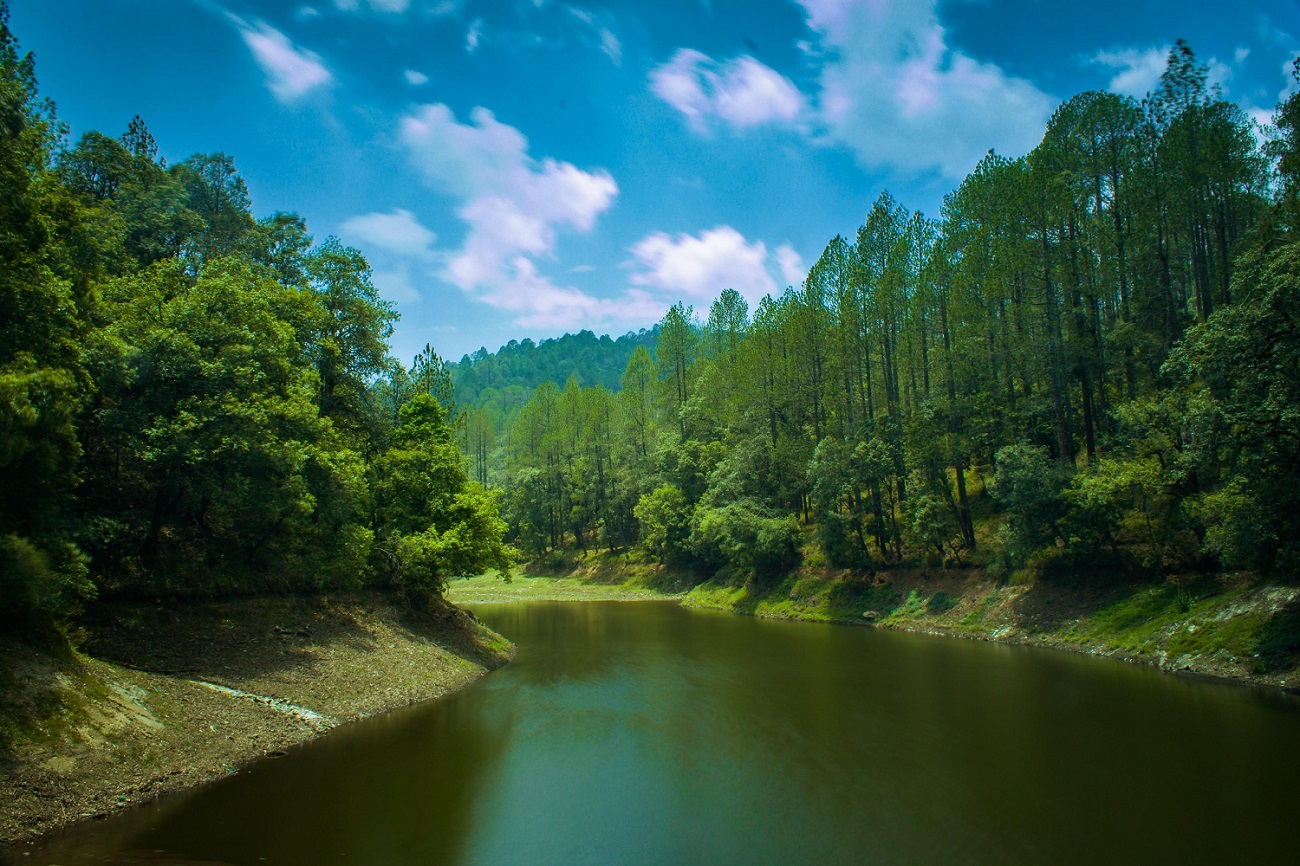
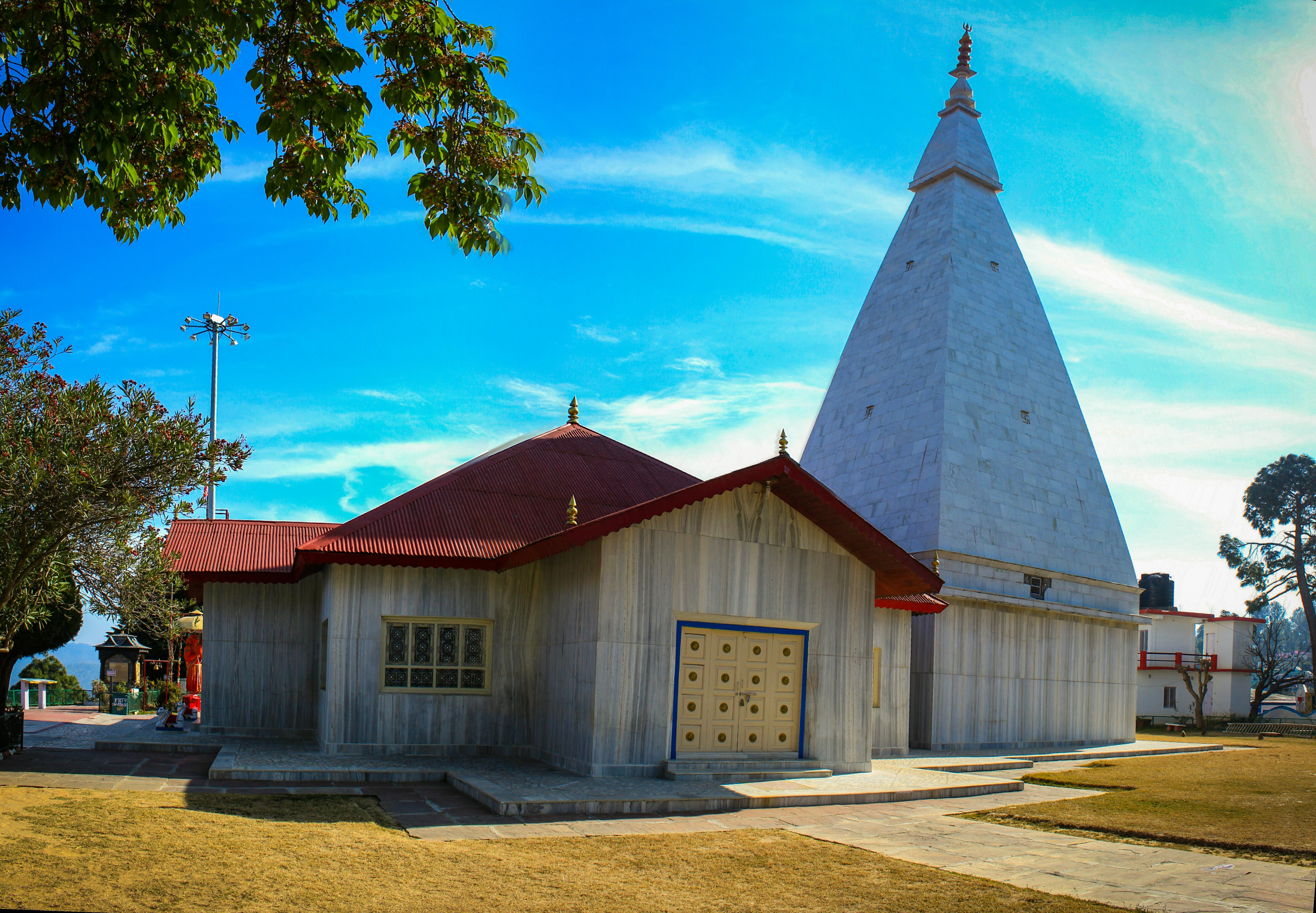
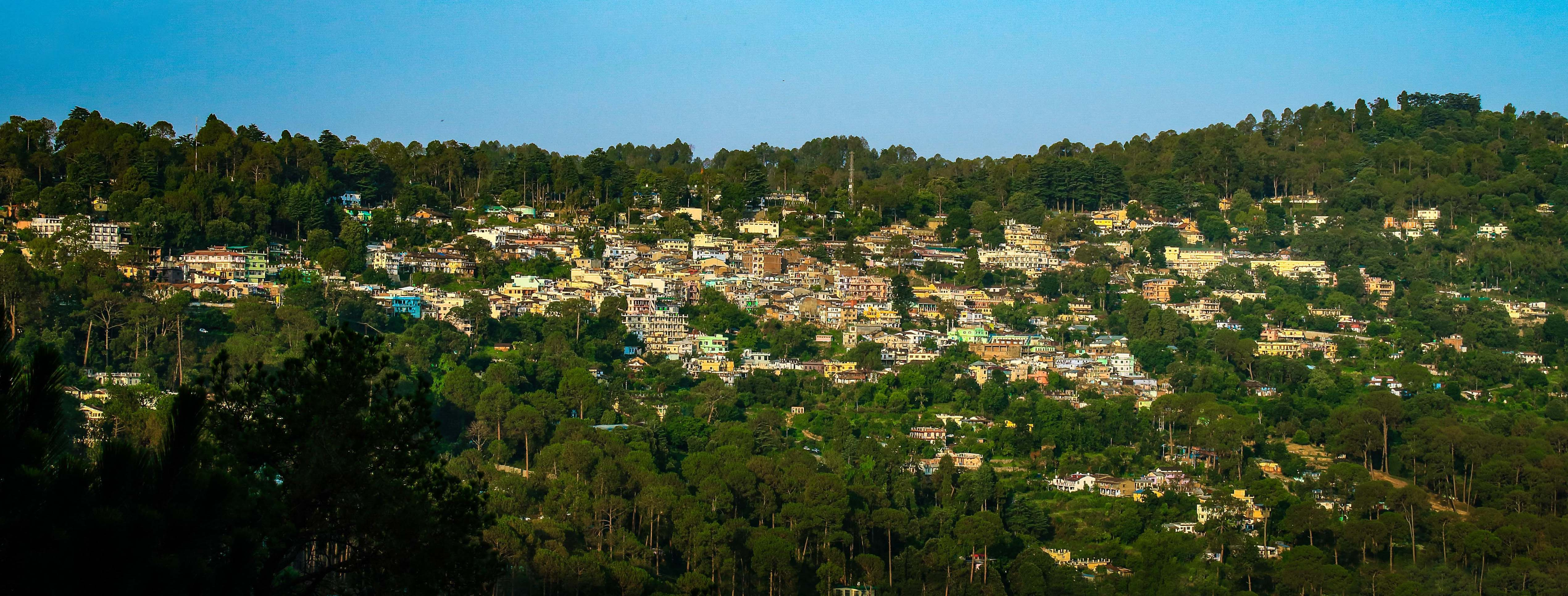
- Left to right; top to bottom: passing-out parade at KRC, golf course, Himalayan view, Bhalu Dam Lake at Chaubatia, Haidakhan temple at Chiliyanaula and Ranikhet skyline
- Nickname: Ranikhet
- Location in Uttarakhand, India Ranikhet (India)
- Coordinates: 29.65°N 79.42°E
- Country: India
- State: Uttarakhand
- District: Almora
- Elevation: 1,869 m (6,132 ft)

Population (2011)
  - Total: 18,886

Languages
  - Official: Hindi, Kumaoni
  - Native: Kumaoni
- Time zone: UTC+5:30 (IST)
- Vehicle registration: UK-20
- Website: uk.gov.in

Ranikhet (Kumaoni: Rānikhèt) is a hill station and cantonment town, near Almora Town in Almora district in the Indian state of Uttarakhand. It is the home of the Military Hospital, Kumaon Regiment (KRC) and Naga Regiment and is maintained by the Indian Army.

Ranikhet is at an altitude of 1,869 metres (6,132 ft) above sea level, within sight of the western peaks of the Himalayas. Ranikhet is a Class IV town with a civic status of a Cantonment board.

== History ==
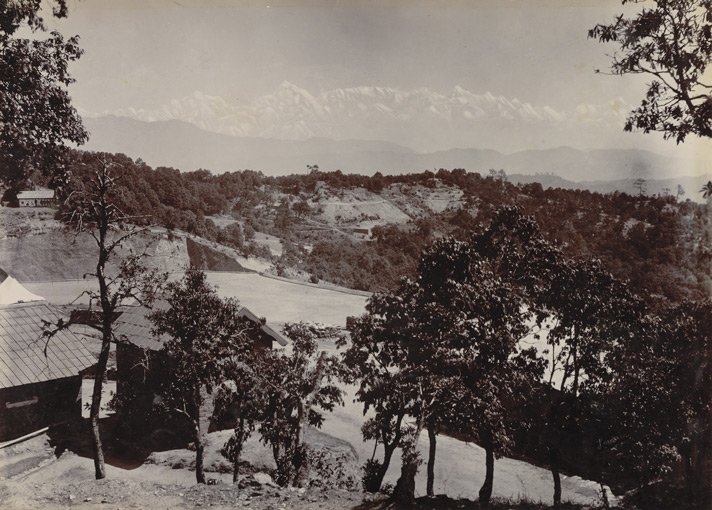
Ranikhet Polo Ground, c.1895

Ranikhet, which means Queen's Meadow in Kumaoni, gets its name from a local legend, which states that it was here, that Raja Sudhardev, a Katyuri ruler, won the heart of his queen, Rani Padmini, who subsequently chose the area for her residence, giving it the name, Ranikhet, though no palace exists in the area.

Ranikhet had been under Nepalese rule after the Nepalese invasion of Kumaon and Doti in 1790, and the Kumaonis won it under the leadership of their able General Kashi Nath Adhikari – after whom the small town of Kashipur was named (which at one point of time was the gateway to the hills and is now an educational and institutional hub) – with the help of British at around 1816 and is a part of India now.

After the conquest of Almora on 3 May 1815, when Kumaon had been handed over to the British by the Gorkhas, the soldiers and officers of the British army started to live in Hawalbagh. It continued till 1839, when the army offices were shifted to Almora Cantonment and the troops were stationed at Lohaghat and Pithoragarh so as to enable them to effectively monitor the Indo-Nepal Border. However, a local rebellion in 1846 resulted in the removal of military camp from Lohaghat and the troops were transferred back to Hawalbagh where they remained stationed until the establishment of another permanent Cantonment at Ranikhet.

Between 1830 and 1856, various European groups acquired land in the region in hope of establishing tea gardens in the district. One of them was the Troupe family, that bought the land from the villagers of Chaubatia, Holm Khet and Upat. In 1868, this site was selected for the residence of British soldiers, and the following year a cantonment was formed here after acquiring land from the villagers of Sarna, Kotli and Tana on a compensation of Rs 13,024. All the properties of the Troupe family were also acquired in the same year, except for the Holm estate, which was not incorporated into the cantonment until 1893.

In 1869, the British established the headquarters of the Kumaon Regiment as well as pargana Pali here and used the station as a retreat from the heat of the Indian summer. The treasury was opened here on 1 April 1869 and a Cantonment Committee was formed in 1871. A police station was also established in the city in 1869–70. The forests around Ranikhet were declared reserved forests in 1873. These forests had been brought under an action plan by 1887, although they continued to be managed under then-prevalent cantonment laws and regulations until 1915. Under these rules grazing and cutting of grass and burning of forests without permission were forbidden. On 3 December 1915, a portion of the cantonment was notified as a reserve forest under the Indian Forest Act of 1878.

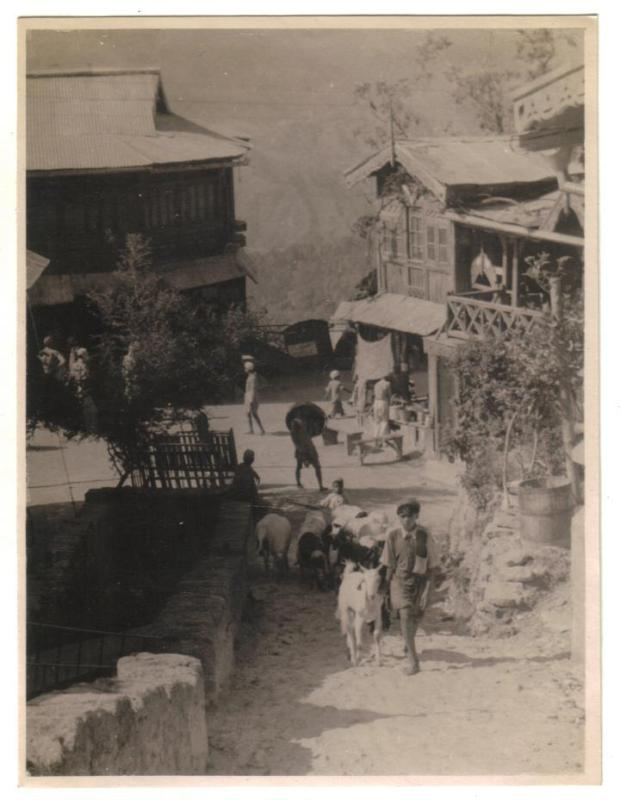
Entrance to Ranikhet Bazaar, c. 1946

At one time during British Raj, it was also proposed as the summer headquarters of Government of India, in lieu of Shimla. In 1900, it had a summer population of 7,705, and its corresponding winter population was measured in 1901 as 3,153 The headquarters of Pali Tehsil were established in Ranikhet in 1913, and the tehsil itself was later renamed as Ranikhet Tehsil.

A demand to bifurcate the Almora district to form a separate Ranikhet district started to gain popularity soon after the independence of India. Movements for Ranikhet district had begun by the 1960s, and these movements had grown, both in number and scale, by 1985. In 1987, a committee headed by Venkat Ramani, the President of the Uttar Pradesh Revenue Council recommended the district and then two years later, in 1989, the Eighth Finance Commission gave its financial approval to the district. Even after this, when the district was not formed, a movement started again in 1993–94, after which a CO and ADM were appointed in Ranikhet; the latter was soon removed.

In 2004 & 2005 people again agitated for the demand of a separate district. In 2007, an official proposal for formation of Ranikhet district was sent to the state government by the administration. According to this proposal, six blocks, five tehsils, 1309 revenue villages, 59 justice panchayats and 120 patwari areas were to be included in Ranikhet district. The proposed district was to have a population of 3,40,456 according to the 2001 census, and would be spread over an area of 13,735.740 hectares. In 2010 another mass movement was led by advocates. This agitation lasted for eight months, and after this, the then Chief Minister of Uttarakhand, Ramesh Pokhriyal announced the creation of the Ranikhet district which would include the Ranikhet, Salt, Bhikiasain, Dwarahat, and Chaukhutia tehsils of Almora district in 2011. However, the district never came into existence because no gazette notification was ever issued.

== Geography and climate ==
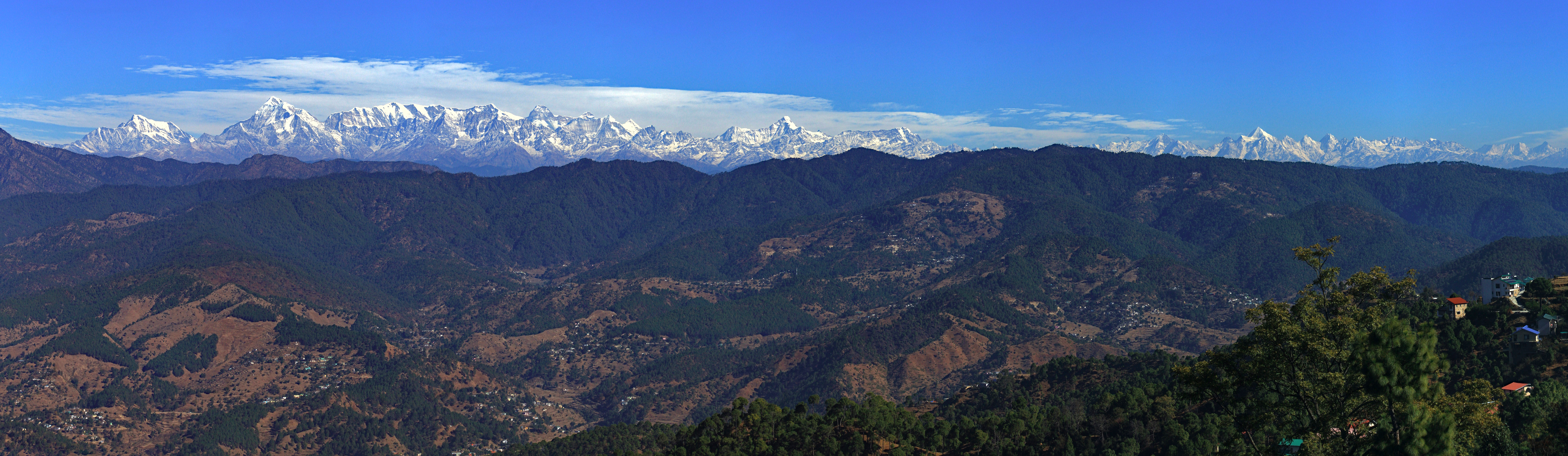
A panoramic view of the Kumaon Himalayas from Ranikhet, showing Trisul (7,120 m (23,360 ft)), Nanda Devi (7,817 m (25,646 ft)), Nanda Kot (6,861 m (22,510 ft)), Panchachuli (6,904 m (22,651 ft)) and other giant peaks.

Ranikhet Cantonment is spread over a total area of 4,176.031 acres, of which 2,580.135 acres is Reserve Forest area, 920.328 acres is Station area and 675,568 acres is Military area. The cantonment is spread across two ridges, the first, called the Ranikhet ridge, is situated at an elevation of 5,983 ft (1,824 m) and the second, the Chaubatia ridge, is at an elevation of 6,942 ft (2,116 m). The Ranikhet Cantonment Board - a 14 membered board formed under the Cantonment Board Act of 1924 - looks after the administration of the town. Ranikhet is a first class cantonment, and is divided into 7 wards for administrative functions. Of the total 14 members in Ranikhet Cantonment Board, 7 are elected from these wards.

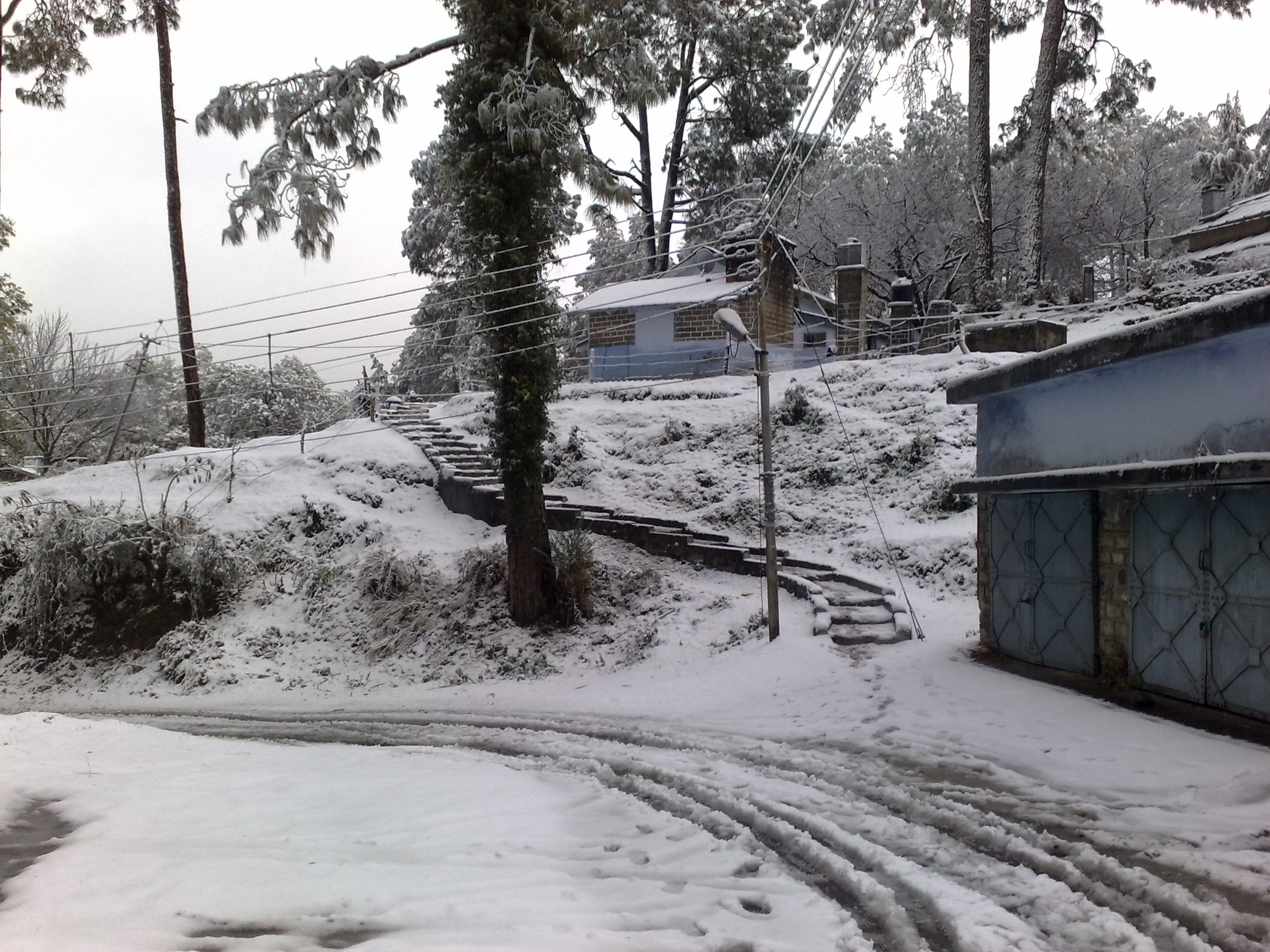
Ranikhet receives snowfall during winters.

Ranikhet has an average elevation of 1,869 m (6,132 ft) at a distance of 50 km (31 mi) from Almora and 60 km (37 mi) from Nainital. Administratively, the town is a part of Almora district; located to the west of district headquarters. It houses the headquarters of the Ranikhet tehsil and Ranikhet sub-division. The western narrow strips and eastern part of Ranikhet are comparatively high and covered with a dense forest mainly of pine.

Ranikhet is nestled in the sylvan surroundings inhabited by pine (Pinus roxburghii), oak (Quercus), buransh (Rhododendron arboreum) and deodar (Deodar Cedar) forests that host a large variety of fauna, such as leopards, rhesus monkeys, pine martens, Himalayan langur, dhole, rabbits, barking deer, sambar, and more. Exotic plants of Ranikhet include Ginkgo biloba and saffron.

Ranikhet becomes very cold in the winters and remains moderate in summers, and is best enjoyed from March to October. Ranikhet gets snowfall in the winter season, mainly in the months of December, January and February. But in the rest of the months the weather of Ranikhet remains pleasant.

Climate data for Ranikhet
Month	Jan	Feb	Mar	Apr	May	Jun	Jul	Aug	Sep	Oct	Nov	Dec	Year
Mean daily maximum °C (°F)	11.1 (52.0)	13.1 (55.6)	17.4 (63.3)	22.2 (72.0)	25.4 (77.7)	24.6 (76.3)	21.5 (70.7)	21.0 (69.8)	21.0 (69.8)	19.7 (67.5)	16.8 (62.2)	13.5 (56.3)	18.9 (66.1)
Daily mean °C (°F)	6.4 (43.5)	8.0 (46.4)	11.9 (53.4)	16.2 (61.2)	19.5 (67.1)	19.8 (67.6)	18.2 (64.8)	17.8 (64.0)	17.3 (63.1)	14.9 (58.8)	11.6 (52.9)	8.5 (47.3)	14.2 (57.5)
Mean daily minimum °C (°F)	1.8 (35.2)	2.9 (37.2)	6.4 (43.5)	10.3 (50.5)	13.7 (56.7)	15.0 (59.0)	15.0 (59.0)	14.7 (58.5)	13.6 (56.5)	10.1 (50.2)	6.5 (43.7)	3.6 (38.5)	9.5 (49.0)
Average rainfall mm (inches)	76 (3.0)	56 (2.2)	58 (2.3)	26 (1.0)	58 (2.3)	209 (8.2)	532 (20.9)	431 (17.0)	241 (9.5)	102 (4.0)	7 (0.3)	27 (1.1)	1,823 (71.8)
Source: Climate-Data.org

== Demographics ==
Historical population
Year	Pop.	±%
1881	5,984	—
1901	3,246	−45.8%
1911	5,781	+78.1%
1921	3,632	−37.2%
1931	3,772	+3.9%
1941	4,894	+29.7%
1951	8,937	+82.6%
1961	10,642	+19.1%
1971	13,917	+30.8%
1981	18,190	+30.7%
1991	16,874	−7.2%
2001	19,055	+12.9%
2011	18,886	−0.9%
Source: Census of India

The Cantonment Town of Ranikhet has a population of 19,049 persons. 16271 persons in Ranikhet are literates (10206 Male and 6065 Female). The literacy rate in Ranikhet town is significantly ahead of others in the district. Female Literacy is 91.18 percent. In 1881, when the first edition of The Imperial Gazetteer of India was published, Ranikhet had a population of 5,984, and the city was home to 3,313 Hindus, 1,090 Muslims, and 1,573 Europeans.

The spoken language by natives is Kumaoni.

== Tourism ==
The Ranikhet Cantonment area is home to several tourist places. The KRC Museum, maintained by the Kumaon Regiment of the Indian Army, has a collection of pictures and aretfacts, mainly focusing on the contributions of the Regiment during the World wars, Sino-Indian War, Indo-Pakistani wars of 1965 & 1971, the Kargil war and Operation Pawan. It has on display the various weapons captured, flags of enemies captured by the army and a LTTE boat captured during Operation Pawan. The museum also showcases medals and uniforms of the soldiers and stories of the First and the Second Param Vir Chakra winners, and all the Army Generals who belonged to the Kumaon Regiment. Other tourist places in the cantonment include the Ashiyana Park, which was specially designed & developed for children. The Mankameshwar Temple, constructed and maintained by the Kumaon regiment, is located in the middle of the cantonment. Opposite the temple is a Gurudwara and a Shawl factory. The Rani Jheel, located near Nar Singh Stadium, is a man-made lake, where tourists can enjoy boat rides. St. Bridget's Church is an old church in Ranikhet town.

The Ranikhet Golf Course, located at Upat Kalika is one of the highest golf courses of Asia. It is situated at a distance of 5 kilometres (3 mi) from main Ranikhet City. Ranikhet Golf Course is a 9-hole course making it one of the prime attractions of Ranikhet. The green meadow of the golf course at such high altitude is awe-inspiring. The golf club provides membership plans for outsiders as well.

Situated 4 km from Ranikhet at Chilianaula, the Haidakhan Temple, constructed by Haidakhan Babaji, is dedicated to Lord Shiva. The Jhula Devi temple is situated at a distance of 7 kilometres (4 mi) from the town of Ranikhet near Chaubatia. The temple is dedicated to Maa Durga, who is believed to have protected the villagers from wild animals, leopards and tigers, that roamed in the dense jungles around the temple. The temple is festooned with numerous bells owing to the tradition of offering a bell to the goddess upon fulfilment of one's wishes. Located in the vicinity of Jhula Devi temple is the Rama Mandir, dedicated to lord Rama. The Rama Mandir has a monastery where students are taught ancient vedas along with vedic and modern mathematics. The Binsar Mahadev Temple is situated close to a stream amidst beautiful pine and deodar trees.

Other nearby places include Chaubatia, Tarikhet, Syalikhet and Majkhali. Chaubatia, located about 10 kilometres (6 mi) from Ranikhet, is famous for its apple orchards. There are also plantations of apricots, peaches, chestnuts, and almonds. The Bhalu Dam, located near Chaubatia is a man-made lake that supplies drinking water to Ranikhet Town. Tarikhet is located at a distance of 8 kilometres (5 mi) from Ranikhet Cantt, and is well known for its Gandhi Kuti, and the temple of Golu Devata. Syalikhet is a scenic spot situated at a distance of 25 kilometres (16 mi) from Ranikhet. Syalikhet is located in the amidst green forest and apple orchards and is known for a temple of Syahi Devi. Majkhali is a picnic spot on the Ranikhet-Almora road. It is located at a distance of 12 km from Ranikhet and offers a close view of the snowy Himalayas with peaceful surroundings. It also holds 'melas' during festivals. Baburkhola village, which resembles a Scottish countryside, is at a distance of 5 km from Majhkali.

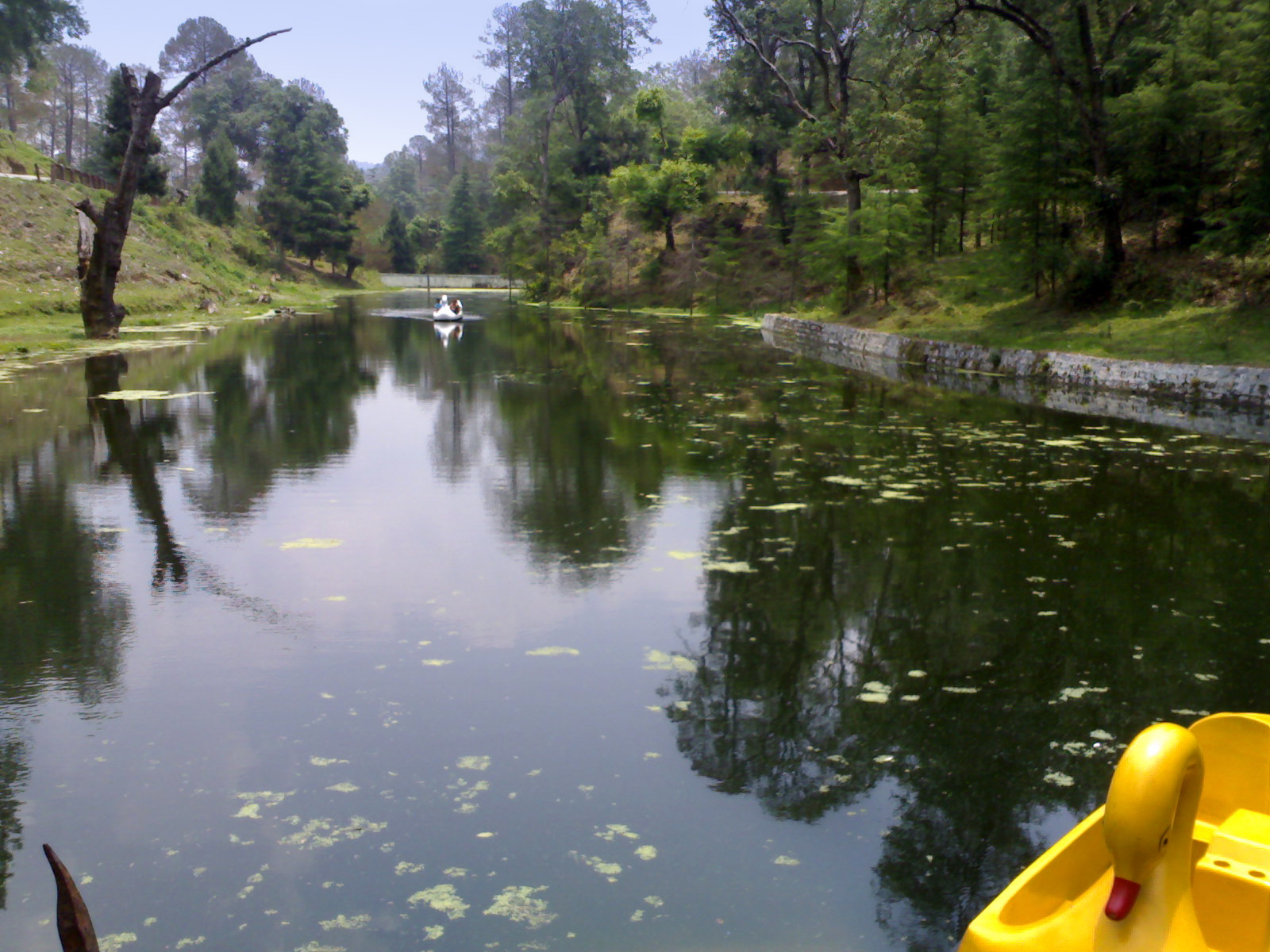
Rani Jheel

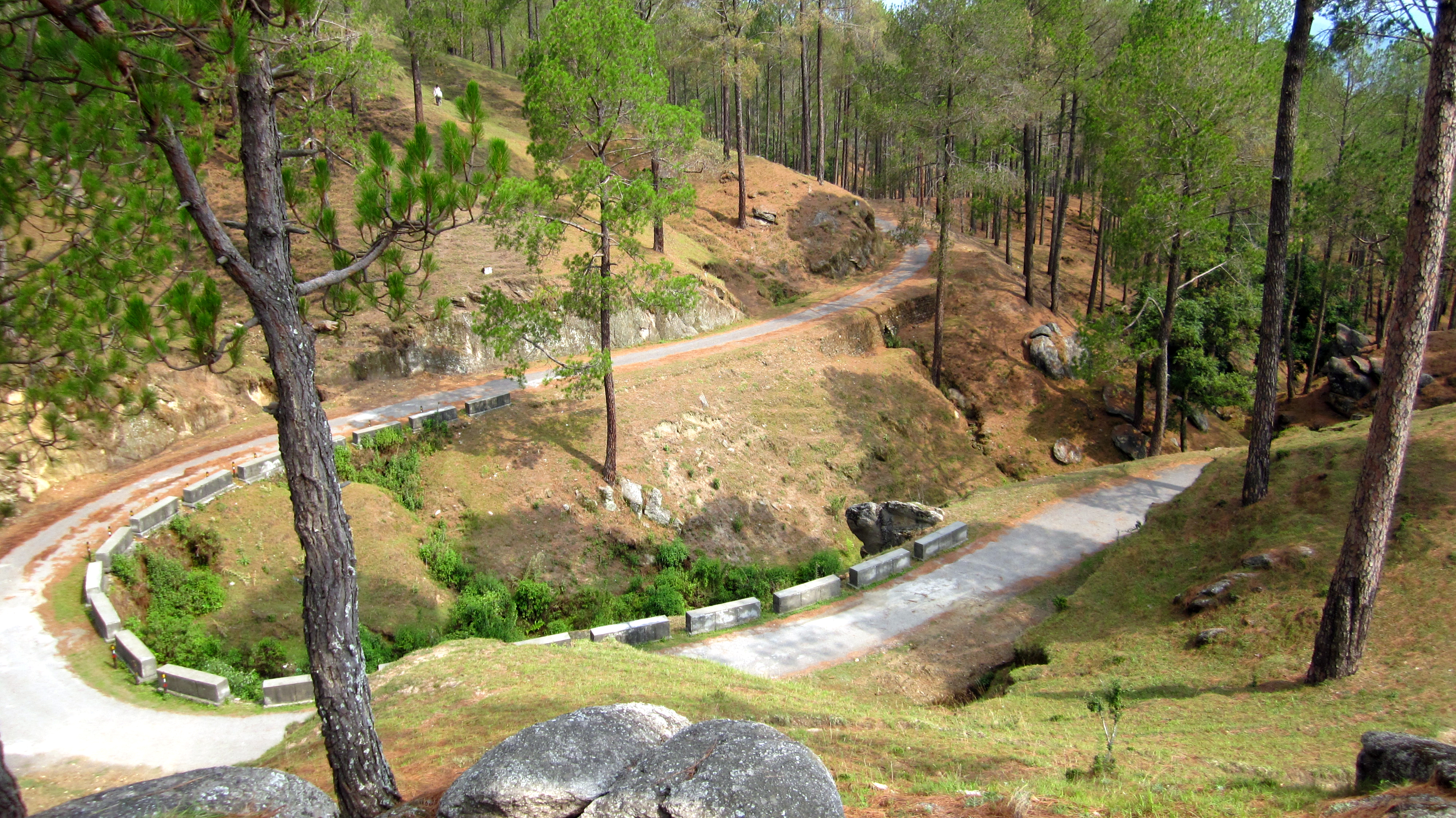
Sarna Garden road

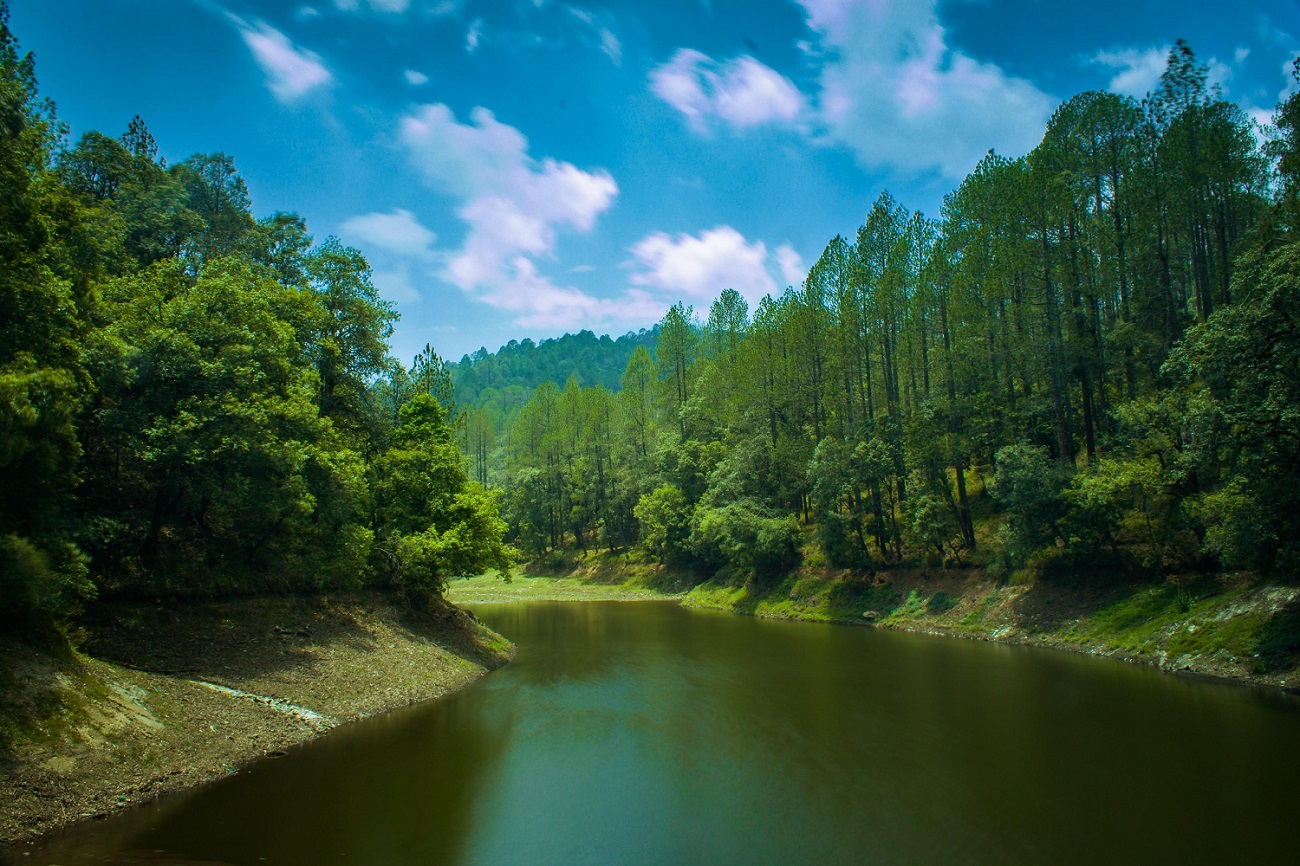
Bhalu Dam

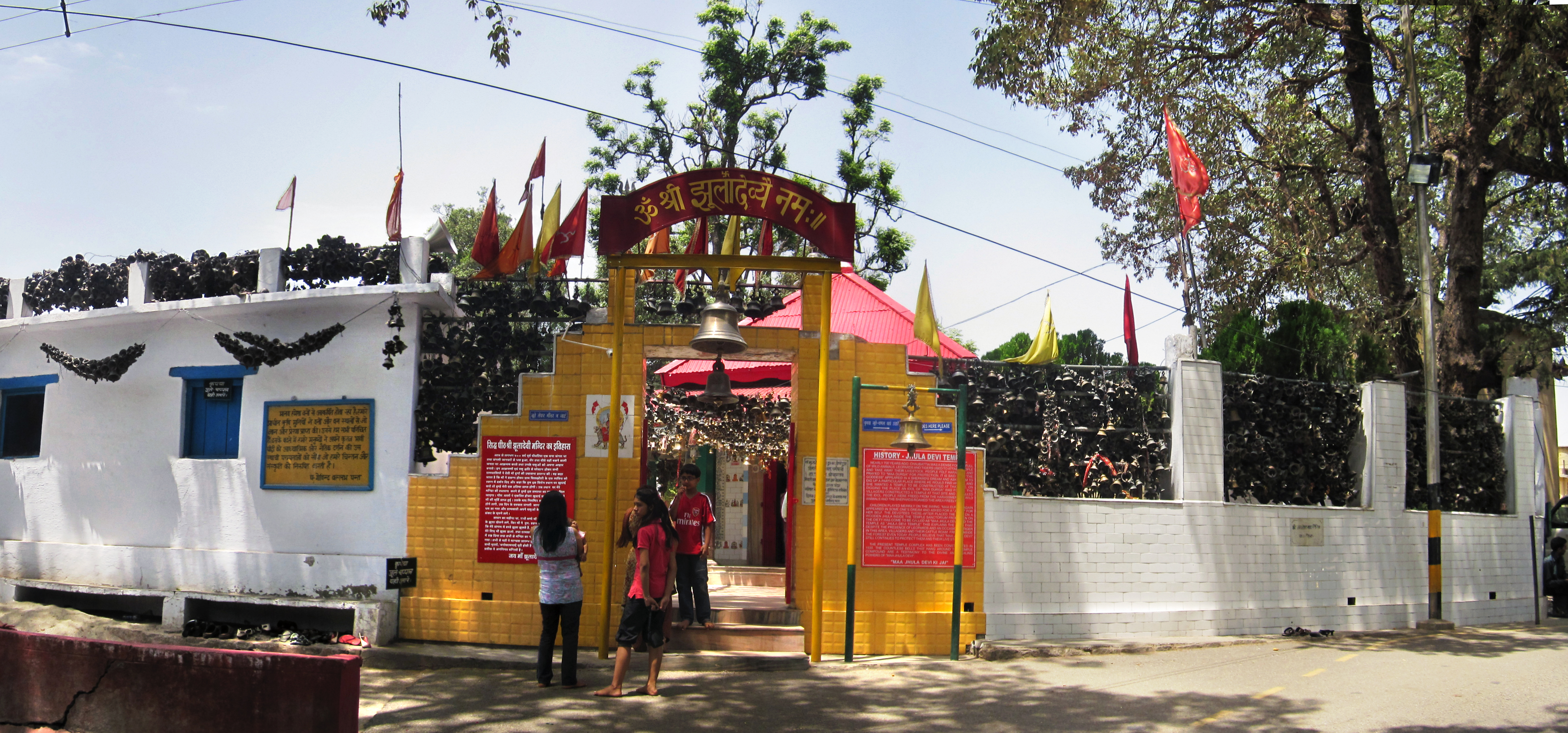
Jhula devi temple

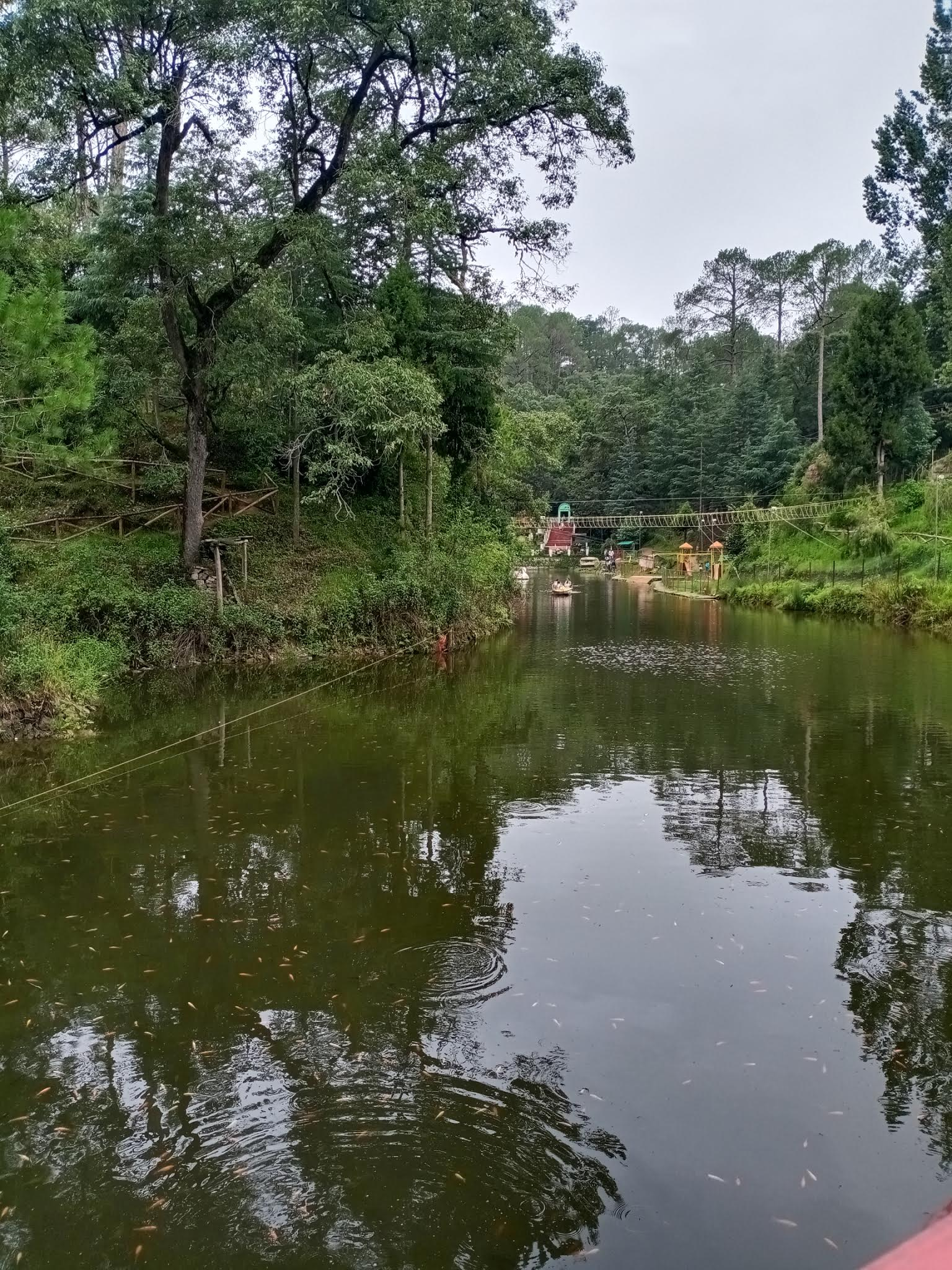
Rani Jheel

== Transport ==
Ranikhet is situated at a distance of 350 kilometres (217 mi) from Delhi, well connected by road and railway. The nearest railway station is Kathgodam, approximately 68 kilometres (42 mi) from Ranikhet (GMAPS) one can also use taxis from kathgodam & Haldwani railway stations towards Ranikhet at reasonable cost. Pantnagar Airport is the nearest airport. Nearest hill stations are Almora - 50 km, Nainital - 60 km. There are some more places nearby which can be visited like Chaubatia, Dwarahat, Kausani, Chaukhutia, Majhkhali, Naina Gaon, Jalali, Barakham, Doonagiri, Naithna, Masi and Pali.

== Ranikhet chicken disease ==
A poultry disease first discovered in Ranikhet, also known as Newcastle disease.

== Economy ==
Ranikhet's economy is based on the cantonment town and emerging tourism. Commodities manufactured in Ranikhet include sweet meats, jam and hosiery.

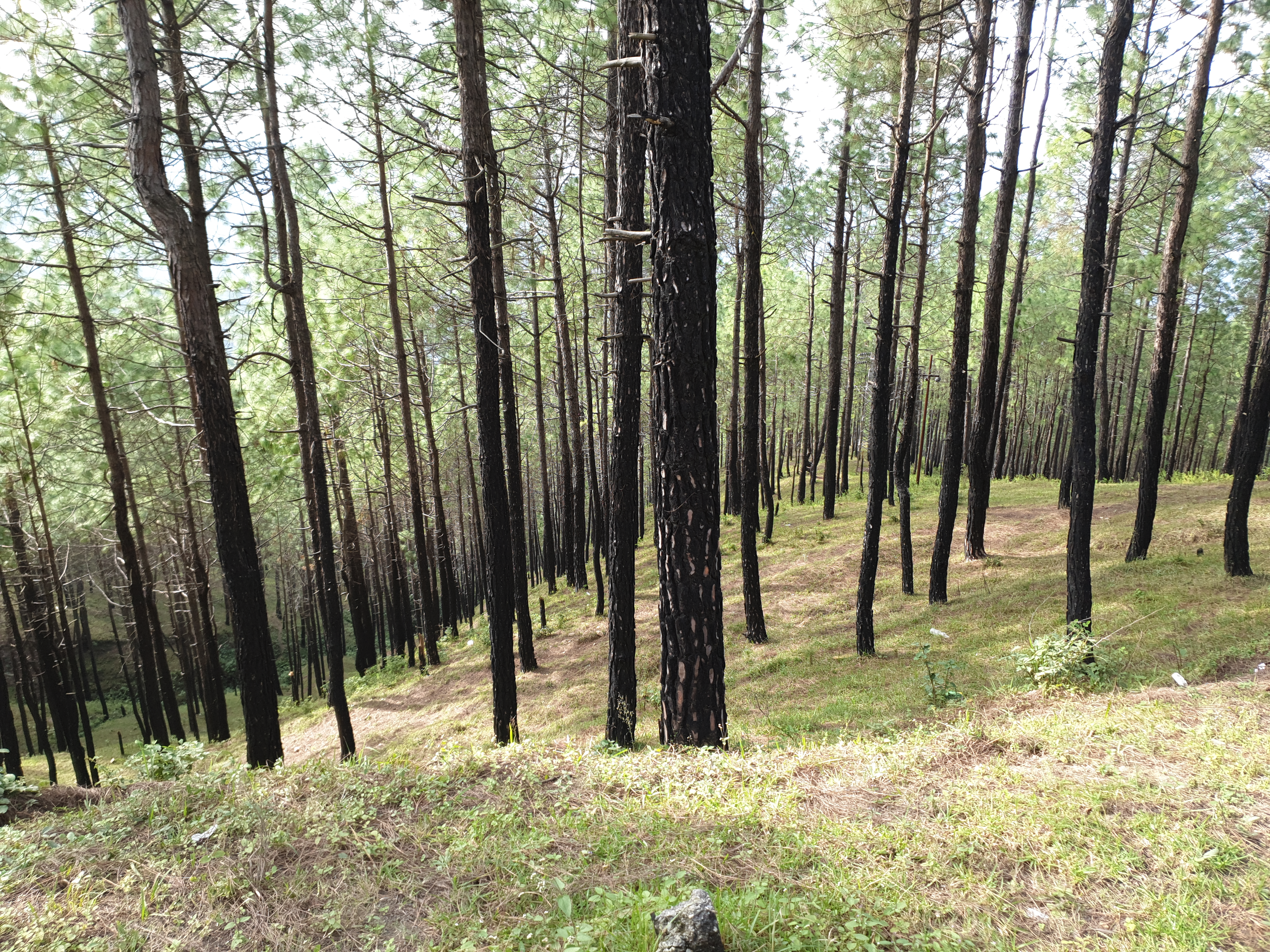
Rainkhet area as seen from the road near Golf Course, Ranikhet.

== Schools ==
Ranikhet Town has 11 Primary Schools, 7 Middle Schools, 4 Secondary Schools and 6 Senior Secondary schools. As per the Census of India (2011) one college

- Preparatory Public School Jhalori
- Ashok Hall Girls’ Residential School
- G D Birla Memorial School
- Mount Sinai School, Dhamizer, Ranikhet
- The Pleasant Valley School, Highland Korichina
- Shiv dutt paliwal government inter college (Pali)
- Kendriya Vidyalaya, Ranikhet
- Army Public School, Ranikhet
- National Inter college, Ranikhet
- Cantonment School, Ranikhet
- Canossa Convent School, Ranikhet
- Beershiva Sr. Sec. School, Ranikhet
- Ranikhet (Mission) Inter College
- Jodhamal school
- Government college Ranikhet

== Media ==
Ranikhet has an All India Radio Relay station known as Akashvani Ranikhet. It broadcasts on FM frequencies.
