= 6th Infantry Division (India) =

World War I-era army unit

The 6th Infantry Division is an infantry division of the Indian Army. It was a raised as a part of the Indian Army during World War II on 1 March 1941 in Secunderabad. On 11 September 1941 it was shipped to Iraq and later Iran. During 1942 and 1943 it was part of the Tenth Army. The division remained in the Middle East where it was disbanded on 15 October 1944 in Basra, Iraq. During World War II its commanders included Major-general James Noel Thomson, Major-general Arthur Holworthy, and Major-general B.H. Chappel.

== Component units as of 11 September 1941 ==
- 1st Duke of Yorks Own Skinners Horse
- 9th Indian Infantry Brigade
  - 2nd Battalion, The West Yorkshire Regiment
  - 3rd Battalion, 12th Frontier Force Regiment
  - 3rd Battalion, 5th Mahratta Light Infantry
- 10th Indian Infantry Brigade
  - 2nd Battalion, The Highland Light Infantry
  - 3rd Battalion, 18th Royal Garhwal Rifles
  - 4th Battalion, 10th Baluch Regiment
- 28th Field Regiment, Royal Artillery
- 20th Field Company, Indian Engineers
- 21st Field Company, Indian Engineers
- 44th Field Park Company, Indian Engineers

In addition, the 24th Indian Infantry Brigade was assigned or attached to the division at some time during World War II.

== 6th Mountain Division ==
After the Partition of India, the post-independence Indian Army reraised the 6th Division as the 6th Mountain Division in 1963. The division headquarters was initially at Naini Tal. The division is now headquartered at Bareilly and is part of the Central Command. The Garuda Division as it is known has been commanded amongst others by Maj Gen Siri Kanth Korla, PVSM, DSO, MC, and Maj Gen R Z Kabraji, AVSM, ADC. Kabraji succeeded Korla and was GOC from December 1966 to January 1969. Maj Gen (later Lt Gen) D K Chandorkar took over from Kabraji. The division later relocated to Bareilly.

The division took part in the 1965 and 1971 wars. It was moved to Kashmir in May 1999 during Op Vijay, however, it was not deployed for operations. In 2005, Major General Gur Iqbal Singh, the then division commander, was found to be involved in a corruption case. He was tried and dismissed for corruption in late 2006. At that time, Brigadier G. Illangovan commanded the 99 Mountain Brigade at Chaubatia and Brigadier D.S. Grewal commanded the 69 Mountain Brigade in Pithoragarh, both in Uttarakhand. Both brigadiers reported to Singh. As of June 2007, both brigadiers were accused of misdirection of monies.
