= Sydney B. Pope =

- Born: 9 February 1879
- Died: 1955 (aged 75–76)
- Military career
- Allegiance: United Kingdom
- Branch: British Indian Army
- Rank: Major General
- Awards: Companion of the Order of the Bath; Distinguished Service Order

Major General Sydney Buxton Pope CB DSO (9 February 1879 – 1955) was a British officer who served in the British Indian Army.

== Early life and education ==
Pope was born 9 February 1879 at Dacca, Bengal. He was educated St. Pauls School and Christ's College, Cambridge.

== Military career ==
Pope was commissioned as a second lieutenant in the 4th battalion, Royal Dublin Fusiliers on 12 July 1900. He transferred to the Royal Irish Regiment on 4 May 1901, and then to the British Indian Army on 8 April 1903. He was promoted to lieutenant on 4 August 1903 while attached the 113th Infantry.

He transferred to the 58th Vaughan's Rifles (Frontier Force) on 25 February 1904. He served on the campaign against the Mohmands on the North West Frontier during 1908. He was promoted to captain on 4 May 1910. He served as aide-de-camp to the commander of the 4th (Quetta) Division from 5 December 1913 to 23 February 1914. From February 1914, he was at the Quetta Staff College.

Pope served during the First World War. He served mostly on the staff in France and Palestine. For his service during WWI, he was awarded the Distinguished Service Order (DSO), the French Legion d'honneur and the Egyptian Order of the Nile, 3rd class. He was promoted to major on 4 May 1916.

He was appointed Brevet Lt-Col 1 January 1919 and Brevet Colonel 3 May 1921. Appointed Deputy Adjutant and Quartermaster General for Baluch District 1 July 1922 to 31 July 1923 as a temporary Colonel.

Promoted Colonel 29 April 1924 with seniority from 3 May 1921.

Appointed temporary Brigadier Commanding 8th Indian Infantry Brigade from 4 July 1926 to 4 July 1930.

Promoted Major - General 29 October 1930 and awarded the Companion of the Order of the Bath the same year.

He was on the unemployed list from 18 October 1930 to 27 October 1931.

Appointed District Commander Waziristan District 16 November 1931 to 27 August 1934.

Appointed D. A. & Q. M. G., Southern Command 27 August 1934 to 27 August 1938.

Retired Major - General 27 August 1938.

He was appointed the Colonel of the 4/19 Hyderabad Regiment (late the 98th Infantry) from 28 August 1931 to 31 May 1949 and was the first colonel of the Kumaon Regiment.

He was appointed the Colonel of the 5/13 Frontier Force Rifles (late the 58th Vaughans Rifles) 24 February 1933.

In retirement he was appointed a King's Messenger, an appointment he relinquished on 27 June 1940.
