= Chaubatia =

Chaubattia
- City
- Country: India
- State: Uttarakhand
- District: Almora

Languages
  - Official: Hindi
  - Other: Kumaoni
- Time zone: UTC+5:30 (IST)
- PIN: 263651
- Telephone code: +91-5966

Chaubattia is a settlement in Almora district, in the state of Uttarakhand, northern India. It is located roughly 10 kilometres (6 mi) south of the cantonment town of Ranikhet. Chabattia is 1,800 metres (5,906 ft) above sea level, within sight of the western peaks of the Himalayas. Its name, in the Kumaoni language, means a common meeting point of four paths ("chau" meaning four and "bat" meaning path). It is named this way because of its location at the intersection of four places connects in front of Rawat Building: Bhargaon, Ranikhet, Dehrti and Pilkholi.

Chaubattia is best known as the location of a botanical garden and fruit orchard which are popular with tourists to the region. The gardens contain predominantly apple, peach, plum and apricot trees. It is also home to a government operated fruit and vegetable research centre, which owns and runs the fruit orchard.
