= A. K. Sarwate =

Avinash Sarwate
- Born: 2 February 1945 (age 81); Amravati, Maharashtra, India
- Military career
- Allegiance: India
- Branch: Indian Army
- Service years: 1964 – 2003
- Rank: Major General
- Unit: Infantry
- Commands: 5 Kumaon; 83 Infantry Brigade; 15 Infantry Division
- Conflicts: Indo-Pakistan War of 1965; Indo-Pakistan War of 1971; Kargil War
- Awards: Ati Vishisht Seva Medal

Major General Avinash Kesheo Sarwate (Marathi: अविनाश क. सरवटे; born 2 February 1945) was an alumnus of the National Defence Academy (India) and was commissioned into the Kumaon Regiment on 2 August 1964 as a second lieutenant posted to the 11th Battalion, Kumaon Regiment. He was transferred to the 16th Battalion, Kumaon Regiment, after serving for a year and a half with 11 Kumaon. He later commanded the 5th Battalion, Kumaon Regiment, as a lieutenant colonel.

Sarwate was the General Officer Commanding (GOC) the 15th Infantry (Panther) Division of the Indian Army and subsequently Assistant Director General of Military Training (ADGMT) at the Army Headquarters. Before retirement, he was the Commandant, Services Selection Board (South).

In March 2003 he received Ati Vishisht Seva Medal (AVSM).
