= 24th Indian Infantry Brigade =

- Active: 1941–1945
- Country: (British Raj) British India
- Allegiance: British Empire
- Branch: British Indian Army
- Type: Infantry
- Size: Brigade
- Engagements: World War II; Anglo-Iraqi War; Anglo-Soviet invasion of Iran

Commanders
- Notable commanders: Brigadier Roger Eustace Le Fleming

.

The 24th Indian Infantry Brigade was an infantry brigade formation of the Indian Army during World War II. The brigade was formed in February 1941, in India and at first assigned to the 10th Indian Infantry Division, and fought in the Anglo-Iraqi War. The brigade was transferred to the 8th Indian Infantry Division in June 1941, seeing service in the Anglo-Soviet invasion of Iran. The brigade remained in this theatre for the rest of the war as part of the 6th Indian Infantry Division. The current GOC is

== Formation ==
- 5th Battalion, 1st Punjab Regiment February to April 1941
- 2nd Battalion, 6th Rajputana Rifles April 1941 to January 1944 and March 1944 to July 1945
- The Kumaon Rifles April 1941 to February 1945
- 5th Battalion, 5th Mahratta Light Infantry April 1941 to January 1943
- 2nd Battalion, Royal Sussex Regiment April 1943 to July 1945
- 25th Battalion, Sikh Light Infantry January to March 1944 and January 1945 to July 1945
- 14th Battalion, 12th Frontier Force Regiment April 1944 to May 1945
- 2nd Battalion, Jammu and Kashmir Rifles September 1944 to August 1945
- Jodhpur Sardar Risala January to June 1945
- 14th Battalion, 5th Mahratta Light Infantry February to July 1945
- 1st Battalion, 10th Baluch Regiment June to August 1945
- 4th Battalion, 8th Punjab Regiment June to August 1945
- 87th Field Artillery Regiment Royal Artillery July to October 1942

== See also ==
- List of Indian Army Brigades in World War II
