= Indian Military Academy =

Military academy in Dehradun, India

- Insignia of the Indian Military Academy
- Former name: Armed Forces Academy
- Motto: Veerta aur Vivek
- Motto in English: Valour and Wisdom
- Type: Military Academy
- Established: 10 December 1932; 93 years ago
- Officer in charge: Lt. Gen. Nagendra Singh
- Commandant: Lt. Gen. Nagendra Singh
- Students: 1,650
- Location: Dehradun, Uttarakhand, India; 30.3320°N 77.9809°E
- Campus: 1,400 acres (5.7 km^{2}); Suburban
- Colours: Blood red and steel grey

The Indian Military Academy (IMA) is one of the oldest military academies in India, and trains officers for the Indian Army. Located in Dehradun, Uttarakhand, it was established in 1932 following a recommendation by a military committee set up under the chairmanship of General (later Field Marshal) Sir Philip Chetwode. From a class of 40 male cadets in 1932, IMA now has a sanctioned capacity of 1,650. Cadets undergo a training course varying between 3 and 16 months, depending on entry criteria. On completion of the course at IMA, cadets are permanently commissioned into the army as Lieutenants.

The academy, spread over 1,400 acres (5.7 km^{2}), houses the Chetwode Hall, Khetarpal Auditorium, Somnath Stadium, Salaria Aquatic Centre, Hoshiar Singh Gymnasium and other facilities that facilitate the training of cadets. Cadets in IMA are organized into a regiment with four battalions of four companies each. The academy's mission, to train future military leaders of the Indian Army, goes hand in hand with the character building enshrined in the IMA honour code, warrior code, and motto. Cadets take part in a variety of sports, adventure activities, physical training, drills, weapons training, and leadership development activities. Cadets have to learn and understand the philosophy of military assessment and selection following by three words Mansa, Vacha, and Karma - derived from Sanskrit indicates the cadet capabilities as a Psychologist, Interviewing Officer, and GTO – Group Testing Officer, respectively.

The academy's alumni include six recipients of India's highest military decoration, the Param Vir Chakra. Other achievements by alumni include 73 Military Crosses, 17 Ashoka Chakras, 84 Maha Vir Chakras and 41 Kirti Chakras. In 2017, Lieutenant Ummer Fayaz Parray was the 847th name to be engraved on the IMA War Memorial, which honours alumni of the academy who have fallen in the course of action. Up to 1 October 2019, the 87th Raising Day, (Note: Founding date) over 61,000 gentleman cadets had graduated and over 3,000 foreign cadets from over 30 other states, including Afghanistan, Singapore, Zambia, and Malaysia, had attended IMA for pre-commission training. Alumni have gone on to become Chief and Vice-Chief of Army Staff, Olympians, and politicians. Foreign alumni have also done well in their countries, going on to become chiefs of their respective military command posts, prime ministers, presidents, and politicians.

== History ==
=== Demands for an Indian military training academy ===
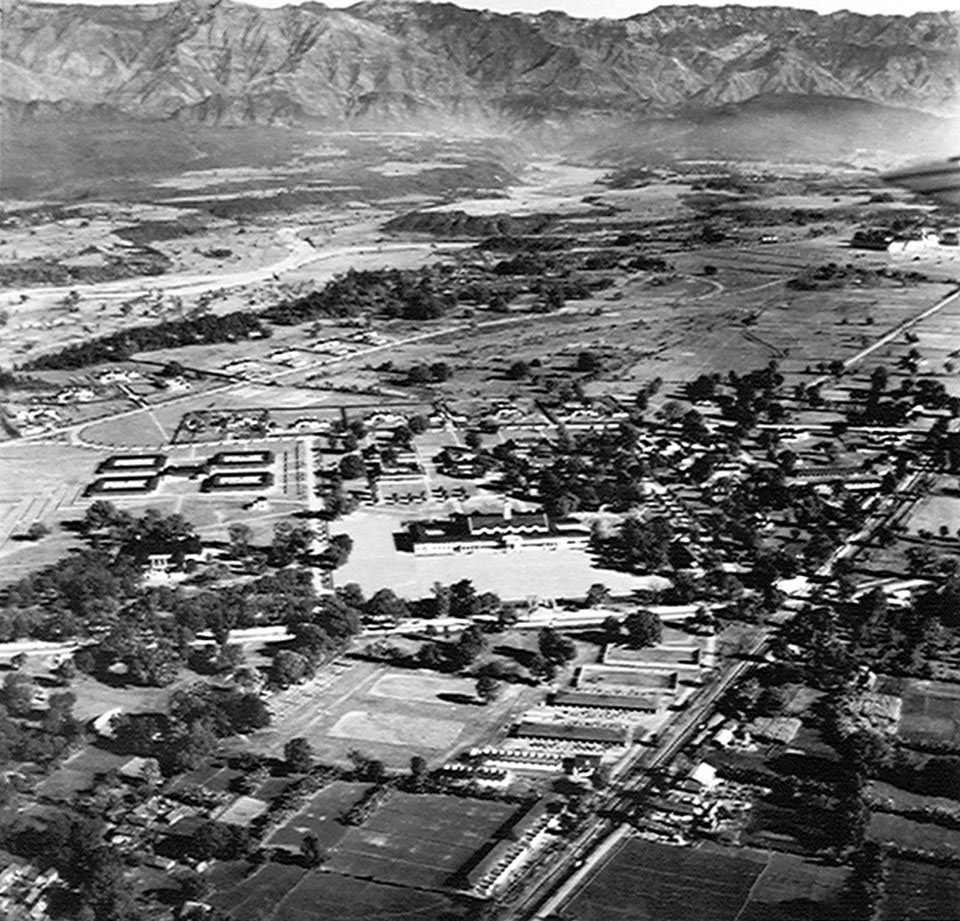
Aerial view of the academy in 1932.

During the Indian independence movement, Indian leaders recognised the need for a local military institution to meet the needs of an armed force loyal to sovereign India. The Indianisation of the officer cadre of the army began in 1901, but it was only for the elite, and after training they were not allowed into the regular army. The British Raj was reluctant to commission Indian officers or permit local officer training. In 1905, natives could only be officers of Indian troops and by rank were not equal to commissioned British officers. Up to the outbreak of the First World War, the highest rank to which a native soldier of India could rise was Subedar, a rank lower than the lowermost officer rank of Subaltern.

But following the Indian military performance in the First World War, the Montagu–Chelmsford Reforms facilitated the officer training of 10 Indian commissioned officers at the Royal Military College, Sandhurst. In 1922, the Prince of Wales Royal Indian Military College (now known as the Rashtriya Indian Military College or just RIMC) was set up in Dehradun to prepare young Indians for admission to Sandhurst. The Indianisation of the Army started with the commissioning of 31 Indian officers. Among this first batch of officers to be commissioned was Sam Hormusji Framji Jamshedji Manekshaw, who became the Chief of Army Staff of the Indian Army in 1969 and later the first Indian Field Marshal.

Despite demands from the Indian officers, the British resisted expansion of the Indian officer cadre. Indian leaders pressed the issue at the first Round Table Conference in 1930. The establishment of an Indian officer training college was one of the few concessions made at the conference. The Indian Military College Committee, set up under the chairmanship of General Sir Philip Chetwode, in 1931, recommended the establishment of an Indian Military Academy in Dehradun to produce forty commissioned officers twice a year following two and a half years of training.

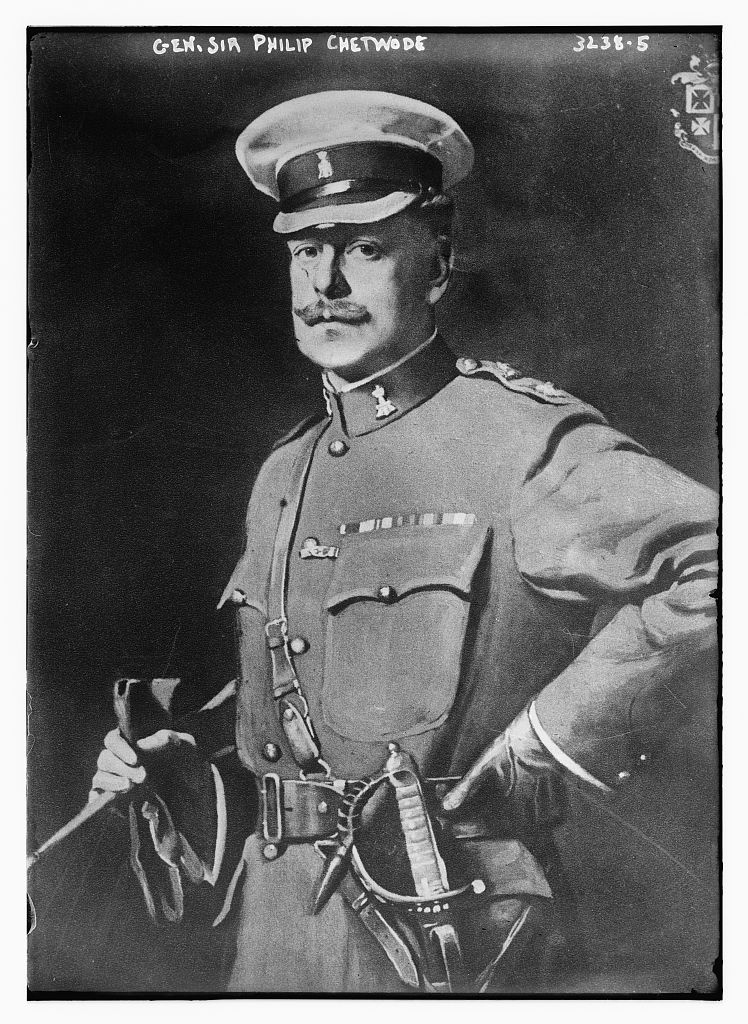
Then General Sir Philip Chetwode. He was promoted to Field Marshal in February 1933.

=== Inauguration to Independence ===
The Government of India transferred the former property of the Railway Staff College of the Indian Railways, with its 206-acre campus and associated infrastructure, to the Indian Military Academy. Brigadier L.P. Collins was appointed the first Commandant, and the first batch of 40 gentleman cadets (GC), as IMA trainees are known, began their training on 1 October 1932. The institute was inaugurated on 10 December 1932 by General Sir Philip Chetwode, 7th Bt. Chetwode was promoted to being a Field Marshal the following year, in February 1933.

In 1934, before the first batch had passed out, Viceroy Lord Willingdon presented the first colours to the academy on behalf of King George V. The first batch of cadets to graduate from the academy, graduating in December 1934, now known as the Pioneers, included Field Marshal Sam Manekshaw, General Muhammad Musa and General Smith Dun, who became the Army Chiefs of India, Pakistan, and Burma, respectively. (Note: The Pioneers also included Agha Abdul Hamid Khan, D Ranjit Rai, Mirza Hamid Hussain, Mohammad Habibullah Khattak, Melville de Mellow, Pritam Singh, Mohammad Zaman Khan and Mohan Singh.) General Dun graduated at the top of his class at IMA and also commanded the passing out parade for the first course. The second, third, fourth and fifth batches were called, respectively, Immortals, Invincible, Stalwarts and Bahadurs.

"The cadets came to the Academy from all parts of India as it was before the independence and partition of India in 1947. There were Punjabi Hindus and Mussalmans [...], Sikhs, Bengalis, Marathas, Madrasis, Coorgies [...] But we worked and lived as one, namely Indians first. I have emphasised it because even today, as far as the armed forces are concerned, the concept has not changed and is implemented in practice".
(Maj Gen. A. S. Naravane (Retd) joined IMA on 29 January 1936)

— (Naravane 2004, p. 11)

Through the first 16 regular courses that passed out of the academy, until May 1941, 524 officers were commissioned. But the outbreak of the Second World War resulted in an unprecedented increase in the number of entrants, a temporary reduction in the training period to six months, and an expansion of the campus. A total of 3,887 officers were commissioned between August 1941 and January 1946, including 710 British officers for the British Army. The academy reverted to its original two and a half year course of training at the end of the war. During the final years before Independence, the academy navigated the role of training officers for both colonial and postcolonial armies.

=== Post-Independence ===
Following the Independence of India in August 1947 and the subsequent partition creating Pakistan, a number of British officers who were trainers in the academy left for Britain, while Pakistani cadets left for Pakistan. A total of 110 Pakistani cadets then continued their training at Pakistan Military Academy, Kakul. Brigadier Thakur Mahadeo Singh, DSO, was appointed the first Indian Commandant of the academy. The 189 GCs who graduated on 20 December 1947 were the first class from IMA to be commissioned into a free India.

In late 1947, the Chiefs of Staff of the Indian Armed Forces, following the recommendation of a 1946 committee headed by Field Marshal Sir Claude Auchinleck, decided to initiate an action plan to commission a new Joint Services training academy. In the interim, they decided to conduct Joint Services training at IMA. The academy was renamed the Armed Forces Academy and a new Joint Services Wing (JSW) was commissioned on 1 January 1949, while training of Army officers continued in the Military Wing. The academy was renamed as the National Defence Academy (NDA) on 1 January 1950, ahead of India becoming a Republic. In December 1954, when the new Joint Services training academy was established in Khadakwasla, near Pune, the NDA name along with the Joint Services Wing was transferred to Khadakwasla. The academy in Dehradun was then rechristened as the Military College. Brigadier M.M. Khanna, MVC, was the first IMA alumnus to be appointed Commandant of IMA at the end of 1956. In 1960, the founding name, Indian Military Academy, was reinstated. On 10 December 1962, on the 30th anniversary of the academy's inauguration, the second President of India, Dr. Sarvapalli Radhakrishnan presented new colours to the academy.

After the Sino-Indian War of 1962, special measures were introduced. From 1963 until August 1964, the duration of regular classes was truncated, emergency courses were initiated, and new living quarters for cadets were added. However, unlike previous wars, the Indo-Pakistan War of 1965 and that of 1971 did not disrupt Academy training or graduation schedules. On 11 February 1971, William G Westmoreland, Chief of Staff, United States Army, visited the academy.

In 1976, the four battalions of the academy were renamed after Field Marshal Kodandera Madappa Cariappa, General Kodandera Subayya Thimayya, Field Marshal Sam Manekshaw, and Lieutenant General Premindra Singh Bhagat, with two companies each. On 15 December 1976, then President Fakhruddin Ali Ahmed presented new colours to the academy. In the 1970s, the Army Cadet College (ACC) was shifted from Pune to Dehradun, becoming a wing of IMA. In 2006, the ACC was merged into IMA as the fifth battalion, the Siachen Battalion.

By 1 October 2019, the 87th Raising Day, the number of GCs to have graduated from IMA stood at 61,762, including foreign alumni from 33 friendly countries. Foreign countries included Angola, Afghanistan, Bhutan, Myanmar, Ghana, Iraq, Jamaica, Kazakhstan, Kyrgyzstan, Malaysia, Nepal, Nigeria, Palestine, Philippines, Singapore, Sri Lanka, Tajikistan, Tanzania, Tonga, Uganda, Yemen and Zambia.

== Campus ==
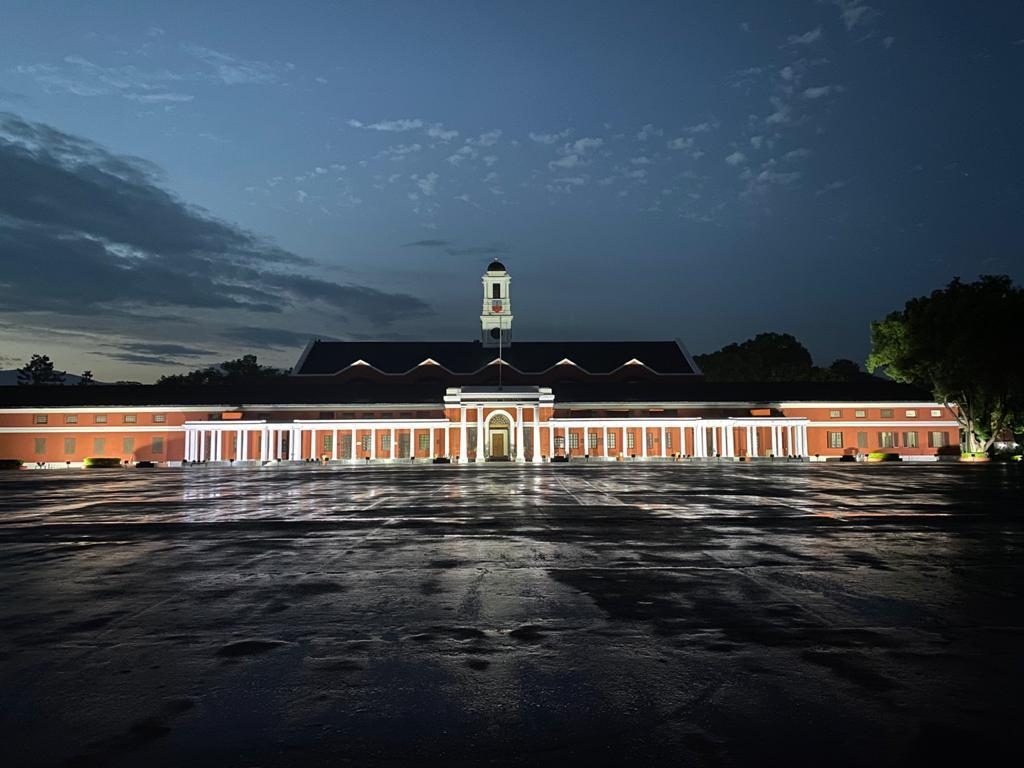
The Chetwode Building and the Drill Square.

The academy is in the Doon Valley (Dronacharya Ashram), (Note: As legend goes, Dehradun was the site of the academy of Dronacharya, where the Pandavas, Kauravas and other princes trained.) Uttarakhand. National Highway 72, the Dehradun–Chakrata Road, separates the North and South Campus. The campus of the academy covers an area of 1,400 acres (5.7 km^{2}). The Chetwode Hall on the drill square, built in 1930, houses the administrative headquarters of IMA and is also the hub of academic training. It has lecture halls, computer labs, and a cafe. On the opposite side of the drill square is the Khetarpal Auditorium. Opened in 1982, it has a seating capacity of over 1,500. A newer wing of the Chetwode building, added in 1938, houses the central library. It has over 100,000 volumes and subscriptions to hundreds of periodicals from across the world, in addition to multimedia sections. In addition, there are two branch libraries closer to the cadet barracks across the campus.

The IMA museum on the campus displays artifacts of historic importance such as the pistol of Lieutenant General Amir Abdullah Khan Niazi of the Pakistan Army, given upon his surrender to Lt. Gen Jagjit Singh Aurora after signing the instrument of surrender to end the Bangladesh liberation war of 1971. A captured Pakistan Army Patton tank is also on the grounds.

=== Athletic facilities ===
The South Campus of IMA includes facilities such as the Somnath Stadium, with a seating capacity of 3,000, the Salaria Aquatic Centre, consisting of an Olympic sized swimming pool, and the Hoshiar Singh Gymnasium. The North Campus includes the polo ground along the Tons River. Tons Valley to the northwest of the campus is used for para-dropping, para-gliding, skydiving, and battle training. Other facilities include stables with a stud farm, a small arms shooting range, and épée fencing from the modern pentathlon.

=== War memorial ===
The IMA War Memorial commemorates the alumni of the academy who died in action. At the sanctum sanctorum of the memorial is a bronze statue of a gentleman cadet with a sword presenting arms. The memorial was inaugurated by Field Marshal Manekshaw on 17 November 1999, shortly after the conclusion of the Kargil War. IMA officers led and fought in the war, with some of them becoming household names in India for their gallantry. Among their ranks were two Param Vir Chakra recipients and eight Maha Vir Chakra recipients. In 2017, Lieutenant Ummer Fayaz Parray was the 847th name to be engraved on the War Memorial.

== Gentleman cadet life ==
There are various modes of entry into IMA, which include: on graduation from National Defence Academy, on graduation from Army Cadet College (a wing of IMA itself), direct entry through the Combined Defence Services Examination followed by SSB exams, and technical entry under university and college schemes. While those who gain entry into IMA go on to become permanently commissioned officers, those who go to the other officer training academies such as Officer Training Academy, Chennai are trained for short service commission. Depending on entry criteria married or unmarried male candidates are allowed to voluntarily apply for the course. Lady Cadets are not inducted into the Indian Army through IMA, though there has been talk of the same. IMA has a sanctioned capacity of 1,650.

A trainee on admission to IMA is referred to as a gentleman cadet (GC). One reason for this is that the academy expects its graduates to uphold the highest moral and ethical values. Inscribed in the oak paneling at the eastern entrance of the Chetwode Hall is the academy's credo, excerpted from the speech of Field Marshal Chetwode at the inauguration of the academy in 1932:

The safety, honour and welfare of your country come first, always and every time.
The honour, welfare and comfort of the men you command come next.
Your own ease, comfort, and safety come last, always and every time.

— Field Marshal Philip Chetwode (Note: A shorter version of this is used as the academy's credo – "Your country first, the men you command next, and yourself last".)

The freshman GCs hail from diverse backgrounds from all parts of India. The training is action-filled, intense, diverse, and fast. Significant emphasis is placed on self-discipline. The official website of the Indian Army describes the training as "a test of one's mettle and capabilities, and in psychological terms a foretaste of what the trainees would face in the battlefield". On passing out GCs are permanently commissioned into the Army as Lieutenants.

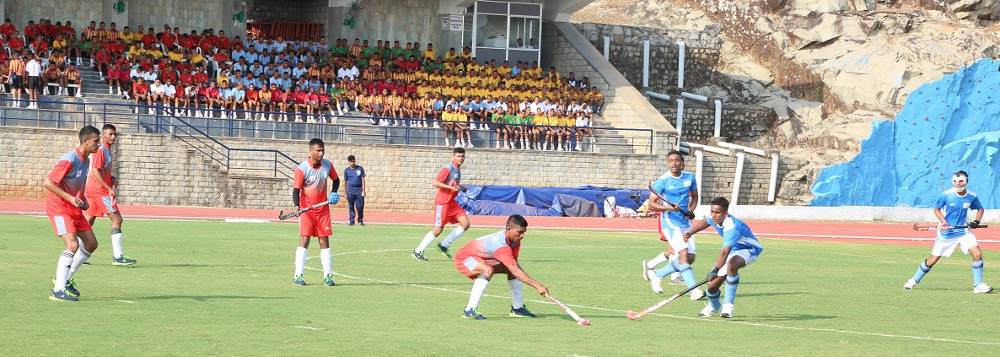
IMA and AFA during the Sabhiki Cup-2016, a sports meet for trainees of five premier officer training academies of the Army, Navy and Air Force.

The IMA is not merely a training establishment where one is trained to be an officer, but a source of continuous inspiration for its alumni.

— (Singh 2007, p. 8)

=== Organization ===
IMA cadets are organized as a regiment with four training battalions of three companies each. There were twelve companies in 2013. Battalions are named after generals of the Indian Army (except for Siachen Battalion), while companies are named after battles in which the Army has participated.

- Cariappa Battalion: Kohima Company, Naushera Company, Poonch Company
- Thimayya Battalion: Alamein Company, Meiktila Company, Sangro Company
- Manekshaw Battalion: Imphal Company, Zojila Company, Jessore Company
- Bhagat Battalion: Sinhgarh Company, Keren Company, Cassino Company
- Siachen Battalion: Erstwhile Army Cadet College

=== Training ===
Technical graduates, ex-NDA, ex-ACC, and university entry cadets undergo training at IMA for one year. Direct entry cadets train for one and a half years. A gentleman cadet gets a stipend of ₹56,100 (equivalent to ₹72,000 or US$750 in 2026) per month for the duration of the course (as per the 7th pay commission).

IMA's mission is to train future military leaders of the Indian Army. Physical training, drills, weapons training, and leadership development form the focus of the training. Character building is embedded in the honour code of IMA "I shall not lie, steal or cheat, nor tolerate those who do so". From the honour code came the adoption of "The Gentleman Cadet's Resolve" and in turn the Credo, Honour Code and Resolve became the academy Trishul for conduct of cadets. The "Warrior Code" of IMA which has been adopted from the "Bhagwat Gita", the punch line of it being "I am a Warrior, fighting is my dharma;" also talks of compassion.

Training is broadly categorised into character-building, service subjects, and academic subjects. Service subjects give basic military knowledge up to the standard required for an infantry platoon commander. Academic subjects provide the cadet with a general education to enable a basic knowledge in professional subjects as well as enable cadets to clearly express themselves both verbally and in writing. In the early 1970s, the service subjects to academic subjects ratio was 16:9 (64% service to 36% academic); this ratio was enhanced for technical graduates to a ratio of 83% service subjects and 27% academic subjects. Over time, this ratio varied as per regular course entry or technical entry, and changed as terms were increased or decreased.

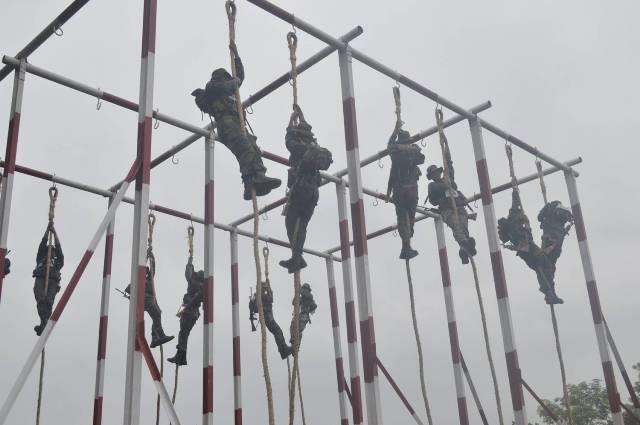
Physical endurance training for GCs

Weapon training includes the close quarter battle range, the location of miss and hit target system, (Note: The location of miss and hit system provides real-time feedback to a shooter of the precise location of the round as it passes through/by the target. It can be integrated into a standard army range.) jungle lane shooting (Note: A jungle lane is a trail in a forested area with targets hung at different places. Targets are to be engaged by one or more members of the team, even if that member isn't the closest to the target. Another version of this is the "shoot house," which takes place inside a building. Sometimes jungle lanes and shoot houses are combined.) and the team battle shooting range. The curriculum is reviewed from time to time and adapted to whatever the current situation of the country is. Cadets are also put in roles where they need to think like the enemy, such as in Exercise Chindit where some GCs are asked to act as terrorists while others have to capture them. They are trained in various forms of warfare, including conventional war, proxy war, low-intensity conflict, and counter-insurgency. An integral part of the training is the ustads or instructors numbering about 200. The ustads are responsible for aspects of training, including drills, weapons training, and field craft.

Games and sports include cross country, hockey, basketball, polo, athletics, football, aquatics, volleyball, and boxing. There is also an annual sports meet with other military academies in India. Adventure activities undertaken at the academy include trekking, cycling, and rock climbing. In 1997, a cadet died during a boxing session. In 2007 a cadet died in a grenade blast. In 2009 a cadet died by drowning. Between 2017 and 2019, three cadets died during training. Two cadets died of exhaustion during a 10 km run, while a third died after slipping into a gorge during a night navigation exercise. The academy requires that cadets get insurance against death and disability during training.

=== Passing out parade ===
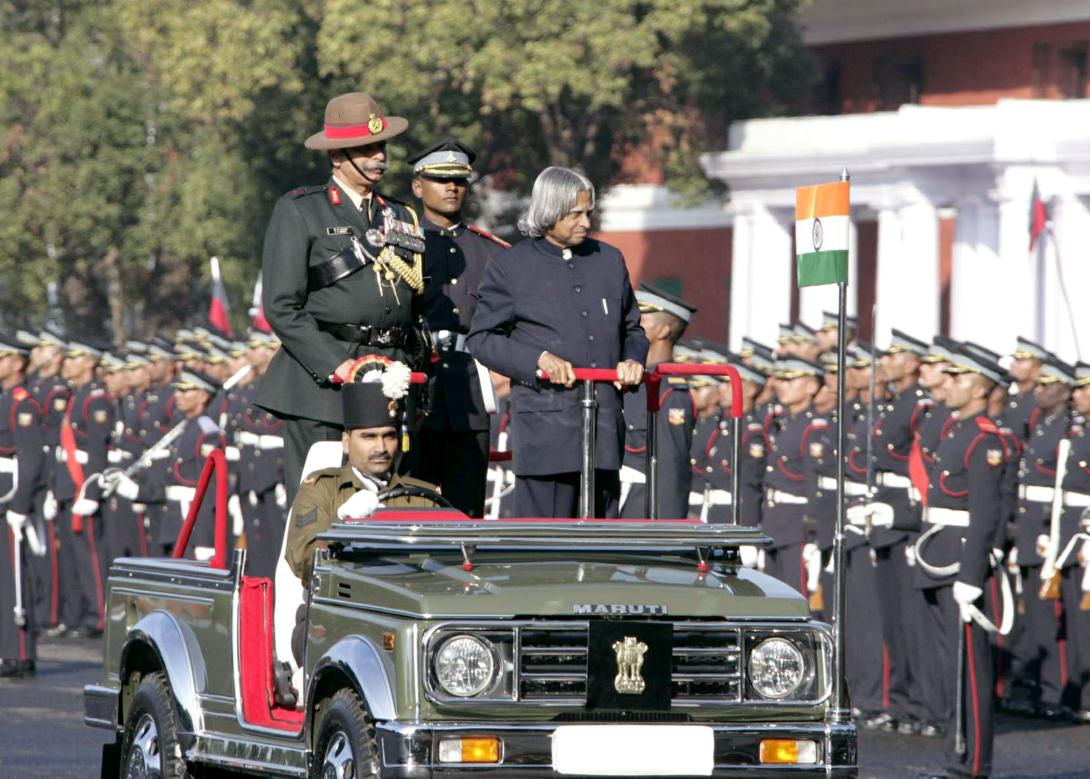
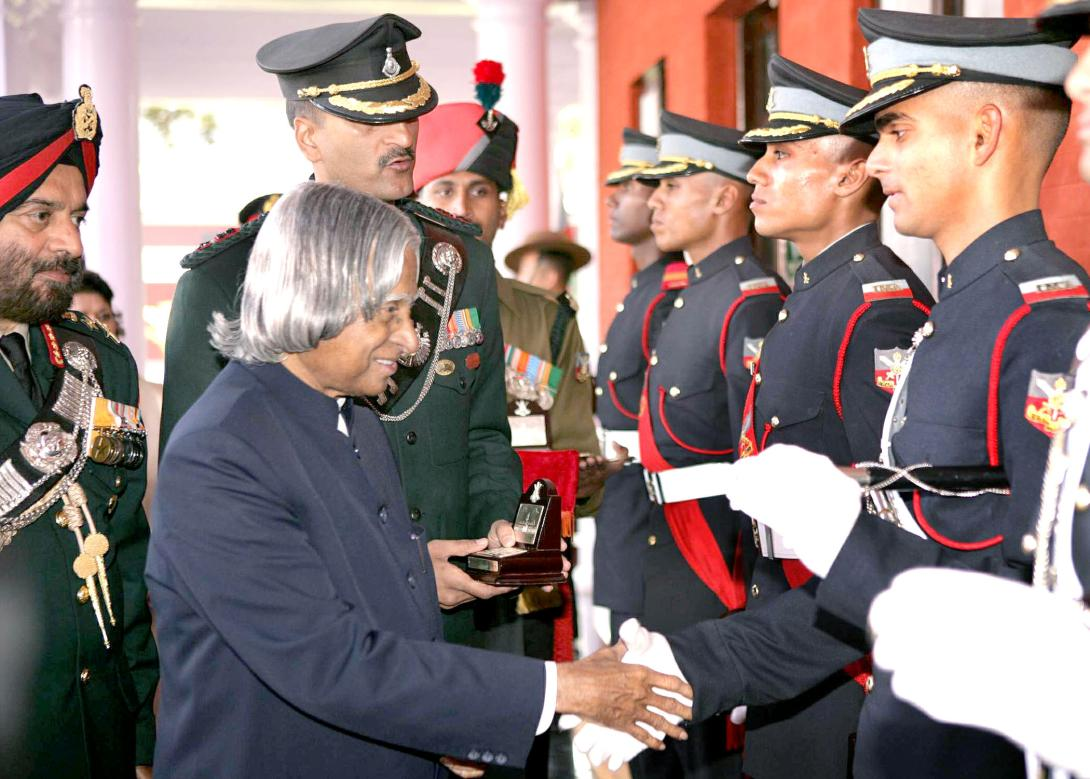
Dr. A.P.J. Abdul Kalam at the Passing Out Parade of 119 Regular and Allied Course

One of the most well-known traditions in the IMA is the passing out parade (POP). Before the cadets begin the POP, the band plays an aarti, allowing the cadets to pray to their respective gods. Traditionally, the adjutant leads the parade. In 2019, the reviewing officer for the 136th parade was Lt. Gen. Cherish Mathson. IMA has adopted a song penned by Javed Akhtar for its POPs — Bharat mata teri kasam, tere rakshak rahenge hum (transl. Mother India, I swear on you. I will be your protector).

During the POP, a civilian dignitary may also make a speech, as was the case during the passing out parade in 1962 when the President Dr. Sarvepalli. Radhakrishnan addressed the cadets, and in 2007 when the Prime Minister Manmohan Singh did so. In 1982, during the golden jubilee, Prime Minister Indira Gandhi inspected the POP while in 1992, the President R. Venkataraman reviewed the diamond jubilee POP (winter term). In 2006, President APJ Abdul Kalam was the reviewing officer at the POP.

The finale is the antim pag (final step), where cadets take the last step into Chetwode Hall. However the POP on 11 June 1961 was called off without the final step due to weather, the only instance where this has happened for a passing out batch. The tradition of cap-flinging during the passing out parade has a long past but it was replaced by the cadets doing celebratory pushups. The passing out also consists of traditions such as presentation of a "Sword of Honour" to the best GC. Notable recipients of the Sword of Honour include the first Chief of Defence Staff Bipin Rawat (in 1978) and the Olympian and union minister Col. Rajyavardhan Singh Rathore (in 1990).

== Notable gallantry awardees ==
Notable people

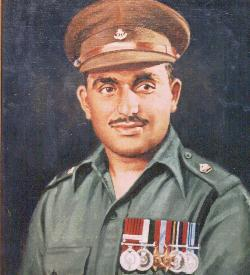
Somnath Sharma

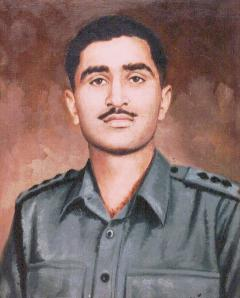
Gurbachan Singh Salaria

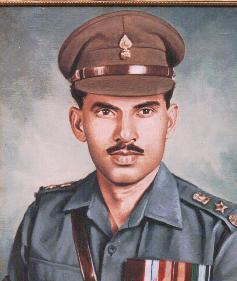
Hoshiar Singh Dahiya

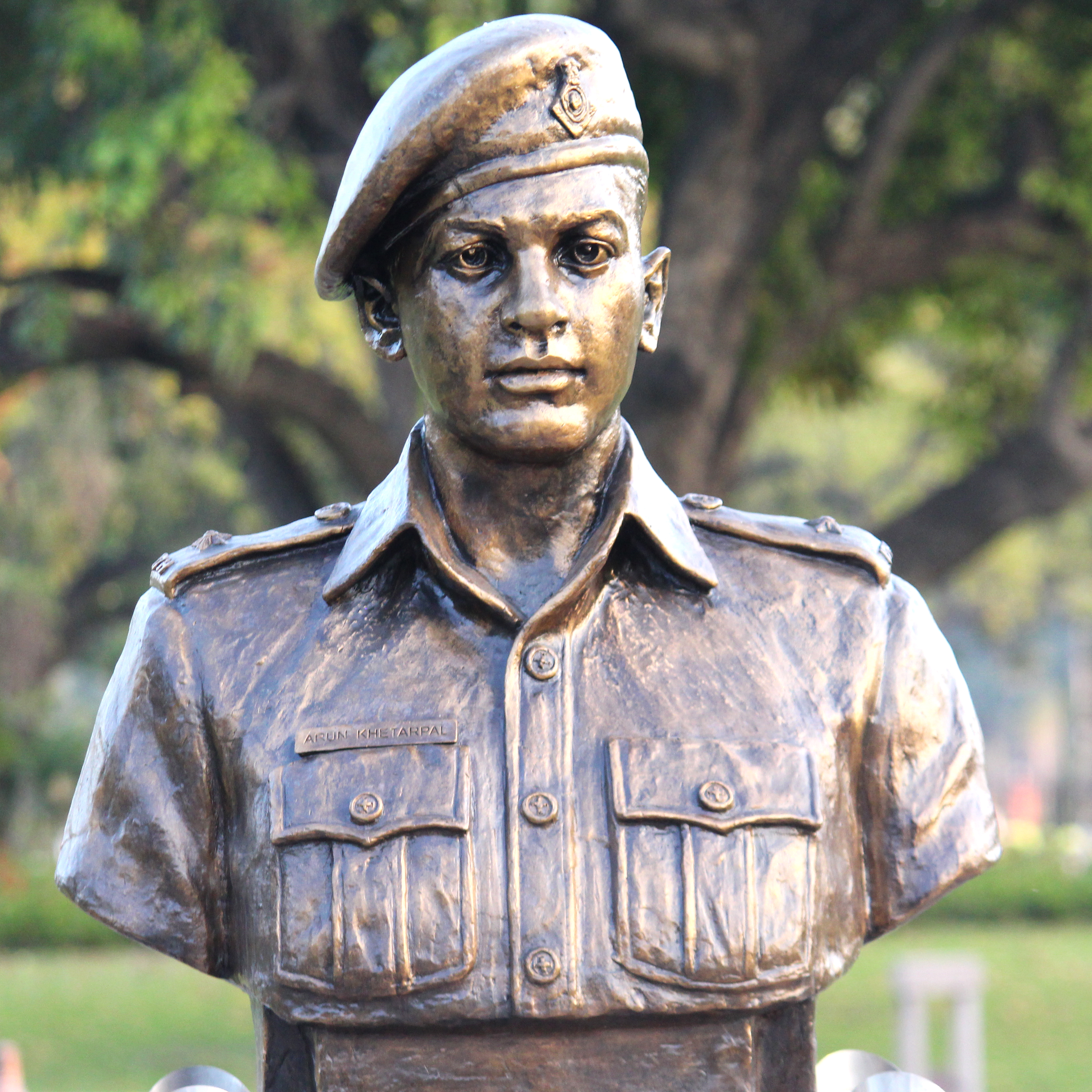
Arun Khetarpal

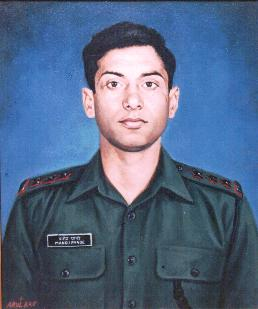
Manoj Kumar Pandey

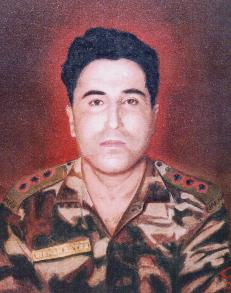
Vikram Batra

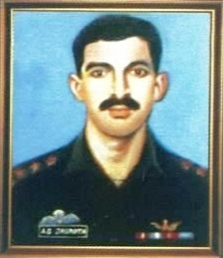
Arun Singh Jasrotia

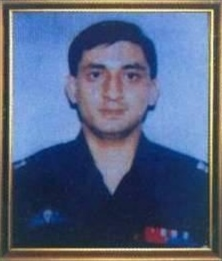
Sudhir Kumar Walia

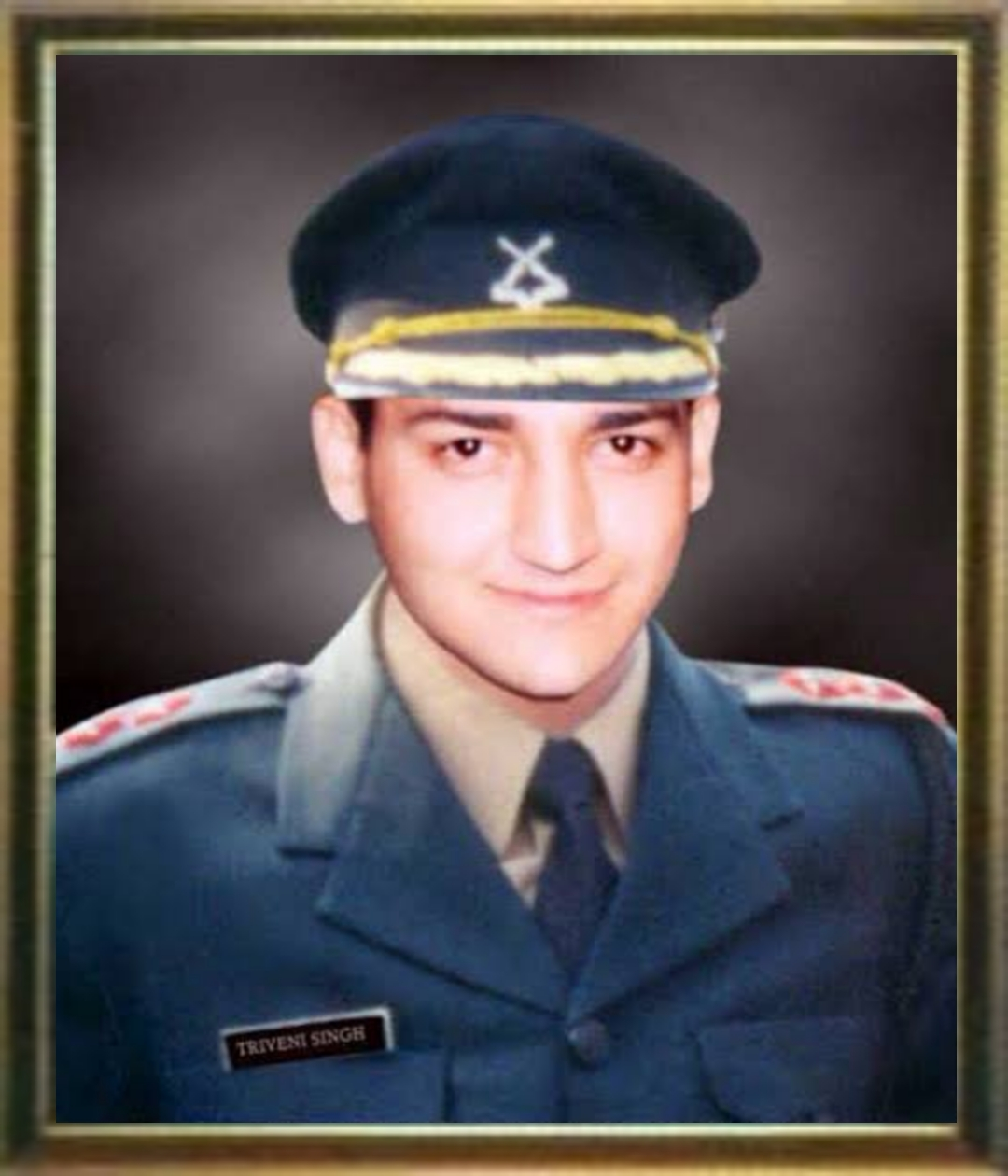
Triveni Singh

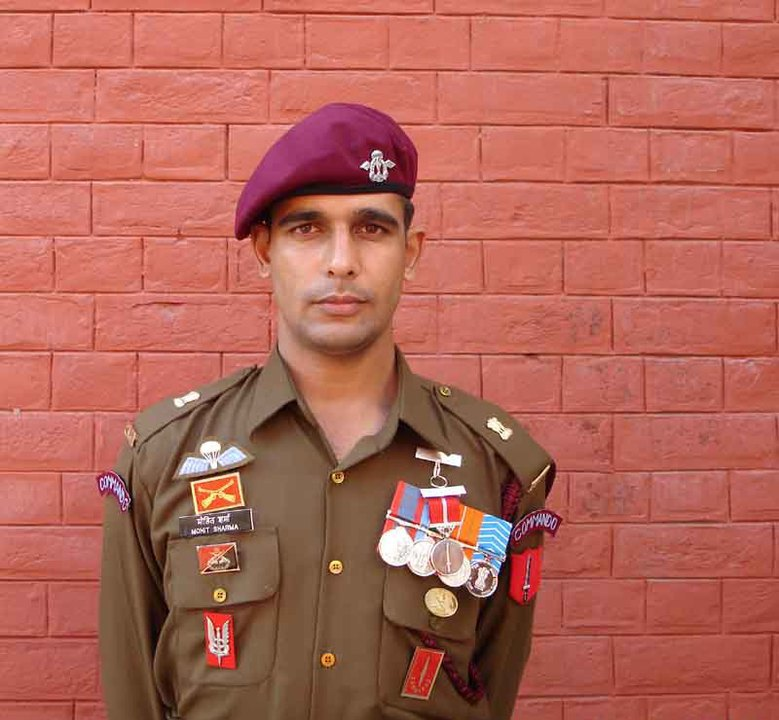
Mohit Sharma

=== Param Vir Chakra awardees ===
- Maj Somnath Sharma
- Capt Gurbachan Singh Salaria
- Col Hoshiar Singh Dahiya
- 2/Lt Arun Khetarpal
- Capt Manoj Kumar Pandey
- Capt. Vikram Batra

=== Ashok Chakra awardees ===
- 2/Lt Pollur Mutthuswamy Raman
- Capt Ummed Singh Mahra
- Lt Ram Prakash Roperia
- Maj Bhukant Mishra
- 2/Lt Rakesh Singh Malhan
- Col Neelakantan Jayachandran Nair KC
- Capt Sandeep Sankhla
- Maj Rajiv Kumar Joon SC
- Capt Arun Singh Jasrotia, SM
- 2/Lt Puneet Nath Datt
- Lt Col Shanti Swaroop Rana
- Maj Sudhir Kumar Walia SM**
- Lt Triveni Singh
- Capt Harshan R Nair
- Col Vasanth Venugopal
- Maj Dinesh Raghu Raman
- Maj Sandeep Unnikrishnan
- Maj Mohit Sharma SM

== Sports achievements ==
- Col Rajyavardhan Singh Rathore AVSM - Won a Silver medal at the 2004 Summer Olympics
- Col Balbir Singh Kullar - Captain of the Indian hockey team in the 1971 Hockey World Cup
- Maj Gen Mohammed Amin Naik - Arjuna Award in Rowing
- Maj DP Singh - India's first Blade Runner

== Notable alumni ==
- Air Marshal Asghar Khan – 1st native Commander-in-Chief of the Pakistan Air Force
- Air Commodore M. K. Janjua – most senior officer of the Royal Pakistan Air Force
- Lt Gen Khwaja Wasiuddin – served in the Pakistan Army, Bangladesh Army, also a member of Nawab of Dhaka Family
- General Yahya Khan – Commander-in-Chief of Pakistan Army and President of Pakistan
- General Abdul Hamid Khan – Chief of Staff of the Pakistan Army.
- General Tikka Khan – Chief of Army Staff of Pakistan Army
- Lt Gen Gul Hassan Khan – Commander-in-Chief of Pakistan Army
- General Zia-ul-Haq – Chief of Army Staff and President of Pakistan
- Lt Gen Sahabzada Yaqub Khan – Pakistan Ambassador to the United States and later Foreign Minister
- Brigadier Aslam Khan – Captured Kennedy Peak (Myanmar) in World War II and served in CENTO
- General Musa Khan – Commander-in-Chief of Pakistan Army
- Lt Gen Habibullah Khan Khattak – Chief of General Staff (Pakistan)
- Captain Raja Muhammad Sarwar – Nishan-i-Haider
- Major Tufail Mohammad – Nishan-i-Haider
- Major General Muhammad Anwar Khan – first Engineer-in-Chief, Pakistan Army
- Lt Gen Smith Dun – Chief of the Army Staff Myanmar Army

=== International alumni ===
Some of IMA's International alumni include:

- Gen Ibrahim Ismail – Chief of Staff Malaysian Armed Forces
- Gen Ibrahim Babangida – Military President of Nigeria
- Maj Gen Tunku Ismail Sultan Ibrahim – Crown Prince of Johor state, Malaysia
- Sher Mohammad Abbas Stanikzai – Afghan Taliban Politician
- Sultan Sallehuddin — Sultan of Kedah State, Malaysia

== In popular culture ==
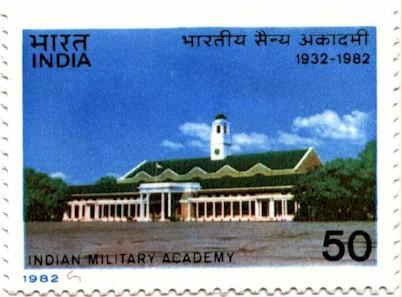
A commemorative golden jubilee postal stamp of the Indian Military Academy. Visible is the Chetwode Building, built in 1930 and designed by Robert Tor Russell.

The 2004 Bollywood film Lakshya is partly shot in IMA as well as the Tamil film Vaaranam Aayiram. In 2015 Tanushree Podder penned a novel called On The Double: Drills, Drama, and Dare-Devilry at the Indian Military Academy, a fictional portrayal of a gentleman cadet's life. Making of a Warrior, a documentary by Dipti Bhalla and Kunal Verma, provides an inside look at IMA's culture, traditions and training regime. The 2023 Indian biopic film Sam Bahadur also featured IMA.

== See also ==
- Air Force Academy, Dundigal Hyderabad
- Indian Naval Academy, Ezhimala
- Indian National Defence University
- Military academies in India
- National Defence Academy, Khadakwasla
- National Defence College, New Delhi
- Officers Training Academy, Chennai

== Notes and references ==
=== Bibliography ===
- Singh, Brigadier M. P. (2007). History of the Indian Military Academy. Ludhiana: Unistar Books. ISBN 9788189899561.
- Singh, Vijay Kumar (2005), Leadership in the Indian Army: Biographies of Twelve Soldiers, SAGE Publications, ISBN 978-0-7619-3322-9
- Sharma, Gautam (1996). Nationalisation of the Indian Army, 1885–1947. New Delhi: Allied Publishers Limited. ISBN 8170235553.
- Naravane, Maj Gen. A. S. (2004). "Chapter 3 – Life at the Indian Military Academy". A Soldier's Life in War and Peace. New Delhi: A. P. H. Publishing Corporation. ISBN 8176484377.
