= K Anantharaman =

Air Officer in Charge of Administration, India

Air Marshal K Anantharaman PVSM VSM
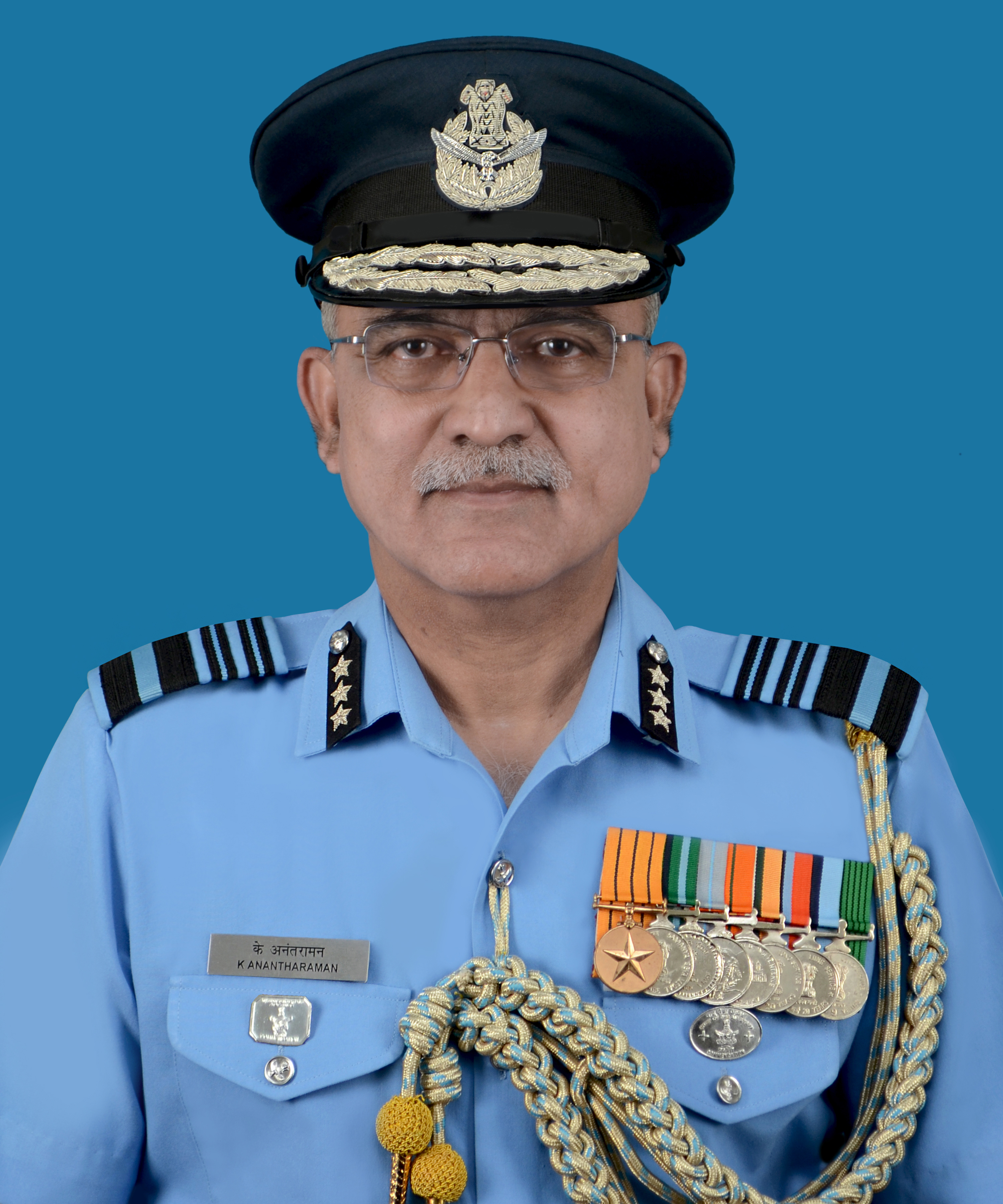

Air Officer in Charge of Administration
- In office 1 February 2022 – 31 May 2023
- Preceded by: Vijay Pal Singh Rana

Personal details
- Awards: Param Vishisht Seva Medal; Vishisht Seva Medal

Military service
- Allegiance: India
- Branch/service: Indian Air Force
- Years of service: 14 June 1985 – Present
- Rank: Air Marshal
- Commands: Air Officer in Charge of Administration; Air Force Administrative College
- Service number: 17882 ADM

Air Marshal K Anantharaman, PVSM, VSM is a retired officer of the Indian Air Force. He served as the Air Officer in Charge of Administration. He assumed the office on 1 February 2022 succeeding Air Marshal Vijay Pal Singh Rana. He superannuated on 31 May 2023.

== Early life and education ==
K Anantharaman is an alumnus of Defence Services Staff College, Wellington, College of Defence Management and National Defence College, New Delhi. He attended the Combined Strategic Intelligence Training Programme at DIA, Washington DC in 2005.

== Career ==
K Anantharaman was commissioned in Administration branch of Indian Air Force in June 1985. In a career spanning over 38 years, held a number of important command and staff appointments.

As Group Captain, he served as the Chief Administration Officer at New Delhi and later held role at the Training Command, Bengaluru.

As Air Commodore, he served as the Chief Personnel Staff Officer at New Delhi.

As Air Vice Marshal, he served as the Senior Officer-in-charge Administration, Western Air Command at New Delhi till February 2021.

After his promotion to Air Marshal in February 2021, he served as the Director General, Administration till 31 January 2022.

He took over as the Air Officer in Charge, Administration on 1 February 2022 from Air Marshal Vijay Pal Singh Rana. He also serves as the Commodore Commandant of the Air Force Administrative College.

== Honours and decorations ==
During his career, K Anantharaman has been awarded the Param Vishisht Seva Medal in 2023 and Vishisht Seva Medal in 2016 for his service.

Param Vishisht Seva Medal	Vishisht Seva Medal

Military offices
Preceded by Vijay Pal Singh Rana	Air Officer in Charge, Administration; 1 February 2022 – 31 May 2023	Succeeded by Rajesh Kumar Anand
Preceded by Vijay Pal Singh Rana	Director General – Administration; 1 February 2021 – 31 January 2022	Succeeded by Rajesh Kumar Anand
