= AFAC =

AFAC may refer to:

- Agencia Federal de Aviación Civil (Federal Civil Aviation Agency or ACAF), a government agency of Mexico
- Air Force Administrative College, a training institute of the Indian Air Force
- Arab Fund for Arts and Culture (AFAC)
- Australasian Fire and Emergency Service Authorities Council
