= Shanti Swaroop Rana =

Indian military officer

Lieutenant Colonel Shanti Swarup Rana AC
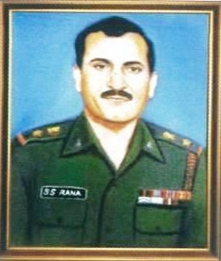
- Portrait of Lt Col Shanti Swarup Rana]]
- Born: 17 September 1949; Badla Hoshiarpur, Punjab, India
- Died: 2 November 1996 (aged 47); Kupwara, Jammu & Kashmir, India
- Alma mater: Army Cadet College
- Spouse: Savita Rana
- Military career
- Allegiance: India
- Branch: Indian Army
- Service years: 1977-1996
- Rank: Lieutenant Colonel
- Service number: IC-34425L
- Units: 3 Bihar Regiment; 13 Rashtriya Rifles
- Awards: Ashoka Chakra

Lieutenant Colonel Shanti Swarup Rana was an Indian military officer, who was commissioned on 11 June 1977, into the 3rd Battalion of the Bihar Regiment. He is a posthumous recipient of Ashok Chakra, India's highest peacetime gallantry award.

== Early life ==
Lt Col Shanti Swarup Rana, was born on 17 September 1949 in village Badla of Hoshiarpur district in Punjab. Youngest among his four brothers and three sisters, Lt Col Rana had his early education in a Govt School in Rampur, in Hoshiarpur district. He was among the best students of his class.

== Military career ==
As Rana grew older, his passion for Army also grew. He initially joined the Army in the Corps of Signals and was later selected for the Army Cadet College, Dehra Dun. After completing his training, he was commissioned into 3 Bihar on 11 June 1977 as a second lieutenant, with promotion to lieutenant on 11 June 1979 and to captain on 11 June 1983.

A veteran of Operation Rhino, Operation Pawan and Operation Rakshak, Rana was promoted to major on 11 June 1988. He became second-in-command of the 24 Rashtriya Rifles, after being promoted to the rank of Lt Col in 1994.

== Operation in Haphruda Forest ==
On 2 November 1996, Lt Col Swarup Rana while serving with 13 Rashtriya Rifles was entrusted with the task of destroying two terrorist camps in the Haphruda forest of Kupwara District in Jammu & Kashmir. He spotted four well fortified hideouts stocked heavily with arms and ammunition including tonnes of explosives. In a gallant and swift strike, he destroyed these hideouts. One more well concealed hideout came to his notice. During the action that followed, the terrorists resorted to heavy firing from their well fortified bunker. Lt Col Rana organised his troops, crawled towards the bunker and threw hand grenades inside. Two foreign mercenaries came out firing heavily. He killed both of them instantaneously.

Meanwhile, the terrorists seriously injured Lt Col Rana in heavy firing from another location. In spite of this, the gallant officer kept on boosting the morale of his soldiers. When one more terrorist advanced towards the soldiers, Lt Col Rana without caring for this own life, charged and killed him in a hand-to-hand encounter. In this action, this gallant officer sustained fatal bullet injuries and made the supreme sacrifice. Lt Col Rana displayed indomitable courage, patriotism and gallantry of the highest order. For this act of indomitable courage, Lt Col SS Rana was awarded the Ashoka Chakra posthumously.

== Ashoka Chakra Awardee ==
Lt Col Rana was given the nation's highest peace time gallantry award, "Ashok Chakra" (posthumous) for his exceptional bravery, indomitable spirit, leadership and supreme sacrifice.
