= Bihar Regiment =

Infantry regiment of the Indian Army

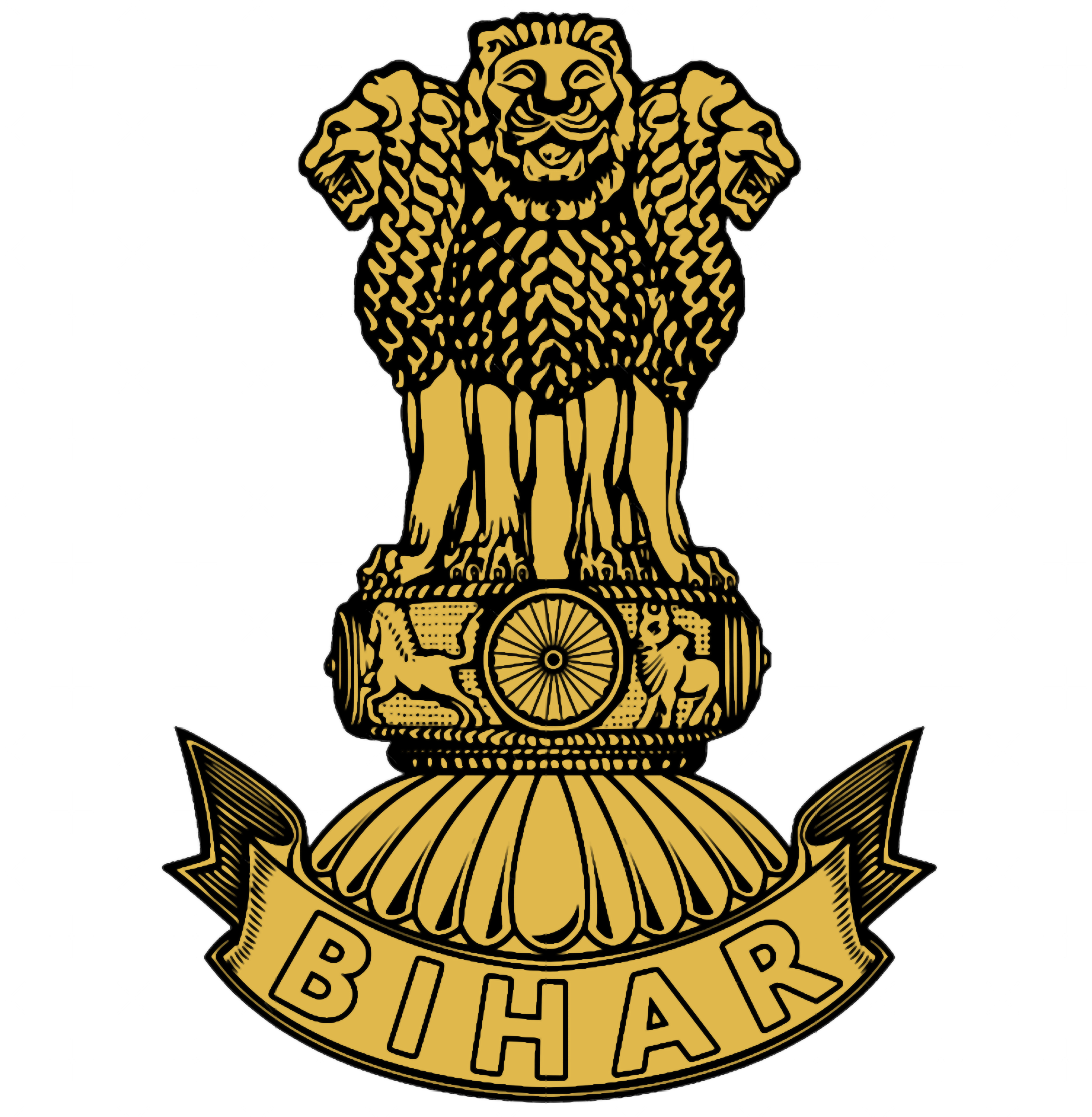
- Regimental Insignia of the Bihar Regiment
- Active: 1941–Present
- Country: British India 1941–1947; India 1947–Present
- Branch: Indian Army
- Type: Line Infantry
- Role: Infantry
- Size: 28 Battalions
- Regimental Centre: Danapur Cantonment, Patna
- Nicknames: Veer Biharis; Killer Machines; Jungle Warriors; Bajrang Bali's Army
- Motto: Karam Hi Dharam (Work is Worship)
- War Cries: Jai Bajrang Bali (Victory to Bajrang Bali) and Birsa Munda Ki Jai (Victory to Birsa Munda)
- Decorations: Pre Independence: Distinguished Service Order (DSO) - 02; Member of the Order of the British Empire (MBE) - 03; Military Cross (MC) - 03; Order of British India (OBI) - 04; Military Medal (MM) - 02; IDSO - 02; Gallantry Certificate - 03; Post Independence: Ashoka Chakra (AC) - 04; PVSM - 08; Mahavir Chakra (MVC) - 03; Kirti Chakra (KC) - 14; AVSM - 15; Vir Chakra (VrC) - 19; Shaurya Chakra (SC) - 49; Yudh Seva Medal (YSM) - 10; Sena Medal (SM) - 205; Jivan Rakshak Padak - 07; Vishisht Seva Medal (VSM) - 45; Mention in Despatches - 56; COAS Commendation Card - 460; GOC-in-C’s Commendation Card - 480
- Battle honours: Haka, Gangaw, Akhaura and Batalik

Commanders
- Colonel of the Regiment: Lieutenant General Akaash Johar, AVSM
- Notable commanders: Lieutenant General Joginder Singh Gharaya, MVC, KC, VSM; Lieutenant General Kulwant Singh Mann, PVSM, AVSM

Insignia
- Regimental Insignia: The Ashoka Lion

The Bihar Regiment is an infantry regiment of the Indian Army. It traces its origins back to the British Indian Army. The Bihar Regiment was formed in 1941 by regularising the 11th (Territorial) Battalion, the 19th Hyderabad Regiment, and raising new battalions. The Bihar Regimental Centre (BRC) is located at Danapur Cantonment, Patna, the second oldest cantonment of India.

== Bihari martial tradition ==
The martial tradition of Bihar troops in the era of British rule traces its origins to the 34th sepoy battalion raised in 1757 by Lord Clive of the British East India Company at Patna. The battalion was formed by men entirely from the Bhojpur (Arrah) district. Later battalions recruited from the entire Shahabad area (the present day districts of Bhojpur (Arrah), Buxar, Rohtas & Kaimur in Bihar). Their success in combat impressed Mir Kasim, the Nawab of Bengal from 1760 to 1763, who began raising units trained in western combat techniques. Bihari battalions raised by Mir Kasim defeated the British in some engagements. The Bihari, or Purbiya, soldiers thereafter made up the backbone of the Bengal Infantry of the British Colonial Army.

They were not only excellent soldiers but also quick to learn and apply the tactical drills with initiative. They were disciplined when led by good officers but capable of hostility when their beliefs and customs were disregarded. The Indian Rebellion of 1857 against the introduction of greased cartridges (thought to be done so with a mixture of beef and pork fat—abhorrent to Hindus and Muslims), was led by Bihari troops, who preferred being blown by the guns exploding to losing their faith. Thereafter, Biharis were not encouraged to enter military service by the British until after World War I.

Their victories at home including those of Buxar, Karnatic and Maratha Wars along with those in Malaya, Sumatra and Egypt won them laurels.

== Composition and Recruitment ==
At raising, the class composition of the first battalion was - Adivasis from Bihar, Orissa, Bengal and eastern states, and Ahirs, Rajputs, Bhumihar's, Kurmi, and Mussulmans from Bihar. The regiment continued recruitment from the state of Old Bihar (Greater Bihar) (i.e. present-day Bihar and Jharkhand), along with a small number from Odisha. Most units presently have two companies of troops from Bihar and parts of Uttar Pradesh, and two companies with tribals, mainly from Jharkhand and Odisha — Mundas, Santhals, Hos, Oraons and others. Some units now have an all India, all class composition.

== History ==
The present Bihar Regiment took its initial form in 1923, when an Indian Territorial Force Battalion named the 11/19 Hyderabad Regiment was formed with its headquarters at Dinapore Cantonment. The Bihar Regiment was formed in 1941 during World War II by regularising the 11th (Territorial) Battalion, 19th Hyderabad Regiment as the 1st Battalion, Bihar Regiment. The first commanding officer was Lieutenant Colonel John Reginald Howard Tweed. The 2nd Battalion was raised in December 1942.

=== Bihar Regiment in World War II ===
The newly raised 1 Bihar saw action in the Burma Campaign. The battalion was part of the famous Lushai Brigade and captured Haka on 19 October 1944 and Gangaw on 11 January 1945. 2 Bihar formed part of Operation Zipper under Lieutenant Colonel (Later Lieutenant General) Sant Singh for the reoccupation of British Malaya.

In recognition of the gallant actions, the Battalion was awarded two Battle Honours namely Haka and Gangaw, and was also bestowed with the Theatre Honour of Burma.

=== Post Independence ===
Soon after independence, both battalions participated in the Indo-Pakistani War of 1947 in the Kashmir Valley during 1948–49.

During the Indo-Pakistani War of 1965, 7 Bihar captured Bedori, paving the way for the capture of Haji Pir Pass.

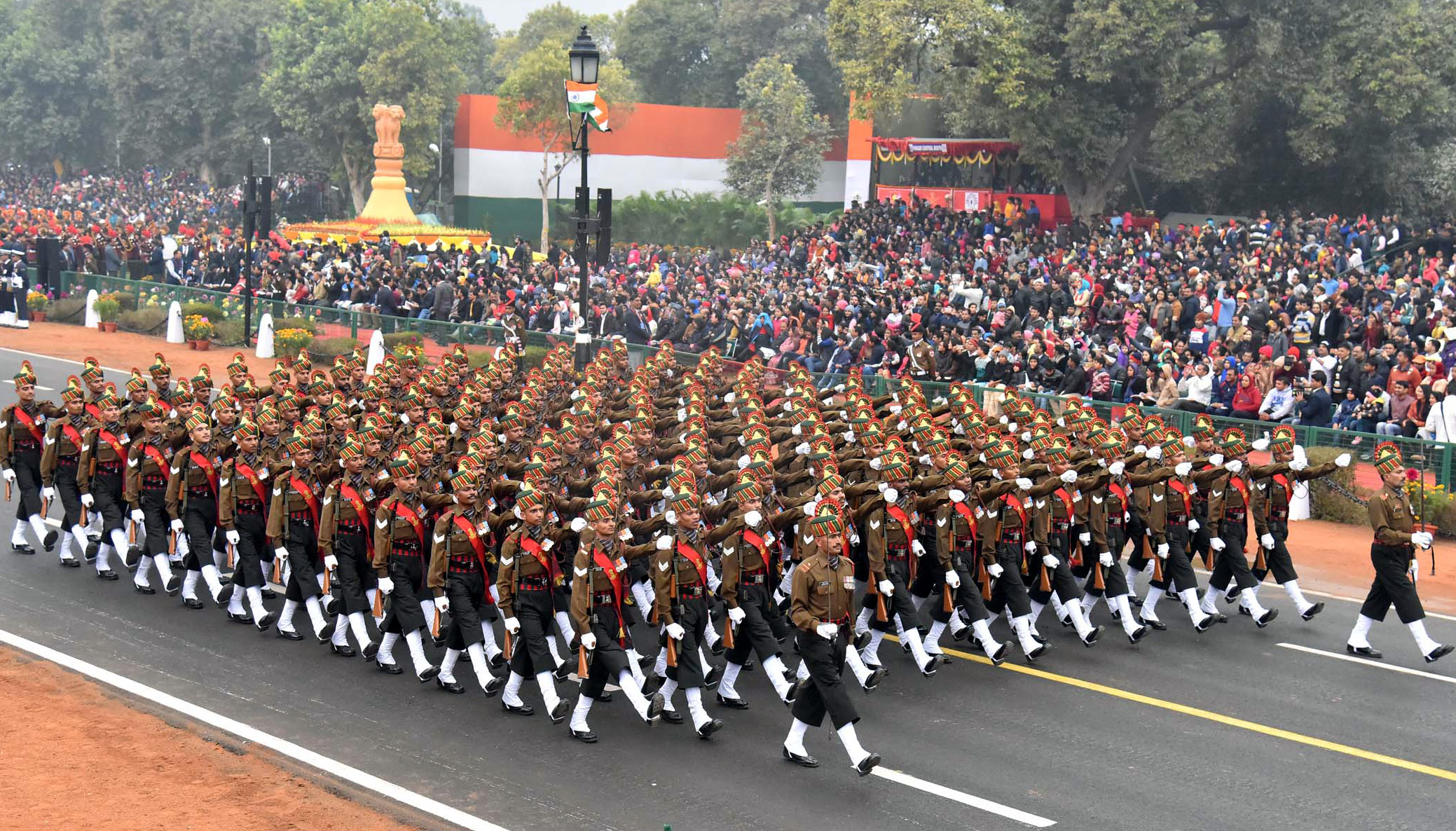
The Bihar Regiment Centre Contingent passes through the Rajpath, on the occasion of the 68th Republic Day Parade 2017

By the start of the Indo-Pakistani War of 1971, the Regiment had expanded to 11 battalions. The sixth, seventh, eighth, tenth and eleventh battalions participated in operations in the eastern sector. 10 Bihar was conferred the theatre honour 'East Pakistan' for the capture of Akhaura. On 15 December 1971, a seaborne expedition was launched at Cox's Bazar to prevent Pakistani troops from escaping into Burma. 11 Bihar formed part of this amphibious task force. In the Western theatre of the war, 3 Bihar captured Wanjal.

4, 7, 9 and 15 Bihar took part in Indian Peace Keeping Force operations during Operation Pawan in Sri Lanka.

In the Spring of 1999, Pakistani soldiers posing as Kashmiri militants crossed the Line of Control (LoC) in Kargil and entered Indian territory. Operation Vijay was launched by the Indian Army to flush out the intruders. More than 10,000 soldiers and officers of the Bihar Regiment were deployed to Kargil. In a well-planned operation in the Batalik sector, soldiers of 1 Bihar, in a fierce fight with the Pakistan Army, captured Point 4268 and Jubar Ridge in Kuker Thang area in the Batalik sector on the night 06/7 July 1999.

On the night of 15 June 2020, soldiers of 16 Bihar Regiment were involved in a bloody skirmish at Galwan Valley, in Ladakh along the Line of Actual Control (LAC). Twenty Indian soldiers were killed, including the commanding-officer of 16 Bihar Colonel B. Santosh Babu. According to Russian government owned TASS news agency, the fighting resulted in death of 45 Chinese soldiers. As per an American intelligence assessment the skirmish led to the death of 35 Chinese soldiers including a commanding officer.

Units of the regiment have also served in UN Peacekeeping operations in Somalia (UNOSOM), the Democratic Republic of Congo (MONUC) and Republic of South Sudan (UNMISS) in 1993, 2004, 2009, 2014 and 2022

== Deployments of units of the Bihar Regiment ==
- Burma Campaign, World War II
- Operation Zipper, World War II
- Indo-Pakistan War of 1947
- Sino-Indian War
- Indo-Pakistan War of 1965
- Indo-Pakistan War of 1971
- Operation Meghdoot
- Operation Pawan
- UNOSOM
- Kargil War
- MONUC
- Insurgency in Jammu and Kashmir
- Insurgency in Northeast India
- 2016 Indian Line of Control strike
- Sino-Indian border dispute
- 2020 China–India skirmishes
- UNMISS

== Regimental Insignia and Traditions ==
Regimental Crest

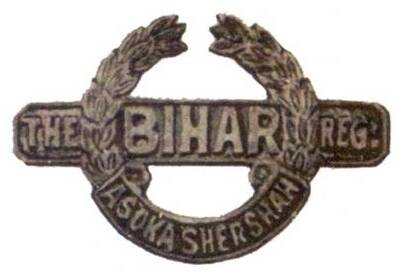
Crest of the Bihar regiment at raising

At raising, Lieutenant Colonel JRH Tweed selected an insignia that had the words “THE BIHAR REGT” in the centre with “ASOKA SHER SHAH” in a semi-circle below. Later on, when the army headquarters asked Tweed to create an emblem for the regiment, he chose one that depicted two rivers of Bihar. This was not very popular with either the officers or the men. Captain Habibullah Khan Khattak, as acting Commanding Officer, 1st Bihar Battalion (Later Major General in Pakistan Army) adopted the present crest from the three headed lions of Ashoka in 1941. In 1945, the then Governor of Bihar, Sir Thomas Rutherford when visiting 1st Bihar at Shillong was so impressed with the regimental crest, that he requested Lieutenant Colonel Khattak's permission to adopt the emblem for the Bihar Government. The Bihar Government then published gazette notification in May 1945 adopting the crest. Post Independence, the Government of India too adopted the three headed Ashoka lions as Government of India's Crest.

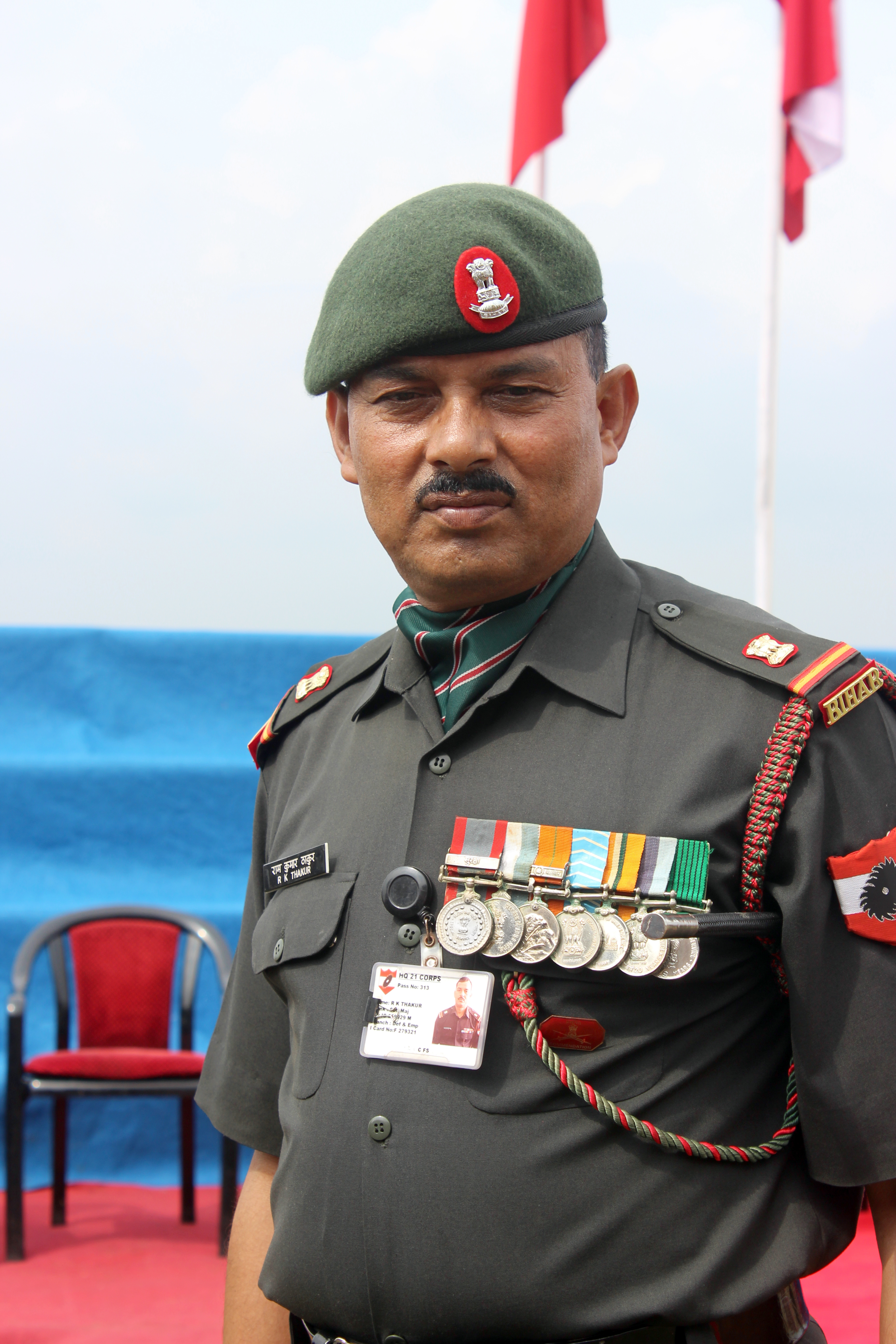
Subedar Major from Bihar Regiment

Uniform

The present uniform of the Bihar Regiment includes a red and green lanyard on the left shoulder and the shoulder title Bihar (brass / green letters over scarlet background). The green beret (common to all infantry units in India) has the regimental crest on a scarlet oval base stitched to the beret. The regimental turban is worn by personnel during ceremonial occasions, parades, on guard duty and by those in the regimental band.

Regimental Motto

In 1974, a decision was taken to formalise the motto of the Regiment as ‘Karm Hi Dharm’, which means ‘Work is Worship’. The decision was soon approved and published in Army Order No. 347/74.

War Cries

The Bihar Regiment traditionally uses two powerful war cries-

- Jai Bajrang Bali ("Victory to Bajrang Bali"—a name for Lord Hanuman)
- Birsa Munda Ki Jai ("Victory to Birsa Munda"—a revered tribal leader and folk hero)

== Bihar Regimental Centre (BRC) ==
The regimental centre was established on 1 November 1945, by Lieutenant Colonel RC Muller at Agra, following the conversion of the 3rd Training Battalion of the 19th Hyderabad Regiment's Regimental Centre. In April 1946, it relocated to Ranchi, and later that year, in November, moved to Gaya. The first Indian Commandant was Lieutenant Colonel Hardayal Singh Randhawa, who took over command in November 1947. Finally, in March 1949, it found its permanent home in Danapur, where it remains to this day.

== Units ==
Battalion	Raising Date	Nickname	Remarks	References
1st Battalion	15 September 1941		Raised at Danapur from 11/19 Hyderabad Regiment by Major JRH Tweed. It was awarded the Battle Honours Haka and Gangaw and Theatre Honour Burma during World War II. It was also awarded Battle Honour Batalik and Theatre Honour Kargil during Kargil War of 1999.	
2nd Battalion	1 December 1942		Raised at Agra.	
3rd Battalion	1 November 1945	The indomitable		
4th Battalion	1 October 1960		Raised at Danapur by Lieutenant Colonel Ajmer Singh Sidhu.	
5th Battalion	1 January 1963	High Five	Raised at Danapur by Major RL Krishnaiya.	
6th Battalion	1 October 1963	Superb Six	Raised at Danapur by Lieutenant Colonel JDB Gnanaolivu.	
7th Battalion	1 April 1964	Striking Seven	Raised by Major Deep Singh Mertia.	
8th Battalion	1 January 1965	Devipur Bn / The Gallant	Raised at Danapur by Major Balbir Singh. The first commanding officer was Lieutenant Colonel RL Krishnaiya.	
9th Battalion	15 October 1965	Navmi	Raised at Danapur by Lieutenant Colonel JS Gharaya.	
10th Battalion	1 June 1966	Ashok Chakra Paltan	Raised at Ramgarh Cantonment by Lieutenant Colonel LW Beglin. Battle honour Akhaura and Theatre Honour East Pakistan,1971.	
11th Battalion	1 June 1971	Double First Forever	Raised at Danapur by Lieutenant Colonel RK Kala.	
12th Battalion	1 January 1976		Raised at Danapur by Lieutenant Colonel Kulwant Singh Mann.	
14th Battalion	15 October 1977	The Formidables	Raised by Lieutenant Colonel ARK Reddy at Jhansi.	
15th Battalion	1 September 1980	Keep On		
16th Battalion	11 February 1985		Raised at Danapur by Major SD Salokhe.	
17th Battalion				
18th Battalion	7 November 2009		Raised at Ranchi.	
19th Battalion	29 October 2010	Uttam Unnis	Raised at Ranchi by Colonel Attri	
20th Battalion	20 November 2011	Team Twenty	Raised by Colonel Rakesh Kumar Bora at Namkum Cantonment.	
21st Battalion	20 July 1981		Raised by Lieutenant Colonel Mohammad Mansoor Mallick.	
22nd Battalion				
23rd Battalion				
4 RR Battalion	15 October 1990		Raised at Grenadiers Regimental Centre, Jabalpur under Colonel Rohitas Rajpal.	
24 RR Battalion	1 August 1994		Raised at Danapur by Colonel Umed Singh.	
47 RR Battalion	15 September 2001		Raised at Danapur by Colonel Sudhansh Ranjan.	
63 RR Battalion	30 June 2004		Raised at Danapur by Colonel Anand Bhushan.	
120 Infantry Battalion (TA)	22 August 1949	Kalinga Terriers	Raised by Lieutenant Colonel JM Shahane. Based at Bhubaneswar, Odisha.	
154 Infantry Battalion (TA)	10 September 2001	Island Terriers	Raised by Colonel RS Kaldian at Bangalore. Based at Brichgunj, Andaman and Nicobar Islands.	

== Affiliations ==
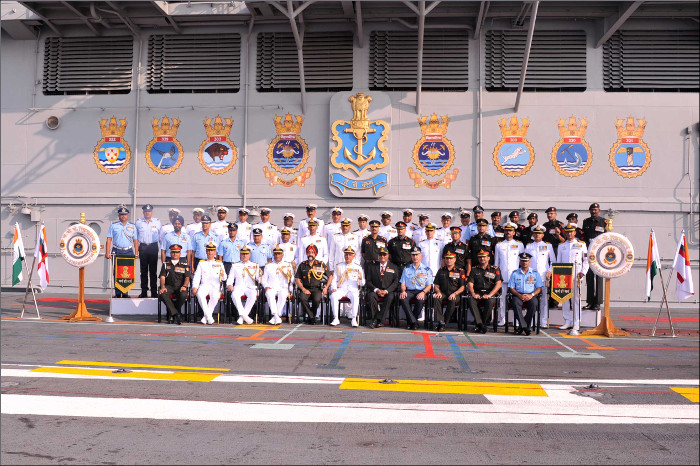
Affiliation of INS Vikramaditya with the Bihar Regiment and No. 6 Squadron, Indian Air Force

INS Vikramaditya, the Indian Navy's largest ship and one of its two aircraft carriers was affiliated to the Bihar Regiment in January 2018.

== Decorations ==
=== Theatre Honours ===
(i)	Burma	1942-45
(ii)	East Pakistan	1971
(iii)	Kargil	1999

=== Battle Honours ===
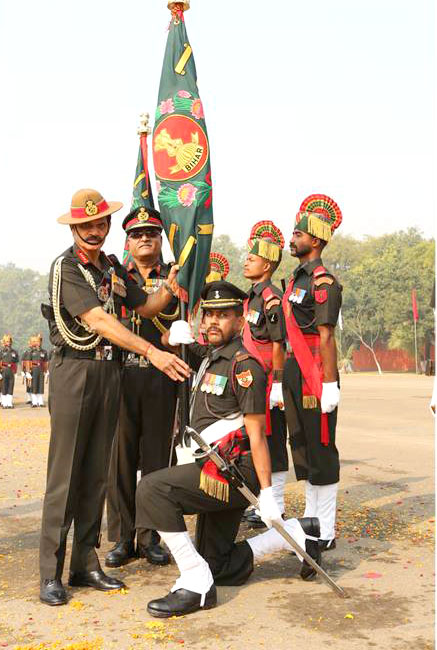
The Chief of Army Staff, General Dalbir Singh presenting the President’s Colours, at Bihar Regimental Centre, in Danapur on November 19, 2016.

(i)	Haka	Burma Campaign, World War II
(ii)	Gangaw	Burma Campaign, World War II
(iii)	Akhaura	Indo-Pakistani war of 1971
(iv)	Batalik	Kargil War 1999

=== Chief of Army Staff (COAS) Unit Citation ===
The following units were awarded the COAS unit citation-

(i)	1 BIHAR	1999
(ii)	2 BIHAR	2015, 2025
(iii)	5 BIHAR	2004
(iv)	8 BIHAR	1998, 2020
(v)	10 BIHAR	1994, 2024
(vi)	11 BIHAR	2020
(vii)	14 BIHAR	1992, 2018
(viii)	17 BIHAR	1998, 2026
(ix)	24 RR	2013
(x)	47 RR	2018

== Gallantry awards ==
The regiment is one of the highly decorated regiments of the Indian Army. The tally of awards, with prominent awardees till date are as under:-

Pre independence

- Distinguished Service Order (DSO ) - 2
  - Lieutenant Colonel John Reginald Howard Tweed
- Member of the Order of the British Empire (MBE) - 3
  - Major (temporary) Michael Sunil Chatterjee
  - Lieutenant Anil Behari Saran
- Military Cross (MC) - 5
  - Major (temporary) Kenred Vernon Mitchell
  - Captain (temporary) David Farmer
  - Lieutenant Saiyed Anwar Hasan Rizvi
  - Lieutenant (temporary Captain) (acting Major) Michael Sunil Chatterjee
  - Jemadar Nehemias
- Order of British India (OBI) - 4
- Military Medal (MM) - 02
  - Havildar Qurban Mian
  - Sepoy Louis Toppo

Post independence

- Ashoka Chakra (AC) - 4
  - Lieutenant Colonel Harsh Uday Singh Gaur, (Posthumous), 10 BIHAR, Baramulla district, 1994
  - Captain Arun Singh Jasrotia SM, (Posthumous), 8 BIHAR, later 9 Para Commando (Special Forces), 1995 Kashmir.
  - Lieutenant Colonel Shanti Swaroop Rana, (Posthumous), 3 BIHAR, Kupwara district, 1997
  - Major Sandeep Unnikrishnan, (Posthumous), 7 BIHAR (on deputation to NSG), Operation Black Tornado, 2008.
- Param Vishisht Seva Medal (PVSM) - 8
- Maha Vir Chakra (MVC) - 3
  - Brigadier (later Lieutenant General) Joginder Singh Gharaya KC, VSM, Indo-Pak War of 1971
  - Captain Gurjinder Singh Suri, (Posthumous), 12 BIHAR, Kargil War
  - Colonel B. Santosh Babu, (Posthumous), 16 BIHAR, Operation Snow Leopard
- Kirti Chakra (KC) -14
  - Captain (later Lieutenant General) Joginder Singh Gharaya, 1 BIHAR, Operation Polo, 1948
  - Jemadar Sham Bahadur Singh, (Posthumous), 2 BIHAR
  - Jemadar Sheopujan Singh, 2 BIHAR
  - Sepoy Gorakh Nath Singh, (Posthumous), 9 BIHAR
  - Captain Ajit Singh, 14 BIHAR
  - Major (later Major General) Mahavir Singh Balhara SM, 5 BIHAR
  - Captain Rakesh Rana, 14 BIHAR
  - Sepoy Gouri Shanker Sah, (Posthumous), 8 BIHAR
  - Naik Vishwa Kerketta, (Posthumous), 17 BIHAR
  - Havildar Rudal Prasad, (Posthumous), 4 BIHAR
  - Major Sushil Kumar Singh, 63 RR/ BIHAR
  - Major Anup Joseph Manjali, 24 RR/ BIHAR
- Ati Vishisht Seva Medal (AVSM) - 15
- Vir Chakra (VrC) - 19
- Shaurya Chakra (SC) - 49
- Yudh Seva Medal (YSM) - 10
- Sena Medal (SM) - 215
- Jeevan Raksha Padak - 07
- Vishisht Seva Medal (VSM) - 45
- Mention in Despatches - 56
