= Indian National Defence University =

Defence university of India

Indian Defence University
- Bhāratīya Rakṣā Viśvavidyālaya
- Other names: IDU
- Former names: Indian National Defence University
- Type: Defence Service University
- Established: 2013
- Parent institution: Ministry of Defence, Government of India
- Academic affiliations: College of Defence Management; Defence Services Staff College; National Defence Academy; National Defence College; School of Foreign Languages, New Delhi; National Cadet Corps; Army War College; Infantry School; Junior Leaders Wing; Indian Military Academy; Officers Training Academy; High Altitude Warfare School; Army Service Corps Centre and College; Army Education Corps Training Centre and College; Special Forces Training School; Corps of Military Police Training Centre and School; Army School of Physical Training; Army Airborne Training School; Institute of National Integration; Army Sports Institute; Army Cadet College; Combat Army Aviation Training School; Army Clerks Training Schools; Army School of Mechanical Transport; Army/Air Transport Support School; EME School; Military School of Music; Indian Naval Academy; Naval War College; INS Chilka (Sailors Training); INS Dronacharya (Gunnery School); INS Garuda (Aviation); INS Hamla (Logistics Training); INS Kunjali (Music Training School); INS Mandovi (Provost and Physical Training School); Naval Institute of Educational and Training Technology; ShipWright School; INS Venduruthy (Seamen Training); INS Satavahana (Submarine School); Helicopter Training School; Air Force Academy; College of Air Warfare; Tactics and Air Combat Development Establishment; Flying Instructors School; Pilot Training Establishment; Air Force Administrative College; Paratrooper's Training School; Indian Air Force Test Pilot School; TETTRA School; Air Defence College; Basic Training Institute; Mechanical Transport Training Institute; Workshop Training Institute; Air Force Police & Security Training Institute; Non-Technical Training Institute; Air Force School of Physical Fitness; Garud Regimental Training Centre
- Budget: INR
- Chancellor: Union Minister of Defence
- President: 3-star serving Lieutenant General from the Indian Army or from the equivalent Indian Navy or Indian Air Force officer
- Students: 66% from Union Defence Services, 34% from Union Civil Services.
- Location: Binola, Gurugram district, Haryana, India; 28.3115°N 76.8578°E
- Campus: 200 acres (81 ha)

Indian Defence University (abbr. IDU, ISO: Bhāratīya Rakṣā Viśvavidyālaya) is a defence service university set up for the affiliation of training academies of union government defence servants working under the Government of India. These union government defence servants can collectively be termed as generalist branch and specialist branch of the Indian Military. It is not to be confused with the Rashtriya Raksha University (RRU) which is focused on the police and para-military Central Armed Police Forces (CAPF), whereas IDU is focused on the military. It is located at Binola village in Gurugram district of Haryana state in India that is being built. It is proposed to be one of the Institutes of National Importance (INIs).

It was first proposed in 1967, but is unlikely to become operational in the foreseeable future, despite periodic optimism. As of January 2020, only the perimeter road and boundary walls have been constructed, the construction of the main building and teaching infrastructure could not commence until the "Indian National Defence University (INDU) Act, 2015" is passed, which is still awaiting approval from the Union Cabinet and the Parliament of India in the form of a draft bill.

It is located on the eastern flank of Delhi–Jaipur Expressway (NH 48), just 5 km (3.1 mi) southwest of Pachgaon Chowk on Western Peripheral Expressway, nearly 11 km (6.8 mi) southwest of National Security Guard base, 10 km (6.2 mi) northwest of Heritage Transport Museum, 26 km (16 mi) southwest of Gurugram CBD, and 43 km (27 mi) southwest of IGI International Airport. NHAI has established a bus bay for the university at NH48.

== History ==
=== Conception ===
The idea for this autonomous institution was initially conceived in 1967, strongly recommended by "Sethna Committee" in 1980 and the 1999 Kargil War Review Committee, as well as the "Group Minister's report on reforming national security system" in 2001 recommended its establishment to then Home Minister L. K. Advani, and also by K. Subrahmanyam, the proposal was approved by the Union Cabinet in 2010, Prime Minister Dr. Manmohan Singh laid the foundation stone of the Indian National Defence University (INDU) at Binola in Gurgaon on 23 May 2013. Draft bill was put online in August 2016 for the public consultation, but since then the bill is still awaiting approval from the Union Cabinet and the Parliament of India. After the extensive brainstorming with then-defence minister Arun Jaitley and other ministers, the revised bill was finalised in December 2017 and it was renamed from Indian National Defence University (INDU) to Indian Defence University (IDU). The detailed project report for the university will be prepared after it has been approved by the cabinet.

=== Act of Parliament - pending ===
As of October 2024, the draft bill was still lying with the prime minister Narendra Modi, awaiting his and cabinet's approval. India has no defense university even though such a university in India was first proposed in 1967, while Pakistan already has two defense universities. As of September 2019, there was no evidence that the university will ever open, despite earlier optimism. "The country certainly needs a 'world-class' INDU to inject some much-needed strategic culture in governance as well as encourage robust cross-linkages between the executive and academia. Almost all major countries, from the US to China, have national defence [uni]varsities (sic) to develop national security leaders as well as undertake long-term strategic studies and threat assessments."

=== Campus development ===
Once the act is passed in the parliament, IDU will be developed in phases, and the first phase will take 3 to 4 years. Meanwhile, the IDU is operating from its temporary location at Jodhpur.

== Legal framework ==
IDU will be established through an act of Parliament, it will be autonomous and not under the UGC. It will be a teaching research and affiliating university as well as a think tank.

== The university ==
=== Objectives ===
The INDU aims to undertake the following:

- Promote research-oriented national defence policy.
- High level leadership development of officers for military duties and policy formulation responsibilities
- Develop and propagate higher education in defence studies like defence management and defence science and technology.
- University think tanks for providing policy formulations inputs.

The much needed pending three reforms for the national security and military readiness are the integrated tri services operational commands under the Chief of Defence Staff, the make in India indigenous defence manufacturing, and the reform in military education in India. While some progress has been made towards the first two, but the reforms in military education in India are still lacking. The current military training in India trains officers with "narrow professional skills to command companies, battalions and brigades, or perform staff duties at various levels, there is practically no attempt to give the officers a sense of the larger contexts – strategic, political and international – in which the armed forces function. It is only at the highest training establishment, the National Defence College, that senior one-star officers get exposed to some of these issues. This is too little and too late. This outmoded approach to training impacts the quality of human capital at all levels in the services. Yet, no government has paid serious attention to this. The fate of the long-heralded Indian National Defence University is symptomatic of the political leadership's neglect of this crucial area."

=== Administration ===
This autonomous University will be instituted by the Act of the Parliament of India, and President of India will be a Visitor, and the Defence Minister will be the Chancellor. INDU will be governed as per its own norms and will be responsible to promote coordination and interaction between Institutions of Armed Forces or establishments of the country. Defence training institutions will be affiliated to award degrees.

The institute will be headed by a President, who will be a three-star serving General or equivalent officer with C-in-C status on appointment, and a Vice-President, who will be a civilian. The university formed on the lines of Indian Institutes of Technology (IIT) and Indian Institutes of Management (IIMs) will have the teaching faculty composed of military personnel and civilians in the ratio of 1:1.

=== Constituent schools ===
The university will have the following constituent units:

- Centre for Distance and Open Learning (CDOL).
- School of Defence Management (SDM).
- School of Defence Technology (SDT).
- School of National Security Studies (SNSS).
- School of Foreign Languages (SFL).

=== Affiliated institutes of Indian military ===
Following existing institutes will be affiliated to the university:

- College of Defence Management (CDM, Secunderabad, Telangana).
- Defence Services Staff College (DSSC, Wellington, Tamil Nadu).
- National Defence Academy (NDA, Khadakwasla, Maharashtra).
- National Defence College (NDC, New Delhi).
- School of Foreign Languages (SFL, New Delhi).

== Courses ==
At least 66% students will be from the Indian Armed Forces and the remaining 33% will be from the Paramilitary forces of India, Police in India and civilians. The university will offer doctoral and post-doctoral research, post-graduate studies as well as higher studies through distance learning to military and civilians.

War and peace courses will include strategic thinking, Chinese studies, Eurasian studies, Southeast Asian studies, neighborhood studies, international security and national security strategy, maritime security studies, wargaming and military simulation, joint logistics, counter-insurgency and counter-terrorism and material acquisition.

=== Courses offered presently ===
As of November 2022, IDU offers only following 3 courses by SFL (School of Foreign Languages) only from temporary campus at Jodhpur:

1. Certificate of Proficiency (COP): 1 year part time course.
2. Advance Diploma of Proficiency (ADOP): 1 year part time course for who already possess the COP.
3. Interpretership Course: full time course that ranges from 16.5 to 23.5 months long course.

== Campus ==
=== Main campus at Binola in Gurugram ===
The 205 acres and 15 marla land for the campus was acquired by the Haryana government and handed over to the Ministry of Defence in September 2012 and found stone was laid in April 2013. Of the 205 acre 15 marla land, 2 acre 3 kanal 9.5 marla was transferred to the revenue department of Haryana Government for building a road to provide access to the farmers from NH8 to their farm land, thus leaving 202 acres, 5 kanal and 5.5 marla for the university campus. However, Bhumi Puja was held in 2018 during which Air Marshal A.S. Bhonsle of Integrated Defence Staff laid the first brick for the commencement of construction of boundary wall, perimeter road, watch towers and guard rooms, construction of which has been completed as of December 2019 but the construction of buildings has not yet started, "only five to seven army officials visit the site every Sunday with two security guards looking after the area". Then Union Minister of state for defence, Subhash Bhamre, had told the Lok Sabha in 2016 that "the construction work on the project will start once the Indian National Defence University (INDU) Act, 2015, is passed by Parliament", which is still pending approval from the union cabinet and the national parliament.

=== Jodhpur temporary campus ===
Since 2018, IDU has been operating from its temporary campus at officers' hostel at Jodhpur.

== See also ==
- Army Welfare Education Society
- Education in India
- List of institutions of higher education in Haryana
- Military academies in India
- Rashtriya Raksha University
- Sainik School
