= Gurjinder Singh Suri =

Indian army officer

Captain Gurjinder Singh Suri MVC
- Born: July 4, 1974; Ambala district, Haryana, India
- Died: November 9, 1999 (aged 25); Jammu & Kashmir, India †
- Military career
- Allegiance: Republic of India
- Branch: Indian Army
- Service years: 1997–1999
- Rank: Captain
- Service number: IC-56980
- Units: Army Ordnance Corps (India); 12 Bihar Regiment
- Conflicts: Kargil War; Operation Vijay
- Awards: Maha Vir Chakra

Captain Gurjinder Singh Suri, MVC (4 July 1974 – 9 November 1999) was an Indian Army officer of 12 Battalion of Bihar Regiment who was posthumously awarded the Maha Vir Chakra, India's second highest gallantry award, for exemplary valor in combat during a gunbattle in the Faulad post attack in 1999.

== Early years and career ==
Singh was born on 4 July 1974 in the Ambala district of Haryana in a military family. He was the son of the Indian army's Lt Colonel Tej Prakash Singh Suri. Singh's grandfather Gurbaksh Singh (Subedar) was an army veteran. Singh graduated from National Defence Academy, Khadakwasla, and was commissioned to the Army Ordnance Corps on 7 June 1997.

== Faulad Post attack and death ==
Singh was killed in a gun battle in the Gulmarg, Uri sector on 9 November 1999 where the Pakistani army attacked the Faulad Post. During this battle, Manoj Kumar, Birendra Kumar, Birendra Nath Tiwari were also killed.

== Recognition and legacy ==
Captain Suri was decorated with Mahavir Chakra award posthumously on the Independence Day Gallantry Awards in 2000.

=== Maha Vir Chakra citation ===
As per the Government of India Singh's Mahavir citation is mentioned as;

Captain Gurjinder Singh Suri was the Ghatak platoon commander and was located at the forward-defended locality in Jammu & Kashmir. On 9 November 1999, the enemy launched an attack on the post, which was successfully repulsed, and the enemy retreated. Seizing the opportunity, the Ghatak platoon was ordered to pursue the fleeing enemy. Captain Suri immediately deployed his support group to take care of any reinforcement or interference and set out to clear the bunkers one by one. When he saw that one comrade was grievously injured in the process, he quickly moved on with his buddy, to clear the bunker. He killed two enemy soldiers with his AK rifle and silenced the machine gun. However, in the process, he received a burst in his left arm. Unmindful of his injury, Captain Suri continued to inspire his men to accomplish the task. He then lobbed two hand grenades into a bunker and entered inside spraying bullets with his AK rifle killing one enemy soldier instantly.

At this point, he was hit by an enemy rocket-propelled grenade and was critically wounded. He refused to be evacuated and continued to exhort his men till he died. Inspired by his leadership, the Ghataks fell upon the enemy with vengeance and annihilated them.

=== Legacy ===
A Park and a street in Ghaziabad have been named after Capt Gurjinder Singh Suri MVC in his honour.

An AWHO Residential Township in Greater Noida is also named after him in his honour.
