= Air Defence College =

Premier training institute of Indian Air Force

Coordinates: 26.654931°N 80.871831°E

Air Defence College is premier training institute of Indian Air Force and is located at Air Force Station, Memaura. The college is the country's only centre imparting advanced training to fighter controllers of the Air Force.

== Establishment and initial years ==
It was established in 1958 at Jodhpur as the Control & Reporting (C & R) School. The college trains fighter controllers of the Indian Air Force. It moved to Memaura in 1972. Control & Reporting (C & R) School was upgraded on March 15, 1980, and rechristened as the Air Defence College.

== See also ==
- Indian National Defence University
- Military Academies in India
- Sainik school
