= Army Cadet College =

Defence service for the Indian military

The Army Cadet College (ACC) is an defence service training institution, which trains defence service personnel for the Indian Army. It was established with the aim to train and induct deserving soldiers into the officer cadre.

== History ==
The foundation of ACC can be traced to the Kitchener College founded in 1929 at Nowgong, Chhatarpur, Madhya Pradesh. The Kitchener College existed till 1942. The buildings of the Kitchener College were used to accommodate the ACC, which was inaugurated on 16 May 1960, with an initial sanctioned strength of 90 cadets. In 1964, it was relocated to Ghorpuri, near Pune, to take over the campus of the erstwhile OTI (merged into OTA Madras). A decision was taken in March 1977 to move the ACC to Dehradun, to become a separate wing of Indian Military Academy (IMA). The term beginning in July 1977 thus started in the IMA. The Commandant of the IMA became the new Commandant of the ACC and the erstwhile Commandant was designated Commander, ACC wing.

== Selection and training ==
The Army Cadet College Wing trains defence service personnel of Personnel Below Officers Rank (PBOR) from the regular army, navy and air force for commissioning as officers in the Indian Army. The selection for admission to ACC is based on a CBT (computer based test), the syllabus being the same as Combined Defence Services Examination written examination and subsequent selection via Services Selection Board, followed by assessment for medical fitness. Eligible candidates must be between 22 and 27 years of age at the time of commencement of the course, completed one year of service in either of the three services and must have passed a higher secondary examination (10 + 2) from a recognised Indian board or university.

The ACC feeds into the Indian Military Academy. The nature of training at ACC and the National Defence Academy is near identical: both run a 3-year degree course in science (Bachelor of Science) and humanities (Bachelor of Arts). The added advantages that the ACC cadets bring to the Army as officers are a deep understanding of the soldier life and a consequently better appreciation of the tasking of the men. In 1974, the level of instruction was raised and the college was affiliated to Jawaharlal Nehru University, New Delhi. Following the three year course, the cadets join the Indian Military Academy as Gentlemen Cadets for a one-year Pre-Commissioning Training programme.

== Organisation ==
ACC has been renamed as the Siachen Battalion at the IMA in 2006 and is commanded by a Brigadier rank officer. It has three companies - Bogra, Kargil and Nubra. Ever year, the Commandant’s Banner is awarded to the company which excels in various competitions like sports, academics, camps and debates.

ACC has been in operation for 80 years now and has graduated some notable alumni. The first course at IMA comprising 40 GCs (Gentleman Cadets, as trainees are called) included 15 from the erstwhile Kitchener College that became the ACC. The entry criteria for ACC (which are often changed) means that most officers would retire before ever reaching the higher ranks, due to age constraints at promotion to higher ranks, irrespective of performance. Many notable officers have graduated from this institution.

== Notable alumni ==
- Lieutenant General Smith Dun MC - first sword-of-honour winner at the IMA and commander-in-chief of the Burmese Army from 4 January 1948 to 1 February 1949.
- General Muhammad Musa Khan HPk HJ HQA MBE, the 4th Commander-in-Chief of Pakistan Army from 1958 to 1966.
- Brigadier Rumel Dahiya SM - won both the Sword-of Honour as well as the gold medal in 1976.
- SK Nadal - awarded the Sword-of-Honour in 1985.
- Brigadier Dr Varghese David Abraham SM - Vice Chancellor of two Indian Universities - Oriental University, Indore and Shri Venkateshwara University, Uttar Pradesh.

== See also ==
- Indian National Defence University
- Military Academies in India
- Sainik school
