= Binola =

- village
- Location in Haryana, India Binola (India)
- Coordinates: 28.3115°N 76.8578°E
- Country: India
- State: Haryana
- District: Gurugram district

Languages
  - Official: Hindi
- Time zone: UTC+5:30 (IST)
- Postal code: 122413
- Telephone code: +91-01246-XXXXXX
- Website: haryana.gov.in

Binola is a village in Gurgaon district of Indian state of Haryana. It is 8 km from Manesar, 23 km from Gurgaon and 1 km south of junction of NH48 with KMP Expressway. Indian Defence University (IDU) and Starex University are based at Binola.

== Demography ==
Binola had 834 people in 201 household as per 2011 census of India.

== Education ==
Indian National Defence University (INDU) is being established here by the Government of India on Delhi-Jaipur NH 48, based on the recommendations of the Kargil War Review Committee, foundation stone was laid by the Prime Minister Dr. Manmohan Singh at Binola on 23 May 2013. It is expected to be functional from 2018 to 2019.

Starex University is already operating from Binola.

== Economy ==
Binola is a small industrial area south of Gurgaon on NH48 with small factories. It has some warehouses due to its proximity to Delhi and ease of access from NH48 for transshipment or delivery to nearby towns in NCR region.

It has direct approach from National Highway No. 8. Few name of the companies which have existence and running successfully here are:

· Shivam Autotech

· ZAVENIR DAUBERT

· Shriram Finance

· OM Logistics

· Bajaj Automobiles

· Mark Exhaust Pvt. Ltd.

· Mangal Pvt. Ltd.

· Bisleri ETC.

There is a private bank HDFC running into the industrial township too.
