= Harsh Uday Singh Gaur =

Indian military officer

Lieutenant Colonel Harsh Uday Singh Gaur AC
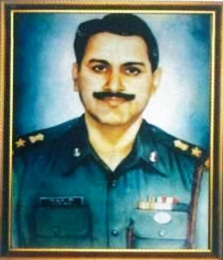
- Portrait of Lt Col Harsh Uday Singh Gaur
- Born: 1 July 1953; Hardoi, Uttar Pradesh
- Died: 29 November 1994 (aged 41); Dajipura Village, Baramulla, Jammu and Kashmir
- Military career
- Allegiance: India
- Branch: Indian Army
- Service years: 1974- 1994
- Rank: Lieutenant Colonel
- Service number: SS-27314 (short-service commission); IC-36177 (regular commission)
- Unit: 10 Bihar Regiment
- Awards: Ashok Chakra

Harsh Udai Singh Gaur (1 July 1953 – 29 November 1994) was an Indian military officer posted as commanding officer of 10 Bihar Regiment.

== Army career ==
Gaur was born in 1953 in Hardoi district of Uttar Pradesh. His father's name was Rajendra Singh Gaur. He completed his education in his hometown and graduated in 1972 from C.M Nehru college. Gaur joined the Officers Training Academy in September 1973 and received a short-service commission as a second lieutenant in the Bihar Regiment on 12 May 1974. Promoted lieutenant on 12 May 1975, on 12 May 1979 he received a regular commission as a second lieutenant with a promotion to lieutenant (seniority from 9 July 1977). Gaur was promoted captain on 9 July 1981.

Promoted major on 9 July 1986, he also joined in Defence Services Staff College and served as an instructor in the infantry school. Gaur was posted as acting Lieutenant Colonel of 10 Bihar Battalion deployed at Baramulla district of Jammu and Kashmir in 1994.

== Operation Baramulla ==
On 29 November 1994, his unit received information from the intelligence sources about 15 to 17 terrorists in Bazipora village of Baramulla district and he planned a cordon operation in the area. He decided to lead the operation himself. While the search operation was going on, the terrorists fired at the troops. Despite the heavy exchange of fire, he kept moving forward and killed All terrorists. However, Gaur was seriously injured and give supreme sacrifice to the nation .

== Award ==
In 1995 Gaur was posthumously awarded the India's highest peacetime gallantry award, Ashoka Chakra for his extraordinary courage, dedication to duty and supreme sacrifice.
