= Joginder Singh Gharaya =

Recipient of Maha Vir Chakra

Lieutenant-General Joginder Singh Gharaya MVC, KC, VSM
- Born: 31 July 1926; Montgomery, Montgomery District, Punjab Province, British Raj (present-day Sahiwal, Pakistan)
- Died: 13 July 2019 (aged 92); Chandigarh, India
- Military career
- Allegiance: British India; India
- Branch: British Indian Army; Indian Army
- Service years: 1946–1984
- Rank: Lieutenant-General
- Service number: IC-1984
- Units: Frontier Force Regiment; 1 Bihar Regiment
- Commands: Director-General, Infantry; 9th Infantry Division; 7th Infantry Division; 42nd Infantry Brigade
- Conflicts: Operation Polo; Indo-Pakistani War of 1965; Indo-Pakistani War of 1971
- Awards: Maha Vir Chakra; Kirti Chakra; Vishisht Seva Medal

Lieutenant-General Joginder Singh Gharaya MVC, KC, VSM (31 July 1926 – 13 July 2019) was a highly decorated Indian Army general and the only member of the Indian Armed Forces to have been awarded both the Maha Vir Chakra and the Kirti Chakra, the second highest wartime and peacetime Indian decorations.

== Early life ==
Born in Montgomery in the Punjab Province (now Sahiwal, Pakistan). He did his schooling from King George Royal Indian Military College(now Rashtriya Military School Chail) and received an emergency commission as a second lieutenant in the Frontier Force Regiment on 20 January 1946, transferring to the Bihar Regiment following the independence and partition of India, when the Frontier Force Regiment was allocated to Pakistan.

== Decorated officer ==
While serving with the 1st Battalion, Bihar Regiment during Operation Polo in 1948, Gharaya was awarded the Kirti Chakra (then named the Ashoka Chakra, Class II). The official citation reads:

The President is pleased to approve the award of the Ashoka Chakra, Class II, to the undermentioned personnel for acts of conspicuous gallantry in the Hyderabad Police Action - 1948.

Captain Jogindra (sic) Singh Gharaya (IC-1984), 1 Bn. The Bihar Regiment.

On 24 September 1948, Capt. Gharaya while proceeding with his Company to village Puchanapet was suddenly fired upon by two truck loads of Razakars who then made away. Capt. Gharaya immediately engaged them from his jeep and, followed closely by some of his men in a truck, he gave chase. Although constantly under fire, he kept up the chase and returned fire. Eventually, he managed to shoot down two Razakars. Later, the driver too was killed and the truck halted. The Razakars, however, took up positions and continued the fight. Captain Gharaya then with one Section only, charged the Razakars, killing twelve. Six .303, six Henry Martini (sic) rifles and one pistol were captured.

Throughout this action, as well as on numerous other occasions during the Police Action, Capt. Gharaya showed great leadership, courage and initiative in rounding up armed Razakars. His utter disregard for his personal safety coupled with his cheerfulness were an inspiration and example to all who came in contact with him.

As a lieutenant-colonel, in 1969 Gharaya was awarded the Vishisht Seva Medal (VSM) for "distinguished service of a high order." On 20 January 1971, he was given command of a mountain brigade with the acting rank of brigadier. During the Indo-Pakistani War of 1971, Gharaya commanded the 42nd Brigade of the 9th Division, assigned to liberate south-western Bangladesh. In November 1971, 14 Punjab and a squadron of 45 Cavalry from his formation captured the Boyra salient, successfully defending it against four counter-attacks by the Pakistan Army's 107 Brigade, destroying or capturing 14 enemy Chaffee tanks in the process. Inspiring his troops while at the front, Gharaya's superb tactical handling was a significant contributor in securing a lodgement for a planned offensive. On 6 December, he personally led his brigade in an offensive in the Jessore Sector, during which he was severely wounded and was awarded the Maha Vir Chakra (MVC). The official citation reads as follows:

The President is pleased to approve the award of the Maha Vir Chakra for acts of conspicuous gallantry in the recent operations against Pakistan to:

Brigadier Joginder Singh Gharaya (IC-1984), KC, VSM.

(Effective date of award - 6th December 1971)

Brigadier J.S. Gharaya was commanding an infantry brigade in the Eastern Front in the Jessore Sector on 6 December 1971. His brigade was attacked on four successive occasions and despite heavy casualties, his troops stood the ground due largely to his excellent tactical handling, outstanding courage, constant presence and guidance. His conduct of this operation was responsible for heavy enemy losses and their withdrawal. During the subsequent offensive operations, Brigadier Gharaya was with the leading troops when he was severely wounded by enemy fire. He refused to be evacuated till he had seen the attack through as the success of this attack was vital to our further advance in Bangladesh.

Throughout this operation, Brigadier Gharaya conducted himself with extraordinary courage and through his personal example inspired such spirit and confidence among troops that led to the complete success of the difficult operations.

== Later career ==
Gharaya was promoted to substantive major general on 30 December 1976 (seniority from 1 March 1976), and subsequently commanded both the 9th and 7th Infantry Divisions. He was promoted to lieutenant-general on 1 July 1982 (seniority from 30 March 1981), and served as Chief of Staff, Central Command before his final appointment as Director-General, Infantry, from which post he retired from the Army in 1984.

Gharaya died at Chandigarh in the morning of 13 July 2019, aged 92.

== Honours and awards ==

Maha Vir Chakra	Kirti Chakra	Vishisht Seva Medal	
Wound Medal	Samanya Seva Medal	Samar Seva Star	Poorvi Star
Raksha Medal	Sangram Medal	Sainya Seva Medal	Indian Independence Medal
25th Anniversary of Independence Medal	30 Years Long Service Medal	20 Years Long Service Medal	9 Years Long Service Medal

== Dates of rank ==
Insignia	Rank	Component	Date of rank
	Second Lieutenant	British Indian Army	20 January 1946 (emergency)
	Second Lieutenant	Indian Army	15 August 1947 (Note: Upon independence in 1947, India became a Dominion within the British Commonwealth of Nations. As a result, the rank insignia of the British Army, incorporating the Tudor Crown and four-pointed Bath Star ("pip"), was retained, as George VI remained Commander-in-Chief of the Indian Armed Forces. After 26 January 1950, when India became a republic, the President of India became Commander-in-Chief, and the Ashoka Lion replaced the crown, with a five-pointed star being substituted for the "pip."); 20 October 1947 (substantive)
	Lieutenant	Indian Army	31 July 1949
	Lieutenant	Indian Army	26 January 1950 (recommissioning and change in insignia)
	Captain	Indian Army	20 October 1952
	Major	Indian Army	20 October 1959
	Lieutenant-Colonel	Indian Army	13 July 1965 (seniority from 19 June 1965)
	Colonel	Indian Army	28 June 1972
	Brigadier	Indian Army	20 January 1971 (acting); 2 January 1974 (substantive, with seniority from 12 July 1973)
	Major General	Indian Army	30 December 1976 (seniority from 1 March 1976)
	Lieutenant-General	Indian Army	1 July 1982 (seniority from 30 March 1981)
