= Services Selection Board =

Indian Armed Forces organization

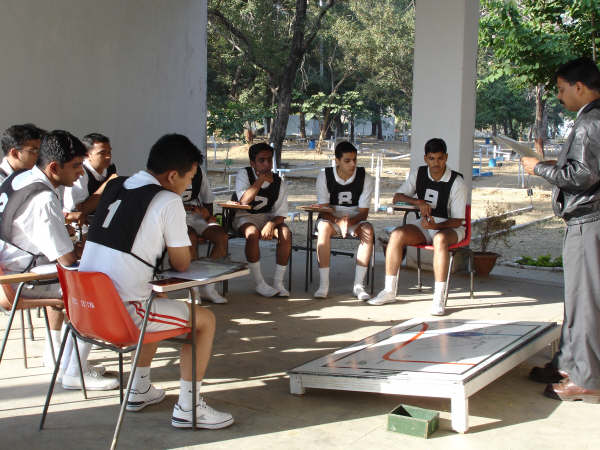
Candidates in a group task

Services Selection Board (SSB) is an organization that conducts interviews for defense aspirants who want to serve in the Indian Armed Forces. This interview consists of an intensive five-day evaluation process. The board evaluates the candidate's suitability for officer roles using a standardized evaluation system that includes intelligence tests and personality interviews. The tests consist of oral, practical, and written tasks. SSB is a panel of assessors who are officers in the Indian Armed Forces, as Psychologists, Group Testing Officers (G.T.O), and Interviewing Officers. The psychologists may or may not be directly coming from the armed forces. Presently, there are fourteen Service Selection Board centers across India, out of which four boards are for the Indian Army, five boards are for the Indian Navy, and five boards are for the Indian Air Force.

== Introduction ==
SSB centers were the primary agencies for testing and selecting all the candidates aspiring to become officers in the Indian armed forces or civil services. Soon after independence, the Indian government set up a separate UPSC selection system since the Indian Armed Forces did not require an elaborate standard passing procedure. There are a variety of pathways for being commissioned as an officer in the Indian Armed Forces. This applies to both civilians (after 10+2, graduation, and post-graduation) as well as to serving armed forces personnel, except that Army Medical Corps members must pass the "SSB interview". The NDA/NA UPSC and Pilot Aptitude Battery Test (P.A.B.T) for the Indian Air Force can only be attempted by an individual once in a lifetime. However, the attempts for the SSB interview are unlimited. The interview involves a battery of psychological tests based on personality for assessing the candidate's suitability for induction into the armed forces.

The tests help the SSB select candidates with officer-like qualities ("OLQs"). The Services Selection Board is not concerned with the number of commissions available. Its responsibility is just to assess and then recommend. Successful candidates will be given a medical examination and, if satisfactory, will be recorded on a "merit list" before training and getting commissioned. The merit list doesn't consider the medical results, but to get an invitation letter for joining the academy based on the number of vacancies available, being medically fit is extremely mandatory. The selection occurs over a five-day process. Day 1 - screening test, day 2 - psychological evaluation, days 3 and 4 - group tests, and day 5 - a compilation of results in a conference. A personal interview is also included during the selection period. The qualities looked for in the selection period include intellect, responsibility, initiative, judgment under stress, ability to reason and organize, communication skills, determination, courage, self-confidence, speed in decision making, willingness to set an example, compassion, and a feeling of loyalty to the nation. The candidates are billeted during the selection period, and they are ordered to complete the assessment in a group with other candidates. Observations of the group are extremely consistent.

== Procedure ==
The candidates who have passed the Union Public Service Commission (UPSC) written examination. In the case of the Territorial Army, those who have been recommended by a Preliminary Interview Board (PIB) or who have been asked to present to the Service Selection Board are allocated an SSB center for attending the interview. Service candidates attend via movement orders made by their superiors. Various entries, such as the NCC special entry and the technical entry scheme, get direct recommendation letters for attending the SSB interview. The selection is based on the concept of Manasa, vacha, and karmana. The personality of the candidates is observed by the officers using various tests, such as GTO-based tasks, interviews, and psychological tests. There are no right or wrong answers in the SSB interview, as all individuals act differently in the same situation. The aim is to assess whether the candidate will be the right fit for becoming an officer in any branch of the Indian Armed Forces.

=== Reporting day ===
On this day, the candidate should report, and he/she should follow the instructions as mentioned in the SSB call-up letter. Generally, the candidate has to report at the railway station in the morning between 5 AM and 6 AM, and from there, candidates are escorted to board one of the SSB officials. On the very same day, candidates are made to sit in the testing hall where they have to present their educational documents for verification, and are allotted a number (chest number) by which they will be able to identify the candidates throughout the process. A briefing about the schedule, various tests, and general instructions shall be given.

=== Day 1: Screening test – Stage I ===
On Day 1, stage one of testing is administered. This includes Officer Intelligence Rating Test (O.I.R) which is a verbal and non-verbal intelligence test (about 50 questions each) and Picture Perception & Description Test (P.P.D.T) which is a test that consists of a picture that is clear or blurred is shown to the candidates for 30 seconds. Each candidate should observe it and, in the next minute, must record the number of characters seen in the picture. Then, within a given time each candidate should not just describe the picture, they must write nearly seventy words and make a story from the picture. The candidate must record the approximate age, gender and mood of the first character they saw, known as the "main character". In stage two of the PPDT, the candidates are given their stories, which they may revise. Each candidate in the group must narrate his or her story within one minute. The group is then asked to create a common story involving each of them or their perceived picture stories. After the completion of these tests, the candidates who are short-listed will remain and are instructed to appear for the upcoming tests. While the unsuccessful candidates are sent back to their homes.

=== Day 2: Psychology test – Stage II ===
On Day 2, the Thematic Apperception Test (TAT), a picture-based story-writing test similar to the picture perception and description test, is administered, using clear pictures. Again, the candidates are shown a picture for 30 seconds and then write a story over the next 4 minutes. Twelve such pictures are displayed sequentially. The last picture is a blank slide inviting the candidates to write a story of their choice. Candidates do not need to remember the number of characters in each picture, and there is no group discussion. The next test will be the Word Association Test (WAT). The candidates are shown sixty simple everyday words in sequence. Each candidate is shown for fifteen seconds. For each word, the candidates write the first thought that comes to mind in response to the word. Another test administered on day two will be the Situation Reaction Test (SRT). A booklet of 60 situations is presented in which the responses are to be completed in 30 minutes, and finally, the Self-Description Test (SDT), which consists of 5 questions asking about parents', teachers'/employers', friends', and the candidates' own perception.

=== Day 3, 4: Group tests and personal interview – Stage III ===
On days 3 and 4, a Group test is conducted by a GTO (Group Testing Officer). There are tasks including group discussion, group (military) planning exercises, progressive group tasks, small (half) group tasks, individual tasks (obstacles), group obstacle or "snake race", command tasks; a lecture with four heads; two group discussions on current as well as on social and personal topics, and a final group task. Along with GTO, an individual candidate-based interview is conducted by the interviewing officer. It is based on the personal information questionnaires filled out by the candidates on day 1 and other defense-related general knowledge questions.

=== Day 5: Assessment and results (final stage) ===
On the final day, all the retired officers in proper uniform will attend a conference with the candidates who completed the previous interview tasks. They will also have a conversation with a panel of assessors. The assessors will look for confidence and expression when speaking, a positive attitude with honesty in adversity, and life. Following this, the final results are announced. Successful candidates will be assigned to a military hospital to undergo an intensive medical examination, which takes four to five days.

== Pilot Aptitude Battery Test (PABT – Once in a Lifetime Test) ==
Pilot Aptitude Battery Test (P.A.B.T) is administered to candidates hoping to join the flying branches under the Indian Army, Indian Navy, Indian Air Force, and Indian Coast Guard. This test is conducted during the SSB interview. Candidates shall sit and attend this test only once. This test includes the Instrument Battery Test, a Sensory Motor Apparatus Test (S.M.A.T), and a Control Velocity Test (CVT). More recently, the " Computerised Pilot Selection System" (CPSS) has been used. It was created by the former President of India, Dr. A.P.J. Abdul Kalam, in collaboration with the Defense Institute of Psychological Research and the Air Defense Establishment, both groups within the Defense Research and Development Organization. It was developed to determine aptitude for using intellect concerning advanced aircraft. The CPSS machine simulates an aircraft cockpit. The candidate should play three games and be able to produce the best score. It tests hands, legs, vision, and hearing coordination.

== Instrument Battery Test ==
The Instrument Battery Test (IBT) is a paper, pencil, and machine-based test. It has two parts. The candidate must listen to a briefing and then interpret the dials of an aircraft's instrument panel. If the candidate does well, they proceed to the machine part of the test. The machine test includes the Sensory Motor Apparatus Test (S.M.A.T.) and the Control Velocity Test (C.V.T.), which examine a candidate's coordination. The tests are administered in one day, and candidates may only ever attempt the tests once.

== Indian Coast Guard Selection Board ==
The Indian Coast Guard (ICG) is part of the Ministry of Defence. ICG officer selection is similar to SSB and is conducted in two phases. Phase 1 is called the Preliminary Selection Board Exam (PBS), which is similar to the SSB screening stage. Phase 2, the Final Selection Board, includes psychological tests, group tasks, a personal interview, and an assessor's conference. Shortlisted candidates proceed to a later test.

== See also ==
- List of Public Service Commissions in India
