= Computerised Pilot Selection System =

The Computerised Pilot Selection System is used for screening candidates into the flight branch of the Indian Air Force. It replaced the earlier pilot selection test named Pilot Aptitude Battery Test (PABT). It was originally conceived by then Scientific Advisor to the Prime Minister Dr. APJ Abdul Kalam with a view to adopt a better tool for conducting pilot aptitude test in consonance with the modern aircraft of the IAF. It has been developed jointly by Aeronautical Development Establishment, Bangalore and Defence Institute of Psychological Research, Delhi.
