= Triveni Singh =

Ashoka Chakra recipient

Lieutenant Triveni Singh AC
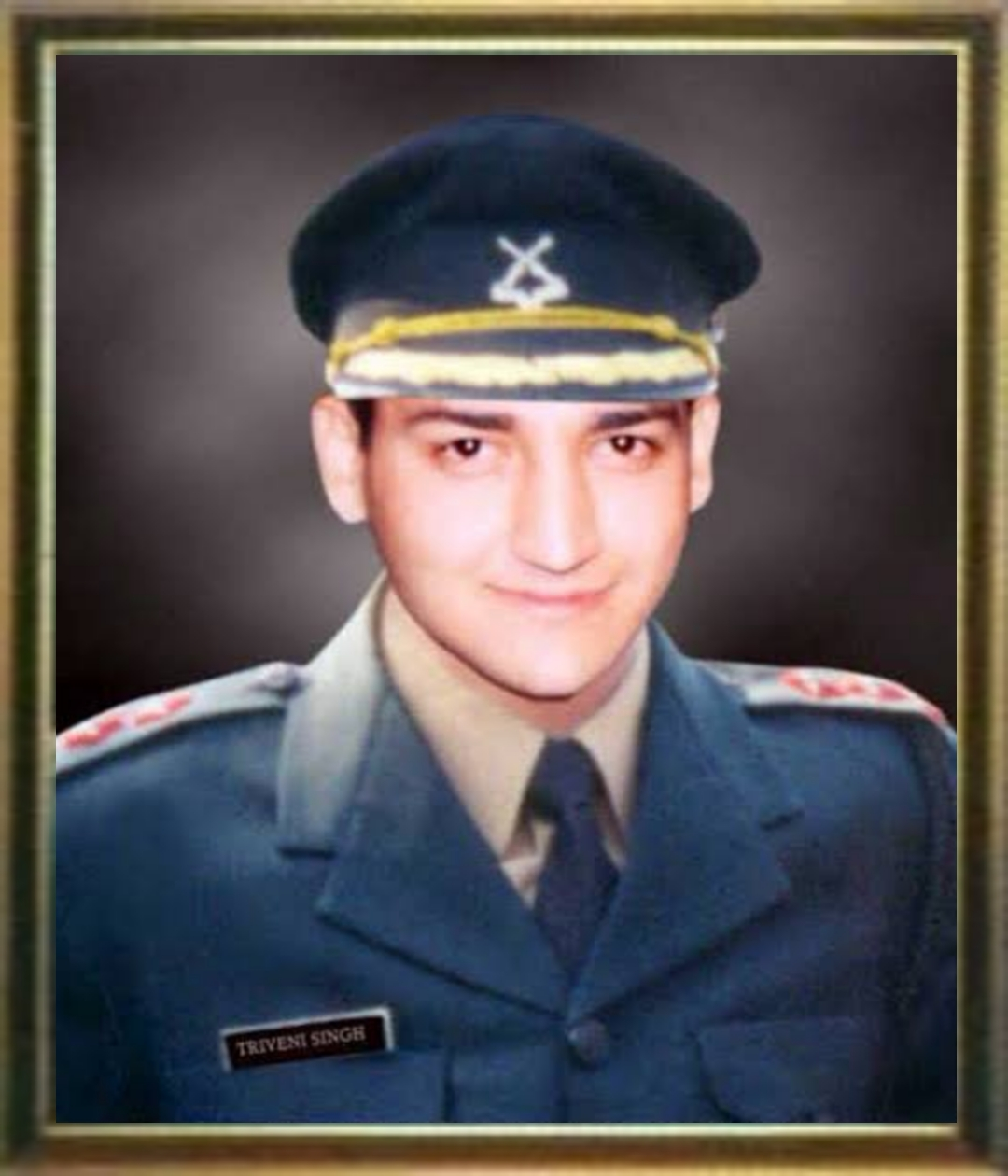
- Portrait of Lt Triveni Singh
- Born: 1 February 1978; Namkum Jharkhand
- Died: 2 January 2004 (aged 25); Jammu Jammu and Kashmir
- Military career
- Allegiance: India
- Branch: Indian Army
- Service years: 2001-2004
- Rank: Lieutenant
- Service number: IC- 61417
- Unit: 5 Jammu and Kashmir Light Infantry
- Awards: Ashok Chakra

Lieutenant Triveni Singh (Note: Hindi: Trivenī Siṅgh, pronounced [trɪʋeːniː sɪŋɡʱ]) (1 February 1978 – 2 January 2004) was an Officer of the Indian Army from 5 Jammu and Kashmir Light Infantry and was posthumously awarded the Ashok Chakra Award, India's highest peacetime award, for his actions in the terrorist attack on Jammu Railway Station on 2 January 2004.

Triveni Singh was the adjutant of his unit and was in the room adjoining the commanding officer's office when information about the terrorist attack at Jammu Railway Station came in. Though he was not required to attend the call (he was asked by the commanding officer to alert the officers and the soldiers on duty at the barracks to move to the railway station) Triveni requested to be allowed to lead the Quick Reaction Team to tackle the terrorists. His body was found six inches away from the last terrorist that he killed.

== Terrorist attack ==
Lt. Triveni Singh killed two heavily armed militants at the Jammu railway station on 2 January 2004, and saved hundreds of passengers at the platform before he succumbed to his injuries. On the evening of 2 January 2004, Singh saw the news of the fidayeen attack on the Jammu railway station while watching a TV news bulletin. Following orders, Singh rushed to the Jammu railway station with five soldiers. In a swift action, he killed the first militant and followed the other who was firing from the overhead rail bridge. Singh knew that the hidden militant was equipped with lethal weapons and could kill over 300 passengers who had taken refuge in the parcel room only a short distance away. Singh grabbed that militant and engaged in hand-to-hand combat when a burst of fire knocked him down. He killed the third terrorist but received a fatal injury as well.

Before dying Lt. Triveni Singh saluted his GOC, Maj. General Rajendra Singh. His last words were "Mission accomplished, Sir". Lt. Triveni Singh was posthumously awarded the Ashok Chakra, the country's highest bravery award during peacetime for displaying conspicuous gallantry. President APJ Abdul Kalam presented the award to Lt. Triveni Singh's father, Captain Janmej Singh (retired) during the 2004 Republic Day parade.

== Early life ==
Hailing from Pathankot, Punjab and born on 1 February 1978, at Namkum, now in Jharkhand, Triveni Singh, a Dogra, was not an aggressive child and never used to react to provocations. His parents recall that they decided to train Singh, their only son, in martial arts and bodybuilding when he turned 15. He won a gold medal at the national level in martial arts. He also won gold medals in swimming and athletics. Singh wanted to join the Army despite being an agriculture graduate from the Punjab Agriculture University, Ludhiana. After clearing his examinations with high rankings he went to the Indian Military Academy, Dehradun. He was commissioned in the Army on 8 December 2001, and joined the elite unit of 5 Jammu and Kashmir Light Infantry, reputed for its bravery and decorations in the Indian Army. He was sent to the Infantry School, Mhow for the Young Officers Basic Course and Commando Course.

== Award ceremony ==
Singh's father accepted the medal on his behalf on 26 January 2004.

== In popular culture ==
- In 2023 a short film Rakshak- India's Braves was released on Amazon Mini TV where Varun Mitra played the role of Triveni Singh.
