= Air Officer in Charge of Administration =

Air Officer In Charge Administration or AOA, is a staff role in some air forces, at various organisational levels. The role of AOA emerged in the Royal Air Force and is most often found in the air forces of the Commonwealth of Nations.

== India ==
In India, Air Officer in Charge of Administration, one of the Principal Staff Officers to the Chief Of Air Staff. The post is occupied by an Air Marshal of the Administration Branch of the Indian Air Force. The AOA is generally either an Air Traffic Controller or Fighter Controller or a pure Administration Branch Officer.
