= Arun Singh Jasrotia =

Indian military officer

Captain Arun Singh Jasrotia AC, SM
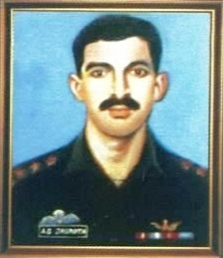
- Portrait of Capt Arun Singh Jasrotia, AC, SM
- Born: 16 August 1968; Sujanpur, Pathankot, Punjab, India
- Died: 15 September 1995 (aged 27); Lolab Valley, Kupwara, Jammu and Kashmir, India
- Military career
- Allegiance: India
- Branch: Indian Army
- Service years: 1988 - 1995
- Rank: Captain
- Service number: IC-48171K
- Units: 9 Para (Special Forces); 8 Bihar
- Conflicts: Operation Rakshak
- Awards: Ashoka Chakra; Sena Medal

Captain Arun Singh Jasrotia, AC, SM (16 August 1968 – 15 September 1995) was an Indian Army officer in the 9 Para (Special Forces). He was posthumously awarded the Ashoka Chakra, the highest peace time military decoration in India. He was also recipient of Sena Medal. He was also posthumously conferred with the Nishan-E-Khalsa by the Punjab State Government (India).

On 15 September 1995, terrorists attacked Jasrotia's team in Lolab Valley in Jammu and Kashmir. In retaliation, Jasrotia killed a terrorist with his knife and lobbed grenades at others. Besides killing three terrorists with gunshots in the firefight that ensued, he single handedly killed a terrorist grabbing him in a hand to hand combat, slicing him with his knife despite bleeding profusely and unmindful of his pain.Ignoring the pain in his chest and blood seeping from his right shoulder, he got into hand to hand fight with another terrorist, knifing the man through his stomach and ripping him open.This gave his team an opportunity to eliminate the remaining terrorists. Jasrotia sustained gunshot wounds and succumbed to the injuries.

== Early life ==
Arun Singh Jasrotia was born in Sujanpur in the Pathankot district of Punjab, India on 16 August 1968. He was son of an army veteran Lt Col Prabhat Singh Jasrotia and Satya Devi. His grandfather too served in the army and retired as a Lt Col with 2 Dogra Regiment.

== Military career ==
Capt Arun also had a dream to wear army uniform like his father and grandfather and followed his dream by joining NDA after completing his schooling at Kendriya Vidyalaya No. 1, in Pathankot. He was commissioned into 8 Bihar Regiment on 17 December 1988 as a second lieutenant, with promotion to lieutenant on 17 December 1990 and to captain on 17 December 1993.

During his initial service, Capt Arun took part in "Op Rakshak" under 8 Mountain Division and 28 Inf Div sector and proved his mettle as a professional and committed soldier. He was awarded Sena Medal for his exceptional service and devotion to duty. Later Capt Arun volunteered for 9 Para (Special Forces).

== Lolab Valley Operation ==
During his initial service, Capt Arun took part in "Op Rakshak" under 8 Mountain Division and 28 Inf Div sector and proved his mettle as a professional soldier. He was awarded Sena Medal for his exceptional service. Later Capt Arun was inducted into 9 Para (Special Forces) a unit known for daredevil operations in demanding situations.

Capt Arun along with his troops set off to an arduous climb towards the suspected hideout. After about nearly ten hours the team reached the general area at a height approximately 3000 meters in the Lolab Valley of Jammu & Kashmir. As the team came closer to the cave, they were attacked by the militants from well-entrenched positions. Captain Arun, having realized the situation decided to face the terrorists himself and killed one with his commando knife. He killed one more terrorist with a hand grenade and lunged forward towards the cave.

While moving forward towards the cave Capt Arun got hit by a bullet in the shoulder and was grievously injured. But he refused to move back and in a rare show of courage, shot dead the terrorist who had fired at him. When he reached near the cave, he was hit by two more bullets in the gut and chest and collapsed. Inspired by his bravery and leadership, the troops attacked the militants with double vigour and aggression and eliminated all of them. Capt Arun was martyred and he was awarded the nation's highest peace time gallantry award "Ashok Chakra" for his outstanding courage, devotion to duty and supreme sacrifice. Punjab government also conferred Captain Arun Singh Jasrotia with the Nishan-e-Khalsa Award in 1999. Capt Arun Singh Jasrotia is survived by his parents Lt Col Prabhat Singh Jasrotia and Mrs Satya Devi.
