= Air Force Administrative College =

Training institute of the Indian Air Force

Coordinates: 11.0080266°N 76.9823867°E

Air Force Administrative College (AFAC), located at Coimbatore, is one of the oldest training institutes of the Indian Air Force (IAF).

== Courses offered ==
College conducts following courses for in service officers:

- Basic Air Typing Staff Course : Officers (BASCO)
- Intermediate Air Typing Staff Course : Officers (ISCO)
- Basic Professional Knowledge Course : Officers (BPKC)
- Advanced Professional Knowledge Course : Officers (APKC)
- Para Legal Course
- Basic ground conversion of pilots

The college also conducts Meteorology branch related courses:

- Initial Forecasters' Course (IFC)
- Advanced Met Courses for Met Tradesmen (SNCOs)
- 2nd Stage Training of GDOC (Met)

== See also ==
- Indian National Defence University
- Military Academies in India
- Sainik school
