= Cadet =

Trainee or candidate to become a military officer

A cadet is a student or trainee within various organisations, primarily in military contexts where individuals undergo training to become commissioned officers. However, several civilian organisations, including civil aviation groups, maritime organisations, and police services, also designate their auxiliary members and trainees as cadets.

== Armed forces ==
In several military services, cadets, flight cadets, officer cadets, and gentleman/lady cadets may refer to recruits and students that are undergoing military training to become commissioned officers. The specific rank structure and responsibilities of cadets can vary among different military organisations.

=== Australia ===
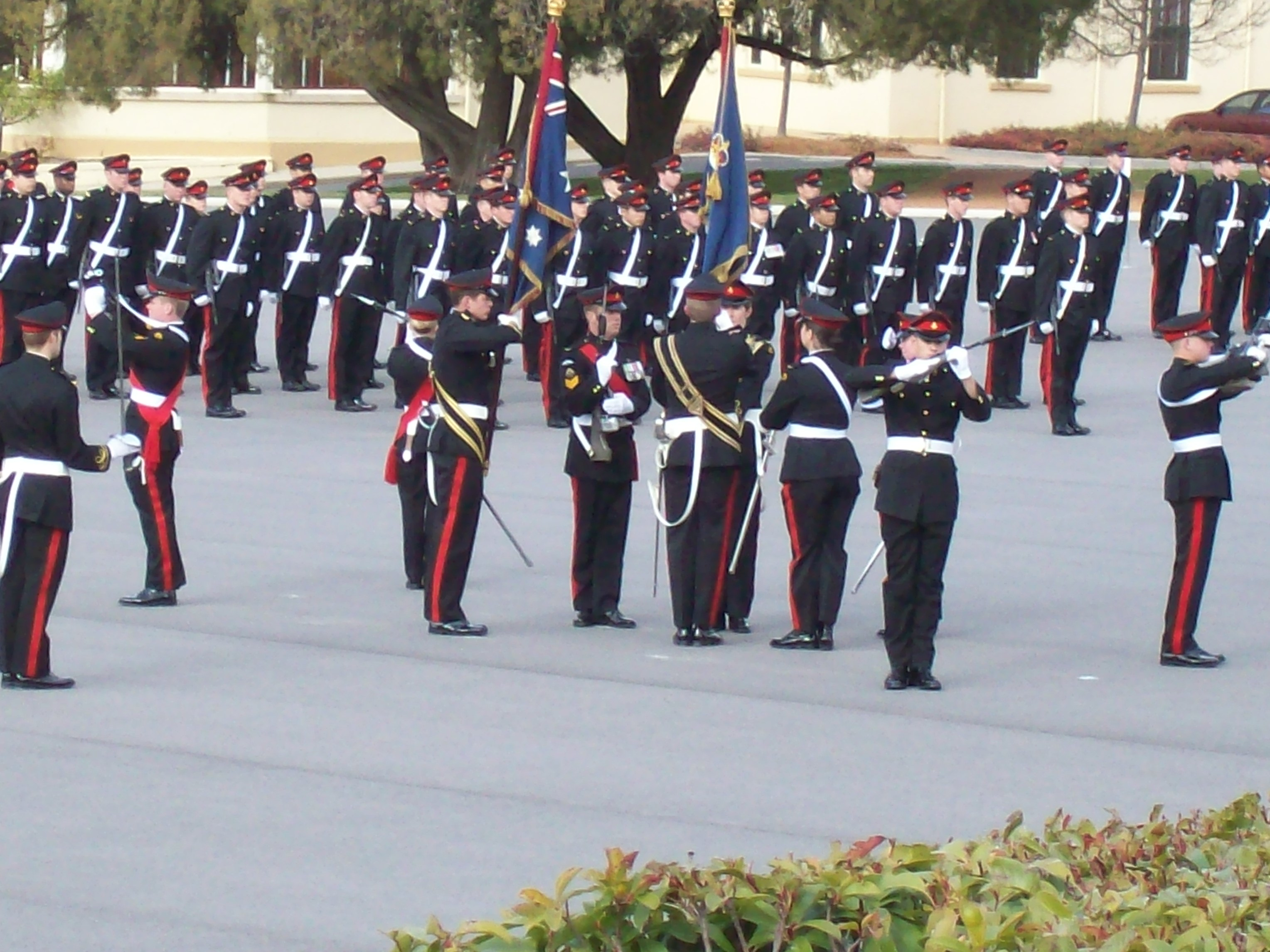
Graduation parade for Australian officer cadets of Royal Military College, Duntroon

In Australia, a cadet is an officer in training. The official rank is Officer Cadet (OCDT for members of the Australian Regular Army and OFFCDT for members of the Royal Australian Air Force), but OCDTs in the Royal Military College, Duntroon are referred to as staff cadet (Scdt) for historical reasons.

=== Austria-Hungary ===
In Austria-Hungary, the cadets of the Austro-Hungarian Army (1867–1918) wore the Feldwebel rank insignia on the gorget patch. The characteristic of the cadet ranks was the so-called distinction-galloon on the sleeve ends. It was similar to the feldwebel-galloon, however, from gold colour instead of emperor-yellow. The particular rank was added as well.

=== Bangladesh ===
A trainee of the Bangladesh Army, Bangladesh Navy, and Bangladesh Air Force is called 'Officer Cadet' during their stay in the Bangladesh Military Academy, Bangladesh Naval Acdemy and Bangladesh Air Force Academy. Additionally, students of Cadet Colleges are also considered as 'Cadet' while they undergo with elementary military training from Grade 7 to 12. There are 12 cadet colleges in Bangladesh, nine for men and three for women. The first cadet college was Faujdarhat Cadet College, established in 1958.

=== Canada ===
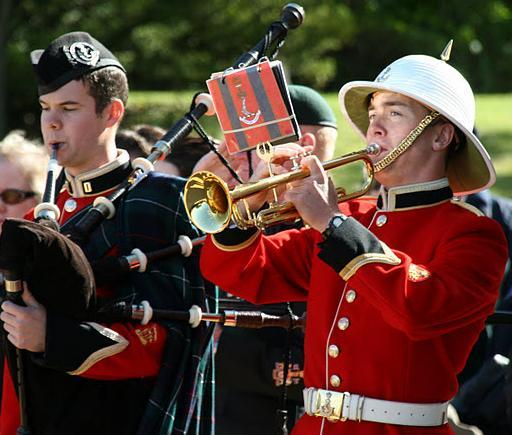
Officer cadets of the Royal Military College of Canada

An officer-in-training with the Canadian Armed Forces is known as an "officer cadet" or a "naval cadet". Officer/naval cadets in the Canadian Armed Forces are subordinate officers who are undergoing training to become commissioned officers. Officer cadets may be post-secondary students of the Royal Military College of Canada or the Royal Military College Saint-Jean under the Regular Officer Training Plan. Civilians and non-commissioned members of the Canadian Forces who are undergoing training and commissioning programs, like the "University Training Plan for Non-Commissioned Members" or the "Commissioning from the Ranks Plan", are also appointed as officer cadets.

=== Finland ===
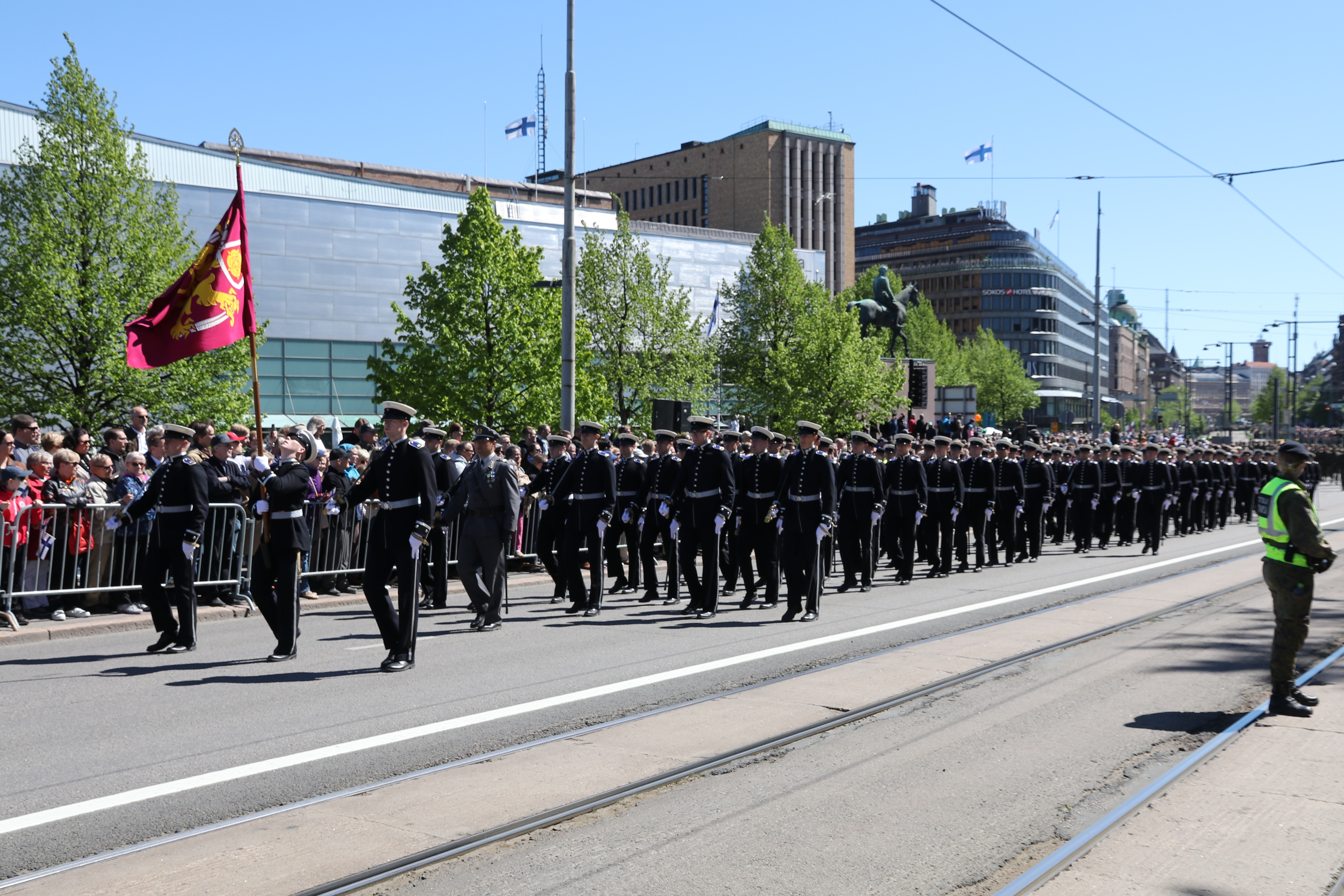
Finnish cadets participating in a national parade. Note the colour of the National Defence University carried in the van of the column and the parade uniform style peculiar to the cadets.

The National Defence University educates all officers of the Finnish Defence Forces and the Finnish Border Guard. All students attending the bachelor's degree programare military servicemen in the rank of cadet. The prerequisites for beng accepted in the program are:

- Finnish citizenship
- Passing the conscription with NCO or reserve officer training
- Psychological and physical suitability for officer profession
- Health in the sense of service suitability class "A".
- Reliability and honesty
- Not more than 26 years of age at the beginning of studies
- Possession of driver's licence of class B

The studies take three years. The first one and half years of studies take place in the National Defence University main campus on the island of Santahamina, Helsinki. The spring of the second year and most of third year take place in the service academies: Army, Naval and Air Force Academies, in the Border and Coast Guard Academy, or in the branch-specific schools of the Army Academy, according to the service and branch of each cadet.

The cadets are servicemen and under military discipline, forming a battalion-level unit called "Cadet School". For the purposes of internal organisation of the Cadet School, they may hold cadet NCO ranks, but with regard to the rest of the Finnish military, all cadets rank as second lieutenants, with the seniority of their promotion to second lieutenant. This is reasonable considering that all cadets are already reserve officers when they begin their studies. However, despite the status of students as officers, the internal discipline of the Cadet School is quite strict. Especially in the beginning of their first year, the cadets are under especially strenuous discipline administered both by the university faculty and senior cadets and marked by the obligatory participation in the traditional intiation rituals.

The cadets sign a service commitment that oblige them to accept a promotion to lieutenant and an appointment to a position in the Finnish Defence Forces or the Border Guard. The service commitment is three years. Those trained as military pilots commit for 13 and half years. An officer resigning the military or being dismissed will be required to reimburse the state for the cost of their education, unless they resign for medical reasons.

=== Germany ===
In Germany, the rank cadet (German: Seekadett) only exists in the German Navy for officers in training. In the Army and the Luftwaffe, officers in training usually have the rank of a Fahnenjunker or ensign (German: Fähnrich) before they are promoted into the rank of a lieutenant.

=== India ===
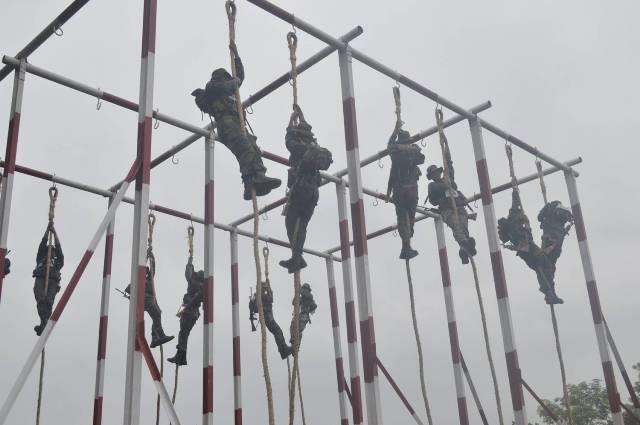
Gentleman cadets in India undergoing physical endurance training

Cadet is also used as a rank for those enrolled in military academies of India, such as the National Defence Academy, Indian Military Academy, Indian Naval Academy, Air Force Academy, Officers Training Academy, Indian Coast Guard Academy, or Armed Forces Medical College (India). These cadets are commissioned as officers in the respective service upon graduation and commit to serve. The term Gentleman Cadet is used to refer to Indian Military Academy trainees.

=== Indonesia ===
In the service academies of Indonesia which includes (Military, Naval, and Air Force) also with the Police Academy, cadets are called Taruna for military academy and police academy cadets, Kadet for naval academy cadets, and Karbol for air force academy cadets in Indonesian. For recruits or trainee who are training to be soldiers or police personnel in the enlisted ranks, the term is called Siswa which means "student". However, siswa may also refer to students who are studying in military high schools and other training institutions.

=== Ireland ===
In Ireland, a cadet is a pupil of the military college, which carries out officer training for the Air Corps, Army and Naval Service. Training takes two years and the cadets are split into senior and junior grades and classes.

=== Netherlands ===
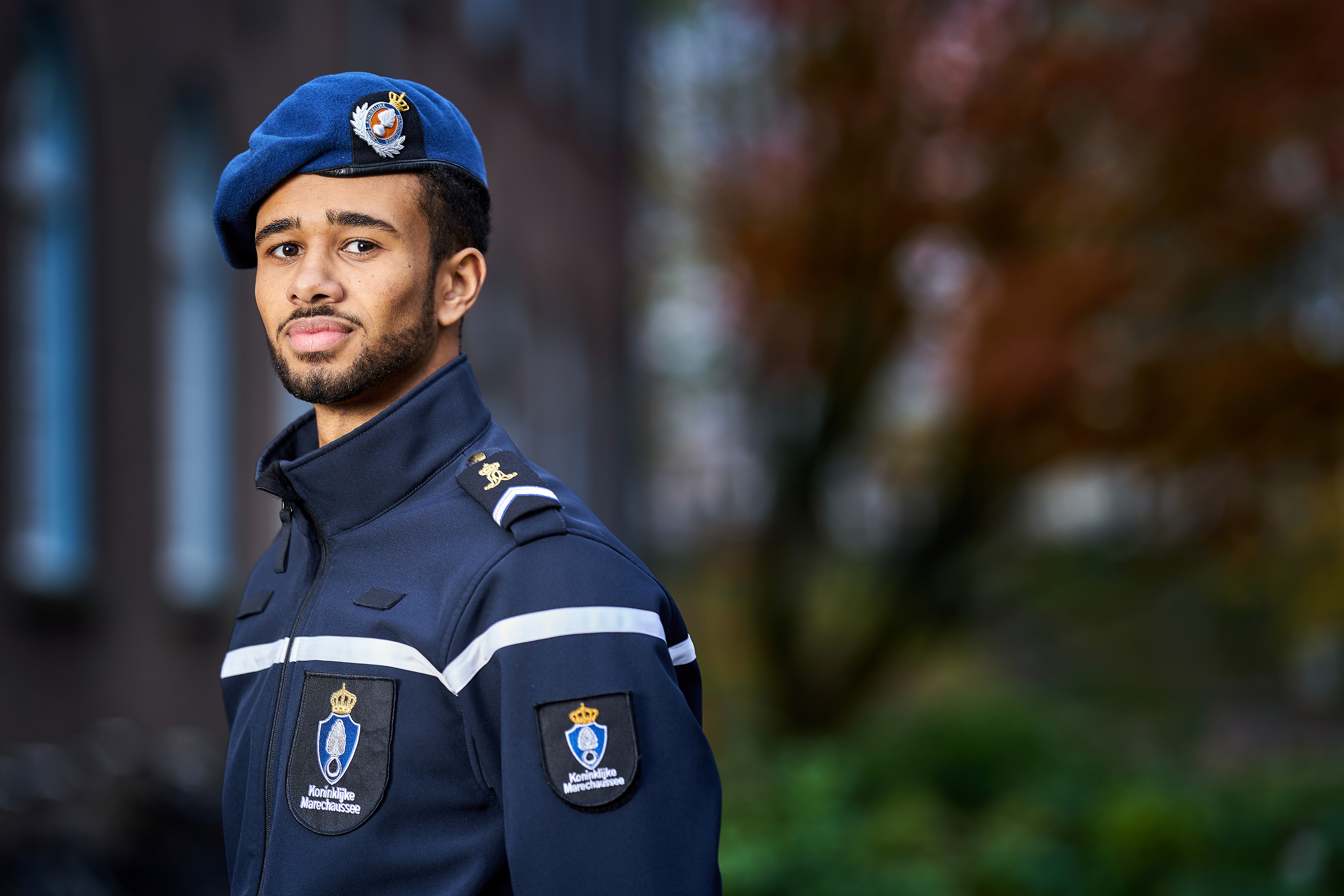
A cadet of the Koninklijke Militaire Academie in the Netherlands

The Koninklijke Militaire Academie is the service academy for the Dutch Army, the Dutch Air Force, and the Royal Marechaussee. Located in Breda, the Netherlands, the academy has trained future officers since 1828. All students serve as cadet or holding an upper cadet rank (i.e. cadet-sergeant). Students of the Dutch Royal Naval College, the service academy for the Royal Netherlands Navy, including the Netherlands Marine Corps do not serve as cadet, but as adelborst, the Dutch term for midshipman, or holding an upper adelborst rank (i.e. sergeant-adelborst). Both cadets and adelborsts are addressed as "jonker" (derived from "jonge heer" ("young lord") ).

=== Norway ===
In Norway, a cadet is an officer in training at one of the three Norwegian War Academies ("Krigsskole"). Each service branch (Army, Navy, and Air Force) is responsible for its war academy. The cadets hold the rank of 2nd Lieutenant during training, and graduate as a 1st Lieutenant.

=== Pakistan ===
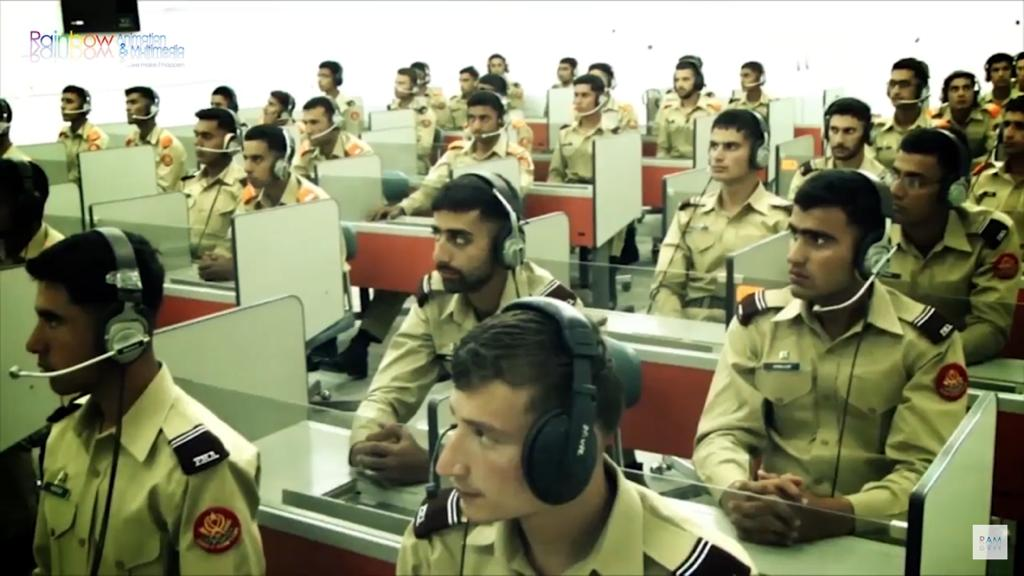
Gentlemen Cadets of the Pakistan Military Academy during a language lab

In Pakistan, a cadet is an officer in training at one of the three Military Academies of Pakistan, namely the Pakistan Military Academy, Pakistan Air Force Academy, and the Pakistan Naval Academy. Typically, male cadets are called 'Gentlemen Cadets' and female cadets are called 'Lady Cadets'. Cadets, based on their grades, physical fitness, and other achievements may be promoted to different ranks in the cadet system, the most senior rank is 'Academy Senior under Officer'. Cadets given these ranks are awarded certain privileges, for example, the ability to choose a unit of their preference upon passing out. Furthermore, it is one of these cadets who wins the coveted Sword of Honor. Some of these senior cadets are also selected for Foreign Academy training at the Royal Military Academy Sandhurst, Royal Military College, Duntroon and other allied military academies.

=== Philippines ===
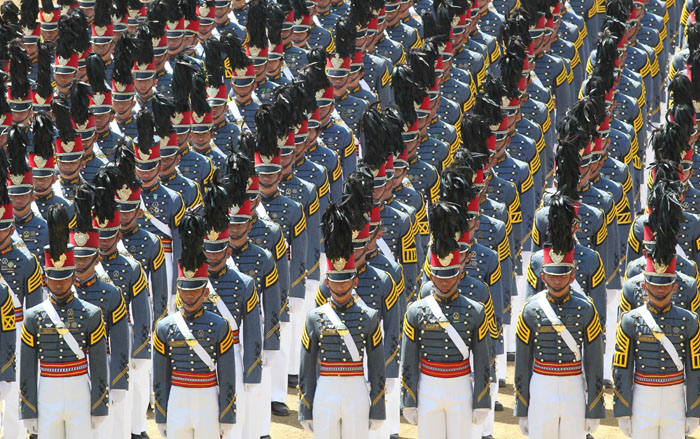
Cadets of the Philippine Military Academy during commencement exercises.

In the Philippines, the term cadet is used in mostly military attached organizations, but it is more distinctive in the service academies of the Philippines, [e.g., the Philippine Military Academy (PMA), the Philippine National Police Academy (PNPA), Philippine Merchant Marine Academy (PMMA), Maritime Academy of Asia and the Pacific (MAAP) and Aerospace Cadets of the Philippines (ACP). Graduates of these service academies are automatically given officer commissions in the Armed Forces of the Philippines, the Philippine National Police, Philippine Coast Guard, the Bureau of Fire Protection, and Bureau of Jail Management and Penology. Graduates of PMMA are given reserve officer status in the Philippine Navy and mostly go to private shipping firms. Service academy cadets are thought to be between the NCO and officer ranks, and NCO consider cadets as rank higher to them. Punishments for the cadets depends on their violations. If a cadet violates the rules and regulations of Philippine Military Training and the rules of the school itself, the cadet will get punished by either doing push-ups, pumping, or squat.

Officer candidates are referred to RESCOM, AFPOCS and PCGOBETC students who had baccalaureate degree, foreign service academies and reserve officer pools undergoing 4 months to 1 year of rigorous military training. On the other hand, cadets are referred to students of military schools undergoing 4 years of military training while completing their college degree.

=== Turkey ===
In Turkey, a cadet is a pupil of the military college, which carries out officer training for the Air Forces, Army, Naval Forces and coast guard and gendarmerie. Training takes two years and the cadets are split into senior and junior grades and classes. Military colleges and schools were gathered under one roof within the National Defense University in 2016.

=== United Kingdom ===
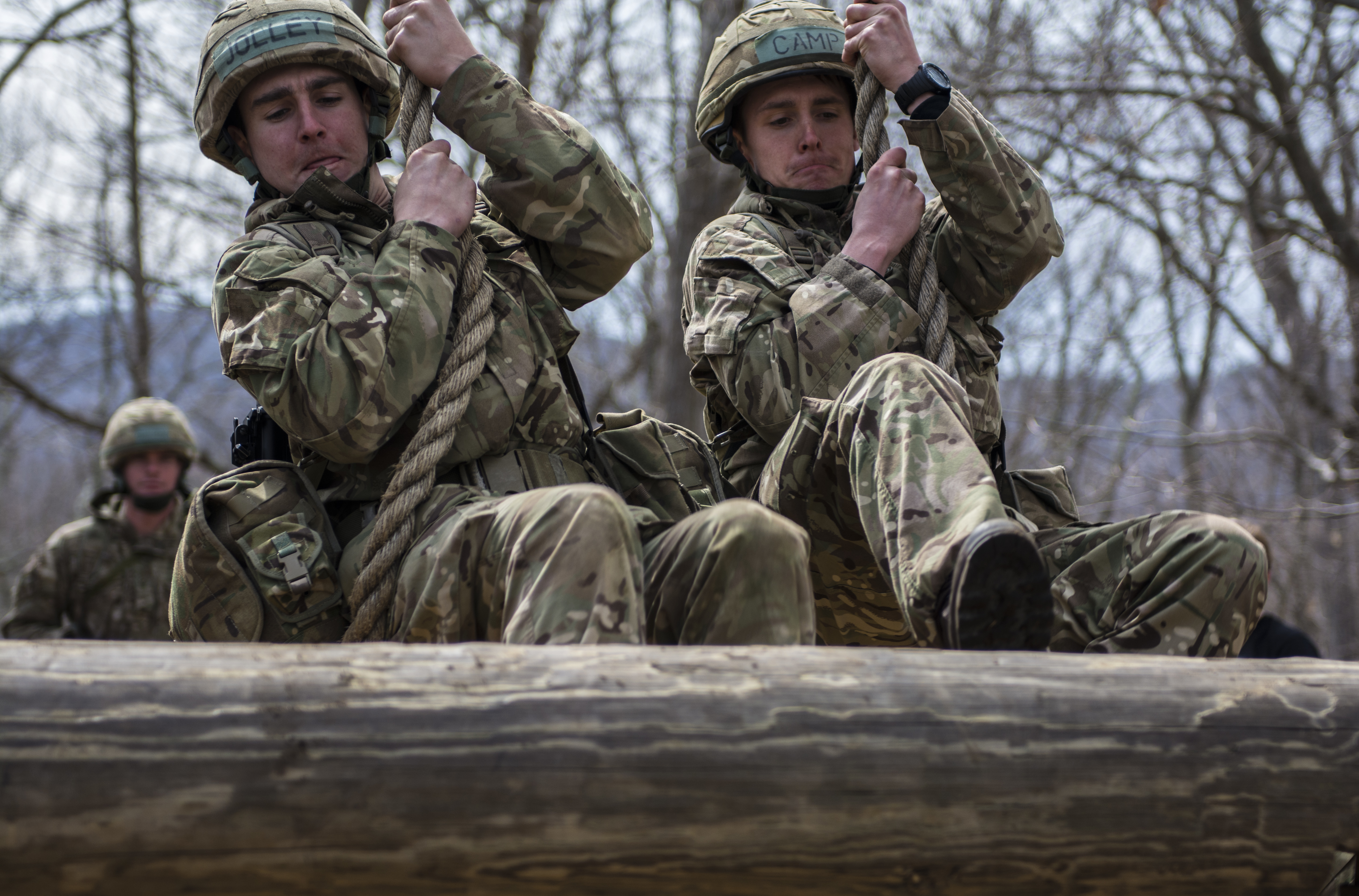
Officer cadets assigned to the Royal Military Academy Sandhurst practice manoeuvering a rope swing

Officers in training at one of the UK's officer training schools, these are Britannia Royal Naval College for the Royal Navy, Commando Training Centre Royal Marines for the Royal Marines, Royal Military Academy Sandhurst for the British Army and Royal Air Force College Cranwell for the Royal Air Force, as well as students who are part of the Defence Technical Undergraduate Scheme, have the rank of Officer Cadet.

=== United States ===
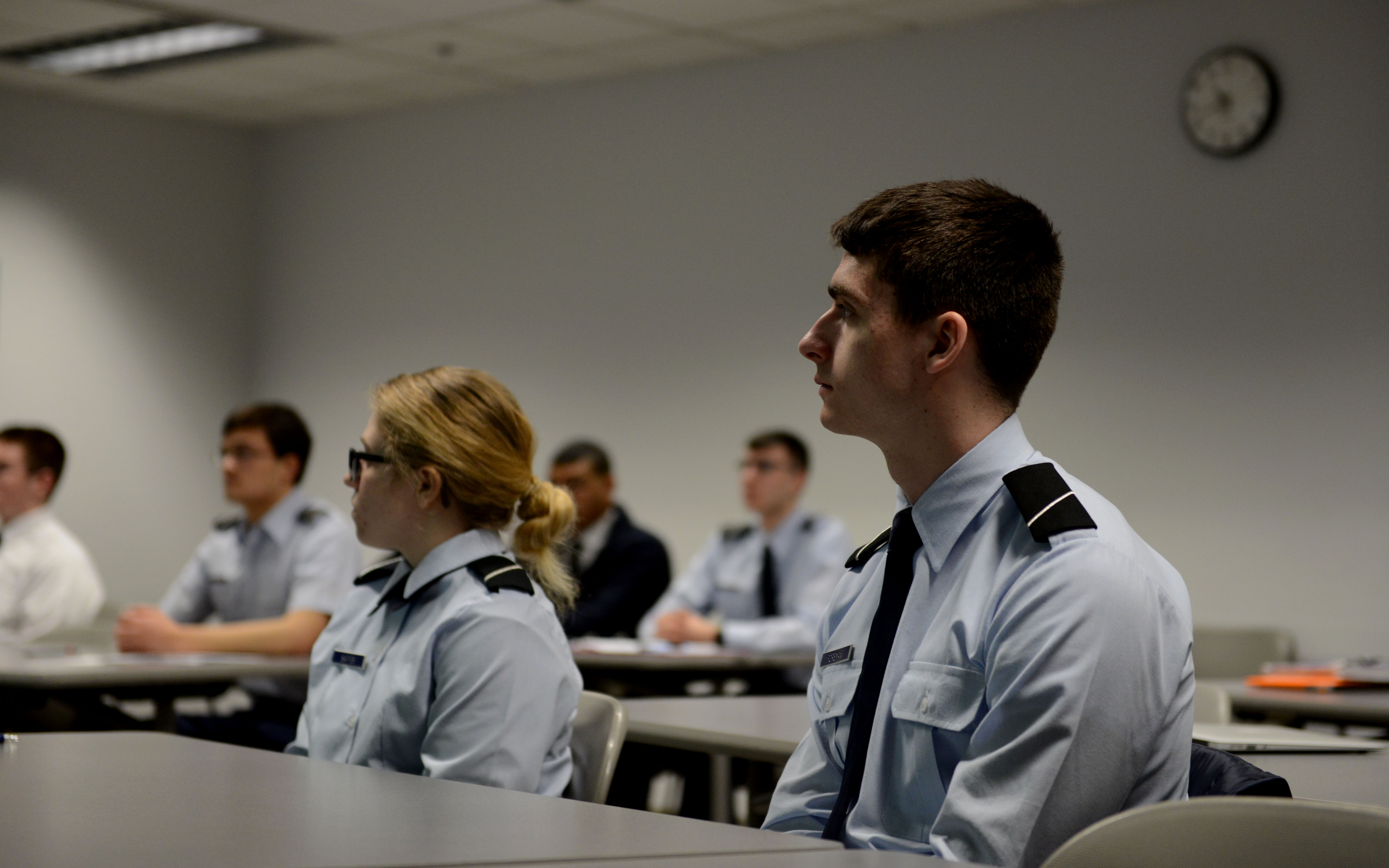
Cadets of the Air Force Reserve Officer Training Corps of the University of Alaska Anchorage

In the United States, cadet refers to a full-time college student who is concurrently in training to become a commissioned officer of the armed forces. Students at the United States Military Academy, the United States Air Force Academy, and the United States Coast Guard Academy respectively hold the rank of Cadet, United States Army; Cadet, United States Air Force; and Cadet, United States Coast Guard, while students in the Army Reserve Officer Training Corps (AROTC) and the Air Force Reserve Officer Training Corps (AFROTC) respectively hold the rank of Cadet, United States Army Reserve; and Cadet, United States Air Force Reserve. In contrast, students at the United States Naval Academy, United States Merchant Marine Academy, and those enrolled in the Naval Reserve Officer Training Corps (NROTC) at civilian colleges and universities are referred to as "midshipman" (plural: "midshipmen") vice cadet and hold Midshipman rank in the United States Navy and United States Naval Reserve, respectively.

== Civilian organisations ==
Several civilian organisations, most notably police services and civil aviation and maritime groups, use the term cadet to refer to their trainees/students.

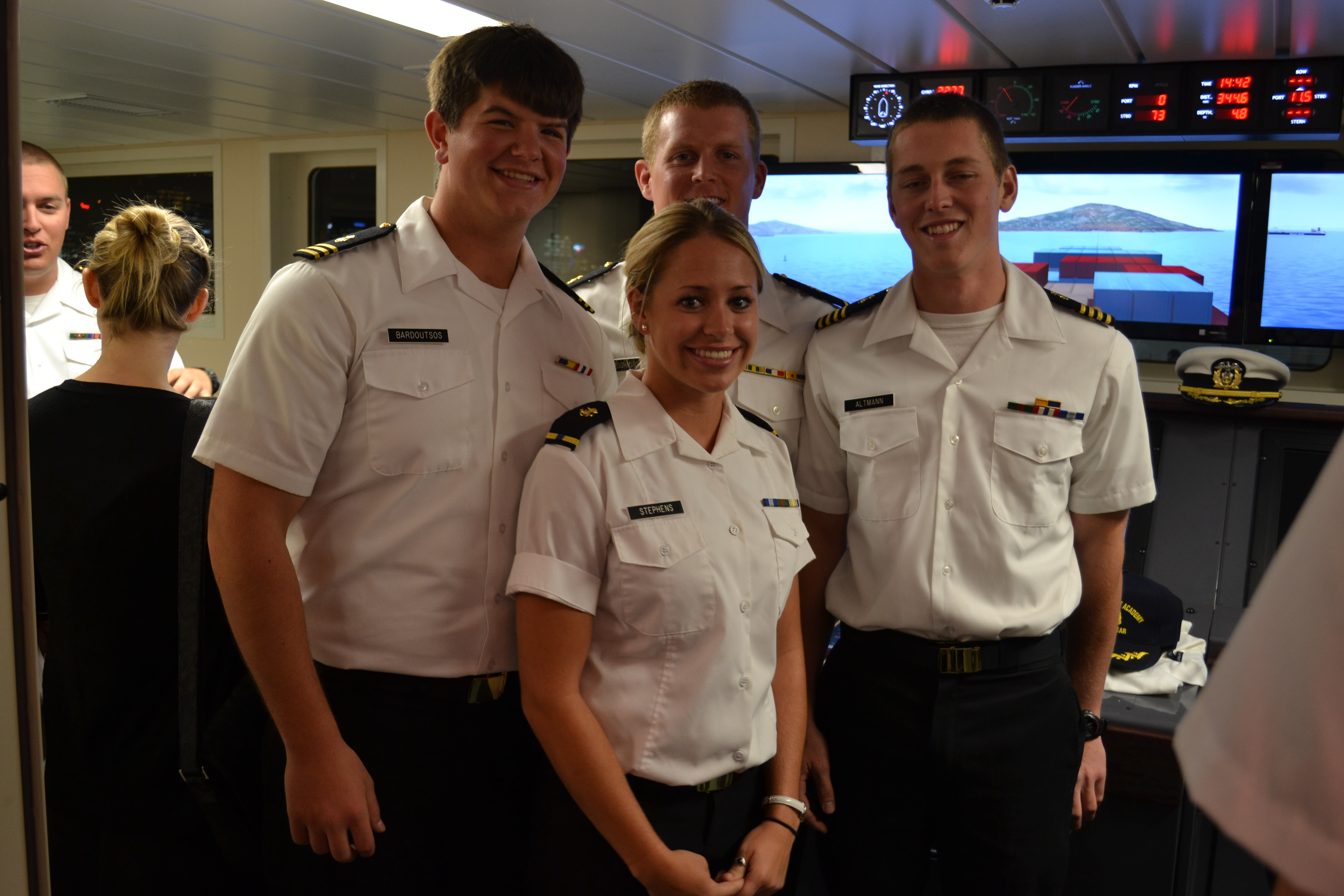
Cadets of the California Maritime Academy

Trainee mariners of maritime colleges such as the Bangladesh Marine Academy and Indian Maritime University are also called cadets. Students at the United States Merchant Marine Academy and the preponderance of students at the Maine Maritime Academy, the Massachusetts Maritime Academy, the California Maritime Academy and the State University of New York Maritime College, though called cadets at their respective institutions, actually hold the rank of Midshipman, United States Merchant Marine Reserve, United States Naval Reserve. Some state-sponsored military colleges, including The Citadel, Virginia Military Institute (VMI) and private military colleges like Norwich University, refer to their students as cadets, or have lists of corps of cadets.
