= National Defence Academy (India) =

Training Institute of the Indian Armed Forces

- राष्ट्रीय रक्षा अकादमी
- Crest of NDA
- Motto: सेवा परमो धर्मः
- Motto in English: Service Before Self.
- Type: Defence Service training institute
- Established: 7 December 1949; 76 years ago
- Parent institution: Ministry of Defence
- Academic affiliations: Jawaharlal Nehru University
- Principal: Dr. Vinaydeep
- Commandant: Vice Admiral Anil Jaggi, AVSM
- Location: Khadakwasla, Pune, Maharashtra, India; 18°25′20″N 73°45′55″E
- Campus: 7,015 acres (28.39 km^{2}); Suburban
- Deputy Commandant: Rear Admiral Birendra S Bains, VSM
- Principal-Director Training: Air Cmde P K Srivastava, AVSM
- Colors: Maroon
- Website: nda.nic.in

The National Defence Academy (NDA) is the joint defence academy of the Indian Armed Forces. Here, cadets of the Indian Army, the Indian Navy, and the Indian Air Force train together before they go on to their respective service academies for further pre-commission training. It is located in Khadakwasla, Pune, Maharashtra.

The alumni of NDA include 3 Param Vir Chakra recipients and 13 Ashoka Chakra recipients. NDA has also produced 32 service chiefs of staff to date. When Lieutenant General Manoj Mukund Naravane got promoted to the Chief of Staff of the Army (COAS) in 2019, chiefs of all staffs, i.e. the Army, the Navy, and the Air Force were all NDA alumni from the same 61st course. The 145th course graduated on 30 November 2023, consisting of 188 Army cadets, 38 Naval cadets, 37 Air Force cadets, and 20 cadets from friendly foreign countries. The Supreme Court of India passed an order in August 2021 that allowed female candidates to appear for the all upcoming NDA entrance examination.

== History ==
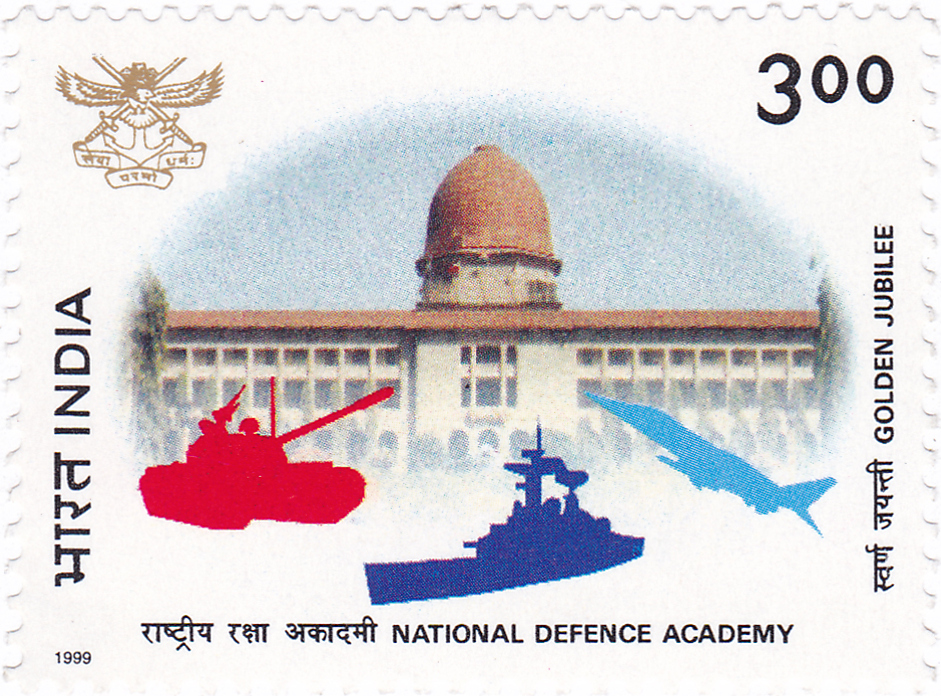
A 1999 stamp dedicated to the 50th anniversary of the National Defence Academy, featuring its Sudan Block

At the end of World War II, Field Marshal Claude Auchinleck, then Commander-in-Chief of the Indian Army, drawing on experiences of the army during the war, led a committee around the world and submitted a report to the Government of India in December 1946. The committee recommended the establishment of a Joint Services Military Academy, with training modeled on the United States Military Academy at West Point.

After the independence of India in August 1947, the Chiefs of Staff Committee immediately implemented the recommendations of the Auchinleck report. The committee initiated an action plan in late 1947 to commission a permanent defense academy and began the search for a suitable site. It also decided to set up an interim training academy, known as the Joint Services Wing (JSW), which was commissioned on 1 January 1949 at the Armed Forces Academy (now known as the Indian Military Academy) in Dehradun. Initially, after two years of training at the JSW, Army cadets went on to the Military wing of the Armed Forces Academy for two years of further pre-commission training, while the Navy and Air Force cadets were sent to Britannia Royal Naval College Dartmouth and Royal Air Force College Cranwell in the United Kingdom for further training.

In 1941, Lord Linlithgow, the then Viceroy of India, received a gift of £100,000 from a grateful Sudanese Government towards building a war memorial in recognition of the sacrifices of Indian troops in the liberation of Sudan in the East African campaign during World War II. Following partition, India's share amounted to £70,000 (Rs 14 Lakh at the time; the remaining £30,000 went to Pakistan). The Indian Army decided to use these funds to partly cover the cost of construction of the NDA. The foundation stone for the academy was laid by then Prime Minister of India, Jawaharlal Nehru on 6 October 1949. Construction started in October 1949. The revised estimated cost for the whole project was Rs 6.45 crores. The National Defence Academy was formally commissioned on 7 December 1954, with an inauguration ceremony held on 16 January 1955. The 10th JSW program was transferred from Clement Town, Dehradun, to NDA Khadakwasla. It is the first tri-service academy in the world.

== Campus ==
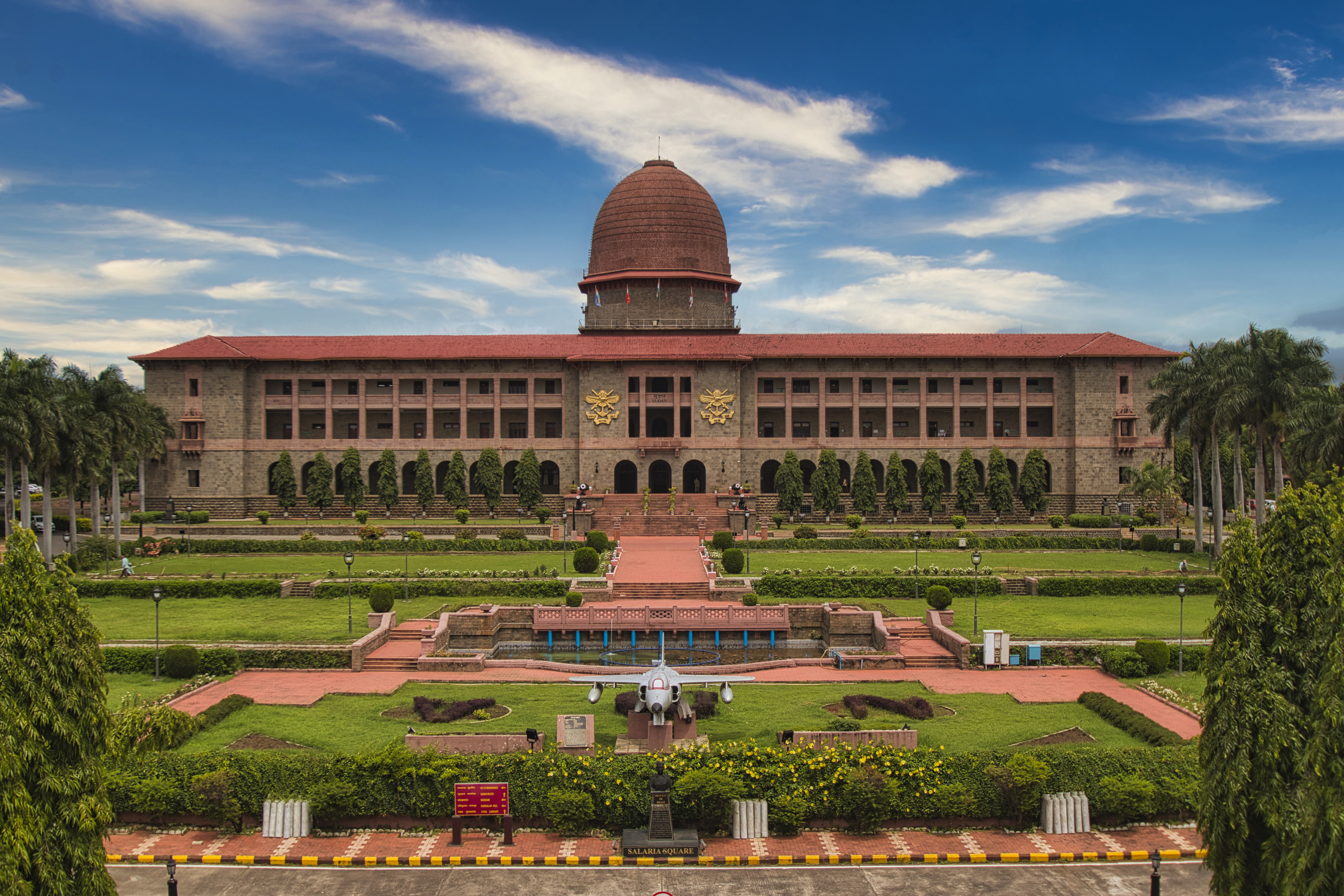
Sudan Block, National Defence Academy, Khadakwasla, Pune

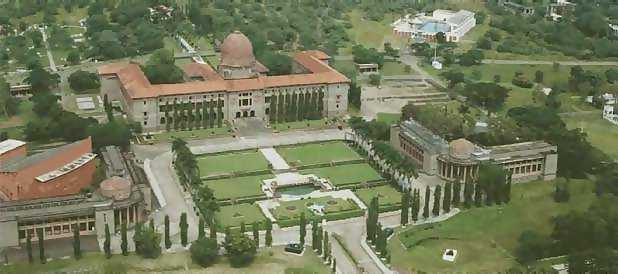
Aerial view of the Sudan Block of the academy

The NDA campus is located about 17 km southwest of Pune city, northwest of Khadakwasla Lake, with the Sinhagad Fort providing a panoramic backdrop. It spans 7,015 acres (28.39 km^{2}) of the 8,022 acres (32.46 km^{2}) donated by the Government of former Bombay State. While many states had offered land for a permanent place for the academy, Bombay got the honor of donating the most land, including a lake and neighboring hilly terrain. The site was also chosen for its proximity to the Arabian Sea and other military establishments, an operational air base nearby at Lohagaon, as well as the salubrious climate. The existence of an old combined-forces training center and a disused mock landing ship, HMS Angostura, on the north bank of the Khadakwasla Lake, which had been used to train troops for amphibious landings, lent additional leverage for the selection of the site.

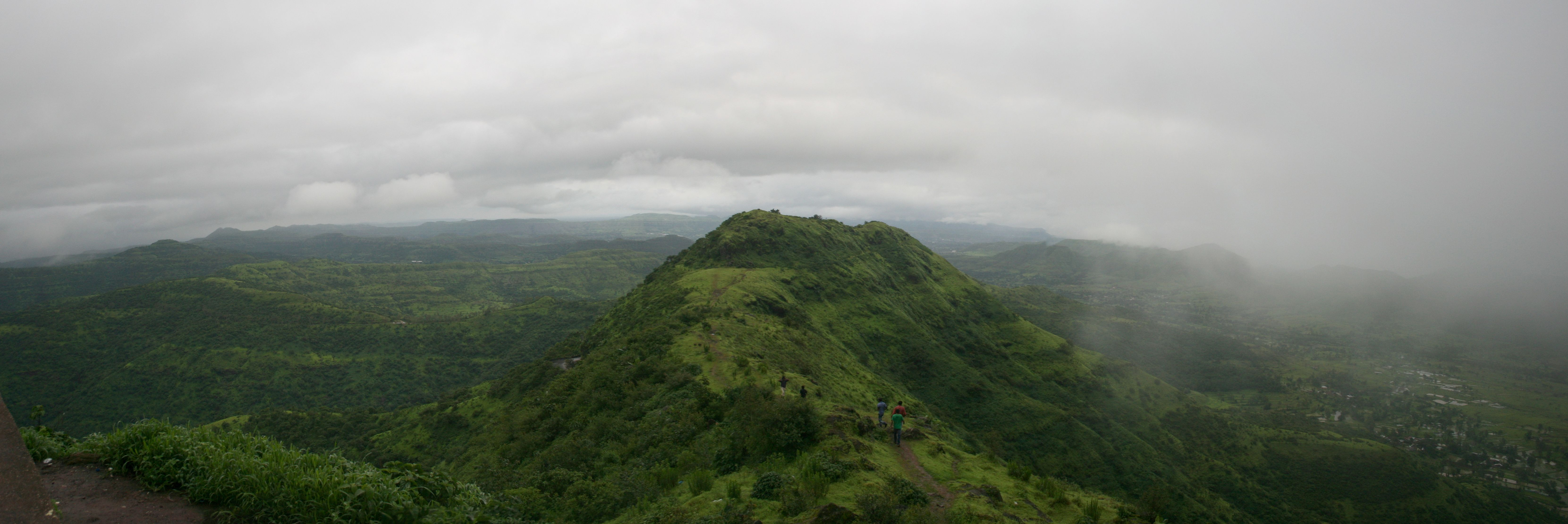
View from Sinhagad Fort, a backdrop for NDA

The administrative headquarters of the NDA was named the Sudan Block, in honor of the sacrifices of Indian soldiers in the Sudan theatre during the East African campaign. It was inaugurated by the then Ambassador of Sudan to India, Rahmatullah Abdulla, on 30 May 1959. The building is a three-story basalt and granite structure constructed with Jodhpur red sandstone. Its architecture features an exterior design comprising a blend of arches, pillars, and verandahs, topped by a dome. The foyer has white Italian marble flooring and paneling on the interior walls. NDA presents a variety of facilities, such as classrooms, labs, three Olympic-sized swimming pools, gymnasiums, 32 football fields, two polo grounds, a cricket stadium, and several squash and tennis courts. The academic year is divided into two terms, viz. Spring (January to May) and Autumn (July to December). A cadet must undergo training for a total of six terms before graduating from the NDA.

== Administration ==
=== Commandants ===
The Commandant of the National Defence Academy is the head and is in overall charge of the academy. The Commandant is a three-star rank officer from the three Services in rotation. Major General Thakur Mahadeo Singh, DSO was the first commandant of JSW at IMA. Major General Enaith Habibullah was the last head of the JSW and the First Commandant of NDA at Pune.

=== Selection procedure ===
NDA applicants are selected via a written exam conducted twice in a year by the UPSC, followed byi interviews hosted by the Services Selection Board (SSB) covering general aptitude, psychological testing, team skills, leadership qualities as well as physical and social skills, along with medical tests. Incoming classes are accepted twice a year for semesters starting in July and January. About 4,00,000 applicants sit for each written exam every year. Typically, about 6,300 of these are invited to interview, and finally, 300-350 are selected to attend the course. The minimum age should be 16 1/2 years and maximum age should be 19 1/2 years. The number of students who were admitted to the Joint Services Wing of the National Defence Academy during 1953-54 was 572. The total number of applications received in UPSC was 6,061.

Applicants who join the Air Force through the flying branch also go through a test called the Computerized Pilot Selection System, or CPSS for short. Cadets who are accepted and complete the program are sent to their respective training academies for at least one year of training before granting of commission: army cadets go to Indian Military Academy (IMA) at Dehradun, air force cadets to Air Force Academy (AFA) at Dundigal, Hyderabad, and naval cadets to Indian Naval Academy (INA) at Ezhimala, Kerala.

== Battalions and Squadrons ==
A cadet is allotted to one of the 18 Squadrons.

- No. 1 Battalion: Alpha Squadron, Bravo Squadron, Charlie Squadron, and Delta Squadron.
- No. 2 Battalion: Echo Squadron, Foxtrot Squadron, Golf Squadron, and Hunter Squadron.
- No. 3 Battalion: India Squadron, Juliet Squadron, Kilo Squadron, and Lima Squadron.
- No. 4 Battalion: Mike Squadron, November Squadron, Oscar Squadron, and Panther Squadron.
- No 5 Battalion: Quebec Squadron, Romeo Squadron

Each squadron has approximately 100 to 120 cadets drawn from junior and senior courses under training in the academy. As the number of cadets joining the NDA increased annually, the Defence Ministry of India sanctioned the raising of 16th, 17th, and 18th squadrons in 2012, with the initial letter of their names being "P", "Q" and "R" respectively.

The Inter Squadron Championship Trophy is awarded to the best squadron. The champion squadron has the celebratory tradition of possessing the Champion banner for one term, which is carried during the parade and other sports meets. Each squadron has its nickname, an individual identity with a squadron history, and a mascot. The rudimentary import of the NDA's motto "Service before Self" is first taught in the environs of the squadron, where a cadet learns the importance of putting the squadron's requirements well above his own.

== Academy honour code ==
Cadets in the NDA have to pledge to uphold the honour code of the academy.

== Academy prayer ==
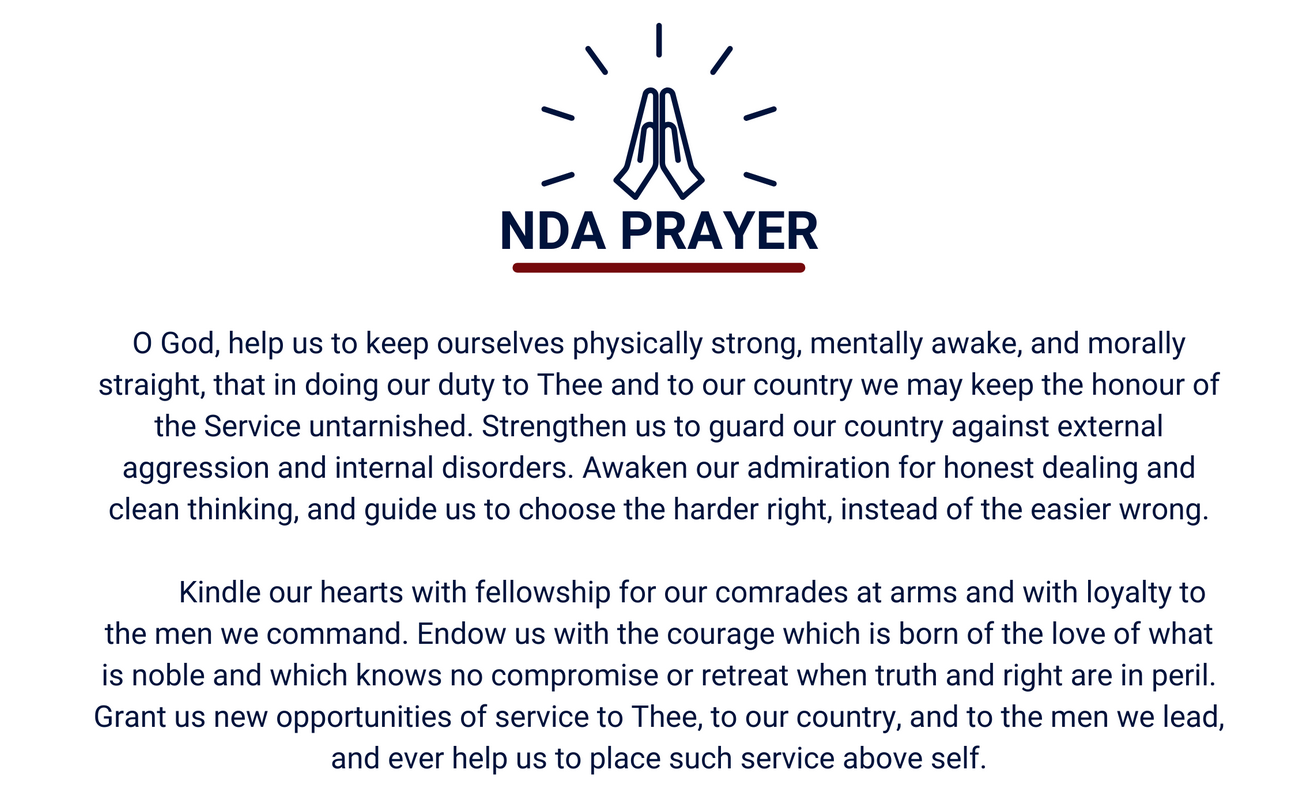
NDA Prayer

The NDA Prayer is a religion agnostic. Rather than praying to the God of any specific religion, the prayer has been modeled to seek blessings for performing duty to the country and remaining morally straight. The prayer also seeks blessings for granting opportunities of service to the country and the men the cadets would go on to lead, and overall to place 'service before self'.

== Curriculum ==
=== Academics ===
The NDA offers only a full-time, residential undergraduate program. Cadets are awarded a Bachelor of Arts or a Bachelor of Science for Army Cadets and a Bachelor of Technology degree for Naval and Air Force Cadets after 3 years of study. Naval cadets complete their fourth year of B.Tech. from Indian Naval Academy, while Air Force cadets complete their fourth year of B.Tech. from the Indian Air Force Academy. Further, the Cadets have a choice of two streams of study. The Science stream offers studies in physics, chemistry, mathematics and computer science. The Humanities (Liberal Arts) stream offers studies in history, economics, political science, geography and languages.

In both streams, academic studies are split into three categories.

- In the Compulsory Course, cadets study English, Foreign Languages (Arabic, Chinese, French or Russian), physics, chemistry, mathematics, computer science, history, political science, economics and geography. Note that all cadets must take basic classes in all these subjects except foreign languages. Cadets then take advanced classes depending on their chosen stream.
- The Foundation Course is mandatory and comprises Military Studies and General Studies. Subjects such as military history, military geography, weapons systems and armaments, etc., are covered in Military Studies. Subjects such as geopolitics, human rights, Laws of Armed Conflict, and environmental sciencess are covered in General Studies.
- The Optional Course focuses on subjects specific to the cadet's chosen Service.

Cadets spend the first four semesters on the Compulsory Course and the Foundation Course. They take the Optional Course during the fifth and sixth semesters. They may transfer to other Service academies for the optional courses.

=== Training ===
All the cadets joining the NDA after their 10+2 Examination are trained in the academy for three years culminating in graduation with Bachelor of arts or a Bachelor's of science or BCs (Computer Science) degree of Jawaharlal Nehru University & University of Delhi; the first course to be awarded degrees was the 46th course in 1974. Apart from academic training they are also trained in outdoor skills, like Drill, PT and games; apart from one of the foreign languages up to the lower B1 level (according to the international standards).

=== Joint service training ===
==== Army ====
Cadets are imparted with basic military skills of weapon handling, firing, field engineering, tactics, and map reading. The learning imparted acts as a foundation for the army cadets for their further training at IMA and various service courses. The method of training imparted is both theoretical and practical, which includes classes, lectures, demonstrations, and exercises for further application of acquired knowledge on the ground.

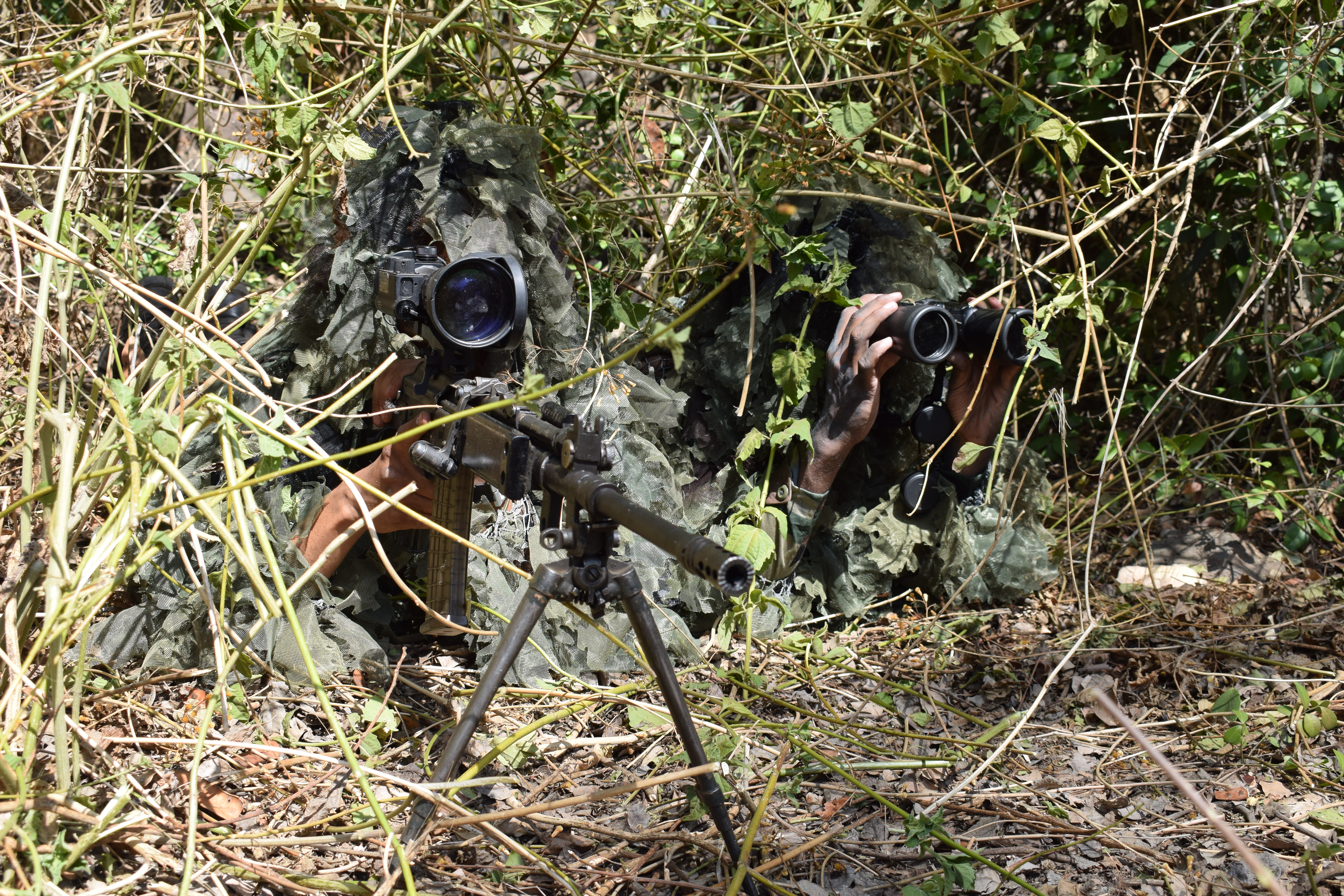

Camp Green Horn is conducted during the second term for cadets. Camp Rover is conducted during the fourth term for cadets. In the sixth term Camp Torna, "recalling the first victory of Shivaji, a teenager" is conducted, where practical aspects are reinforced in simulated field conditions. The cadets are provided with opportunities to demonstrate leadership qualities in various tactical situations.

==== Navy ====
The Naval Training Team (NTT) is the oldest of the Training Teams at the NDA. The main task of the Naval Training Team is to train V and VI term naval cadets on Specialist Service Subjects both theoretical and practical. Naval cadets on completion of their 3 years of training go to Indian Naval Academy (INA) as their finishing academy for 1 year, where they commence their M.Sc. degree along with cadets of INA who will be doing B.Tech. From 2015, army and air force cadets get naval training as well.

The major emphasis is laid on Navigation, Seamanship, and Communication. A total of 328 theoretical classes are conducted for VI-term naval cadets. Theoretical instructions are imparted in the classroom at NTT and Peacock Bay by using modern teaching methodology, wherein 3D models, Computer Assisted Instruction (CAI), and Computer Based Training (CBT) packages, scaled-down models are used. Practical instructions are imparted in the Watermanship Training Centre at Peacock Bay during regular periods and club days. TS Ronnie Pereira, the in-house scale model of a warship, helps in imparting training.

To orient the cadets to the Navy, an orientation visit to Mumbai is conducted before the commencement of service training, during which the cadets visit various classes of ships, submarines, shop floors, repair facilities, etc. As part of the visit, the naval cadets are sent to the NBCD School to acquaint themselves with firefighting and damage control aspects. Further, to inculcate competitive spirit and adventurism amongst the cadets, VI-term naval cadets are sent to the Naval Academy, Ezhimala, to take part in the Open Sea Whaler Sailing Expedition and interact with their counterparts at the INA. Camp Varuna during the middle of the term to get a first-hand experience on board during sailing, and Camp Varuna II at the end of the term to put the theoretical knowledge acquired at NTT into practical use during the three days' sailing. Watermanship Training Centre includes Yachting, Kayaking, Windsurfing, Rowing, Water-skiing, and Ship Modeling.

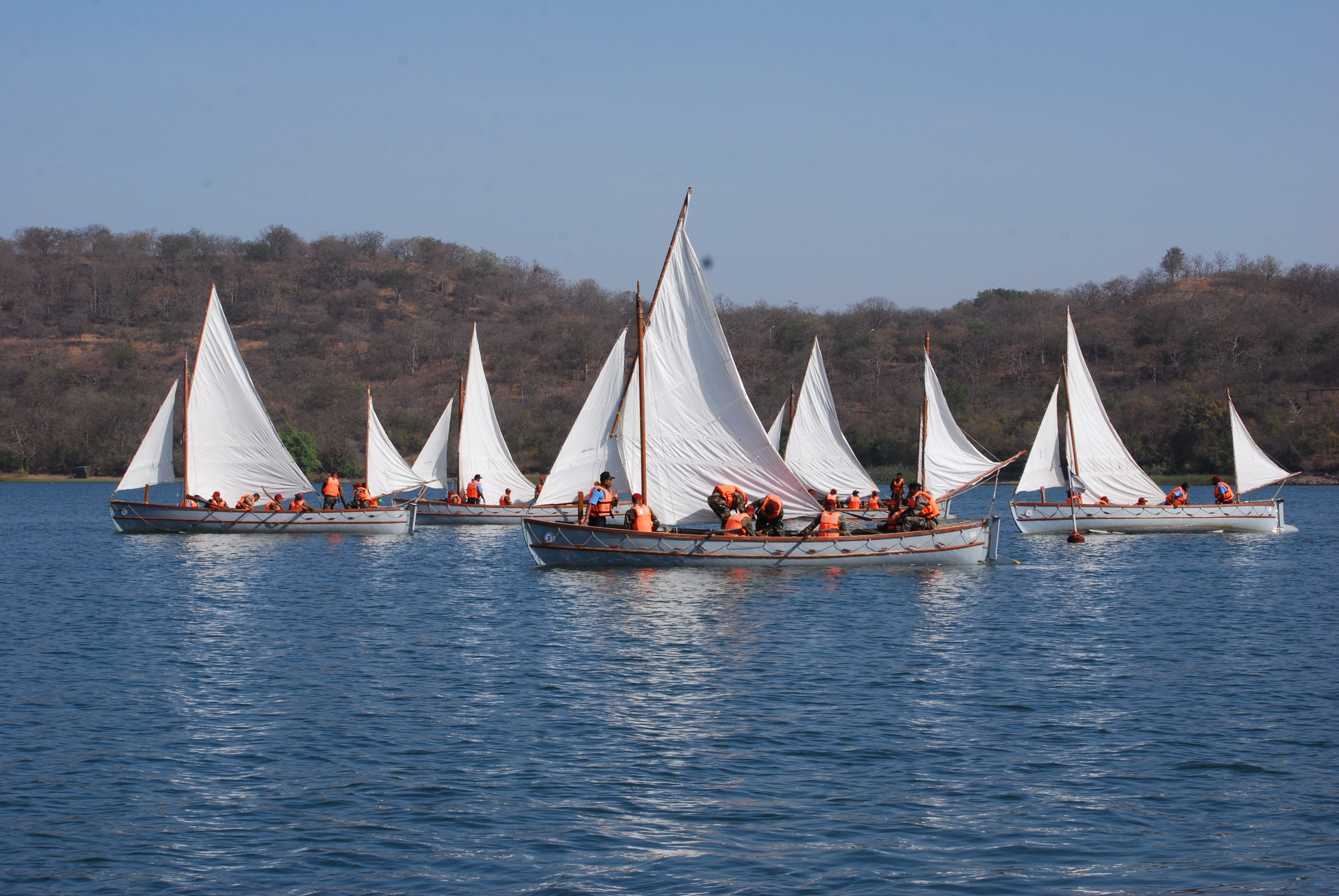

==== Air Force ====
The Air Force Training Team (AFTT) aims at training Air Force cadets in the basics of military aviation through ground training and flying training. Ground training is conducted with the help of modern training aids, aircraft models, and cross-sectional models of aero-engines and instruments, Radio Telephony simulators, Flight simulators, and other methods. Flying training consists of a minimum of eight sorties on the Super Dimona aircraft. Cadets also get exposure to deflection firing through Skeet shooting. Visits to key Air Force training establishments, Air Force Stations, and civil aviation centers are also undertaken to give cadets first-hand experience of aviation activities. Visits to Air Force Academy, Air Wing at Indian Armament Technology, Air Base at Pune, and College of Military Engineering are organized to enable the Air Force cadets to appreciate the Air Force aspects. Flying training at the AFTT is fully backed by an Automatic Weather Station, an Air Traffic Control Station, a paved runway, and dispersal for six aircraft.

The AFTT was formed towards the end of 1956. The AFTT aims to introduce the VI Term cadets to gliding and allied professional subjects, which in turn prepares them for their professional training in the Air Force flying establishments. Over the last 60 years, gliding training has evolved into flying training. Five different classes of gliders were acquired by the academy in 1957. They are Sedberg T-21B, Baby Eon, Eon Olympica, Rohini and Ardhra gliders. All these gliders, except the Baby Eon and Eon Olympics, were utilized in the flying training of the cadets. The Sedberg T-21B was the mainstay of the AFTT in glider flying, with each cadet being permitted a total of 60 training launches, after which 2-3 mandatory Solo Check launches were flown with the Chief Flying Instructor (CFI). Cadets cleared for solo flying flew one solo trip on the glider and were then formally awarded their 'Wings', exactly half the size of the official Indian Air Force wings, which were worn above the left shirt pocket of their formal uniforms. Sandbags were used as ballast in place of the absent instructor.

The cadet who went solo with the lowest number of launches was usually awarded the Best In Gliding Trophy on the Guest Dining-in Night, one night before the Passing Out Parade. The Air Force cadet who stood first in Ground Subjects was awarded the Sqn Ldr Vasudev Memorial Book Prize that same night. The induction of Super Dimona in 2001 was a watershed moment in the history of AFTT, introducing a huge jump in the quality of training. A "gliderdrome" runway was widened to 100’ and extended to 5000’ from earlier dimensions of 50’X 3000’, which is maintained within the premises of the NDA by the AFTT. The Air Force cadets of the academy now learn the basics of flying training at this facility on the Diamond Super Dimona HK36 aircraft.

== Passing out ==
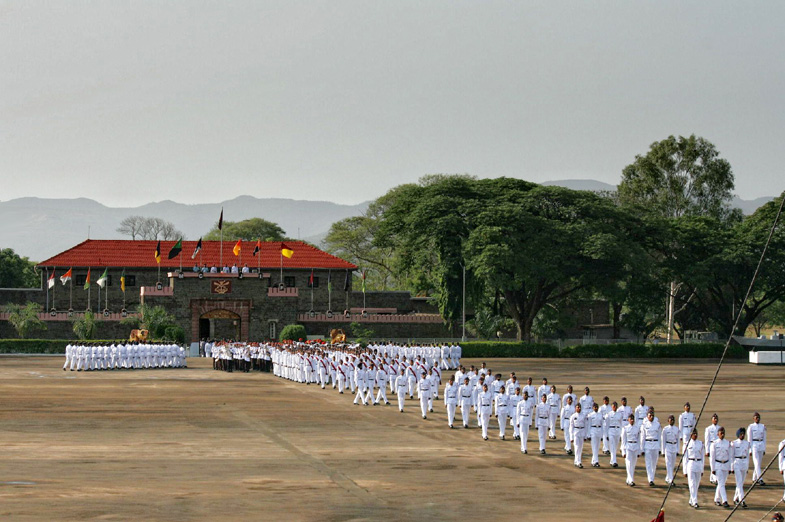
Passing Out Parade at the National Defence Academy on 30 November 2022.

On 30th May 2025, 336 cadets passed out of the academy during the passing-out parade of the 148th course of the academy. Among the 336 cadets, 17 were female cadets; it was the first time for female cadets graduating from the National Defence Academy. Former COAS and Governor of Mizoram General VK Singh was the chief guest for the occasion.

== Alumni ==
The first NDA cadet to be commissioned into the Indian Air Force was Chaman Lal Gupta, who was part of the inaugural 1 JSW Course. Initially earmarked for the 57th Pilot Course in Jodhpur, he was rerouted to the 56th Course at Begumpet, making him the first NDA alumnus to wear Air Force blue. His passing out was marked by the gift of a double ostrich egg to his Commandant — a nod to his origins at NDA

Alumni of the academy have led and fought in every major conflict in which India has participated since the academy was established. Their combat honors include 3 Param Vir Chakras, 31 Maha Vir Chakras, 160 Vir Chakra, 13 Ashok Chakras, 40 Kirti Chakras and 135 Shaurya Chakras. 11 Chiefs of Army Staff, 10 Chiefs of Naval Staff and 4 Chiefs of Air Staff of the Indian Armed Forces have been NDA alumni.

Over the years, specific NDA squadrons have developed reputations for producing a significant number of senior Indian Air Force officers and gallantry awardees. According to one historical analysis, Hunter Squadron has produced more IAF Chiefs than any other, while other squadrons like Alpha and Foxtrot have also yielded high numbers of decorated air warriors.

== Param Vir Chakra ==
- Capt Gurbachan Singh Salaria
- 2/Lt Arun Khetarpal
- Capt Manoj Kumar Pandey

== Ashok Chakra ==
- 2/Lt Pollur Mutthuswamy Raman
- Grp Capt Rakesh Sharma
- 2/Lt Rakesh Singh Malhan
- Col Neelakantan Jayachandran Nair KC
- Maj Rajiv Kumar Joon SC
- Capt Arun Singh Jasrotia SM
- 2/Lt Puneet Nath Datt
- Maj Sudhir Kumar Walia SM**
- Capt Harshan R Nair
- Maj Dinesh Raghu Raman
- Maj Sandeep Unnikrishnan
- Maj Mohit Sharma SM
- Grp Capt Shubhanshu Shukla

== Media ==
The Standard Bearers, a documentary directed and written by Dipti Bhalla and Kunal Verma, provides an inside look into the history and operations of the NDA. Another documentary film My Flag, My Life written by Ambarnath Sinha and directed by Nandan Khuhyadi and Sanjay Dabke, provides details about the life of NDA cadets and is intended to create awareness about a career in the armed forces among the young generation. Books depicting NDA include the fictional "Boots Belts Berets" by Tanushree Podder, which is also being adapted into a web series. Outlook reported that over 1200 cadets quit NDA in ten years between January 2008 and November 2017.

== See also ==
- Air Force Academy
- Armed Forces Medical College
- Indian Military Academy
- Indian Coast Guard Academy
- Indian National Defence University
- Indian Naval Academy
- Military academies in India
- Sainik School
