= Military Institute of Technology =

Indian military training organization

Military Institute of Technology, Pune
- Former names: Institute of Armament Studies (1952–1967); Institute of Armament Technology (1967–2006); Defence Institute of Advance Technology (DU) (2006–2012)
- Motto in English: Victory Through Technology
- Type: Armed forces engineering training institute
- Established: 1952; 74 years ago, as the Institute of Armament Studies in College of Military Engineering (CME)
- Affiliations: Earlier with SPPU Pune, and now with IIT Bombay
- Commandant: Rear Admiral V Ganapathy
- Location: Pune, Maharashtra, India; 18°25′27″N 73°45′32″E
- Website: www.ids.nic.in/milit.php

The Military Institute of Technology (MILIT), Pune is a tri-services training institution of the Ministry of Defence of the Republic of India. Located at Pune, it trains selected officers of the three services of Indian Armed Forces and officers from friendly foreign countries for command and staff appointments. It conducts the Defence Services Technical Staff Course (DSTSC) for officers Indian Army, Indian Navy and Indian Airforce. The institute has a faculty of senior officers from all three services and scientists who provide specialized training on technologies, military warfare, procurement procedures and operational logistics to the student officers.

The course trains officers to handle senior commands and staff appointments in the future. On successful completion of the course, officers are awarded a degree of M.Sc in Military Technology from Pune University. Officers in the service bracket of 9 to 14 years attend this course. Most officers attending this course are of the rank of lieutenant colonel or major and equivalent.

== History ==
The forerunner of MILIT was the Institute of Armament Studies, established within the campus of College of Military Engineering (CME), Dapodi, Pune in 1952. The Institute then only conducted the Technical Staff Officers' Course for the Army. In the ensuing years, several courses were added to the institute's curriculum based on the needs of the three Services, Defence Research and Development Organisation, DGQA, DAQA and Defence PSUs etc.

In 1967, the institute was renamed Institute of Armament Technology (IAT), and moved into the picturesque location of Girinagar, on the Southern Bank of Khadakwasla Lake; its present location. The institute is spread over 496 acres (201 ha) in scenic beautiful location, overlooking the lake waters, in Sahyadri hills. From the relatively narrow scope of Armament Studies alone in the fifties, the role of the institute was considerably enlarged by the Defence R&D Council in 1964 and further in 1981.

On the basis of accreditation by the All India Council of Technical Education (AICTE), Pune University recognised eight courses for the award of ME degree in 1982. The institute acquired the status of a Deemed University in 1999. It became autonomous from 1 April 2006 and was rechristened Defence Institute of Advanced Technology (DIAT), a Deemed to be University (DU).

To have an institute completely dedicated to the needs of the three Services, a case was initiated to bifurcate MILIT from DIAT (DU), and the same was achieved on 19 Jan 2012. The major milestones leading to final formation of MILIT are given subsequently.

== Vision ==
- To be a centre of Excellence for training and education of the Indian Armed Forces in areas of military technologies and related fields.

== Mission ==
- To provide understanding of principles and application of military technologies, management and operational planning to selected officers of mid-career seniority to enable them to effectively tenate command and staff appointments.
- To understand foundational training of categories of officers in select disciplines of science, engineering and technology relevant to military systems.

== Objectives ==
- To impart high quality training.
- To develop multi-dimensional capabilities of officers.
- To promote jointmanship.
- To provide research support to Services on application of modern military technologies and synergy between military doctrines and technologies.

== Milestones ==
Period	Milestones
IAS and IAT
1952	Institute of Armament Studies at CME, Dapodi, Pune Campus
1953–54	First Technical Staff Course was conducted at Institute of Armament Studies
1964	Re-designated as Institute of Armament Technology
1967	IAT shifted to Girinagar, Pune
1975–76	TSC – 22 was redesignated Technical Staff Officer's Course – 01
1982	Six courses recognized for award of ME Degrees by University of Pune
1989	Two new M.Tech courses added
1996	Institute of Armament Technology registered as a society
1998	Eight PG courses accredited by AICTE/UGC
1999	Deemed University status given by AICTE/UGC
2004	Renamed as Defence Institute of Advanced Technology, DIAT (DU) admitted first batch of PG students in June
2006	Granted autonomous status by Govt of India on 01 Apr and rechristened as DIAT (DU)
MILIT
17 Aug 2010	In principle approval by RM for formation of MILIT (designated as MILIT Foundation Day) at Girinagar, Pune
Nov 2010	Dr Salwan Committee constituted and recommendations made on the bifurcation of MILIT from DIAT (DU)
19 Jan 2012	MILIT established as 52nd Lab of DRDO with PE of DRDO and Implementation Committee constituted under chairmanship of Lt Gen Anoop Malhotra, CC R&D(RM)
06 Feb 2012	MILIT formally inaugurated in a military ceremony by Lt Gen AK Singh, PVSM, AVSM, SM, VSM, ADC, GOC-in-C, Southern Command
Mar 2012	Actionable instructions issued by Implementation Committee and transfer of assets commenced
13 May 2012	Technical Staff Officers Course (TSOC)-37 and Naval Technical Staff Course (NTSC) were among the first long courses passed out after formation of MILIT. Chief of Air Staff (CAS) Air Chief Marshal Arup Raha was the chief guest on the occasion. Rear Admiral AS Sethi, Commandant MILIT and other senior officers from the three services were present on the occasion.
01 Apr 2015	Constitution of MILIT as an AFTI under the aegis of HQ IDS
18 May 2018	Formation sign of MILIT was inaugurated by Lieutenant General Satish Dua, PVSM, UYSM, SM, VSM, Chief of Integrated Defence Staff to the Chairman Chiefs of Staff Committee (CISC). "The formation sign has three elements. At the base is a nib highlighting the significance of knowledge and the fact that 'Pen can sometimes be mightier than the sword', the interlocked three rings in service colours representing the synergy of the three Services, a gear representing technology reiterating our motto of "Victory through Technology" and flames that symbolise the zeal and zest (or even the fire in our belly) to work towards victory in all endeavours. The maroon background further accentuates jointness." The formation sign was designed by Mrs Radhika Rajeev Jadhav w/o Maj JB Desai (TSOC-43).
01 Jul 2018	TSOC-44 course was redesignated as Defence Services Technical Staff Course (DSTSC)-01
02 Jul 2018	Air Vice Marshal Vivek Rajhans, VSM took over as Commandant, MILIT, Pune
01 Feb 2021	Maj Gen Hari Singh, VSM took over as Commandant, MILIT, Pune
01 Jan 2022	Air Vice Marshal V Rajasekhar took over as Commandant, MILIT
01 Jan 2022	Air Vice Marshal Vivek Blouria, took over as Commandant, MILIT, Pune
21 Jun 2024	Rear Admiral Nelson D'Souza, took over as Commandant, MILIT, Pune

== Campus ==
The institute is located on Pune-Sinhagad-Panshet road on the Southern Bank of Khadakwasla Lake at Girinagar. There is an all-weather road between NDA and MILIT.

The campus is spread over 496 acres, divided into Technical Complex and Residential Complex.

- The Technical Complex is spread over 100 acres and houses the Academic Block, Administrative Headquarters, 51 Laboratories, library, etc. of DIAT (DU) and MILIT, Pune.
- Residential Complex is spread over 396 acres and has accommodation for 200 staff and student officers with the ancillaries like Officers' Mess, Officers' Institute, JCOs' Mess, MI Room, Sports Complex, CSD Canteen, Helipad, a market with a bank, Post Office, Gas Agency etc. Kendriya Vidyalaya and MILIT Tiny Tots Primary School are also located in the campus.

== Courses ==
In order to meet the specific and futuristic training requirements of Armed Forces, DIAT (DU) was bifurcated to form Military Institute of Training (MILIT), Pune. MILIT is mandated to conduct 23 courses of varying durations from three days to 48 weeks for the Officers of the three services.

- First Technical Staff Course was conducted in 1953–54, later the name of the course was changed to Technical Staff Officer's Course (TSOC)
- TSOC-01 was conducted in Yr 1975–76.
- On 1 July 2018, TSOC-44 course was redesignated Defence Services Technical Staff Course (DSTSC-01). The DSTSC-01 is the pioneer course of all Arms and Interservices mid-seniority bracket of Officers whose non-tech and tech phase commenced from 4 June 2018 and 2 July 2018 respectively.

== Events ==
To commemorate its 10th Raising Day, MILIT conducted a seminar on 'Space Security: National Security Challenges and Strategic Implications' on January 19, 2022. The proceedings were held online due to the pandemic restrictions, and witnessed around 400 online participants. The speakers and delegates included Air Marshal B R Krishna, Chief of Integrated Defence to the Chairman, Chiefs of Staff Committee, Dr V R Lalithambika, Distinguished Scientist and director, Directorate of Human Space Programme ISRO, Lt Gen Anil K Bhatt (retd), Director General, Indian Space Association, Air Vice Marshal D V Khot, Director General, Defence Space Agency, Major General Dhruv C Katoch (retd), Additional Director at Centre for Land Warfare Studies and Group Captain Ajey Lele (retd), Senior Fellow, Manohar Parrikar Institute for Defence Studies and Analysis.

A delegation of six Sri Lankan Armed Forces officers were on a three-day visit to India as part of the 9th Army to Army Staff talks. As a part of their visit, they visited MILIT on February 11, 2022 to interact with the Commandant and faculty of the institute. The delegation discussed various training methodologies and technical studies undertaken, and they concluded the visit by meeting the Sri Lankan students in the institute.

On March 1, 2022, Air Marshal Shashiker Choudhary, PVSM, AVSM, VSM, ADC, Air Officer Commanding-in-Chief, Maintenance Command visited MILIT to deliver a talk on 'Fleet Sustenance: Challenges and Opportunities in the Indian Air Force'. They discussed the need for engagement with academia, local industries and start-ups to promote development of home-grown solutions. The importance of self-reliance and 'Atmanirbharta' was highlighted, citing the ongoing geopolitical crisis as a major reasoning.

== List of commandants ==
S.no	Name	Branch	Assumed office	Left office
Director and dean, Institute of Armament Studies
1	Mr. P. Johnson OBE		September 1952	September 1955
2	Mr. C. H. Smith OBE		February 1957	October 1960
3	Air Commodore O. P. Mehra	Indian Air Force	October 1960	July 1963
4	Commodore M. K. Lele	Indian Navy	November 1963	January 1964
Director and dean, Institute of Armament Technology
4	Commodore M. K. Lele	Indian Navy	January 1964	December 1967
5	Brigadier P. P. Singh AVSM	Indian Army	February 1968	September 1972
6	Dr. J. N. Nanda		January 1973	January 1977
7	Air Commodore S. K. Nair AVSM	Indian Air Force	May 1977	August 1979
8	Rear Admiral S. S. Venkateshwaram	Indian Navy	October 1979	August 1979
9	Major General N. Subbarao	Indian Army	March 1983	April 1986
10	Dr. E. Bhagirathi Rao		August 1986	April 1990
11	Air Vice Marshal U. A. Deshpande	Indian Air Force	April 1990	June 1992
12	Rear Admiral Ajay Sharma AVSM	Indian Navy	June 1992	June 1992
13	Major General A. P. Palta	Indian Army	July 1994	July 1996
14	Prof. U. C. Durgapal		July 1996	November 1996
15	Prof. G. S. Mani		December 1996	December 2001
16	Rear Admiral A. K. Handa VSM	Indian Navy	March 2002	May 2004
16	Mr. Y. B. Pathak		May 2004	January 2005
17	Mr. P. Ramachandra Rao		January 2005	March 2006
Commandant, Military Institute of Technology
18	Major General V. K. Passi VSM	Indian Army	April 2006	October 2006
19	Air Vice Marshal Rajiv Sharma VSM	Indian Air Force	October 2006	March 2008
20	Rear Admiral Rakesh Bajaj VSM	Indian Navy	July 2008	December 2009
21	Major General Ravi Saxena	Indian Army	December 2009	April 2012
22	Air Vice Marshal P. P. Khandekar	Indian Air Force	April 2012	May 2014
23	Rear Admiral A. S. Sethi VSM	Indian Navy	May 2014	June 2016
24	Major General Mukesh K Dutta	Indian Army	June 2016	Dec 2017
25	Major General A. K. Sapra VSM	Indian Army	01 January 2018	01 July 2018
26	Air Vice Marshal V. Rajhans VSM	Indian Air Force	02 July 2018	31 January 2021
27	Major General Hari Singh VSM	Indian Army	01 February 2021	31 December 2021
26	Air Vice Marshal V. Rajasekhar	Indian Air Force	01 January 2022	30 June 2023
27	Air Vice Marshal Vivek Blouria	Indian Air Force	01 July 2023	20 June 2024
28	Rear Admiral Nelson D'Souza NM	Indian Navy	21 June 2024	30 June 2025
29	Rear Admiral V. Ganapathy	Indian Navy	1 July 2025	Present

== See also ==
- Indian National Defence University
- Military academies in India
- Sainik school
