= Military academies in India =

Academies and staff colleges across India

The Indian Defence services have established numerous academies and staff colleges across India for the purpose of training professional soldiers in military sciences, warfare, command and strategy, and associated technologies.

== Education and training ==
- Rashtriya Indian Military College: The Rashtriya Indian Military College (RIMC), Dehradun was founded on 13 March 1922 with the object of providing necessary preliminary recruit training for Indians wishing to become officers in Indian Armed Forces. The institution now runs school classes from 8th to 12th on the 10th and 12th based CBSE pattern and serves as a feeder institution to the National Defence Academy, Khadakwasla (Pune), where male students who have passed 12th grade at school are taken as cadets to receive their initial training for the Army, Navy, and Air Force.
- Military Schools:
  - Chail Military School Chail (oldest one) (Previously known as King George Royal Indian Military College) Shimla.
  - Ajmer Military School Ajmer (Founded 1930) (Previously known as King George Royal Indian Military College) Ajmer
  - Bangalore Military School (Erstwhile King George Military School, Bangalore and now Rashtriya Military School, Bangalore)
  - Belgaum Military School
  - Dholpur Military School
- Sainik School: The Sainik Schools are a system of schools in India established and managed by the Sainik Schools Society under Ministry of Defence. They were conceived in 1961 by V. K. Krishna Menon, the then Defence Minister of India, to rectify the regional and class imbalance amongst the Officer cadre of the Indian Military, and to prepare students mentally and physically for entry into the National Defence Academy (NDA), Khadakwasla, Pune and Indian Naval Academy (INA), Ezhimala, Kannur, Kerala. Presently, 33 schools are operational and proposed for the future, covering the entire nation.

== Integrated national institute ==
Indian National Defence University at Gurugram in Haryana is likely to commence courses from 2018-19 as an autonomous integrated national institute. At least 66% students will be from the Indian Armed Forces and the remaining 33% will be from the Paramilitary forces of India, Indian Police Service officials and civilians.

Functioning on the similar principals as Indian Institutes of Management (IIMs) and Indian Institutes of Technology (IITs), the university will offer post-graduate studies, doctoral and post-doctoral research as well as higher studies through distance learning to military officials and civilians to be imparted by the mixed teaching faculty composed of military officials and civilians in the ratio of 1:1. Courses will include war gaming and simulation, neighborhood studies, counterinsurgency and counterterrorism, Chinese studies, evaluation of strategic thought, international security issues, maritime security studies, Eurasian studies, Southeast Asian studies, material acquisition, joint logistics, and national security strategy in maintaining both peace and war.

The following existing institutes will be affiliated with the university:

- National Defence College (NDC) New Delhi
- College of Defence Management (CDM) Secunderabad
- Defence Services Staff College (DSSC), Wellington
- Military Institute of Technology (MILIT), Pune
- National Defence Academy (NDA) Khadakwasla

== Indian Army ==
The chief institutions training Indian Army officers are:

- Indian Military Academy
- Army War College: It is the premier All Arms Tactical Training Institution for officers and performs functions of evaluation of concepts and doctrines in the fields of tactics and operational logistics. The institution was earlier known as College of Combat, Mhow and has been re-designated as Army War College, Mhow from 1 January 2003.
- Infantry School: The Infantry School, Mhow is the largest and the oldest military training centre of the Indian Army. The institution is responsible for developing the complete spectrum of tactical drills and concepts about infantry operating in varied terrain and environments, and introducing them from time to time. This institution also trains the National Shooting Team under the aegis of the Army Marksmanship Unit (AMU), which is part of the Infantry School.
- Junior Leaders Wing: The Junior Leaders Wing, Belgaum is part of the Infantry School, Mhow and trains junior officers and junior leaders at the sub-unit level in tactical and special mission techniques to enable them to carry out assigned operational missions.
- Officers Training Academy, Chennai: Officers Training Academy transforms young graduates into commissioned officers armed with requisite military knowledge, leadership skills and morals & ethics of highest order. It is that prestigious gateway to the Army which equips the young minds to fight & win for our country with panache, second to none.
- Officers Training Academy, Gaya:- OTA Gaya, raised in July 2011, is the third pre-commission training (PCT) academy of the Indian Army with a planned training capacity of 750 cadets. It imparts pre-commission military training to regular army officers from Technical and SCO entries. The Officers Training Academy (OTA) in Gaya is being shut down as it is not used to its full potential, and the Sikh Light Infantry Regimental Centre, which is strapped for space at Fatehgarh in Uttar Pradesh, will shift there.
- High Altitude Warfare School: The High Altitude Warfare School (HAWS), Gulmarg is a training establishment imparting specialised Mountain Warfare and Winter Warfare Training to Indian Army personnel.
- Armoured Corps Centre and School: The Armoured Corps Centre and School (ACCS), Ahmednagar is a premier institution of the Army. It imparts training in the employment of mechanical forces in battle and the development of concepts for future battle.
- School of Artillery: School of Artillery, Deolali, Nasik district, Maharashtra, is a premier institution of the Army and imparts effective training, evaluation of new equipment for induction, and development of new concepts/doctrine for application of artillery fire.
- Army Air Defence College: The Army Air Defence College (AADC), Gopalpur imparts training for provision of effective Air Defence Artillery protection to ground forces against long and medium altitude enemy air attacks and also to preserve specified tactical and strategic vital areas and pivotal points from critical danger and destruction from enemy air attacks.
- College of Military Engineering: The role of College of Military Engineering (CME), Pune encompasses three aspects, i.e., training, advisory, projects, research, and experimentation.
- Military College of Telecommunication Engineering: The Military College of Telecommunication Engineering (MCTE), Mhow is a premiere training institute of the Corps of Signals. A variety of courses catering to the training needs in Information Technology and Communication for the Indian Army are conducted at MCTE.
- Counter-Insurgency and Jungle Warfare School (India) (CIJW School): The CIJW School in Vairengte, Mizoram, is an institution for counter-guerilla training. The institution has risen to be the nodal agency for imparting counter-insurgency training for the other branches.
- Junior Leader's Academy (JLA), Bareilly and Ramgarh: The Junior Leader's Academy (JLA), Bareilly and Ramgarh, conducts institutionalised leadership training for Junior Leaders, who are Junior Commissioned Officers and Non-Commissioned Officers of the Army.
- Army Service Corps (ASC) Centre and College: The ASC Centre and College, Bangalore imparts training to Officers, personnel below officer rank of Army Service Corps and other arms and services indicating personnel from foreign countries in various disciplines of Suppliers, Fuel, Oil and Lubricants, Mechanical Transport, Animal Transport and Air dispatch. The Centre also trains recruits for induction into service into Army Service Corps.
- Army Medical Corps (AMC) Centre and School: The AMC Centre and School, Lucknow conducts from basic to advanced courses for Army Medical Corps and Military Nursing Service Officers. The Centre also trains recruits for induction into service into Army Medical Corps.
- Military College of Materials Management, Jabalpur (MCMM), Jabalpur: The College of Materials Management (CMM), Jabalpur, is a premier training institute of the Army Ordnance Corps. It runs logistics courses like basic ordnance management, advanced material management, higher munition course, and quarter master courses for officers, JCOs, and NCOs. It also imparts training to technical clerks of AOC and storekeeper technical of the Indian Army.
- Military College of Electronics and Mechanical Engineering: The Military College of Electronics and Mechanical Engineering (MCEME), Secunderabad (Hyderabad, Telangana) is an institution of technical education in the Army. The College was awarded the Golden Peacock National Training Award (1997) as well as the Golden Peacock National Quality Award.
- Remount and Veterinary Corps (RVC) Centre and School: The RVC Centre and School, Meerut Cantt, imparts basic military and technical training to young veterinary graduates on commission and to various technical tradesmen of the corps like Dressers, Riders, Ferriers, Army Dog trainers, and lab attendants. The Centre also trains recruits for induction into service into the Remount and Veterinary Corps Centre and School.
- Army Education Corps (AEC) Training College and Centre: The AEC Training College and Centre, Pachmarhi is a Category 'A' establishment, a Regimental Training Centre for AEC personnel and an Autonomous College affiliated to Barkatullah University, Bhopal.
- Corps of Military Police (CMP) Centre and School: The CMP Centre and School, Bangalore imparts basic military training to all personnel enrolled in Corps of Military Police and also conducts courses for officers on deputation to the corps.
- Army School of Physical Training: The Army School of Physical Training (ASPT), Pune runs the Sports Training Course for Army personnel, central police organisations, and paramilitary forces to train instructors capable of imparting physical training and sports coaching at an appropriate level.
- Army Airborne Training School: The Army Airborne Training School (AATS), Agra imparts training in aerial delivery and air transportation of men and material. It is also responsible for carrying out Research and trials about air portability and para-dropping of all types of equipment.
- Institute of National Integration: The Institute of National Integration (INI), Pune imparts training to Officers, Personnel Below Officer Rank, and Religious Teachers. Its focus is on instilling a sense of national and cultural unity in the officer corps.
- Institute of Military Law: The Institute of Military Law (IML), Kamptee is a Tri-Services Institute which imparts training to officers of the Judge Advocate General Branch of the Army, Navy, Air Force, and Coast Guard, as well as officers and other ranks of other arms and services in military and allied laws. The Institute is the only Institute in Asia that imparts both practical and theoretical training in military law and its procedures.
- Army Sports Institute: The Army Sports Institute (ASI) at Pune and Army Sports Nodes is a public-relations sports centre, intended for portraying the Army in a positive light. Appropriate funds have been earmarked for the construction and equipment, coupled with food, habitat, advertising, and training under foreign coaches.
- Army Cadet College: Army Cadet College (ACC), Dehradun is a Wing of the IMA which caters for the training of service cadets selected for commission. On completion of the course, these cadets also qualify for a B.A. or B.Sc. degree, recognised by the Jawaharlal Nehru University.
- Combat Army Aviation Training School (CAATS): CAATS is the main training course for aviators of the air wing of the Army, the Army Aviation Corps. It is located at the Army Aviation Base in Nashik Road. It replaced the Indian Air Force's academy, the Helicopter Training School (HTS), as the main training school for army aviators. It mainly operates Cheetahs and Chetaks and also has Simulators.

Others include:

- Army Clerks Training School, Aurangabad
- Army School of Mechanical Transport, Bangalore
- Army/ Air Transport Support School, Agra
- EME School, Vadodara
- Military School of Music - Pachmarhi

== Indian Navy ==
The Indian Navy has numerous training establishments at various places. The Indian Naval Academy is presently located at Ezhimala, near Kannur in Kerala.

Name of Institute	Location	Role
Indian Naval Academy	Ezhimala	Officers Training
Naval War College	Goa	Officer Leadership Training
INS Chilka	Khordha	Sailors Training
INS Venduruthy	Kochi	Seamanship School
INS Satavahana	Visakhapatnam	Submarine School
INS Dronacharya	Kochi	Naval Weapons Training
INS Hamla	Mumbai	Combined Operations Training
INS Garuda	Kochi	Aviation
INS Rajali	Arakkonam	Helicopter Training School
INS Agrani	Coimbatore	Leadership Training
INS Mandovi	Panaji	Provost and Physical Training School
INS Shivaji	Lonavala	Technical Training
INS Valsura	Jamnagar	Electric Equipment Training
INS Vishwakarma	Visakhapatnam	Shipwright School
Institute of Naval Medicine	Mumbai	
Naval Institute of Educational and Training Technology (NIETT)	Kochi	
National Institute of Hydrography	Goa	

== Indian Air Force ==
The Indian Air Force has a Training Command and several training establishments. While technical and other support staff are trained at the various Ground Training Schools, the pilots are trained at the Air Force Academy located at Dundigal, near Hyderabad, Telangana.

For Officers

Name of Institute	Location
College of Air Warfare	Secunderabad (near Hyderabad)
Tactics and Air Combat Development Establishment (TACDE)	Gwalior
Flying Instructors School	Tambaram
Pilot Training Establishment	Allahabad
Air Force Administrative College	Coimbatore
Institute of Aero-Space Medicine	Bangalore
Air Force Technical Training College	Jalahalli (near Bangalore,)
Paratrooper's Training School	Agra
Indian Air Force Test Pilot School	Bangalore
TETTRA Schools	Pune, Chandigarh, Dundigal
Air Defence College	Memaura (near Lucknow)

For Airmen Cadets

Name of Institute	Location
Basic Training Institute	Belgaum
Mechanical Transport Training Institute (MTTI)	Avadi
Workshop Training Institute (WTI)	Tambaram
Mechanical Training Institute (MTI)	Tambaram
Electronic Training Institute (ETI)	Jalahalli (near Bangalore)
Electric & Instrumentation Training Institute (EITI)	Jalahalli (near Bangalore)
Communication Training Institute (CTI)	Jalahalli (near Bangalore)
Air Force Police & Security Training Institute (AFP&STI)	Avadi
Non-Technical Training Institute (NTTI)	Belgaum
Air Force School of Physical Fitness (AFSPF)	Belgaum
Medical Training Centre (MTC)	Agram Post, Bangalore
Garud Regimental Training Centre (GRTC)	Chandinagar

== Indian Coast Guard ==
As of now, Indian Coast Guard Navik (sailors) Cadets are trained at INS Chilka and other naval establishments. Officer cadets are currently trained at the Indian Naval Academy. In the coming years, the new Indian Coast Guard Academy is coming up at Mangalore.

- Indian Coast Guard Academy - Mangalore (Upcoming)
- Coast Guard Pilot Training Squadron - Daman and Helicopter Training School INS Rajali, jointly trained with Indian Navy helicopter pilot cadre - Arakkonam

== Tri-service Institutions ==
- National Defence College: The National Defence College (NDC), inaugurated on 27 April 1960, is the only institution in the country that imparts knowledge on all aspects of national security and strategy. Senior Defence and Civil Service Officers participate in a 47-week comprehensive programme of national security and strategy.
- College of Defence Management: The Institute of Defence Management (IDM), Secunderabad, (Hyderabad) was established in June 1970 to impart modern, scientific management training to the Armed Forces Officers. The IDM was renamed as the College of Defence Management (CDM) in 1980. The College has trained over 5,000 officers of the rank of Major to Major General and equivalents of the three Services through its on-campus programmes. It has also given exposure in defence management to a large number of officers through external capsules. Officers from Paramilitary Forces, Ministry of Defence, Research and Development Organisations, and friendly foreign countries also attend various on-campus programmes.
- Defence Services Staff College: The Defence Services Staff College (DSSC), Wellington is a premier tri-service training establishment imparting training to middle-level officers (Majors and equivalent) of the three wings of Indian Armed Forces, friendly foreign countries and Indian Civil Services. The DSSC is located in picturesque settings at Wellington, near Conoor in the Nilgiris mountains of Tamil Nadu State.
- Military Institute of Technology (MILIT), Pune: MILIT is an inter-services technical training institution of the Ministry of Defence. It conducts Defence Services Technical Staff Course (DSTSC), Tank Technology Course (TTC), and trains officers of the three Services of Indian Armed Forces and officers from friendly foreign countries for command and staff appointments.
- National Defence Academy: The National Defence Academy (NDA), Khadakwasla is a premier Inter-Service training institution where future officers of the Armed Forces are trained. The training involves an exacting schedule of three years before the cadets join their respective Service Academies, viz., the Indian Military Academy, the Naval Academy, and the Air Force Academy.
- Military Intelligence Training School and Depot (MITSD), Pune: Set up in 1942, the institution continues to train intelligence professionals of the three services as well as from the paramilitary forces, civil agencies and friendly foreign countries.

== Medical Personnel ==
- Armed Forces Medical College (AFMC)

The AFMC is located in Pune, Maharashtra. It is an inter-services institution. AFMC has multiple roles to perform. They are primarily training medical undergraduates and post-graduates, dental postgraduates, nursing cadets, and paramedical staff. Patient care forms an integral part of its training curriculum, and the attached hospital benefits from the expertise available at AFMC. The institution is responsible for providing the entire pool of specialists and super-specialists to the Armed Forces by giving them in-service training.

The AFMC is well known as one of the premier medical institutions of India, and its entrance is through the National Eligibility cum Entrance Test for which millions of students appear. The students compete for its 150 seats (30 for female cadets and 115 for male cadets), out of which 5 are reserved for cadets from friendly foreign countries. Selected candidates are also required to pass a medical and fitness test, which is at par with the one for Officer Cadets. On the completion of the five-year course, the medical cadets are granted short service commission for seven years or permanent commission in the Indian Army, Navy, or Air Force, which includes a one year internship, after which the officers are detailed for Medical Officers' Basic Course (MOBC) at the Officers' Training School at AMC Centre and School at Lucknow for basic military training as well as training in battle-field medicine.

- College of Nursing, Army Hospital (R&R)

Nursing students from College of Nursing, Army Hospital (R&R) are commissioned into the Military Nursing Service (MNS) as lieutenants. After being posted into the MNS, the lieutenants would go on to be posted across the nation in various Armed Forces Hospitals.

== See also ==
- Indian National Defence University
- Sainik school
