= Indian Naval Academy =

Defence service in Kerala, India

Indian Naval Academy (INA)
- भारतीय नौसेना अकादमी (भा.नौ.अ)
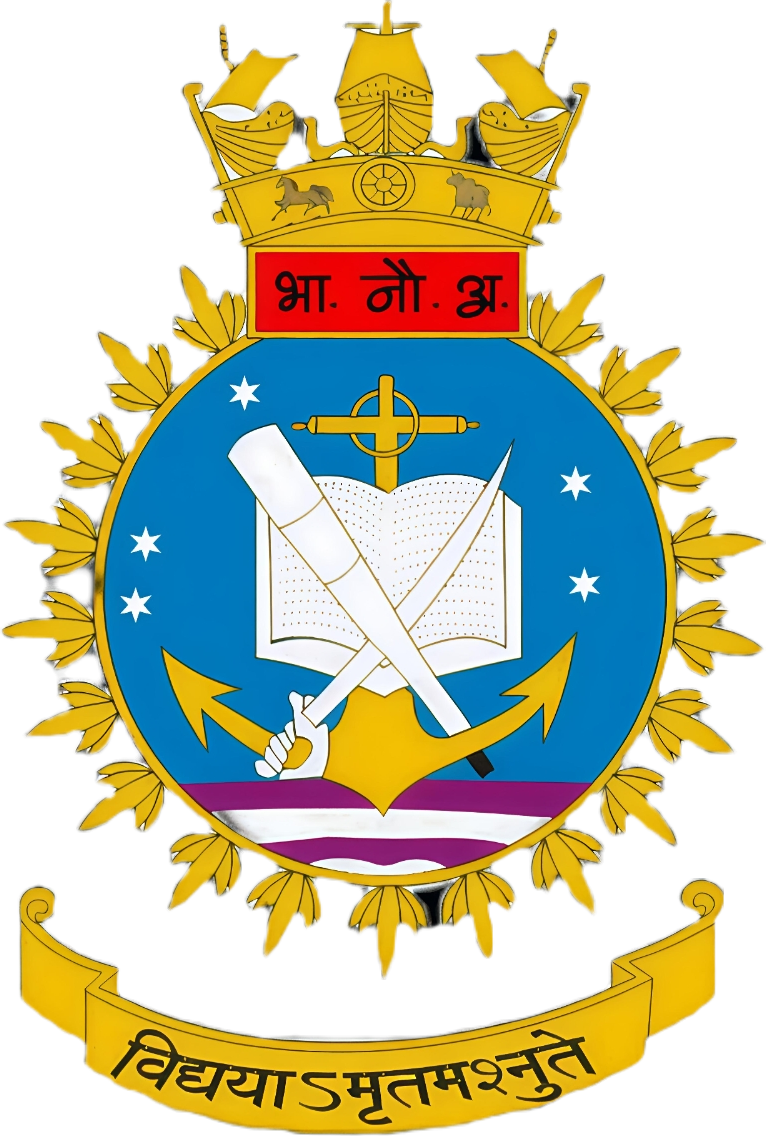
- Motto: विद्ययाऽमृतमश्नुते
- Motto in English: Vidyayā Amr̥taṁ Aśnute (Become Immortal Through Knowledge)
- Type: Defence Service training institute; Engineering training institute
- Established: May 1969 (Kochi); 1986 (at Mandovi, Goa); 8 January 2009 (at Ezhimala)
- Affiliations: Jawaharlal Nehru University (JNU); All India Council for Technical Education (AICTE); Indian Institutes of Technology (IIT)
- Commandant: Vice Admiral Manish Chadha, AVSM, VSM
- Undergraduates: 1,200
- Location: Ezhimala, Kannur, Kerala, India; 12°2′28″N 75°11′38″E
- Campus: 2,452 acres (9.92 km^{2}); Rural
- Elevation: 35 metres (115 ft)
- Colors: Navy Blue and Gold
- Website: https://www.ina.indiannavy.gov.in

The Indian Naval Academy (INA or INA Ezhimala) is the defence service training establishment for officer cadre of the Indian Navy and the Indian Coast Guard, located in Ezhimala, Kannur district, Kerala. Situated between Ezhimala hill and the Kavvayi backwaters, INA has a 7-kilometre beachfront on the Laccadive Sea. It conducts basic training for all officers inducted into the Indian Navy and Indian Coast Guard. It is Asia's largest and the world's third-largest naval academy.

The Naval Academy (NAVAC) was established in May 1969, and training of Orientation courses commenced in Aug 2005, while it was formally inaugurated on 8 January 2009, and the name was changed to Indian Naval Academy. It shares the 2,452-acre (9.92 km^{2}) site with the naval base depot, INS Zamorin, and the naval hospital, INHS Navjivani. The President's Colour was awarded to INA on 20 November 2019. The President’s Colour is the highest honour that is bestowed upon a military unit.

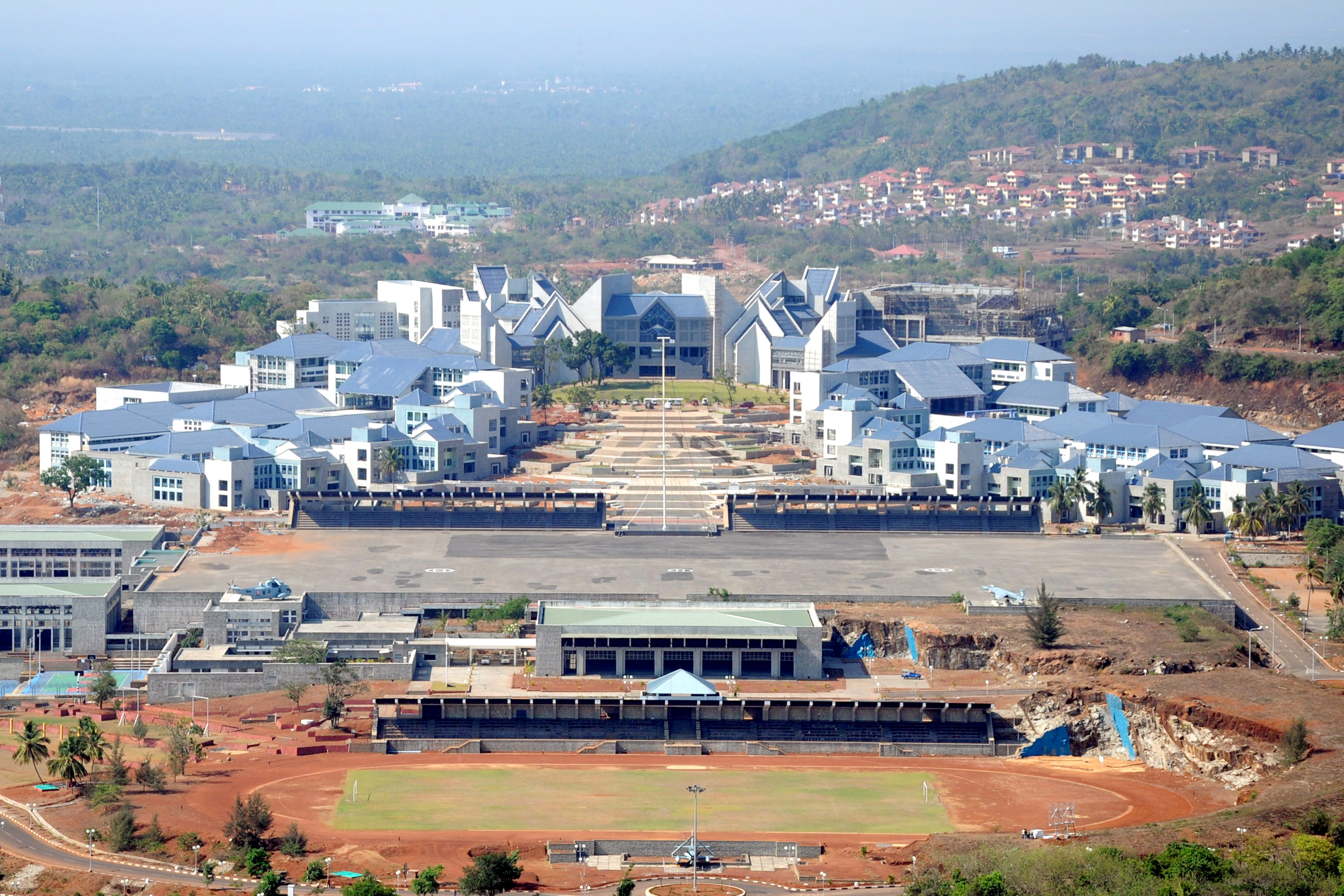
Indian Naval Academy (INA) (aerial view)

== History ==
=== Background ===
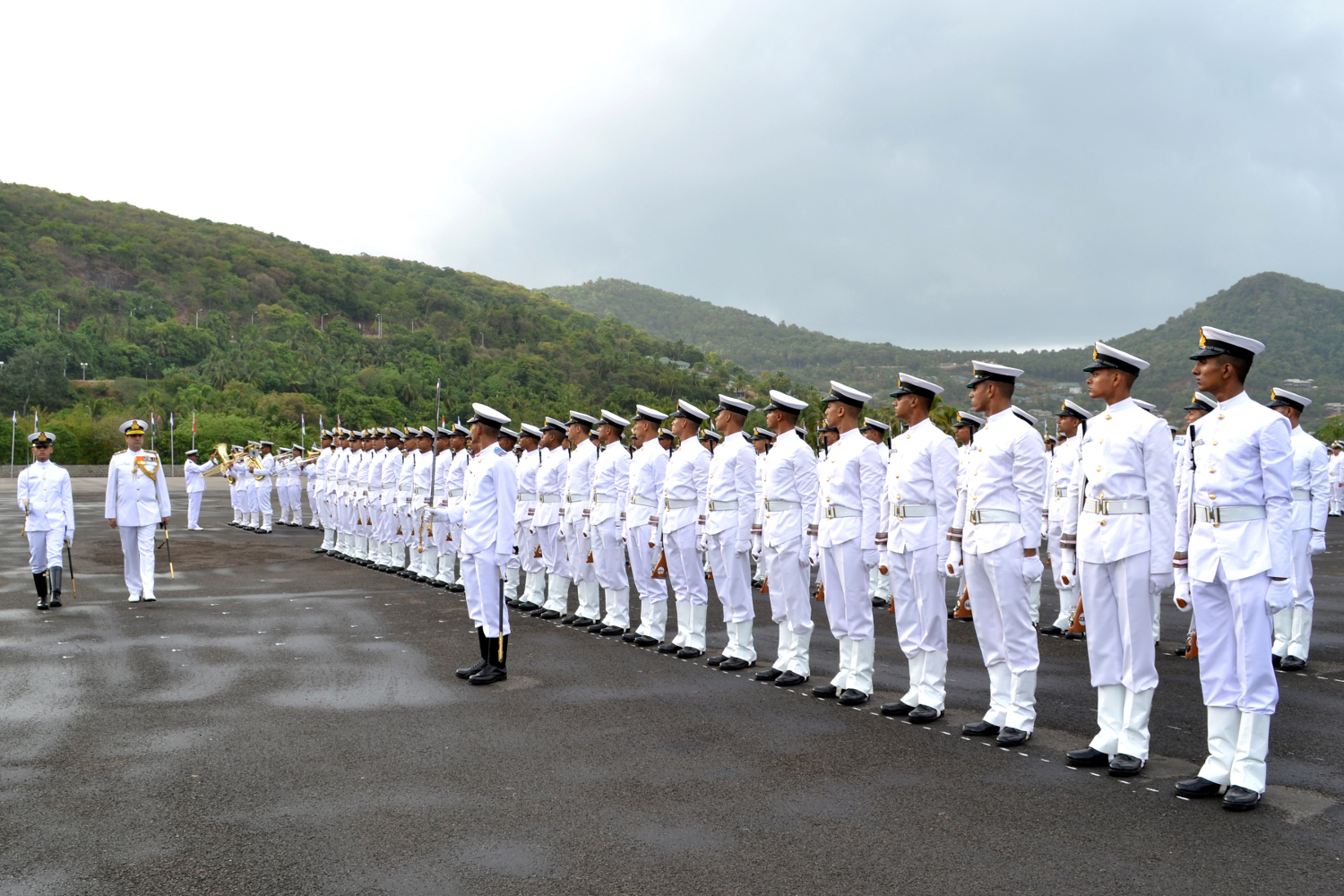
Guard of honour during a parade at INA.

Before independence, officer cadets of the Royal Indian Navy were trained in the United Kingdom with the Royal Navy. Cadets underwent four years of training in Dartmouth and were commissioned as Sub Lieutenants upon their return. In 1949, the officer training for the Navy began at the interim Joint Services Wing (JSW) of the Armed Forces Academy. The National Defence Academy (NDA) was established in 1954 as the Joint Services academy of the Indian Armed Forces.

By 1968, the Navy realised that the NDA could not keep up with its expanding staffing requirements. It also needed additional space and facilities to impart advanced maritime skills to officers and sailors. In May 1969, the Indian Naval Academy was established in Cochin to consolidate facilities for naval training. The academy was consolidated with the Officers training school, at INS Mandovi in Goa in 1986. But with the growing use of INS Mandovi as an operational naval base, as well as the existing Provost and Physical Training school at the location, the Naval Academy operated under considerable space constraints. In addition, providing basic training for Coast Guard officers at the academy further stretched the facilities. Hence, the Navy developed plans for a new permanent Naval Academy to cope with the increasing training load.

External videos
- Inside Indian Naval Academy, a 2018 documentary film by National Geographic

The initial requirement for the site for the academy was at least 100 acres (0.40 km^{2}), in the vicinity of the sea or a large lake for basic seamanship. The site had to be in the proximity of a railhead, yet at some distance from the neighbouring towns. Another requirement was relative proximity to a naval base, as well as a bracing and moderate climate. The space requirement was later revised to consolidate training efforts in a single location for cost-effective operation.

In 1979, the Government of India approved the development of a new campus for the Indian Naval Academy. The sites considered for the new Naval Academy were Aruvankadu near the Pykara Dam Lake in the Nilgiri Hills in the vicinity of Wellington Cantonment, a site near the Bhatghar Dam situated off the Pune-Kolhapur highway, Hesaraghatta Lake near Bangalore, Porbandar on the Saurashtra coast, Chengalpattu on the Tamil Nadu coast near Chennai and a, north of Kannur on the Kerala coast. The Government of Kerala was keen to host the academy in the state and offered the Navy 960 hectares at Ezhimala. It also offered essential infrastructure facilities like Ezhimala's water and electricity supply, approach roads and bridges, capital dredging of the Kavvayi backwaters (for basic rowing and small boat training), construction of a seawall to prevent erosion, as well as expansion of the nearest railway station at no cost to the navy. In 1982, the Central Government approved the construction of the academy at Ezhimala and granted the Kerala Government a soft, medium-term loan for acquiring the land from private owners and the resettlement of the evacuees. The first Commandant of the INA was Vice Admiral MP Muralidharan, and the first Deputy Commandant was Rear Admiral Kapil Gupta.

=== Construction ===
After delays in land acquisition, the foundation stone for the academy was laid by then prime minister Rajiv Gandhi on 17 January 1987. Soon after, in the wake of the 1991 India economic crisis, the central government was forced to cut back funding for the construction of the academy. Later, construction was stalled due to resulting from the land acquisition. Construction finally resumed in 1997-98.

On 6 April 2005, the naval base depot INS Zamorin was commissioned as a part of Phase I of the academy by then Chief Minister of Kerala, Oommen Chandy. The Ezhimala site is located on a promontory that was the capital of the Mooshika kingdom, who were rivals and later allies of the Zamorin rulers of Kozhikode. The Zamorins had a strong fleet of warships under the stewardship of the Kunjali Marakkars, which defeated the Portuguese in naval battles in the 16th century.

On 8 January 2009 the Indian Naval Academy, was inaugurated by then prime minister Manmohan Singh. Originally envisaged to cost ₹166 crore (equivalent to ₹23 billion or US$240 million in 2026) in 1987, the final project cost in 2009 was ₹721 crore (equivalent to ₹20 billion or US$210 million in 2026).

== Commandant ==
The Commandant is the head and is in charge of all the functioning of the Indian Naval Academy. The Commandant of the Academy is a Three-star rank officer holding the rank of Vice Admiral.

== Training establishment ==
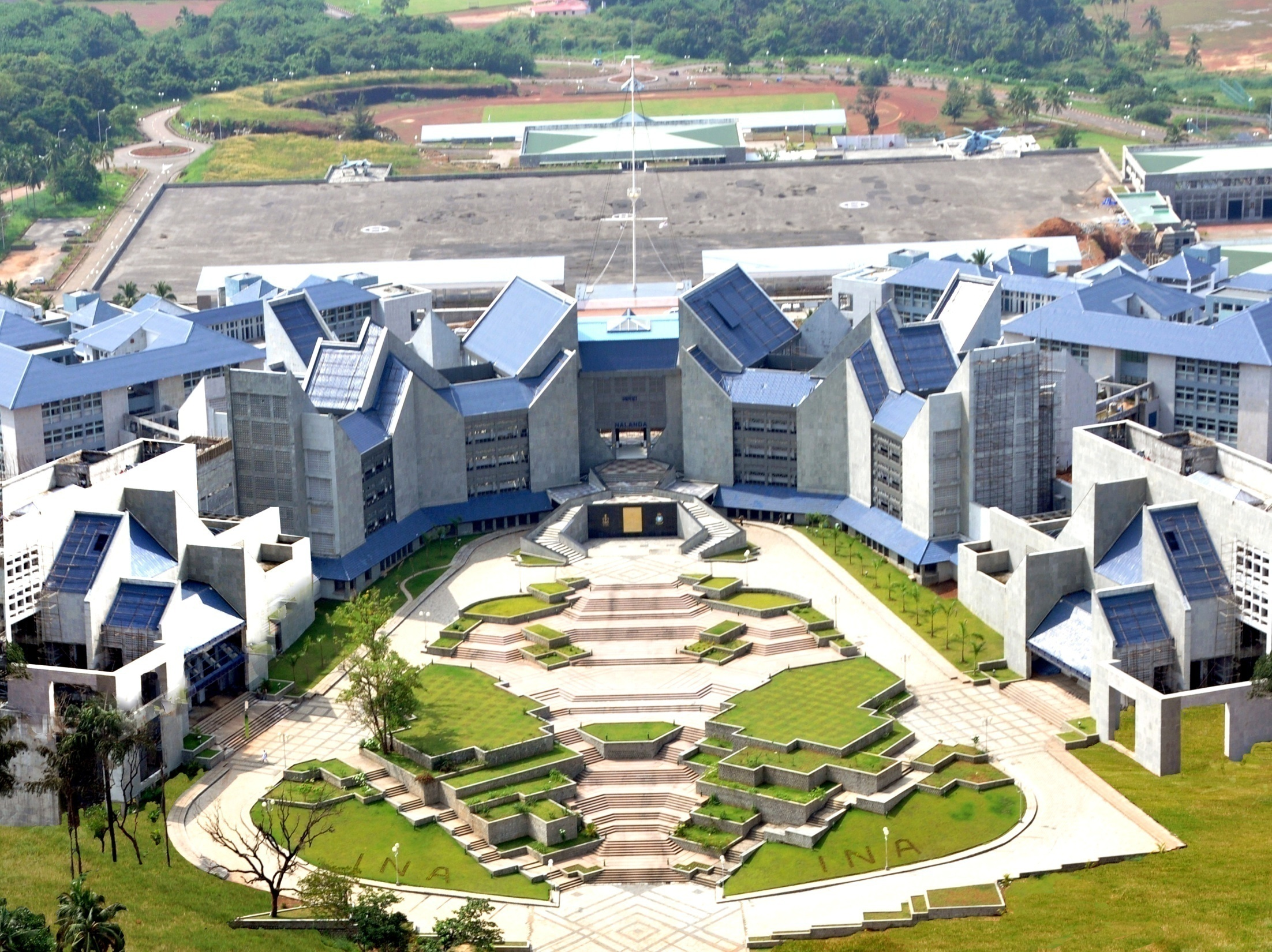
Nalanda Complex

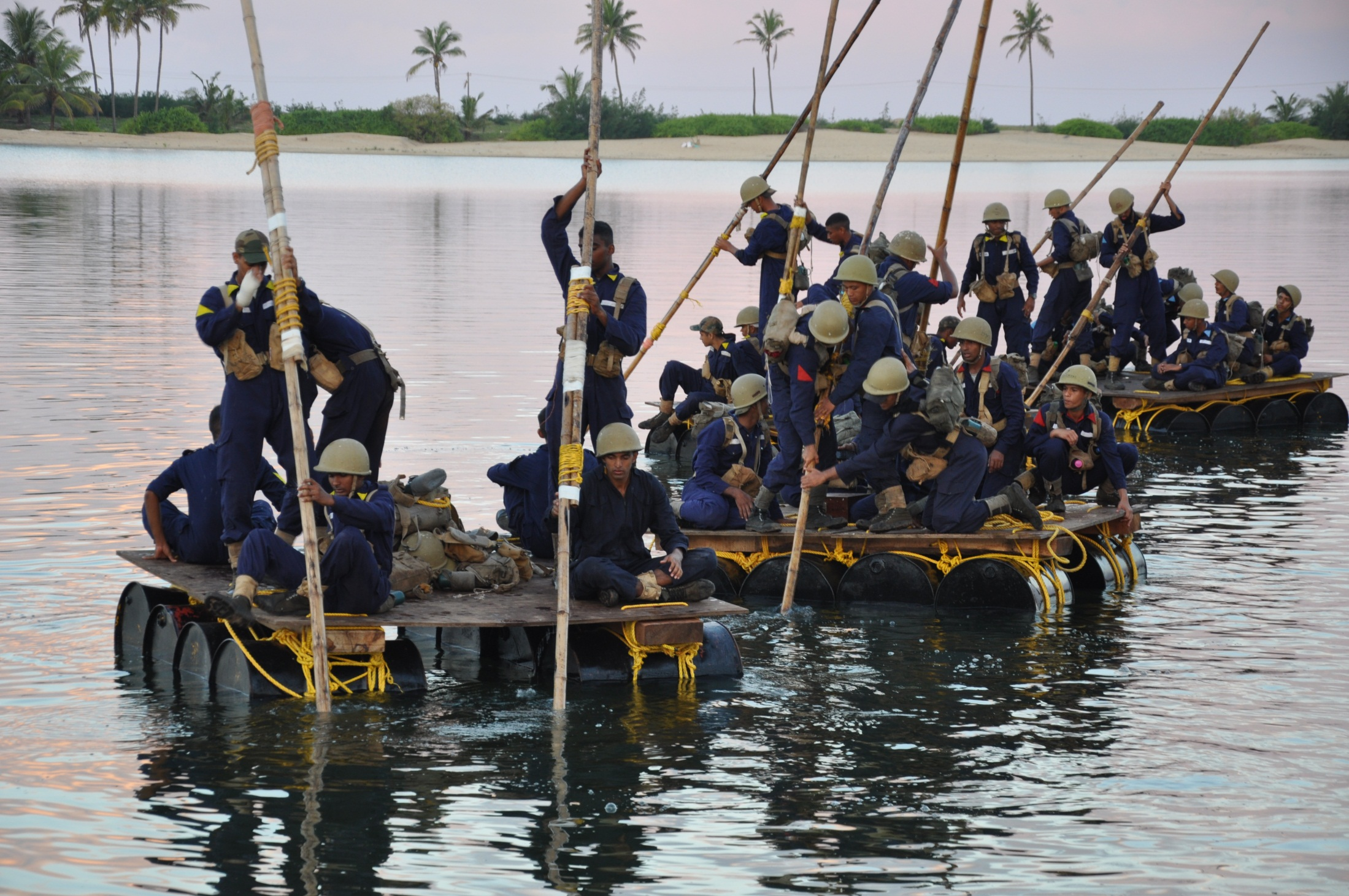
Marinised camps

=== Admission ===
Potential candidates for the undergraduate officer-trainee program of the Indian Navy apply through the NDA and NA exams conducted by the UPSC. The flagship course of the INA is the 10+2 Indian Naval Academy Course (INAC), in which a cadet undergoes training of four years in the academy. Also, the NDA cadets opting to join the Navy complete three years of joint training at NDA, Khadakwasla with the Army and Air Force cadets. They then transfer to INA for the next year. Candidates joining through 10+2 Navy Tech Entry have the option to major in Electronics & Communication Engineering, Mechanical Engineering or Naval Architecture and are awarded a Bachelor of Technology degree upon graduation. Upon graduation, cadets are commissioned as sub-lieutenants in the Navy. Cadets majoring in Naval Architecture have to undergo an additional 6 months of training at the Naval Dockyard, Visakhapatnam after graduation. They also have the option to enroll in additional post-graduate specialization in the field at the Indian Institute of Technology, Delhi.

Admission to INA as graduate officer-trainees of the Indian Navy is conducted through a written examination conducted by the UPSC, followed by 5 days of testing and interviews conducted by the Services Selection Board (SSB). These cover general aptitude, psychological testing, medical tests, team skills, as well as physical and social skills. For the Short Service Commission (SSC) officer-trainees, the selection is through merit. SSC officers have the option to apply for permanent commission based on their performance and track record. Graduating officers often go on for additional training or specialization in areas such as surface warfare, submarine warfare, naval aviation, etc., at other naval schools. Officers joining the Indian Coast Guard as assistant commandants also undergo basic training along with graduate officer-trainees of the Indian Navy.

=== Training ===
The training zone contains the main academic building complex, as well as physical training, aquatics, and outdoor-training complexes, auditoriums, a firing range, fields, cadets' mess, and cadets' squadrons. The main academic building complex is situated on the highest point of the academy. It includes the Service and Technical Training wings, laboratories, workshops, library, and an 1800-capacity auditorium. The academy accepts up to 1200 cadets for officer training each year. This includes final year training for naval cadets from the National Defence Academy and interim training facilities for the Indian Coast Guard.

== Campus ==
=== Location ===
Kannur, Kerala

The Indian Naval Academy, Ezhimala, is located approximately 35 km north of Kannur and 117 km south of Mangalore, on the west coast of peninsular India. The nearest railway station is at Payyanur, 8 km away. The nearest airport is Kannur International Airport, which is about 60 km southeast of Ezhimala. The INA is divided into three zones – a Training zone, an Administration zone and an Accommodation zone. It has a lighthouse (the Mt. Dilly Lighthouse) on its premises.

=== Administration ===
The administration zone consists of the Administrative Complex, the naval hospital INHS Navjivani, the logistics complex, the motor transport complex, and the campus fire station.

=== Accommodation ===
The academy has uniformed and civilian staff for training and administrative support. It had 161 officers, 47 professors/lecturers, 502 sailors, and 557 defense civilians in 2010. The campus includes accommodation facilities for staff and their families, with a capacity of about 4000.

=== INHS Navjivani ===
INHS Navjivani, which was commissioned on 12 December 2012, is a 64-bed naval hospital on the campus that provides healthcare to cadets, staff, and navy veterans.

=== Cadet life ===
On reporting at the academy, cadets are assigned to squadrons. Currently, there are 8 squadrons, namely - Achiever, Braveheart, Cheetah, Daredevil, Eagle, Fighter, Gladiator and Hurricane which are planned to be increased to 16. Each squadron consists of four divisions with approximately 60 cadets in each division. Each division is commanded by a commissioned officer with a minimum seniority of the rank of Lieutenant, responsible for monitoring, guidance, and counseling of the cadets, and is headed by a Divisional Cadet Captain (DCC). The squadron is headed by an officer of the rank of Lieutenant Commander. Squadron Cadet Captain (SCC) and Squadron Cadet Adjutant (SCA) ensure the proper functioning of the Squadrons. There is only one Flotilla now, comprising all six squadrons, and it is headed by the Flotilla Cadet Captain (FCC) and Flotilla Cadet Adjutant (FCA). The Academy is headed by the Academy Cadet Captain (ACC) and the Academy Cadet Adjutant (ACA). ACC is responsible for representing the cadets' interests to superior echelons within the Academy and representing the Academy externally, whereas the ACA is responsible for the overall operations and discipline of the entire Academy. The ACC and ACA together are the senior-most appointments in the Academy. Other officer cadet appointments include 1 FCC, 1 FCA, 6 SCC, 6 SCA, and 24 DCC(s).

Cadets are accommodated in individual rooms in the squadrons. Through the 4 years of Academy tenure, the cadets are trained in all aspects, such as physical training, swimming, drill, sports proficiency, equestrianism, cross-country running, and professional studies related to the navy and the military. When the Academy was at INS Mandovi, Goa, there were initially just 2 Squadrons, which later expanded to three, namely Mulla, Marakkar, and Angre Squadron - each with four divisions. Each of the Academy squadrons boasts of its own traditions and heritage, some of which have been carried forward from the erstwhile Academy at INS Mandovi.

== See also ==
- Indian Navy
- Ezhimala
- Indian Military Academy, Dehradun
- Air Force Academy, Dundigal
- Military Institute of Technology (MILIT), Pune
