= Indian Coast Guard Academy =

- Type: Military Training Institute
- Location: Mangalore, Karnataka, India
- Campus: 160 acres (0.65 km^{2})

The Indian Coast Guard Academy will be a military training institute for Indian Coast Guard personnel, which is currently under construction in Mangalore, Karnataka.

== History ==
Indian Coast Guard personnel were historically trained at the Indian Naval Academy (INA). Following the 2008 Mumbai attacks, the Indian government initiated a program to triple its coast guard's force, assets and infrastructure. Both the Navy and the government recognized that the increased intake cadets would further tax already-stretched navy facilities. This provided an added impetus for the Union Council of Ministers to approve the establishment of the academy in 2009.

The search for a site for the academy started in earnest in 2010. Various sites were considered, with the primary criterion being ample space on the coastal waterfront. The Government of Kerala was keen to host the site in the state. Consequently, the Minister for Industries and Commerce of Kerala prevailed upon the Kerala Industrial Infrastructure Development Corporation to transfer some of its unutilized land in the coastal town of Azhikkal to the coast guard for the academy. The transfer was completed on 24 February 2011. On 27 February, the then Defence Minister of India, A. K. Antony, announced the plans to start construction. The foundation stone was laid on 28 May 2011. The academy was planned on a 160 acres (0.65 km^{2}) campus near Valapattanam estuary on the Arabian Sea in Irinavu near Azhikkal in the Kannur district of northern Kerala. about 8 miles (13 km) south of the Naval Academy in Ezhimala. The two maritime academies were expected to share some training infrastructure in the Kerala backwaters. But the project was dropped in 2019 following the denial of environmental and Coastal Regulation Zone clearances by the Ministry of Environment, Forest and Climate Change because the project site fell within an area where no construction is permissible.

The academy was then shifted to Kenjar near Mangalore. 160 acres of land in possession of the Karnataka Industrial Areas Development Board has been allocated to build the academy.

== See also ==
- Indian National Defence University
- Military Academies in India
- Sainik school
