= College of Military Engineering, Pune =

Indian technical and tactical engineering training institution

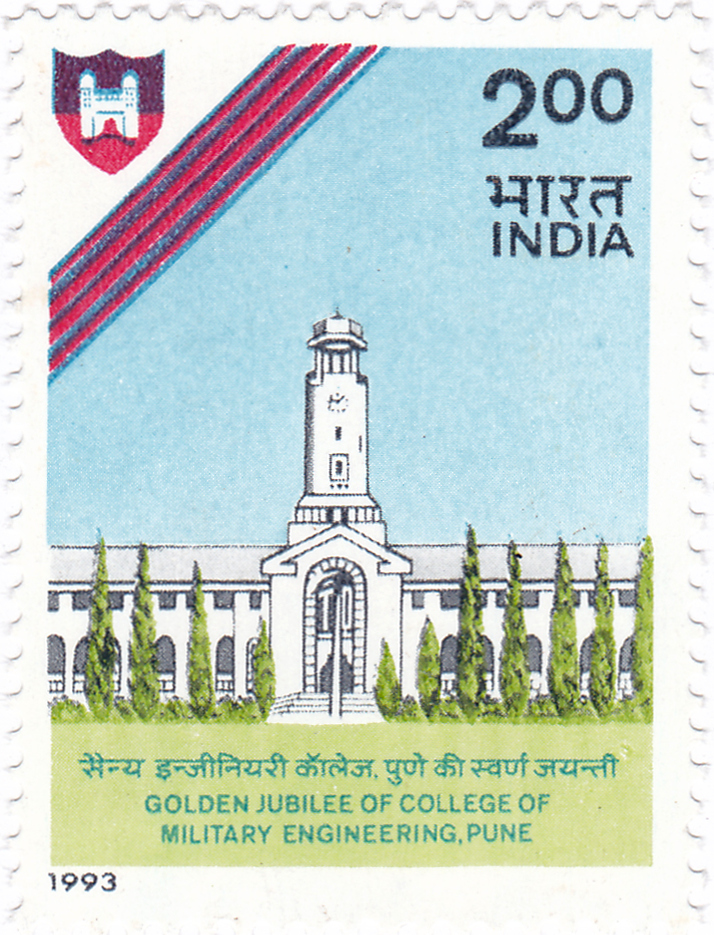
- A 1993 stamp dedicated to the 50th anniversary of CME
- Former names: School of Military Engineering (SME)
- Type: Engineering Training Institute
- Established: 1943; 83 years ago
- Affiliations: AICTE
- Academic affiliations: Jawaharlal Nehru University
- Commandant: Lt. Gen. A. K. Ramesh
- Students: 1500 (Approx)
- Location: Dapodi, Pune, India; 18.354°N 73.5014°E

College of Military Engineering (CME) is a technical and tactical engineering training institution of the Indian Army Corps of Engineers of the Indian Army. Training of Combat Engineers, Military Engineering Service, Border Roads Engineering Services (BRES) and Survey is done here.

The college it is situated at Dapodi on NH 4, adjacent to the Khadki cantonment, a large army base in Pune district, north of the Pune city. Established in 1943, as the 'School of Military Engineering' (SME) at Roorkee, post independence in 1948, SME moved to Dapodi in Pune. Apart from imparting training to Indian army officers and those from friendly countries, the college also plays an advisory role to the Indian Army, and is involved in research projects.

== History ==
=== Pre-Independence training ===
The first few officers to join the Corps were trained, not in India but, in UK at the Royal Military Academy, Woolwich, thereafter at Royal School of Military Engineering (RSME) Chatham, along with the Corps of Royal Engineers, and finally at Cambridge University for technical training. This system was discontinued from 1932. With the establishment of Indian Military Academy (IMA) at Dehradun, officers commissioned from IMA were attached to Bengal Sappers and Miners and attended a three-year Engineering Course at Thomson College, Roorkee. In 1940, after the outbreak of World War II, Officer Cadet Training Units (OCTU), later designated as Engineer Officers Training School were started in Bangalore, Kirkee and Roorkee.

Due to increase in demand for well trained Military Engineers, a new School of Military Engineering, on the lines of SME Chatham, was started in 1943 in the premises of Thomason College (now IIT Roorkee), adjoining the Bengal Sappers Centre in Roorkee, dedicated to imparting combat engineering training to officers.

=== Post-Independence history ===
A need was felt for the Corps to have its own bastion of learning due to the expansion of the Corps, and since plans were for Thomson College to be upgraded to a full fledged civilian-oriented University. Harris Bridge site, as the present site was then known, was reconnoitered in April 1946 and approved in July 1946. The move of the advance party coincided with countdown to Independence. The move was completed in 1948 and Brig RE Holloway became the first commandant in June 1948. First basic Engineering Degree Course commenced in June 1948 and the first Field Engineering Course in Feb 1949.

In November 1951, the SME was upgraded to the status of a college, with it degree engineering courses recognised by the Institution of Engineers. At the same time, in view of the increased responsibility and training facilities provided, the name was changed in the new location from "School of Military Engineering" to "College of Military Engineering". This was also in keeping with the higher status of the Degree Engineering Courses run by the school and recognition by the institution of Engineers. Work on permanent construction had commenced in 1948. Land had been acquired for the College and the pristine site acted as an incentive to the engineers and the architects. Soon labour and materials swamped the once barren ground and the Harris Bridge site became a busy hive of construction activity. Large and Commodious buildings were constructed along with the tree planting and landscaping. By about the middle of 1951, the Field Engineering and the ‘E & M’ wings as well as residential accommodation and three squash courts, were completed. The administrative wing was completed later. Work on permanent construction had commenced in 1948. Most of the accommodation was completed by 1958. Rapid expansion of the College took place after 1963 to cater for the increased intake necessitated by the expansion of the army after the 1962 Sino-Indian War.

== Courses ==
CME offers training for both Officers, Junior Commissioned Officers (JCOs) and Other Ranks (OR) of the Corps of Engineers, other arms & services, Indian Navy, Indian Air Force, Central Armed Police Forces, State Police and also civilians; students also include soldiers from Friendly Foreign Countries (FFC) such as the Maldives, Sri Lanka, Bangladesh, Nepal, Bhutan and African Nations. The college is affiliated to Jawaharlal Nehru University (JNU) for its combat training and B. Tech. / M. Tech. degrees. Its undergraduate and postgraduate courses are recognised by the 'All India Council for Technical Education (AICTE) and Savitribai Phule Pune University (SPPU), Pune and has got NAAC 'A' Grading.

- Courses for Engineering Officers:
  - B Tech in Civil, Electrical & Mechanical
  - M Tech in Civil Engineering
  - M Tech in Electrical Engineering
- Diploma Courses for JCO/ OR:
  - Diploma in Civil Engineering
  - Diploma in Mechanical Engineering
  - Diploma in Architectural Assistance
  - Diploma in Geo-Informatics

== The Campus ==
The College campus is spread over an area of 3600 acres. It is situated on the banks of Mula river, is a well maintained and environment friendly campus and with a population of approximately 8,000, has evolved into a small township. Access is available only to military personnel and civilians working or living inside CME. A gate pass (identification) is required to enter the CME premises.

=== Notable places in CME ===
- Headquarter Building – One of the first buildings to be construct in the College in the early fifties, this imposing structure is constructed of stone quarried from the rocky outcrop located West of the bldg (adjacent to the structure). These quarries (excavations) are now adorned by vintage bridges of the Sappers, and are an integral part of the Corps Equipment Museum. The Headquarter building is a heritage building and stands testimony of the design and construction skills of the Corps.
- Sarvatra Hall – The idea to have an ‘Assembly Hall’ to conduct central lectures was conceptualized by Brig SK Bose, then Commandant CME, and was constructed in 1958. The hall was later rechristened as the ‘Sarvatra Hall’ in consonance with the Corps of Engineers motto. The hall is located centrally with proximity to most of the Faculties. “Sarvatra Hall” has a total seating capacity of 421 seats, with 81 seats in the shallow balcony at the rear. It has seen a host of events over the years which include graduation (convocation) ceremonies of degree and diploma courses, central lectures, English and Hindi plays, musical evenings, social functions and a host of other events.
- HeadquarterMess, Corps of Engineers – Headquarter Mess, CME which was constructed in April 1954, is another imposing edifice which stands proudly within the College. It overlooks two large and well-maintained gardens, one in front, and the other to the rear of the building. Two large, near identical halls provide a lounge and dining facilities to officers. Apart from this it boasts of an Annexe, two bars, and a variety of flavours in terms of wining and dining for a strength of approximate 400 officers. The facilities available at the Headquarter Mess include Billiards and Pool and a well-equipped library. It remains a hallowed institution for the Sappers.
- CME Library – The CME Library is located in the Campus and forms an integral part of print and e-resource providing technical and general literature for all student and staff. The library is equipped with over 1 Lakh print resources and 150 online resources.
- Corps of Engineers Archives & Museum – The Corps of Engineers Archives and Museum is located in the Campus and forms the foundation for ensuring that the history and heritage of the Corps is preserved for posterity. Earlier location in the Headquarter building, it relocated to its present building in 1973, sharing space with another portal of learning, the Central Lib. It comprises the Archives room and collections, Media room, Main Gallery, Combat and Works Halls. In addition, it has a digitization sec and a conservation laboratory. Containing a number of collections of documents, media and memorabilia it ensures the history of the Corps is available for the coming generations and form a precious and noteworthy heritage asset for the Corps the Engineers and the Indian Army.
- Harkirat Singh Theatre – Harkirat Singh Open Air Theatre (HSOAT), has been named after Brigadier Harkirat Singh (Commandant of the College from 22 March 1955 to 18 June 1957). It was constructed in the year 1956. This iconic open-air theatre serves the requirement of the entire CME populace. With a capacity of 1,570 persons, it has also been hosting numerous functions and Sainik Sammelans. It remains a favourite haunt for all irrespective of rain, hail or wind, and possibly even snow; should it ever come to that.
- The CME Rowing Channel – Rowing at CME dates back to 1948 when the CME Rowing Club was established on the banks of the Mula River, next to the Sailing Club. The Corps rowing club was christened ‘CERA’, the Corps of Engineers Rowing Association, and it has nurtured many medal winners at the Asiad and other international championships. The Rowing Federation of India (RFI) was also born through the efforts of CERA, which was a founding member. The first medal winners in the country in rowing have learnt their skills and trained at this course. Today, this course is unused, but it is hallowed ground for the Corps as it nurtured some of the best rowers in the country. Later this dream for rowing has led to the construction of India’s only international level rowing channel, where rowers of the Services, the Army and the country undergo their training.
- CME Shopping Complex- The Shopping Complex has served as a meeting spot for a number of generations of serving persons and their families, as also for the large number of civil inhabitants of the College. Evolving over the years, it has ensured that the best of shopping facilities and amenities are available to the shopper, or those who visit. Two banks are also located within its premises, while the Unit Run Canteen located adjacent to it complements it suitably. A favourite spot, of the YOs and the degree courses, especially after games and physical activities, it is always heavily subscribed and a popular meeting spot inside the college

== Faculties & Wings in CME ==
- Faculty of Combat Engineering
- Faculty of Civil Engineering
- Faculty of Electrical & Mechanical Engineering
- Faculty of Chemical Biological Radiological & Nuclear Protection
- Faculty of Construction Management
- Faculty of Geo Spatial Sciences
- Information Technology Wing
- Cadets Training Wing
- Administration Wing
- Soil Engineering and Material Testing Wing

== Schools in CME ==
- Kendriya Vidyalaya (KV CME) – Affiliated to CBSE, up to Class 12.
- Holloway Army Pre Primary School – Kindergarten.
- Regimental School – affiliated to MSBSHSE.

== See also ==
- Indian National Defence University
- Military Academies in India
- Sainik School
