= Rashtriya Military School, Dholpur =

School in Dholpur, Rajasthan, India

Rashtriya Military School Dholpur
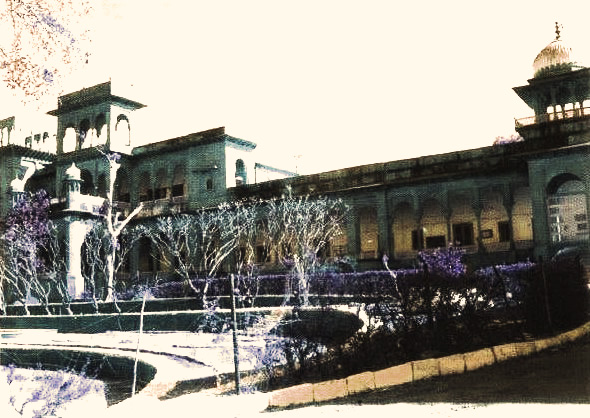
- Kesarbagh palace, the mansion of the former ruler of the erstwhile Dholpur State, now houses the Rashtriya Military School, Dholpur

Rashtriya Military School, Dholpur is one of five military schools of India. It is situated in Dholpur in Rajasthan and was established in 1962 by a former defence minister, Krishnan Menon, to facilitate education of the children of the Defense personnel as well as the civilians. Military Schools in India were previously known as King George Royal Indian Military College.

It was established in 1962 and is one of only five RMS (Rashtriya Military School, formerly called Royal Indian Military Schools) of its kind in India; the other four being Chail Military School founded in 1922, Ajmer Military School in 1930, Belgaum Military School in 1945, and Bangalore Military School in 1946. RIMC (established in 1922), RMSs and various Sainik Schools contribute 25% to 30% to various training academies of the Armed Forces. 1 RIMC and 5 RMS were established by the government after the World War I to Indianise the British Colonial Military in India by providing western style education with the aim to prepare the potential pool of future military officers. Oldest private military school is Bhonsala Military School established in 1937, which is not a RMS.

The school is housed in Kesarbagh palace, the mansion of the former ruler of the erstwhile Dholpur State. It is 10 kilometres (6.2 mi) away from Dholpur City on the Dholpur-Bari Road. Dholpur is situated between Agra and Gwalior and is 250 kilometres (160 mi) away from Delhi.

The school is affiliated to CBSE. It is an English medium boarding school coming under the Ministry Of Defence. Unit tests are held quarterly in addition to half yearly and annual examinations. Students appear for AISSCE (10th) and AISSE (12th) along with other CBSE affiliated schools in India. Student to staff ratio is about 2.5:1 and student to teaching staff ratio is 10:1 which is far above the national average of India. Staff are recruited by central government from all over India. Students are offered Science subject in 11th and 12th classes. School curriculum includes seven periods of 40 minutes each. Daily three hours of compulsory prep is included in a routine for students to concentrate on studies.

== History ==
Established in 1962, the Dholpur Military School is the youngest military school in India. It is one of the Rashtriya Military Schools (RMS). All RMS, under the direct control of Directorate General of Military Training (DGMT), are Category 'A' military training institutes at par with Rashtriya Indian Military College (RIMC) and National Defence Academy.

The primary aim of the RMS is to prepare students for the All India Senior Secondary School Certificate Examination of the Central Board of Secondary Education, New Delhi. The school also prepares boys who wish to join the Indian Armed Forces for the entrance examination of National Defence Academy. Boys between the age of 10–12 years are eligible for admission to school from Class VI onward. Alumni of the five RMS are known as "Georgians" after their founder father.

== The school ==
The school is a category ‘A’ establishment of the Army and is administrated by the Directorate General of Military Training at IHQ of MOD (Army). It is under Army. The Central Governing Council, headed by the Defence Secretary, Ministry of Defence is the apex body for the school. The school prepares boys from the age of 10 to 18 years for the All India Secondary School Examination and All India Senior School Certificate Examination, New Delhi and also for Entrance Examination to the National Defence Academy.

The school is affiliated to the CBSE board of India. Unit tests are held quarterly in addition to half yearly and annual examinations. Students appear for AISSCE (10th) and AISSE (12th) along with other CBSE affiliated schools in India. Student to staff ratio is about 2.5:1 and student to teaching staff ratio is 10:1 which is far above the national average of India. Staff are recruited by central government from all over India. Students are offered Science subject in 11th and 12th classes. School curriculum includes seven periods of 40 minutes each. Daily three hours of compulsory prep is included in a routine for students to concentrate on studies.

School Annual Day is held in December when a cultural programme is held in honour of the chief guest (usually a Senior and Decorated Army Officer) who distributes prizes for achievement in academics, co-curricular and sport.

School has three head of institutes - the principal, the administrative officer and MIE (Master in charge Education). The school educates pupils from class 6th to 12th with the aim to train and prepare the cadets for NDA. Cadets in class 12th are given special responsibility such as school captains and House captains.

Rashtriya Military School, Dholpur
Location
Kesarbagh palace Dholpur Rajasthan India
Information
Type	Military school
Motto	Sheelam Param Bhusnam(Character is the Greatest Virtue)
Established	1962
School district	Dholpur
Principal	Lt Col Amit Sharma
Head of school	DGMT
Staff	100
Faculty	20
Grades	Class 6-12
Number of students	350
Campus type	Boarding school
Colour(s)	Light blue and dark blue
Affiliation	CBSE
Founder	King George V
Houses	6 [Chittor, Nalanda, Vikram, Shivaji, Ujjain, and Udaibhan]
Champion of Champion	Nalanda House (12 titles)
Champion of Champion (current)	Udaibhan House (2024–25)
Website	rashtriyamilitaryschools.in/dholpur

== Academic campus ==
The school buildings are located on two adjacent hills, the one on Kesarbagh hill is the Academic campus, and the hostel and residences are located on the adjacent hill some times referred as Residential Block (new campus).

=== Academic block ===
Besides the Academic block the Kesarbagh Hill Fort houses a post office, Police Chowki, swimming pool, golf course, tennis court and craft room. The school houses a library.

=== Residential block ===
There are six hostels - Nalanda, Vikram(Old name Jagan), Shivaji (old name Vikram), Udaibhan, Chittor and Ujjain. Along with hostels the new campus has the Principal's residence, cadet's mess, Vivekanand Hall, VIP guest house, guest house, cafeteria, CSD canteen, MI Room, staff residence, Temple, basketball courts, lawn tennis courts, gymnasium, boxing ring, obstacles. Stairs from the new campus lead to play grounds for daily games activities. There are three lakes around the campus - India Lake, Pakistan Lake and Duck Lake (getting their name due to their physical shape).

Every hostel has two floors, with Junior Dorm, Middle dorm and Box Room on the first floor and Senior dorm in one side and Preparation Room, Recreation Room and warden office on the other. A house is under command of a House Captain. School is commanded by a School Captain, School Adjutant, a CCA Captain and a Sports Captain.

== Campus life ==
=== Typical day ===
A typical day in a cadet's life starts at 0500 hrs. with PT, followed by breakfast, assembly, classes at Kesarbagh Fort (with tea break at 1115 hrs.) till 1300 hrs., then lunch at cadet's mess, noon prep, evening games, wash and change, evening prep, dinner at 2000 hrs. and after dinner prep until lights out at 2200 hrs.

=== NCC ===
NCC is a part of cadet activities and there are hobby clubs catering to cadet's interest.

=== CCA ===
CCA (Co-Curricular Activities) are part of the school curriculum. Cadets participate in debates, declamations, quizzes, extempore, dance, theatre, poetry recitation in English and Hindi. They also participate in inter house and inter school arts competitions. The school team is a participant in national and state level CCA meets.

For the Janamasthami festival cadets hunt through the night to collect flowers from campus and decorate their temples throughout the day which are visited by everyone in the evening.

=== Sports and physical education ===
Cadets undergo compulsory physical training in the morning and play sports in the evening. The school has facilities for football, basketball, volleyball, athletics, cross-country, boxing, table tennis, lawn tennis, squash and badminton. The school is a member of the Indian Public Schools' Conference (IPSC) and participates in state as well as national level sports competitions. The Inter Military Schools Pentangular meet is an annual sports and CCA event where all five military schools (and previously Rashtriya Indian Military College Dehradun) compete in several field.

Cadets undergo compulsory physical training in the morning and play sports in the evening. The school has facilities for cricket, hockey, basketball, volleyball, athletics, cross-country, boxing, cycling, hiking and mountaineering. The school is a member of the Indian Public Schools' Conference (IPSC) and participates in state as well as national level sports competitions. In 2007, cadets won six gold, seven silver and two bronze in the CBSE cluster XIII Athletics meet held at Chandigarh. The Inter Military Schools Pentangular meet is an annual sports and CCA event where all five military schools (and previously Rashtriya Indian Military College Dehradun) compete in several field.

== Commandants and Principals ==
Ser No	Name	Period
1	Lt Col KL Ghai, AEC	16 Jul 1962 – 20 Dec 1968
2	Lt Col Rampal, AEC	21 Jan 1969 – 30 Mar 1976
3	Mr OP Bhatnagar	31 Mar 1976 – 20 Apr 1986
4	Mr KK Arora	24 Jul 1986 – 8 Nov 1986
5	Mr L William	9 Nov 1986 – 31 Mar 1987
6	Lt Col BR Sharma, AEC	9 May 1987 – 3 Mar 1990
7	Dr Sampurnanand Pandey	5 Jul 1990 – 6 May 1992
8	Lt Col Rajkumar, AEC	29 Jun 1992 – 15 Sep 1994
9	Lt Col SS Nair, AEC	16 Sep 1994 – 25 Oct 1998
10	Lt Col Ranjit Singh, AEC	26 Oct 1998 – 8 Sep 2000
11	Lt Col Arun Chopra, AEC	9 Sep 2000 – 7 Jun 2003
12	Lt Col K Ramam, AEC	8 Jun 2003 – 2 Jan 2005
13	Lt Col Arun Datta, AEC	3 Jan 2005 – 17 Jul 2006
14	Mr NC Dash	18 Jul 2006 – 2 Apr 2011
15	Lt Col T Chakravarty, AEC	3 Apr 2011 – 26 Feb 2014
16	Lt Col Abhishek Bhardwaj, AEC	27 Feb 2014 – 22 Mar 2017
17	Lt Col Nilesh Ingle, AEC	23 Mar 2017 to 28 July 2020
18	Lt Col Shyam Krishna TP, AEC	29 July 2020 to 29 Oct 2023
19	Lt Col Amit Sharma	07 Nov 2023 to date

== Distinguished Alumni ==
The school has produced numerous Generals (Lt Gen and Maj Gen), Brigadiers and thousands of Colonels and Lt Colonels along with Governors, Ministers, Civil servants, Actors and Business Tycoons.

- Akhilesh Yadav – Member of Lok Sabha and former Chief Minister of Uttar Pradesh.

== See also ==
- National Cadet Corps (India) (NCC)
- National Police Cadet Corps (India) (NPCC)
- National Service Scheme (NSS)
- Rashtriya Indian Military College (RIMC)
- Sainik School
