= Belgaum Military School =

Rashtriya Military School Belgaum
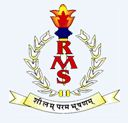

Location
- Belgaum, Karnataka; India; 15°52′59″N 74°34′59″E

Information
- Type: Military school
- Motto: Sheelam Param Bhushanam (Character is the Highest Virtue)
- Established: 1945; 81 years ago
- School district: Belgaum
- Head of school: Director General of Military Training (DGMT)
- Staff: 100
- Faculty: 40
- Grades: Class 6-12
- Enrollment: 300 approx.
- Campus size: 64-acre (0.26 km^{2})
- Campus type: Residential School
- Colours: Light blue and dark blue
- Affiliation: CBSE, New Delhi
- Information: Military establishment where young boys are trained to join Armed forces
- Founder: King George V
- Pratap: Blue
- Ranjit: Green
- Ashoka: Yellow
- Shivaji: Red
- Website: [www.rashtriyamilitaryschoolbelgaum.in//] RMS Belgaum

Rashtriya Military School, Belgaum is one of five military schools in India. Entrance tests for the military schools are held every year in December. About 70,000 to 80,000 students attend this test and around 350 students are selected. The schools are run by the Ministry of Defence, Government of India.

It was established in 1945 and it is one of the only five RMS (Rashtriya Military School which was formerly called Royal Indian Military School) of its kind in India; the other four being Chail Military School founded in 1922, Ajmer Military School in 1930, Bangalore Military School in 1946 and Dholpur Military School in 1962. RIMC (established in 1922), RIMs and various Sainik Schools contribute 25% to 30% to various training academies of the Armed Forces. 1 RIMC and 5 RMS were established by the government after World War I to Indianise the British Colonial Military in India by providing western style education to prepare the potential pool of future military officers.

== History ==
Established in 1945, the Belgaum Military School is one of the Rashtriya Military Schools (RMS). All RMS, under the direct control of Directorate General of Military Training (DGMT), are Category 'A' military training institutes at par with Rashtriya Indian Military College (RIMS) and National Defence Academy. All finance, training, admission, and recruitment instructions are received directly from Army Head Quarters AHQ (MT-15). General Officer Commanding, Karnataka, Kerala, and Goa Sub Area is the Chairman of the Local Board of Administration. On 1 January 1966, the school was renamed "Belgaum Military School", Belgaum. In January 1998 the prefix ‘Belgaum’ was dropped and the School was re-designated "Military School, Belgaum". At the thirteenth meeting of the Central Governing Council held on 23 Oct 1990, the aim of a Military School was defined as: "Military Schools aim to impart quality education and prepare cadets to join the Defence Services".

The school has an area of 64.13 acres (259,500 m^{2}) which in addition to the buildings includes 14 playgrounds like cricket, football, hockey, athletics track, baseball, volleyball, swimming pool, and squash court. The school buildings include the Main Office Block, Boys' Hostels, Cadets Mess, Academic block, Temple and Old Assembly Hall, New Assembly Hall, Gymnasium, QM Stores and Canteen, MI Room, and Staff Accommodation. The primary aim of the RMS is to prepare students for the All India Senior Secondary School Certificate Examination of the Central Board of Secondary Education, New Delhi. The school also prepares boys who wish to join the Indian Armed Forces for the National Defence Academy entrance examination. Boys between the age of 10–12 years are eligible for admission to school from Class VI onward. Alumni of the five RMS are known as Georgians after their founder father.

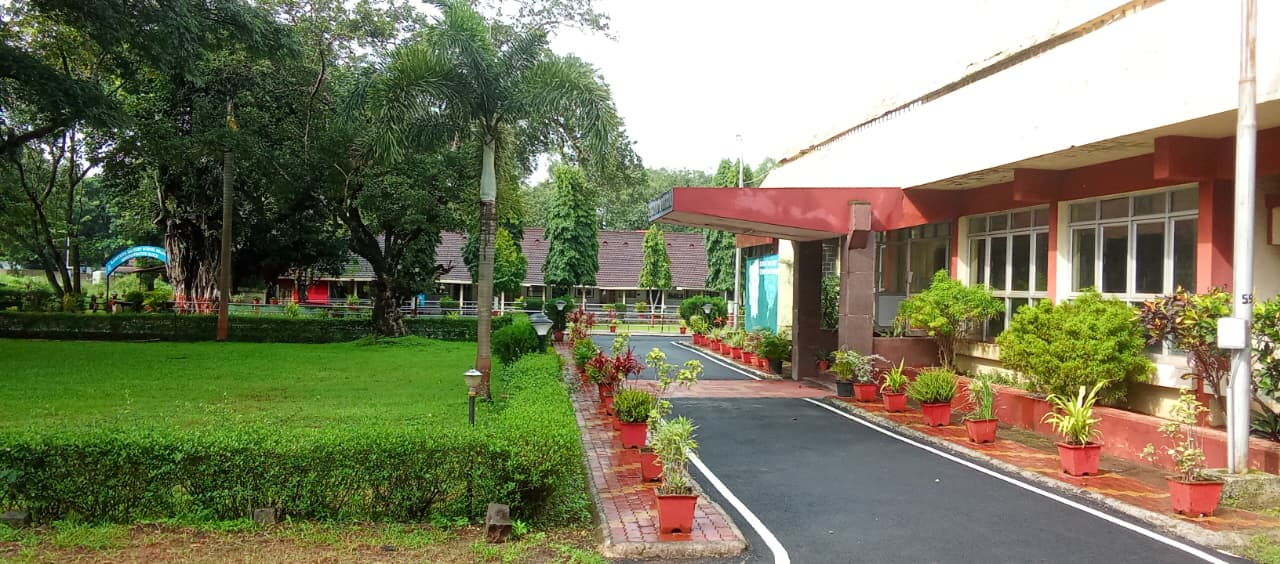
School Auditorium of Rashtriya Military School Belgaum

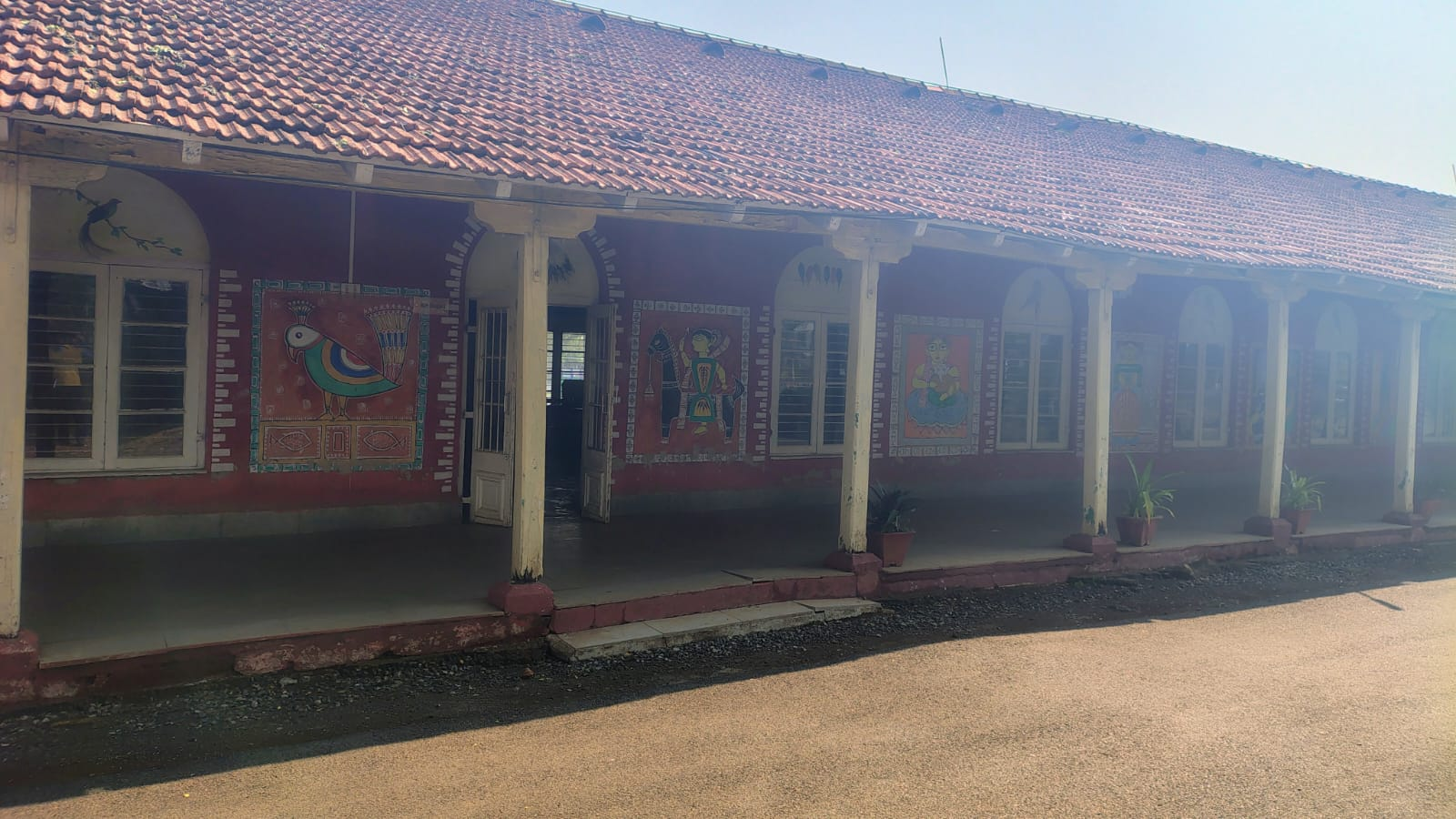
Art Gallery

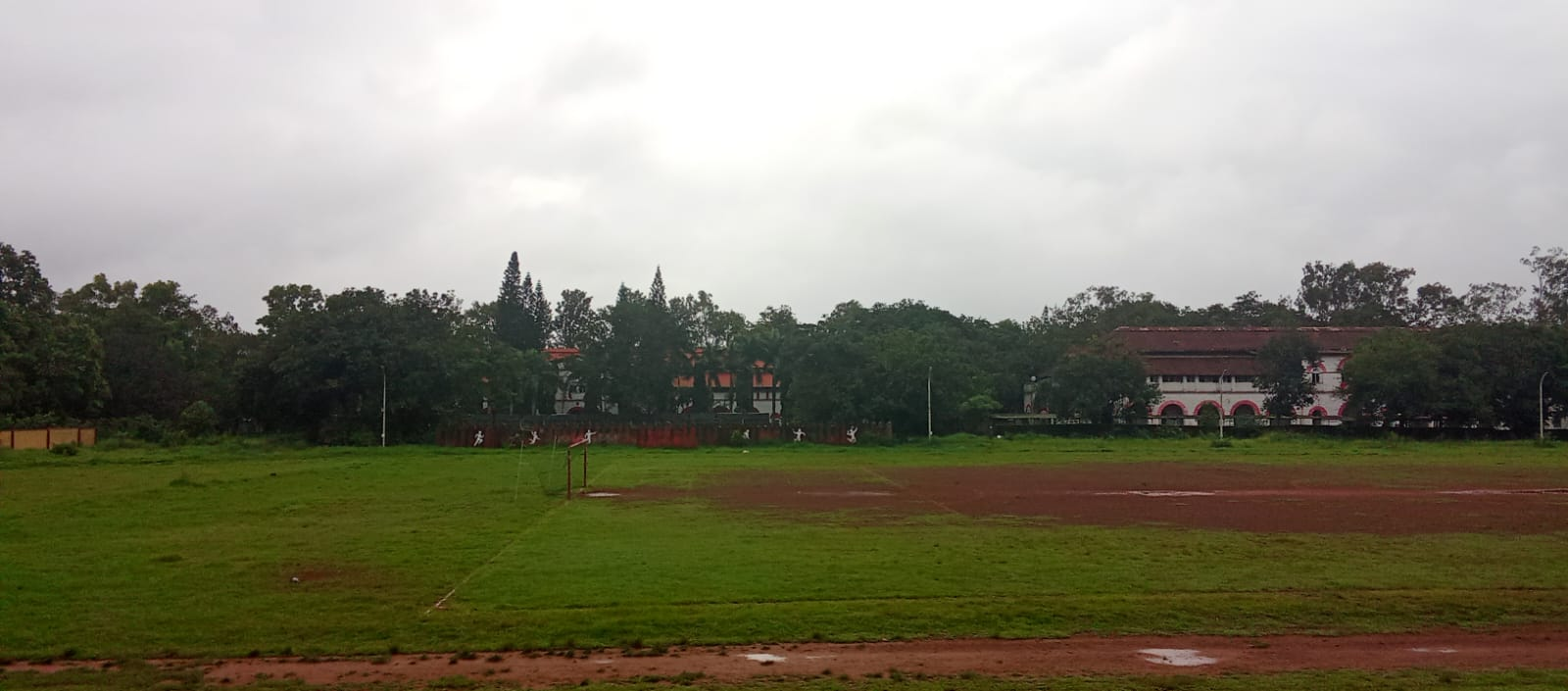
School Ground

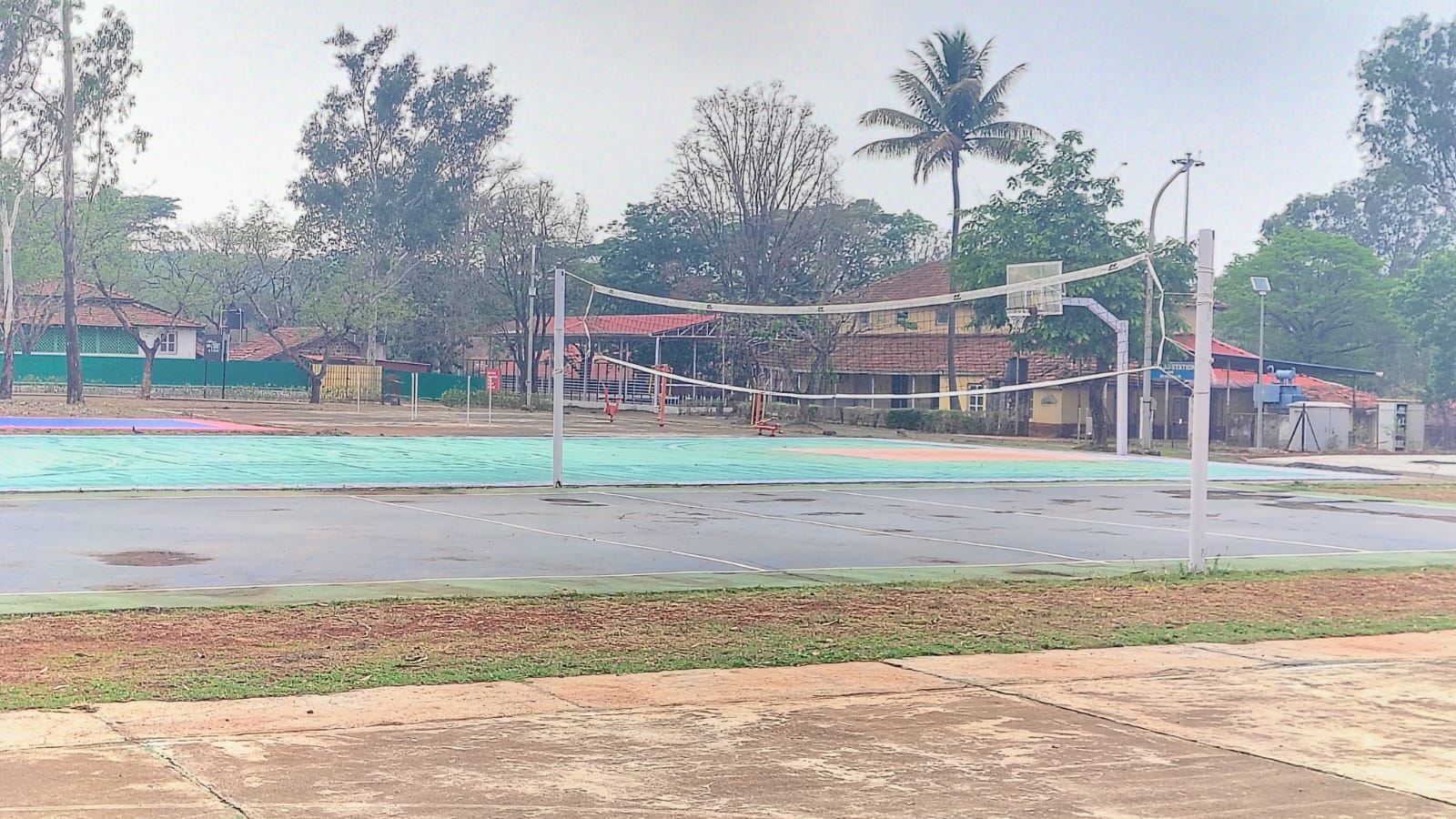
Sports facilities

== Notable alumni ==
- Kumud Mishra, Indian film actor
- Ashok Lavasa, Former Election Commissioner
- Baba Kalyani, Kalyani Group

== See also ==
- National Cadet Corps (India) (NCC)
- National Service Scheme (NSS)
- Rashtriya Indian Military College (RIMC)
- Sainik School
- Senior Officers' School, Belgaum
