= Bangalore Military School =

Rashtriya Military School, Bengaluru (National Military School, Bengaluru)
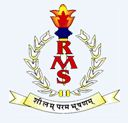

Location
- Bangalore, Karnataka; India; 12.962372°N 77.608505°E

Information
- Type: Military boarding school
- Motto: शीलं परम भूषणम् (Sheelam Param Bhushanam) (Character is the highest virtue)
- Established: 1946; 80 years ago
- Founder: King George The VI
- School board: CBSE
- Principal: Lt. Col. K. Anup Nair, AEC
- Grades: 6–12
- Gender: Boys and Girls
- Campus size: 68 acres (0.28 km^{2})
- Houses: Nehru 🟦 Rajaji🟥 Shastri🟩Tagore🟨
- Colours: Light blue and dark blue
- Website: www.rashtriyamilitaryschools.edu.in

Rashtriya Military School, Bangalore (transl. National Military School, Bangalore) is a military boarding school in Bangalore, Karnataka, India. It was established on 1 August 1946 and is one of only five RMS (Rashtriya Military School, formerly called Royal Indian Military Schools) of its kind in India; the other four being Chail Military School established in 1922, Ajmer Military School in 1930, Belgaum Military School in 1945, and Dholpur Military School in 1962. The cadets enrolled in these schools are known as Georgians, after their founder father King George VI.

RIMC (established in 1922), 5 RMSs and various Sainik Schools contribute 30% to 40% to various training academies of the Armed Forces. RIMC and RMS (Rashtriya Military School which were formerly called Royal Indian Military Schools) were established by the government after the World War I to Indianise the British Colonial Military in India by providing western style education with the aim to prepare the potential pool of future military officers. Oldest private military school is Bhonsala Military School established in 1937, which is not a RMS.

== History ==
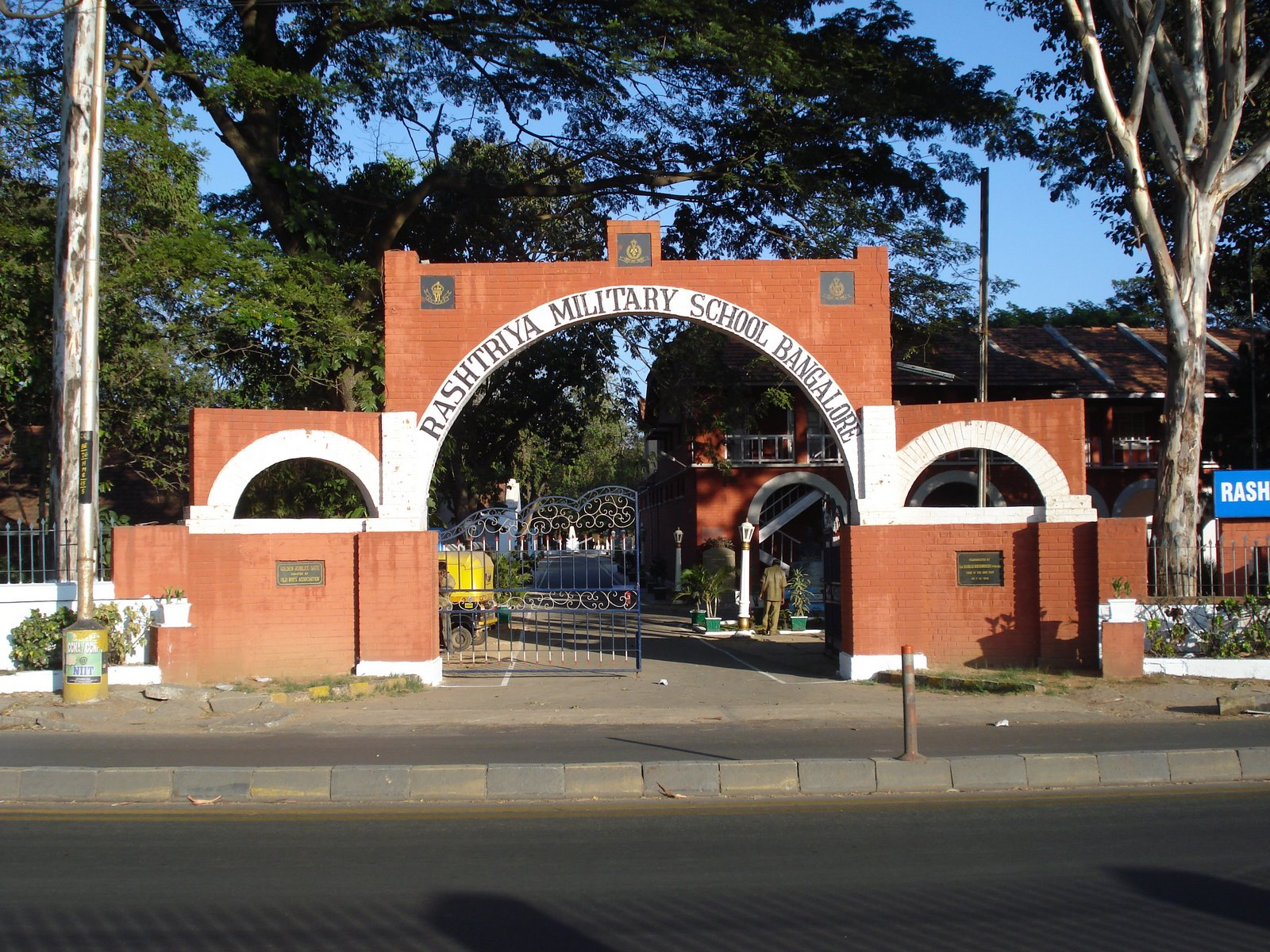
Main entrance

Bangalore Military School is one of the Rashtriya Military Schools (RMS). All RMS, under the direct control of Directorate General of Military Training (DGMT), are Category 'A' military training institutes at par with Rashtriya Indian Military College (RIMS) and National Defence Academy.

In 1946, Bangalore Military School was established under the name King George VI Royal Indian Military College, Bangalore (KGRIMC Bangalore) by taking a nucleus of 100 south Indian Boys, 50 from KGRIMC Jullundhar and 50 from KGRIMC Ajmer. During World War II, the site of present school was used as a convalescent home for British troops. Lt Col RHD Ross of the 8th Punjab Regiment, later transferred to RAEC was the first Commandant. In 1948, Lt Col Ross retired and left for UK. His place was taken by Maj TW King the first Indian Officer in Command. In Lt Col TW King's time civilian masters began to be appointed.

The primary aim of the RMS is to prepare students for the All India Senior Secondary School Certificate Examination of the Central Board of Secondary Education, New Delhi. The school also prepares boys who wish to join the Indian Armed Forces for the entrance examination of National Defence Academy. Boys between the age of 10–12 years are eligible for admission to school from Class VI onward. Alumni of the five RMS are known as Georgians after their founder father.

== Admissions ==
Admission to class VI

Students are not admitted directly to the school. Students aged in between 10-11 appear in CET for all military schools, followed by interviews and medical examinations to join the school according to merit list (the success rate is approximately 1% of the total applicants). Further details can be found on the website of Director General of Military Training (MT15).

Admission to class XI

Admission to class XI is based on marks secured in the X class.

Reservations

- 70% of seats are reserved for the wards of JCOs, OR in Army, Navy and Air Force including ex-servicemen. 20% of the seats are reserved for the wards of officers and 13% for the wards of civilians.
- 15% and 7.5% of the seats in each of these categories are reserved for SC and ST candidates.
- 10 seats in each Rashtriya Military School are reserved for wards of personnel killed in action.

== Sports and physical education ==
Facilities for the following games exist in the school:

- Hockey
- Basketball
- Volleyball
- Football
- Boxing
- Cricket
- Badminton
- Lawn Tennis
- Table Tennis
- Swimming
- Judo
- Athletics

The school has a gymnasium. Mountain bikes have been procured for adventure rides. The school has roller skates and the cadets are encouraged to participate in adventure activities organised by the school. The school has been recognized by Sports Authority of India (SAI) as a Nodal Centre for Boxing. Regular training in boxing is given by them in the Old Assembly Hall.

== Buildings and school area ==
Bangalore Military School is spread over 68 acres. New buildings include Cadets Mess, Assembly Hall, Six class rooms complex and residential accommodation for Administrative Officer, RMO and two Master Gazetted Officers.

The school swimming pool, closed for many years, was renovated and recommissioned in January 2004. A new building for accommodating all 340 cadets in a single complex was completed in December 2006, on the occasion of the Diamond Jubilee of the school. Accommodation for six Master Gazetted and six Assistant Masters were completed in 2007 and 2009 respectively. A new building incorporating Physics, Chemistry and Biology Labs was completed in October 2009. The Chemistry and Biology Lab buildings are being renovated for Computer and Language Laboratories.

== School memorial ==
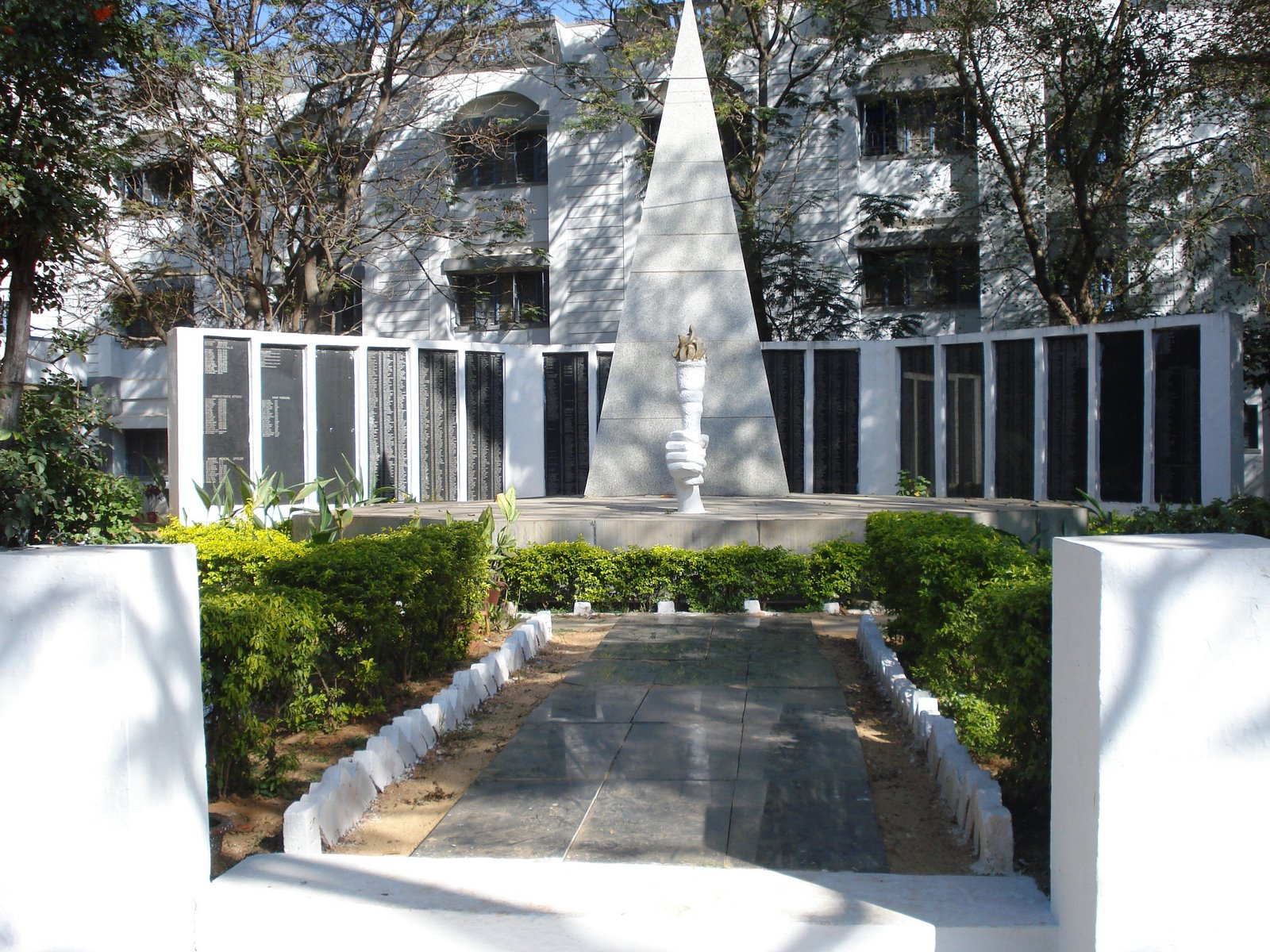
The school memorial

The school gives a distinct number to every cadet who earns admission here. A monument was built in 1998 under the patronage of the then Principal, Lt. Col. Charanjeet Singh Gill. The monument is the brainchild of the then Administrative Officer Lt.Col DPK Pillay who is an alumnus of the institute. On the memorial is inscribed every cadet's name along with their cadet number (unique roll number across batches). The monument was inaugurated by Major General RPRC Naidu who is again an alumnus of the school.

== Notable alumni ==
- Satishkumar Namdeo Ghormade [Vice Chief of Indian Naval Staff]
- D. P. K. Pillay, Indian Army officer
- Rajendran Christie, field hockey player
- Arun Sarin, Former Chief Executive Officer, Vodafone Group, plc
- Navin Nischol, actor
- Dino Morea, actor
- S. Jaishankar, External Affairs Minister of India

== See also ==
- National Cadet Corps (India) (NCC)
- National Police Cadet Corps (India) (NPCC)
- National Service Scheme (NSS)
- Rashtriya Indian Military College (RIMC)
- Sainik School
