= Ajmer Military School =

Coordinates: 26.4719°N 74.6485°E

Rashtriya Military School – Ajmer
- Ajmer; India

Information
- Type: Military school
- Motto: Sheelam Param Bhusanam
- Established: 15 Nov 1930; 95 years ago

Rashtriya Military School – Ajmer (formerly King George's Royal Indian Military School), established in 1930, is a boys' educational institution in Ajmer, Rajasthan, India.

The school was established in 1930 and is one of only five RMS (Rashtriya Military School, formerly called Royal Indian Military Schools) of its kind in India; the other four being Chail Military School founded in 1922, Belgaum Military School in 1945, Bangalore Military School in 1946 and Dholpur Military School in 1962. RIMC (established in 1922), RIMs and various Sainik Schools contribute 25% to 30% to various training academies of the Armed Forces. 1 RIMC and 5 RMS were established by the government after the World War I to Indianise the British Colonial Military in India by providing western style education with the aim to prepare the potential pool of future military officers.

Managed by the Indian Army, the institution offers education mainly to the wards of defence personnel but civilians are also offered admission.

The faculty includes, the "Academic Block, student hostels, teacher's residence, support staff residences, Mess, grounds, gymnasium, swimming pool, MI room, stores, and Dhobi Ghats. There is a very old Shiva Temple along with one prayer cum Pooja Hall."

Admission requirements are apparent as age, a common entrance test, provided documents and medical standards are required apart from the fees.

== See also ==
- History of Rashtriya Military Schools (RMS)
- National Cadet Corps (India) (NCC)
- National Service Scheme (NSS)
- Rashtriya Indian Military College (RIMC)
- Sainik School
