= Chail Military School =

Rashtriya Military School, Chail (National Military School, Chail)

Location
- Chail Shimla Hills, Himachal Pradesh; India; 30.9629°N 77.1985°E

Information
- Type: Military school
- Motto: Sheelam Param Bhushanam (Character is the Greatest Virtue)
- Established: 1925; 101 years ago
- School district: Solan
- Administrator: Major Kapil Salimath
- Principal: V. K. Gangwal Jain
- Staff: 100
- Faculty: 20
- Grades: Class 6-12
- Enrollment: 300
- Campus size: 174.80-acre (0.7074 km^{2})
- Campus type: Boarding school
- Colours: Light blue and dark blue
- Affiliation: CBSE
- Founder: King George V
- Houses: Nalanda, Taxila, Ujjain
- Nalanda: Red (new dorms and annexe)
- Taxila: Green (Sidh and Oak)
- Ujjain: Blue (Glen View)
- Website: www.rashtriyamilitaryschools.edu.in/rmschail/

Rashtriya Military School, Chail (also called Chail Military School; formerly King George Royal Indian Military College) (transl. National Military School, Chail) is a residential school in Himachal Pradesh, India. The school's origins lie with the establishment of King George's Royal Indian Military School in Jullunder (later Jalandhar), Punjab, soon after World War I, with a donation of ₹250,000 from King George V's patriotic fund. The foundation stone of this school was laid in the Jullunder Cantonment by King George V in February 1922, and the school started functioning in 1925. The school was moved to its present location in Chail, Himachal Pradesh, in 1960. Cadets are known as Georgians after the school's founding father.

It is one of only five RMS (Rashtriya Military Schools, formerly called Royal Indian Military Schools) and the oldest of its kind in Asia; the other four being Ajmer Military School founded in 1930, Belgaum Military School in 1945, Bangalore Military School in 1946 and Dholpur Military School in 1962. RIMC (established in 1922), Military Schools and various Sainik Schools contribute 25% to 30% to various training academies of the armed forces. 1 RIMC and 5 RMS were established by the government after World War I to Indianise the British Colonial Military in India by providing western style education with the aim to prepare the potential pool of future military officers.

The school is located amidst pine and deodar forests in the heart of the 110 km^{2} Chail Sanctuary at an altitude of 2,144 meters. A cricket ground, said to be the world's highest is located in Chail and is used as a training and playground for cadets.

== Centenary celebrations ==
In 2025, Rashtriya Military School, Chail marked its centenary year, completing 100 years since its establishment in 1925. The celebrations highlighted the institution's legacy in military-oriented education and leadership development.

As part of the commemorative events, a Centenary Gate was inaugurated and a special commemorative cover along with the first edition of The Centennial Chronicle was released. The Chief of the Army Staff General Upendra Dwivedi attended the principal ceremony as chief guest.

The school also unveiled the Bravehearts Memorial to honour alumni who laid down their lives in service to the nation.

Alumni organised a 242-kilometre ultra marathon from Jalandhar to Chail to commemorate the centenary year and celebrate the institution's historic journey.

== History ==
Chail Military School is the oldest military school in Asia. Similar schools were established at Ajmer in 1930, Belgaum in 1945, Bangalore in 1946, and Dholpur in 1962. After renaming, these 5 military schools are now collectively known as the "Rashtriya Military Schools" (RMS) and the cadets from these institutions call themselves Georgians, after King George V who founded the school.

=== British colonial origin ===
King George V (1865-1936) was the king of Great Britain and the emperor of India from 1910 to 1936. Though during World War I he had no direct responsibility, his duties took him to 450 military and naval installations, 300 military hospitals, and to several other places for personally distributing as many as 58,000 decorations. It was during these visits that King George V was so impressed with the courage and fighting abilities of the Indian troops that at the conclusion of the war, he decided to set up some institutions for the education of children of the Indian Jawans. Hence these schools were named "King George Royal Indian Military Colleges" (KGRIMC). Along with its sister KGRIMS institute now located in Jhelum, Pakistan, Chail Military School was named as King George Royal Indian Military School after King George V. After World War I, in February 1922 the foundation stone of the school was laid at Jalandhar Cantonment and regular classes were started in Punjab in September 1925 at Jalandhar Cantonment and the second campus at KGRIMS Jhelum (now in Pakistan). In 1930, the King George Royal Indian Military College of Ajmer was established. In 1945 when World War II came to an end, two more King George Royal Indian Military Colleges were started at Belgaum and Bangalore by King George VI.

The school was founded to provide free education to the sons of JCOs, NCOs and ORs to prepare them for Army examinations including the Indian Special Certificate of Education. The curriculum of the school was based on military requirements with English as a medium of instruction. The strength of the school was 250 and the staff consisted mostly of military personnel. In the beginning, the staff were entirely military personnel, with exception of office staff who were civilians. Initially, all instructors were officers, but they were gradually replaced by JCOs.

During the Second World War the school was designated as a college. One hundred more cadets were admitted under the expansion scheme. The eligibility norms were relaxed to facilitate enrollment of near relatives of Army personnel and admissions were thrown open to all branches of the armed forces. At that time, Jalandhar and Jhelum military colleges were affiliated with the Panjab University for matriculation and intermediate examinations. The institution produced a large number of officers. During World War II the cadets of these institutions were granted an emergency commission and subsequently, permission was granted for entry of the Cadets to the Armed Forces looking to the training they received at these institutions.

=== Reorganisation after independence of India ===
Until 1952, Regimental Centres sponsored the sons of JCOs/ORs for admission to KGRIMCs. The aim then was to give education up to Army Special Classes and then make them VCOs. Some of them were also commissioned as officers.

On 26 January 1950, these KGIMS were renamed the "King George’s Military College" (KGMC).

In July 1952, these were renamed the "King George’s School" (KGS). On the recommendations of a committee headed by educationist Dr. Hridaya Nath Kunzru, KGS was reorganized as residential public schools, and admissions were thrown open to the sons of Service Officers as well as Civilians. This brought the schools within the reach of the middle class for the first time. Instead of the Army Exams, the students switched over to the Senior Cambridge Certificate Examination, and the condition that all students should join the military services were dropped. The motto then was "Play The Game".

On 1 July 1960, the King George’s School Nowgong, which was earlier moved from Jalandhar to Kitchner College in Nowgong in 1952, was relocated to its current location in Chail in Himachal Pradesh.

In 1962, the fifth KGS school was started at Dholpur in Rajasthan.

In 1963, the affiliation of KGS to the University of Cambridge was replaced by the Higher Secondary School Examination conducted by Central board of secondary education (CBSE) Delhi.

On 1 January 1966, the KGS was renamed the "Military School" with the "xyz Military School" nomenclature, e.g. "Chail Military School". On reorganization, public school education was, for the first time, brought within the reach of the middle class. Admission was thrown open to sons of service officers and civilians as well. The motto of the schools was changed to "Sheelam Param Bhushanam" which translates to "Character is the Greatest Virtue".

In January 1998, the nomenclature changed again when the location prefix "xyz" was dropped, and the KGS was re-designated "Military School, xyz", e.g. "Military School, Chail".

=== Present status ===
In 2007, to reflect the 'All India' outlook of the school the Chail Military School along with its sister institutes Bangalore Military School (Karnataka), Belgaum Military School (Karnataka), Ajmer Military School (Rajasthan) and Dholpur Military School (Rajasthan) were renamed as the "Rashtriya Military Schools (RMS)" of India.

All RMS is Category 'A' military training institutes at par with Rashtriya Indian Military College and National Defence Academy. All RMS are under the direct control of the Army's Directorate General of Military Training (DGMT) at IHQ of Ministry of Defence (MoD), and the instructions pertaining to finance, training, admission and recruitment are received directly from Army Head Quarters (AHQ). In 2019, it was decided to merge the DGMT with Army Training Command (ARTRAC). The Central Governing Council (CGC), headed by the Defence Secretary, is the apex body for the school. RMS prepare boys from the age of 10 to 18 years for the All India Secondary School Examination and All India Senior School Certificate Examination, New Delhi and also for the Entrance Examination to the National Defence Academy.

Cadets of RMS institutions have risen to the rank of Generals, Air marshals, and Admirals, Secretaries to the government of India and to top positions in the police and Paramilitary forces. Many have established industries and reached international level recognition in their fields and also hold high positions in companies. Many cadets are Ministers and Members of Parliament, surgeons, and scientists.

== Admissions ==
=== Admission to class VI ===
- Students are not admitted directly to the school. Students aged between 10-11 appear in CET for all military schools, followed by interviews and medical examinations to join the school according to the merit list (the success rate is approximately 1% of the total applicant). For further details see Director-General of Military training (MT15) website
- Admission to class IX is through a Common Entrance Test, which is conducted by the Rashtriya Military School Chail.
- Admission to class XI is based on marks secured in the X class.

=== Reservations ===
- 70% of seats are reserved for the wards of JCOs, OR in Army, Navy, and Air Force including ex-servicemen. 30% of the seats are reserved for the wards of officers and for the wards of civilians.
- 15% and 7.5% of the seats in each of these categories are reserved for SC and ST candidates.
- 10 seats in each Rashtriya Military School are reserved for wards of personnel killed in action.

== Life at campus ==
=== Academics ===
The school is affiliated with the CBSE board of India. Unit tests are held quarterly in addition to half-yearly and annual examinations. Students appear for AISSCE (10th) and AISSE (12th) along with other CBSE affiliated schools in India. Student to staff ratio is about 2.5:1 and student to teaching staff ratio is 10:1. Students are offered Science subjects in 11th and 12th classes. The School curriculum includes seven periods of 40 minutes each. Daily three hours of compulsory prep is included in a routine for students to concentrate on their studies. Students undergo exams as per the CBSE guidelines.

=== Subdivisions/Houses ===
- Taxila House (Sidh and Oak Cottage): Cadets from this house are known as Tigers.
- Nalanda House (New Dorms and Annexe) Cadets from this house are known as Fireballs.
- Ujjain House (Glen View) Cadets from this house are known as Dynamites(Champion Of Champions House).

=== Co-Curricular Activities (CCA) ===
CCA is a part of the school curriculum. Cadets participate in debates, declamations, quizzes, extempore, dance, theatre, and poetry recitation in English and Hindi. They also participate in inter-house and inter-school arts competitions. The school team is a participant in national and state-level CCA meets. Chail Gurudwara and Sidh temple are also actively administered by the school.

=== Sports and physical education ===
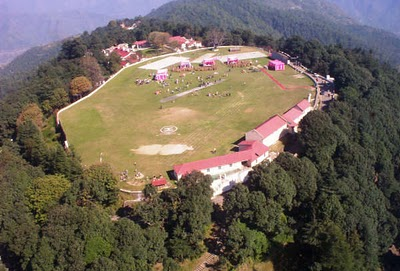
Cricket ground

Cadets undergo compulsory physical training in the morning and play sports in the evening. The school has facilities for cricket, basketball, volleyball, athletics, cross-country, and boxing. The school is a member of the Indian Public Schools' Conference (IPSC) and participates in the state as well as national level sports competitions. The Inter Military Schools Pentangular meet is an annual sports and CCA event where all five military schools (and previously Rashtriya Indian Military College Dehradun) compete in several fields.

== Commandants and principals ==
Commandants	Years
Lt. AL Hadden	1925–1928
Capt. HE Sharpe	1928–1932
Capt. THL Stebbing	1932–1936
Capt. JH Bell	1936–1939
Maj. WS Beddal	1939–1944
Lt Col RCF Caulifield	1944–1947
Lt Col F Mitchell	1947
Maj N L Gujral	1947–1948
Maj R Som Dutt	1948–1949
Maj F S Shergill	1949–1952
Shri Din Dayal	1952–1954
Shri PD Gadre	1954–1960
Maj S Mazumdar	1960–1961
Cdr BS Ranjit	1961–1963
Maj SS Nakra	1963–1964
Lt Col SS Nakra	1964–1967
Lt Col Randhir Singh	1967–1968
Lt Col Ramji Chugh	1968–1973
Maj JC Kohli	1973–1976
Shri UK Chaturvedi	1976–1983
Maj BN Arjunan	1983–1984
Maj MPS Tyagi	1984–1985
Shri L William	1985–1986
Shri KK Arora	1986–1988
Lt Col TS Aulakh	1988–1990
Shri RC Chopra	1990–1992
Dr SN Pandey	1992–1993
Lt Col AK Maini	1993–1996
Maj Vijai Singh	1996–1999
Shri TS Panwar	1999–2001
Maj Kamal Padha	2001–2003
Lt Col Raju Peter	2003–2006
Lt Col. V Ravindra Kumar	2006–2008
Lt Col. VK Bhat	2008–2011
Lt Col. Arun M Kulkarni	2011-2014
Lt Col. Vineet Ohri	2014-2017
Lt Col. SPS Chauhan	2017-2020
Shri V K Gangwal Jain	2022-

== Centenary Batch of RMS Chail ==
The school celebrated its centenary year in 2025 with events including alumni gatherings, memorial dedications, and commemorative ceremonies

== Alumni ==
=== Chail Military School in Siachen ===
Cadets from the school have reached the world's highest battlefield 'Siachen Glacier'. The team consisted of four cadets each from the Rashtriya Indian Military College (RIMC) and the Chail Military School, two cadets from the Indian Military Academy, six cadets - including four girls - from the National Cadet Corps, four civilians, including the wife of an army officer, four officers, 15 personnel below officer rank and seven media persons.

=== Notable alumni ===
The school has produced several Generals (Lt Gen and Maj Gen), Brigadiers, and thousands of Colonels and Lt Colonels along with Governors, Ministers, Civil servants and paramilitary officers(CAPFs). Many Students have joined elite government services like Indian Foreign Service and Indian Administrative Service.

- Captain Gurbachan Singh Salaria, awarded the Param Vir Chakra, India's highest wartime military award. India's only Param Vir Chakra awardee for a United Nations mission, is a distinguished alumnus of Rashtriya Military School, Chail. First Param Vir Chakra won by an NDA alumni.
- Brigadier Rai Singh Yadav, MVC, Commanding officer of Indian Army during Nathu La and Cho La clashes 1967
- Maj Gen Siri Kanth Korla, PVSM, DSO, MC - highly decorated veteran of World War II and the 1965 Indo-Pakistan War.

=== Georgian Association North ===
All students and their family members are the part of the extended Georgian family. President of the Georgian Association (North) is Sh Vipin Pubby who was elected on 13 April 2018 at Chandigarh. The Official address of the Georgian Asscn North is : First Floor, House No. 1538, Sector :33-D, Chandigarh- 160020 (UT)

== See also ==
- National Cadet Corps (India) (NCC)
- National Police Cadet Corps (India) (NPCC)
- National Service Scheme (NSS)
- Rashtriya Indian Military College (RIMC)
- Sainik School
