= Gurbachan Singh Salaria =

Indian Army officer and member of a United Nations peacekeeping force

Captain Gurbachan Singh Salaria PVC
- Born: 29 November 1935; Shakargarh, Punjab, British India
- Died: 5 December 1961 (aged 26); Élisabethville, State of Katanga
- Education: King George's Royal Indian Military College in Bangalore; King George's Royal Indian Military College in Jalandhar; National Defence Academy
- Military career
- Allegiance: Republic of India
- Branch: Indian Army
- Service years: 1957–1961
- Rank: Captain
- Service number: IC-8497
- Unit: 3/1 Gorkha Rifles
- Conflicts: Congo Crisis; United Nations intervention; Operation Unokat †
- Awards: Param Vir Chakra

Captain Gurbachan Singh Salaria, PVC (29 November 1935 – 5 December 1961) was an Indian military officer and member of a United Nations peacekeeping force. Salaria was an alumnus of the King George's Royal Indian Military Colleges in Bangalore and in Jalandhar as well as the National Defence Academy (NDA). He was the first NDA alumnus and is the only UN Peacekeeper to be awarded a Param Vir Chakra (PVC), India's highest wartime military decoration.

In December 1961, Salaria was among the Indian troops deployed to the Republic of the Congo as part of the United Nations Operation in the Congo. On 5 December, as part of Operation Unokat, Salaria's battalion was tasked to clear a roadblock of two armoured cars manned by 150 gendarmes of the secessionist State of Katanga on the way to the Elizabethville Airport. The plan was that Salaria and his men were to block their retreat. His rocket launcher team attacked and destroyed the Katangese armoured cars. This unforeseen move confused the Katangese gendarmes, and Salaria felt it would be best to attack before they reorganised. Though his troops were outnumbered, they charged towards the Katangese and killed 40 men in a kukri assault. During the attack, Salaria was shot twice in the neck and eventually succumbed to his injuries. The remaining gendarmes fled in confusion, leaving their dead and wounded behind. This helped the main battalion to easily overrun the Katangese and clear the roadblock. For his duty and courage, and disregard for his own safety during the battle, Salaria was awarded the PVC.

== Early life and education ==
Gurbachan Singh Salaria was born on 29 November 1935, in Jamwal, a village near Shakargarh, Punjab, British India (now in Pakistan). He was the second of five children of Munshi Ram and Dhan Devi. His father had earlier been drafted into the Dogra Squadron of the Hodson's Horse regiment in the British Indian Army. Listening to tales of his father and his regiment motivated Salaria to join the army at a very young age.

As a result of the partition of India, Salaria's family moved to the Indian part of Punjab and settled in Jangal village in Gurdaspur district. Salaria enrolled in the local village school. He was not very attentive to his studies and spent much of his time playing kabaddi. In July 1946 he applied for admission into the King George's Royal Indian Military College in Bangalore. Though he passed the entrance exam, he failed the medical exam because his chest was too small. Salaria spent the following weeks exercising and when he applied again in August he met the requirements and was admitted into the college. In August 1947, he was transferred to the KGRIMC in Jalandhar. After passing out from KGRIMC, he joined the Joint Services Wing of the National Defence Academy (NDA). On graduating from the NDA in 1956, he enrolled in the Indian Military Academy, completing his studies on 9 June 1957, when he was commissioned a second lieutenant. Salaria was initially commissioned into the 2nd battalion, 3 Gorkha Rifles, but was later transferred to the 3rd battalion, 1 Gorkha Rifles in March 1960, following his promotion to lieutenant on 9 June 1959.

== Congo Crisis ==
In June 1960, the Republic of the Congo became independent from Belgium. But during the first week of July, a mutiny broke out in the Congolese Army and violence erupted between black and white civilians. Belgium sent troops to protect fleeing whites and two areas of the country, Katanga and South Kasai, subsequently seceded with Belgian support. The Congolese government asked the United Nations (UN) for help, and on 14 July 1960, the organisation responded by establishing the United Nations Operation in the Congo, a large multi-national peacekeeping force and aid mission. Between March–June 1961, under the command of Brigadier K.A.S. Raja, India contributed the 99th Infantry Brigade, around 3,000 men, to the UN force.

After attempts at reconciliation between the Congolese government and Katanga failed, on 24 November, the UN Security Council approved UN Security Council Resolution 169. (Note: United Nations Security Council Resolution 169, adopted on 24 November 1961.) The resolution condemned Katanga's secession and authorised the use of force to immediately resolve the conflict and establish peace in the region. In response, the Katangese Gendarmerie took two senior UN officials hostage. They were later released, but Major Ajit Singh of the 1 Gorkha Rifles was also captured and eventually killed, as was his driver. Roadblocks were erected by the gendarmes to prevent communication between the UN detachments and isolating them from each other, making it easier to take down the detachments one by one. On 4 December a block was established on the road between the city of Élisabethville and the nearby airport. UN troops reacted by initiating Operation Unokat to defend their positions and reestablish their freedom of movement in the region.

=== Operation Unokat ===
On 5 December 1961, the 3rd battalion, 1 Gorkha Rifles was tasked to clear the roadblock on the way to Élizabethville Airport at a strategic roundabout. The roadblock was held by 150 gendarmes (Note: As per Chakravorty, there were 90 gendarmes.) with two armoured cars. The plan was for the first attack to be made by Charlie Company, led by Major Govind Sharma. Captain Salaria, with a platoon from Alpha Company close to the airport road, (Note: Some sources claim that Captain Salaria was leading 16 men, while some claim 26.) was to block the gendarmes' retreat, and to attack them if required. The rest of Alpha Company was kept in reserve. The plan was to be executed at midday.

Captain Salaria and his troops reached the specified location with their armoured personnel carriers. They were positioned around 1,500 yards (1,400 m) from the Katangese roadblock. His rocket launcher team was soon able to get close enough to the gendarmes' armoured cars to destroy them. This unforeseen move left the Katangese confused and disorganised. Contrary to the prior plan of Charlie Company making the first attack, Salaria felt that it was prudent to attack before the gendarmes reorganised.

Though his troops were heavily outnumbered by the gendarmes, he charged towards them, engaging in a hand-to-hand kukri assault whilst shouting the Gorkha war cry, "Ayo Gorkhali" (English: The Gorkhas have arrived). Salaria and his men killed 40 gendarmes, but he was shot twice in the neck by automatic gunfire. He collapsed due to blood loss at the last line of trenches. His second-in-command was ordered to evacuate him in an armoured personnel carrier to the airport hospital as soon as possible. Regardless, Salaria succumbed to his injuries.

The close engagement with the Indian troops resulted in the gendarmerie losing about half their men; they fled in confusion, leaving their dead and the injured behind. This enabled the main battalion to easily overrun the Katangese force, clear the roadblock, and prevent the gendarmes from encircling the UN Headquarters in Élisabethville. For his duty and courage, and disregard for his own safety, Salaria was awarded the Param Vir Chakra.

=== Param Vir Chakra ===
For his actions on 5 December 1961, Salaria was awarded the Param Vir Chakra. The citation read:

On 5 December 1961, 3/1 Gorkha Rifles was ordered to clear a roadblock established by the gendarmerie at a strategic roundabout at Elizabethville, Katanga. The plan was that one company with 2 Swedish armoured cars would attack the position frontally and Captain Gurbachan Singh Salaria with two sections of Gorkhas and two Swedish armoured personnel carriers would advance towards this roadblock from the airfield to act as a cutting-off force. Captain Salaria with his small force arrived at a distance of 1500 yards from the roadblock at approximately 1312 hours on 5 December 1961 and came under heavy automatic and small-arms fire from an undetected enemy position dug in on his right flank. The enemy also had two armoured cars and about 90 men opposing Captain Salaria’s small force. Captain Salaria appreciating that he had run into a subsidiary roadblock and ambush and that this enemy force might reinforce the strategic roundabout and thus jeopardise the main operation, decided to remove this opposition. He led a charge with bayonets, khukris, and grenades supported by a rocket launcher. In this gallant engagement, Captain Salaria killed 40 of the enemy and knocked out the two armoured cars. This unexpected bold action completely demoralised the enemy who fled despite their numerical superiority and protected positions. Captain Salaria was wounded in his neck by a burst of automatic fire but continued to fight till he collapsed due to profuse bleeding. Captain Salaria’s gallant action prevented any enemy movement of the enemy force towards the main battle scene and thus contributed very largely to the success of the main battalion’s action at the roundabout and prevented the encirclement of UN Headquarters in Elizabethville. Captain Salaria subsequently died of his wounds.

— Gazette of India No.8—Press/62, (Cardozo 2003, pp. 185–186)

Salaria was the first graduate of NDA to win a PVC, and, as of 2017, also the only UN Peacekeeper to be awarded a PVC.

== Honours and decorations ==

| Param Vir Chakra | Videsh Seva Medal | ONUC |

== Other honours ==
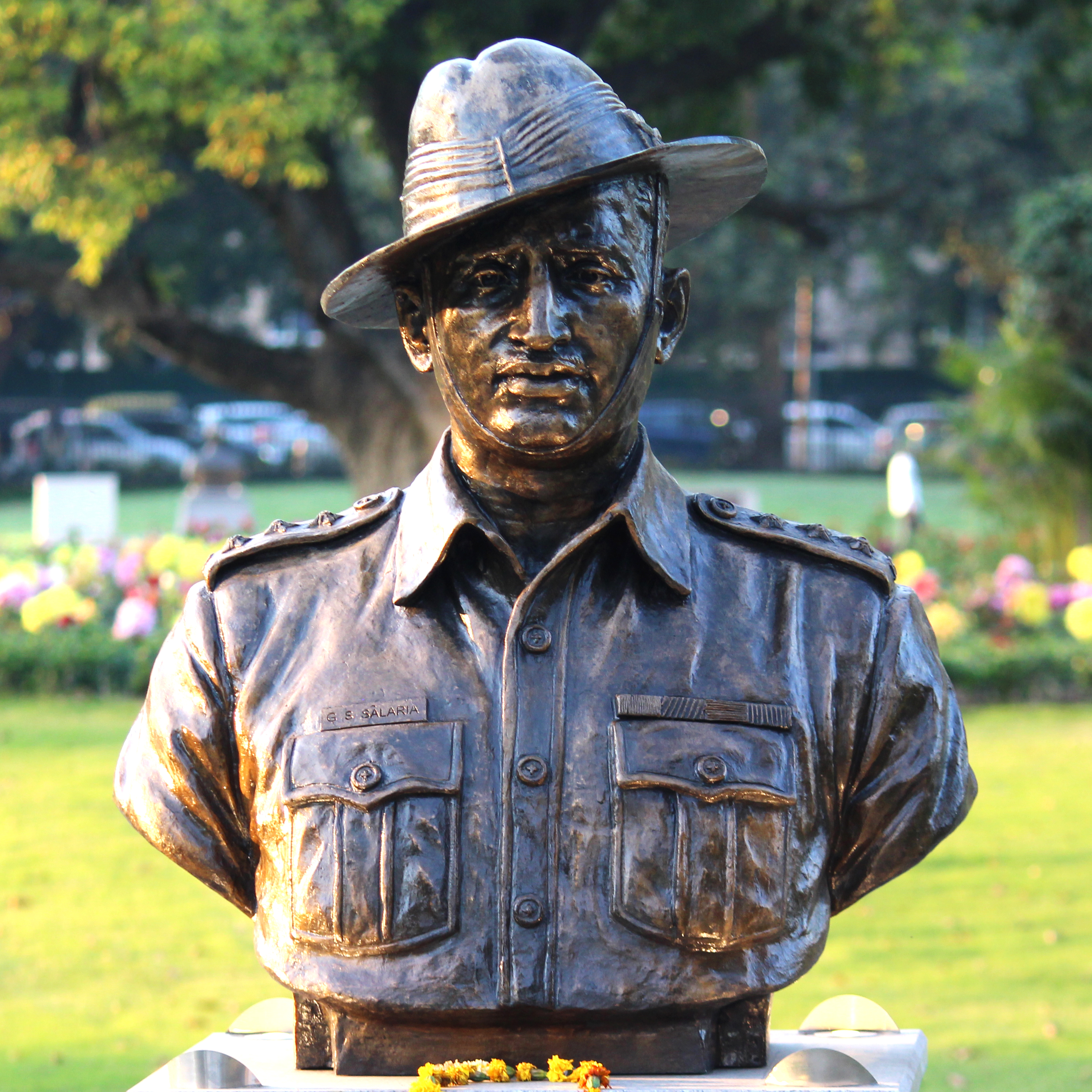
G. S. Salaria's statue at Param Yodha Sthal, National War Memorial, New Delhi

In the 1980s, the Shipping Corporation of India (SCI), a Government of India enterprise under the aegis of the Ministry of Shipping, named fifteen of its crude oil tankers in honour of the PVC recipients. The tanker MT Capt. Gurbachan Singh Salaria, PVC was delivered to SCI on 26 October 1984, and served for 25 years before being phased out. During an October 2017 episode of the radio programme Mann Ki Baat about Indian contribution to international peacekeeping, Prime Minister of India Narendra Modi said,

Who can forget the sacrifice of Captain Gurbachan Singh Salaria who laid down his life while fighting in Congo in Africa? Every Indian feels proud while remembering him.

In September 2019, India's Chief of the Army Staff, Bipin Rawat, met members of Salaria's family to express his gratitude for his service on behalf of the army and the country.

A road leading to 14 Gorkha Training Centre, Subathu, Solan Himachal Pradesh named “Paramveer Marg” after him, which was inaugurated by Naik Gopal Singh Thapa (Retd), 3/1 Gorkha Rifles, who was then member of the Gallant Force of Capt GS Salaria, PVC (posthumous).

== Notes ==
Footnotes

Citations
