= Chail Cricket Ground =

Cricket ground in Himachal Pradesh, India

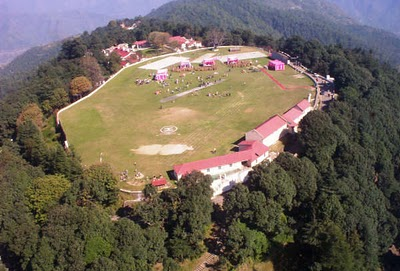
- Interactive map of Chail Cricket Ground

Ground information
- Location: Chail, Himachal Pradesh
- Country: India
- Establishment: 1891

Team information
Himachal Pradesh	(1990–1991)
- As of 31 August, 2015

Chail Cricket Ground is a cricket ground located in Chail, Himachal Pradesh. The ground was established in 1893 by Rajinder Singh, Maharaja of Patiala who owned a summer-retreat in Chail, the time the ground was developed. The ground is located at 2444 meters above sea level which makes it the highest cricket ground in the world. The ground is surrounded by forest and is used as the school playground by Chail Military School. During school vacations it is also used for polo. There is a well maintained basketball court, as well as goal posts for football.
