= Mahog =

Mahog Mahog
- village
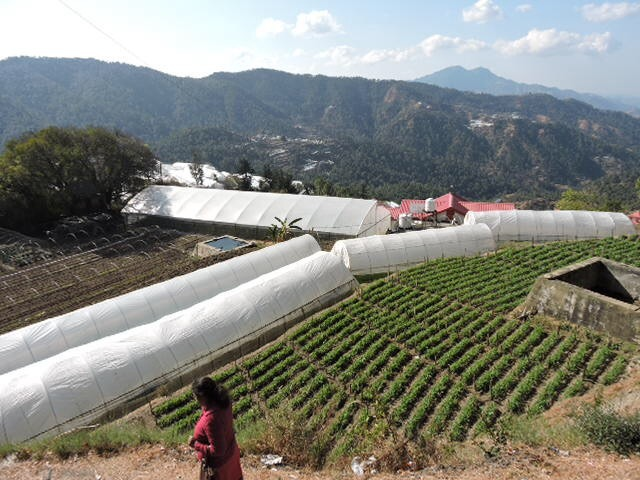
- Polyhouse Floriculture in village Mahog

- Location in Himachal Pradesh, India Mahog (India)
- Coordinates: 30.954060°N 77.210189°E
- Country: India
- State: Himachal Pradesh
- District: Solan

Government
  - Body: Panchayat

Languages
  - Official: Hindi
  - Native: Mahasui (Baghati); (Keonthali)
- Time zone: UTC+5:30 (IST)
- Nearest town: Chail
- Civic agency: Panchayat

Mahog is a tiny village in the Solan district of Himachal Pradesh, India. It has a population of around 50. It is around five kilometers from Chail on the Kandaghat road. The village is known for its floriculture, with many hi-tech floriculture polyhouse farms located in the village.

== Gallery ==
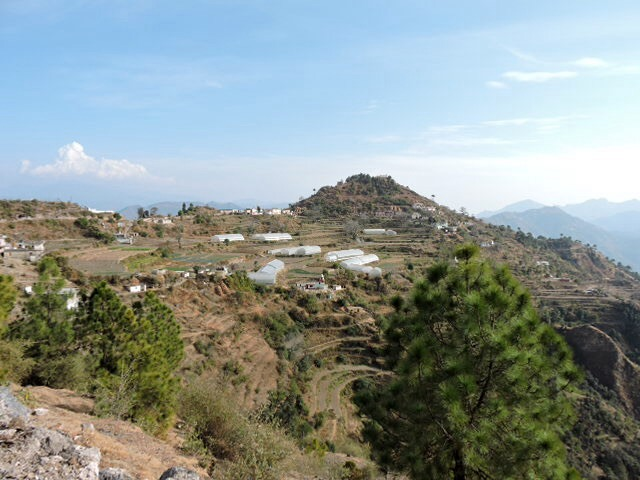
Village Mahog

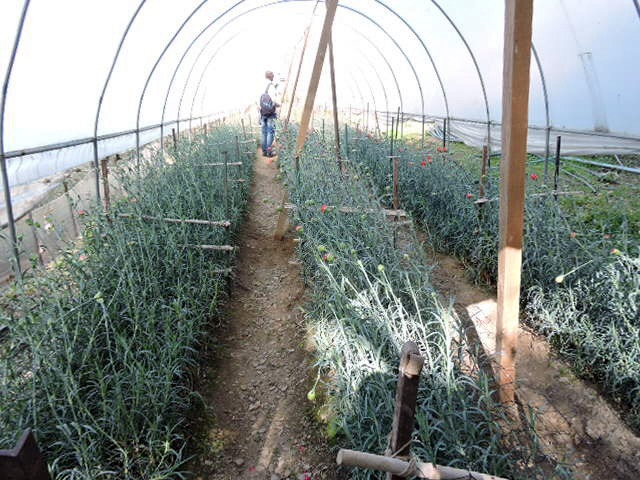
Polyhouse floriculture in village Mahog

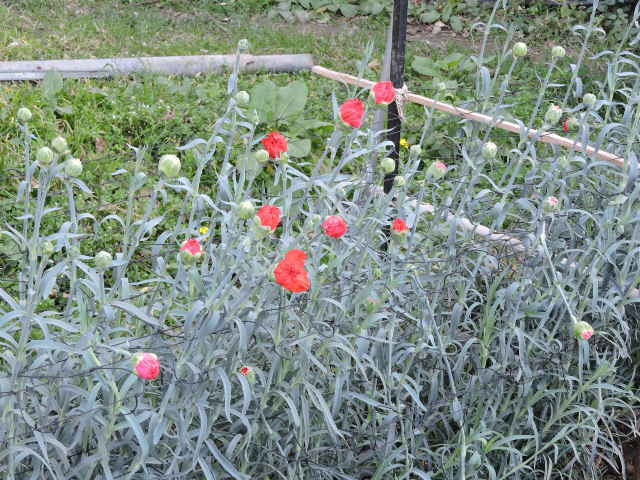
Polyhouse floriculture in village Mahog

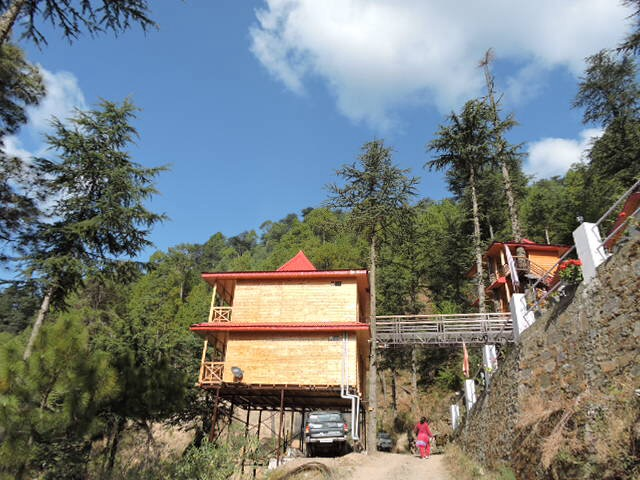
Village Inn cottage in Mahog

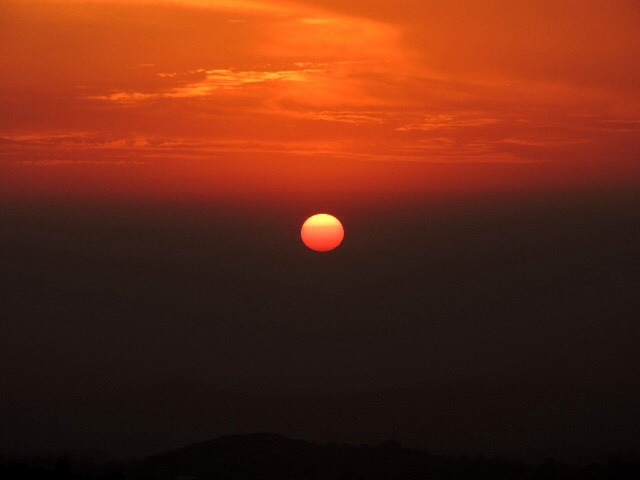
Sunset view at village Mahog

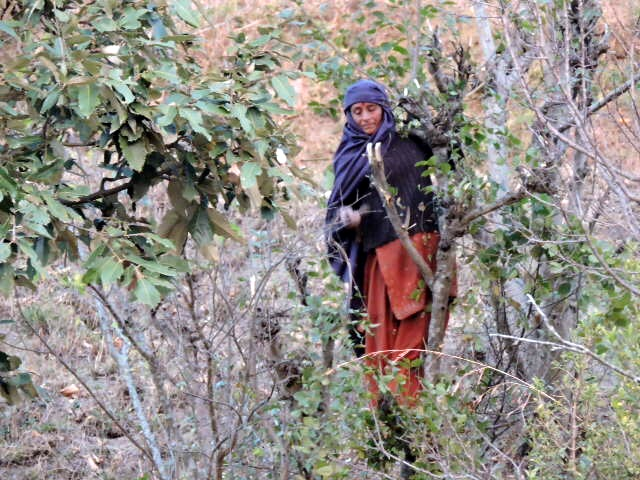
A Pahadi Woman Pruning fruit tree at Mahog village
