= Sadhupul =

- Village
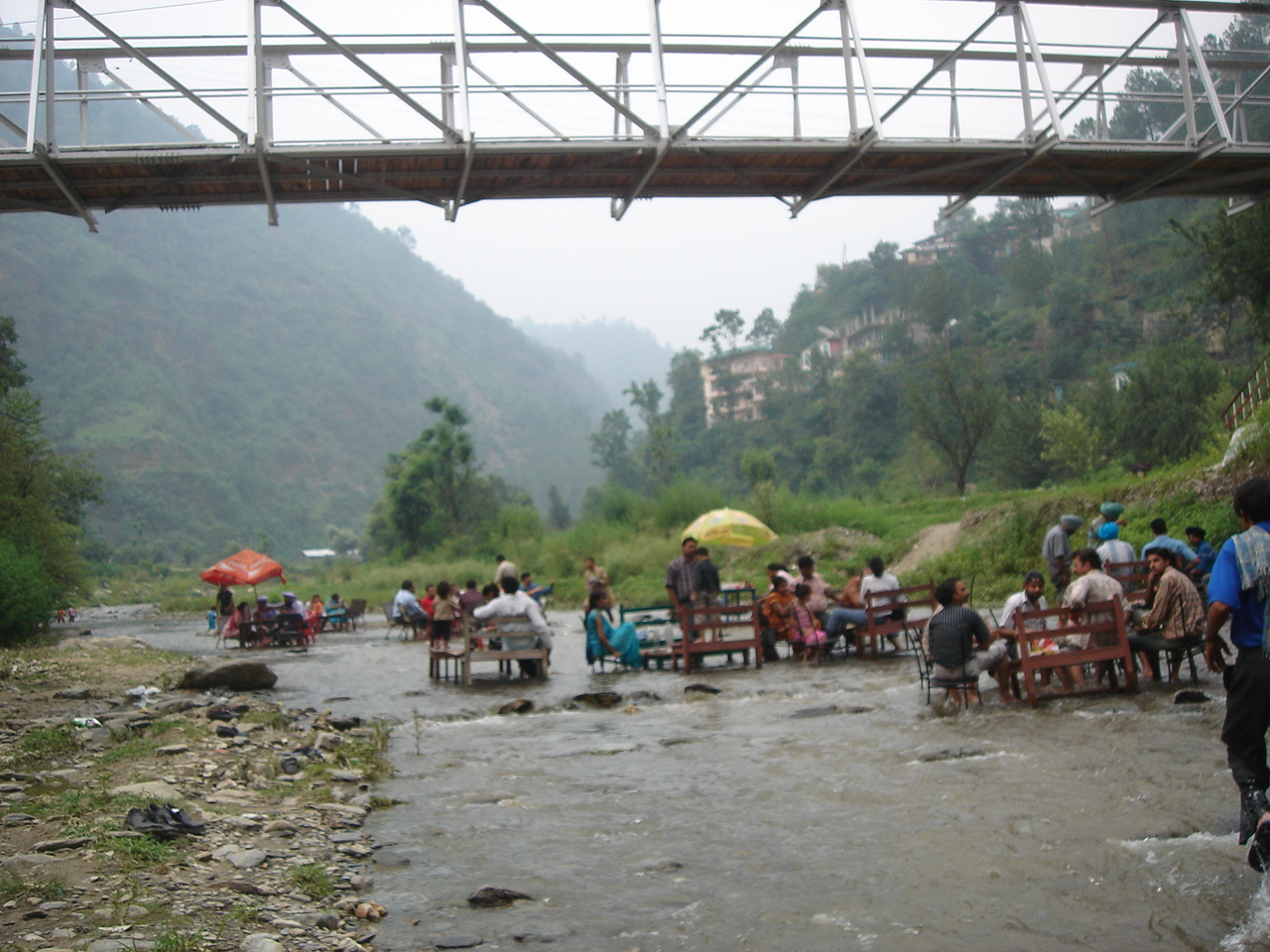
- The bridge at Sadhupul

- Location in Himachal Pradesh, India Sadhupul (India)
- Coordinates: 30.994477°N 77.1599811°E
- Country: India
- State: Himachal Pradesh
- District: Solan

Languages
  - Official: Hindi
  - Native: Mahasui (Baghati)
- Time zone: UTC+5:30 (IST)
- Nearest city: Solan

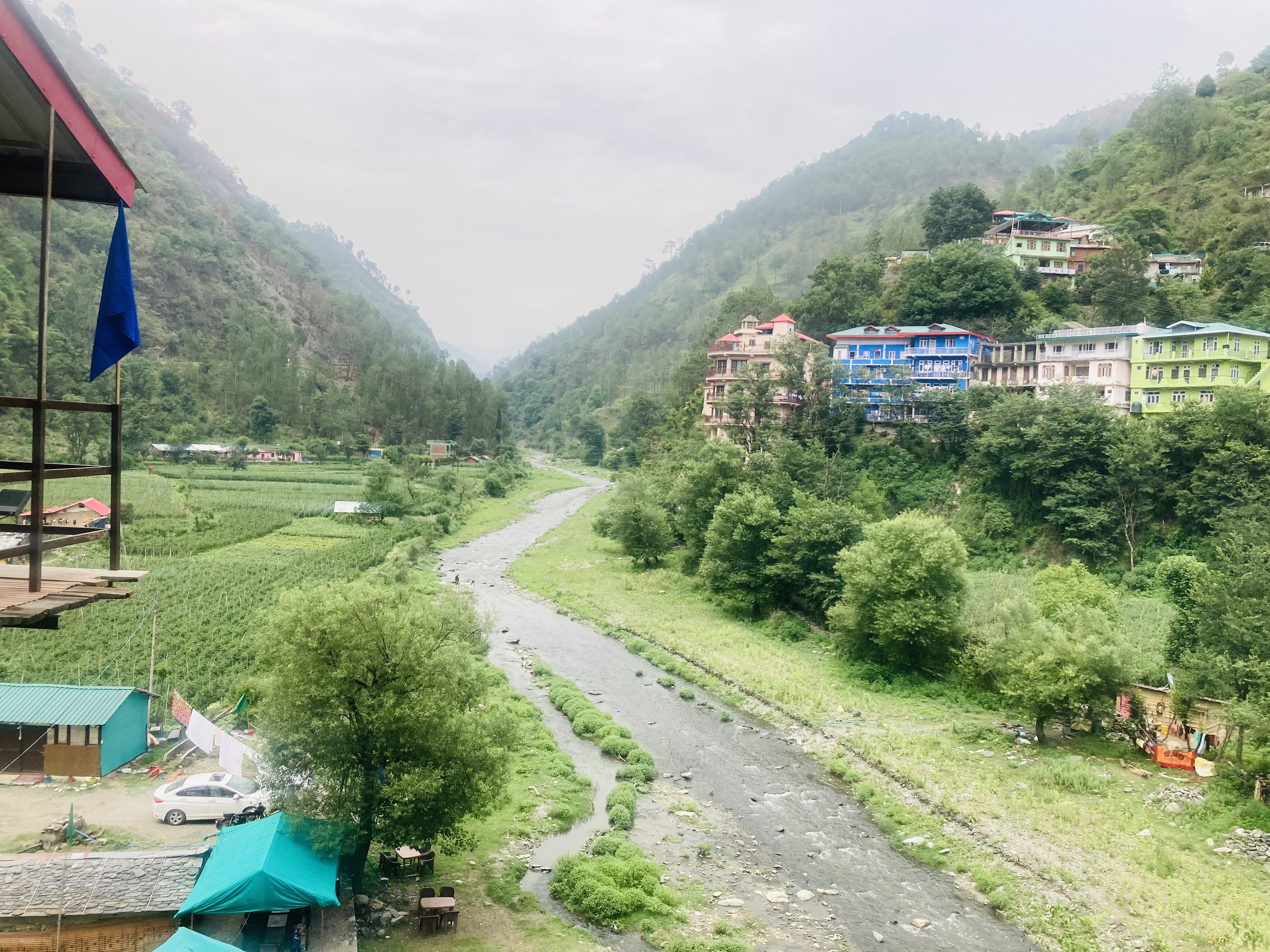
Sadhupul near Chail

Sadhupul is a small village in (dhalta) Himachal Pradesh between Solan and Chail, located at the site of a small bridge constructed over the hill river "Ashwini". On 23 August 2014 this bridge collapsed, when an overloaded truck tried to cross it. A New bridge has been constructed and dedicated to people in January 2018.

== Water Park Cafe ==
A water park was inaugurated on 30 June 2017 by CM.
