= Longdi pabram =

Longdi Pabram
- Village
- Coordinates: 25.0714°N 93.495°E
- Country: India
- State: Manipur

Longdi pabram is a village in Tamenglong district of Manipur state of India. It has a long history of being affected by insurgency. The village has been in national news in recent years for the efforts of an Indian Army officer, DPK Pillay, who has brought development and relief works at the doorsteps of the village.
