= B. S. Moonje =

Leader of the Hindu Mahasabha

Balakrishna Shivram Moonje (B.S. Moonje, also B.S. Munje, 12 December 1872 – 3 March 1948) was a leader of the Hindu Mahasabha in India.

== Career ==
Moonje was born into a Deshastha Rigvedi Brahmin (DRB) family in 1872 at Bilaspur in Central Provinces. He completed his Medical Degree from Grant Medical College in Mumbai in 1898, and was employed in Bombay Municipal Corporation as a Medical Officer.

Following the death of Bal Gangadhar Tilak in 1920, Moonje dissociated from Congress. He disagreed with the two main policies of M. K. Gandhi, namely his non-violence and secularism. His association with Hindu Mahasabha increased and he was also political mentor of Hedgewar who founded RSS in 1925.

Moonje was the All India President of the Hindu Mahasabha from 1927 until he handed over the charge to Vinayak Damodar Savarkar in 1937. Until his death, he was active in the Mahasabha and toured all over India. Savarkar had his strong support. He also attended the Round Table Conferences (in London) twice, despite strong opposition from Congress leaders on his views.

=== Trip to Italy ===
During March 15 to 24, 1931, Moonje travelled to Italy, where he met with Prime Minister Benito Mussolini and was shown the militarisation of society through a guided tour of organisations such as Balilla, the Accademia della Farnesina and other military schools and educational institutions. He visited the Italian Fascist youth organisation the Opera Nazionale Balilla, which he praised.

The Balilla institutions and the conception of the whole organisation have appealed to me most, though there is still not discipline and organisation of high order. The whole idea is conceived by Mussolini for the military regeneration of Italy. Italians, by nature, appear ease-loving and non-martial like the Indians generally. They have cultivated, like Indians, the work of peace and neglected the cultivation of the art of war. Mussolini saw the essential weakness of his country and conceived the idea of the Balilla organisation. Nothing better could have been conceived for the military organisation of Italy. The idea of fascism vividly brings out the conception of unity amongst people. India and particularly Hindu India need some such institution for the military regeneration of the Hindus.

— B. S. Moonje, Diary entry,

Moonje was deeply influenced by these fascist organisations, in which he saw an opportunity to militarise Hindu society in order to fight against both internal and external threats. After returning from his Italy visit, he set up Bhonsala Military School in Nasik. The Rashtriya Swayamsevak Sangh (RSS) later appropriated this model on a larger scale, and there is an uncanny similarity between the RSS and Balilla in terms of recruitment and organisational setup.

Moonje remained in constant contact with the fascist supporter Giuseppe Tucci through letters. Moonje died on 3 March 1948, aged 75.

== Bibliography ==
- Bapu, Prabhu (2013). Hindu Mahasabha in Colonial North India, 1915–1930: Construction Nation and History. Routledge. ISBN 978-0-415-67165-1.
- Casolari, Marzia (27 July 2020). In the Shadow of the Swastika: The Relationships Between Indian Radical Nationalism, Italian Fascism and Nazism. doi:10.4324/9781003051442. ISBN 9781003051442. S2CID 225358839.
- Jaffrelot, Christophe (1996). The Hindu Nationalist Movement and Indian Politics. C. Hurst & Co. Publishers. ISBN 978-1-85065-301-1.
