= Chail Gurudwara =

Gurdwara in Himachal Pradesh, India

The Chail Gurudwara is a Sikh temple which was established at Chail in 1907. It was constructed by Maharaja Bhupinder Singh of Patiala. After partition of Punjab, the building was taken over by the government of Himachal Pradesh. Since then, the Department of Art & Culture started looking after the Gurudwara affairs.

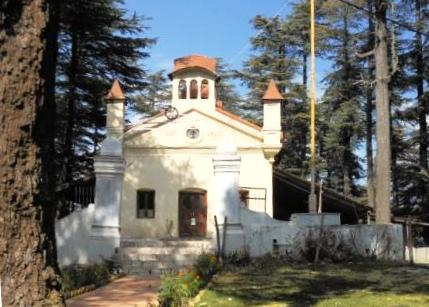
Gurudwara Sahib

== Chail Heritage Foundation ==
Chail Heritage Foundation, an NGO formed by ex-students of Chail Military School, took up the challenge and started renovating the building. The first phase of the renovation was completed before the centenary and the refurbished Gurudwara was inaugurated on Guru Nanak Devji's Gurupurab in 2007. The original architecture of the building that resembles a church has been preserved.

== Management ==
Chail Gurudwara is currently managed by the Government of Himachal Pradesh. Being located in a small place, the Gurudwara sees very few devotees. However, local people, tourists and Military School cadets are the regular visitors to the Gurudwara. A Gurudwara Management Committee is officially formed with Georgian Association (Chandigarh) as a local contact, and is looking after the affairs of the Gurudwara. The committee works in close co-operation with SGPC and Himachal Pradesh Government. MLA Ravi Thakur, a Georgian, is taking special interest in the Gurudwara Management. A sewadar (helper) is appointed on casual basis, i.e., 8 hours per day (170 rupees per day). At present, Giani Pritpal Singh (Master of Arts in Punjabi language), who has earlier served in a Gurudwara in Kandaghat town, is the caretaker of Gurudwara Saheb Chail . He is staying and looking after the Gurudwara along with his family, including three daughters, 24 hours a day and 7 days a week.

== Facilities ==
Gurudwara Saheb has a dormitory and few smaller guest rooms to accommodate visitors for a free of charge overnight stay. The Langar hall is located at the rear side of the Gurudwara. Volunteer contributions are encouraged to facilitate smooth functioning of the Gurudwara, due to limited number of Sikh population and visitors in the region. An official helper is provided with a free accommodation under the dormitory hall.

At present, Gurudwara requires huge amount of funds and services for repairs of all the associated buildings, and smooth functioning. Due to lack of government involvement, Gurudwara management and volunteers are constantly requested to directly get involved in repairs of its facilities. Transferring funds to the caretaker or any one else without any transparency are strictly discouraged. All contributions should be followed and accounted for by volunteers and caretakers.

== Location ==
Gurudwara is approximately 200 meters from the main Chail bus station. It can be reached by a steep road (gradient 35 degrees) from the Chail post office.

== Annual celebrations ==
Gurudwara management committee under the leadership of an appointed caretaker along with Chail Military School Chail administration regularly organizes Baisakhi and Gurupurab. In 2014, approximately 1000 devotees reached from all over North India to participate in celebration of Gurupurv on the eve of Guru Nanak Jayanti and community food Langar was arranged for everyone. Due to constant efforts on local, international and social media by the management committee including the Granthi, Chail Gurudwara has initiated celebrations on other occasions as well. Devotees from several parts of India and other parts of the world are actively involved in these arrangements.

== Renovations ==
Gurudwara is being constantly repaired and upgraded with efforts of sangat, and Georgian Association North. Two different phases were planned for its renovation. The first phase was carried out in 2007. The general church architecture of Gurudwara is preserved but doors, windows, roof and floor have been replaced. The next phase will be carried out after appropriate funds are collected. This will include renovation of attached and adjacent buildings.

=== Gallery ===
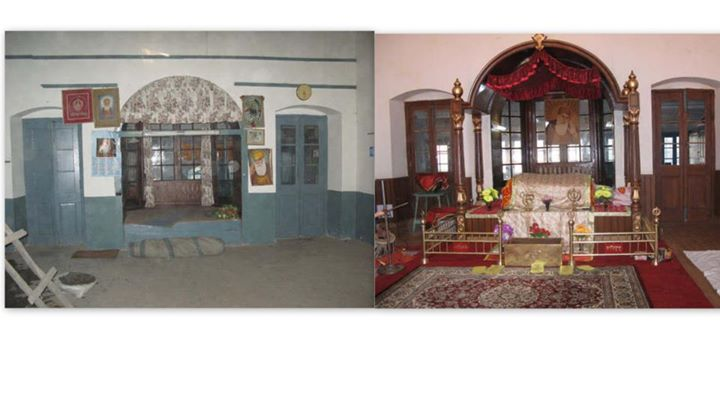
Chail Gurudwara before and after renovation

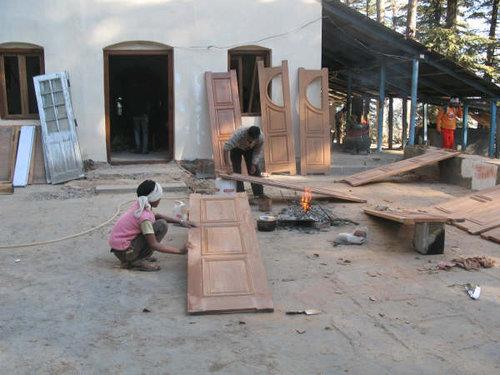
Doors and Windows replaced at Chail Gurudwara by Georgian Association

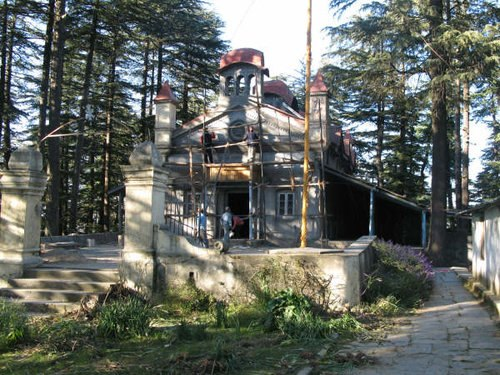
Renovation of Chail Gurudwara by Georgian Association

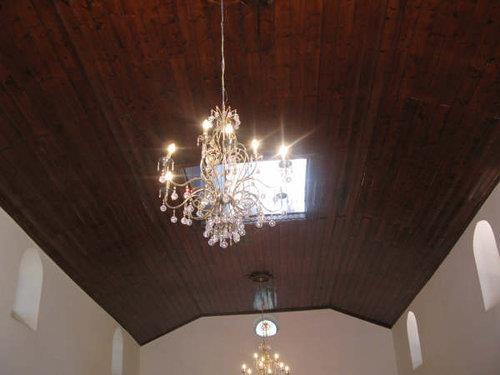
Renovated Gurudwara Roof Chail

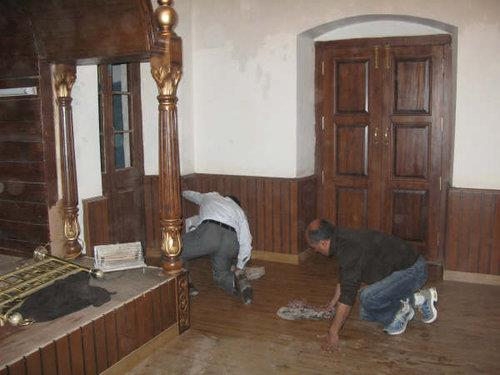
Renovation of the floor of Gurudwara Sahib Chail

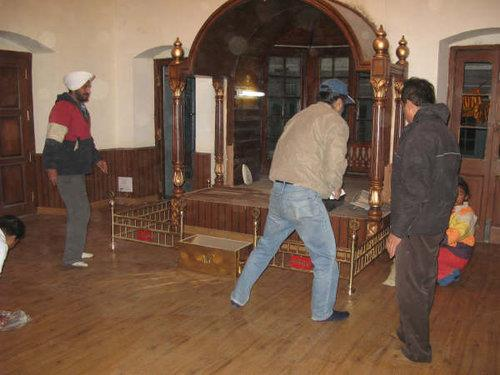
Repairing the inside of Gurudwara Sahib Chail
