= D. P. K. Pillay =

Indian Army officer

Colonel Divakaran Padma Kumar Pillay Shaurya Chakra
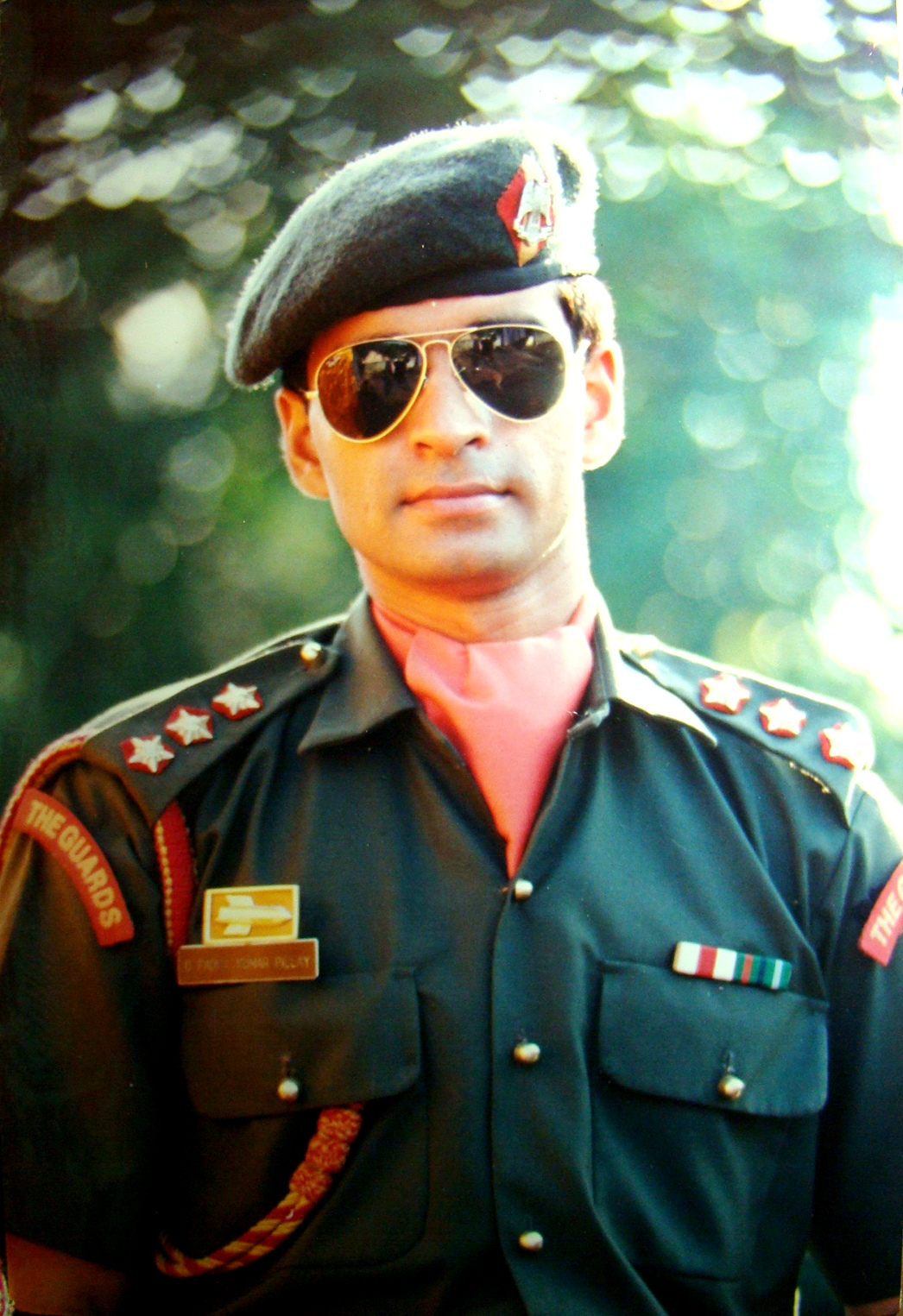
- Born: 12 August 1967 (age 59)
- Military career
- Allegiance: India
- Branch: Indian Army
- Unit: Brigade of the Guards
- Awards: Shaurya Chakra

Colonel (Dr.) Divakaran Padma Kumar (DPK) Pillay, SC (born 12 August 1967) is a former Indian Army officer and recipient of the Shaurya Chakra. During fierce operations in Longdi Pabram village, a hamlet in the remote Tamenglong district of Manipur in India's northeast, he sustained multiple gunshot wounds at close range while leading his unit in a firefight. Despite his injuries, he declined evacuation and continued to command his troops. During the operation, two civilian children—Dingamang Pamei and Masebiliu Pamei—were found trapped inside a village hut amid crossfire. Col Pillay moved the children out of the affected area and ensured their safety, placing their lives above his own.

== Early life and education ==
Pillay was born on 12 August 1967 in a Malayali Nair family in Kannur, Kerala, India, to Major and Mrs A.V. Divakaran Pillay. His parents originally hailed from the Kollam District of Travancore kingdom and Kannur district. His father served as an officer in the Indian army, while his grandfather was an officer in the Nair Brigade of Travancore. He was educated at Bangalore Military School in Bangalore, Karnataka. He went on to join the 72nd course of National Defence Academy in 1984, which he graduated in 1988 with a bachelor's degree in Arts. Pillay also holds a master's degree from Sikkim Manipal University.

Pillay was awarded a Ph.D. by Panjab University, Chandigarh for his doctoral thesis on "Evaluation of Models of Human Security with Special Reference to India". His thesis examines the concept of human security as propounded by various agencies like the UN, multilateral agencies and NGO's as well as countries such as Japan, Canada, and other countries. From his thesis, an article titled "Applying Human Security in Indian Context" has been published by Routledge in its publication Strategic Analysis Issue no 40 Volume 1.

== Military career ==
After graduating from the National Defence Academy in 1988, Pillay was commissioned into the 4th battalion of the Brigade of the Guards (4 Guards). He saw active service in the Indian states of Punjab and Jammu and Kashmir before moving to the 8th battalion of the Brigade of the Guards (8 Guards) deployed in India's northeast, where he was involved in an encounter in which he nearly lost his life with multiple gunshots directed on his chest and arm and a grenade blast that exploded on his right foot and blew up a portion of the leg.

In a fateful patrol Pillay led in 1994, he was tasked to protect a few tribal villages during a phase of disturbance that involved ethnic clashes between Nagas and Kukis in Manipur's Tamenglong district. He managed to track down insurgents from the National Socialist Council of Nagaland (NSCN) hiding in Tamenglong and successfully ambushed them in Longdi Pabram village. However, after the surrender of the militants, Pillay, who was near fatally wounded, realised that there were two young children who were injured in the cross fire. When the helicopter arrived to evacuate him, he refused to be moved and insisted that the young children be taken to safety first.

This noble act won over not only the villagers but also the insurgents in the area. Though the villagers presumed that Pillay had died in the encounter, a patrol team sent to the village in March 2010 connected the villagers to Pillay who was immediately invited and felicitated in a major way by the village. The soldier's humanitarian service has also earned him a moniker of "Pillay Pamei" among the local population. "Pamei" is a surname and clan of the influential Zeliangrong community residing in the village. Pillay has thereafter returned several times to the village and has organised several activities for development of the region, earning him the sobriquet of "Hero of Manipur" and "Savior of Longdi Pabram".

== Philosophy ==
When asked why he chose his course of action over his own evacuation as he himself was dying, Pillay said that the "First thing that came to my mind as a trained soldier was the safety of the children and all others. I was trained to sacrifice my own life and comfort for my people and my country who always come first. I always knew I was not amongst enemies but my own brothers and sisters. I could not choose the suffering and sorrow of the people I was sent to protect to that of mine. I could not allow the children to suffer. I had two options - one was to perpetuate the violence and the other to end it with me and say that all that is evil ends with me. I have always been inspired by Mahatma Gandhi who said "Be the change you want to see in the world". I am glad I chose the latter - the harder right instead of the easier wrong!"

Pillay's philosophy of countering insurgency is simple: "Peace is not just an absence of violence but a consistent delivery of opportunities to survive and to improve and develop not just as an individual, but also as a community and a region. Despite the lack of glamour, peace is a better choice - the right choice. We must choose peace over violence."

== Post-military career ==
Pillay was also a research fellow at Institute of Defence Studies and Analyses (IDSA), New Delhi and at the Centre for Policy Research, New Delhi. He is also an alumnus of Geneva Centre for Security Policy where he has attended the NISC course in 2007. He also hold a graduate degree from Fordham University, New York City, having completed the module of the International Diploma in Humanitarian Assistance course serial no 42. He is also on the roster of United Nations Civil Military Coordinators having qualified on the UN CM Coordination course in 2014.

== Honours and awards ==
Pillay was selected to serve in his alma mater, Bangalore Military School, after he was decorated with the Shaurya Chakra, India's third highest peacetime gallantry award. The then Chief of Army Staff who presided over the School Golden Jubilee celebrations, General Shankar Roychowdhury, handpicked him to serve in Bangalore Military School for motivation of the young cadets to join the Indian Armed Forces. With this, Pillay earned the singular distinction of being the only "Georgian" to serve as the "Administrative Officer" (AO) at the prestigious institute. The school under his leadership went on to achieve exemplary results in all fields ranging from academics to sports to other extra-curricular activities. In 2006, he joined the Ministry of Defence as the Planning Officer (Defence) - the first service officer to do so. While on this assignment he represented the Ministry of Defence at the Conference on Disarmament at the UN office at Geneva, for the review conference on the use of Certain Conventional Weapons in 2007 and 2008. He was also part of the Indian delegation led by HE Pranab Mukherjee to the United Nations General Assembly in 2006.

Pillay was honoured by CNN IBN in the very inaugural edition of their program called India Positive. Col. Pillay was one of the only three awardees to be felicitated with the Special Achievement Award for his acts of courage and optimism and bringing about a bigger change in the country.

Shaurya Chakra		Wound Medal	
Samanya Seva Medal	Special Service Medal		Operation Parakram Medal
Sainya Seva Medal	50th Anniversary of Independence Medal	20 Years Long Service Medal	9 Years Long Service Medal

== See also ==
- Bangalore Military School
- Longdi Pabram
- Saurabh Singh Shekhawat
