= Chail, Himachal Pradesh =

Hill station in Himachal Pradesh, India

Chail
- Hill Station
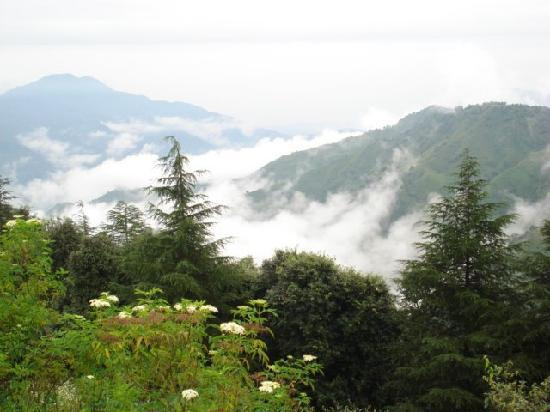
- View of hills from Chail in Solan district, Himachal Pradesh, India

- Location in Himachal Pradesh, India Chail (India)
- Coordinates: 30.9697°N 77.1975°E
- Country: India
- State: Himachal Pradesh
- District: Solan
- Elevation: 2,250 m (7,380 ft)

Languages
  - Official: Hindi
  - Regional: Mahasui (Baghati); (Keonthali)
- Time zone: UTC+5:30 (IST)
- Vehicle registration: HP- 13

Chail is a hill station in Solan district of Himachal Pradesh, India. It is 45 kilometres (28 mi) from Solan city and 44 kilometres (27 mi) from the state capital Shimla. It is known for its good weather and thick cedar forests. The Chail Palace, built in 1892 and rebuilt in 1951, acted as a summer retreat for the Maharaja of Patiala during the British Raj. The Chail cricket ground was also built by the Maharajas of Patiala.

Chail is also popular among hikers as it offers scenic views of the lower Himalayas. It has good trekking points from Junga, Kufri and Ashwani Khad at Solan. Many Eco camps are held here. Camping in Chail is a sought-after activity for enthusiasts, and there are many campsites for hikers. The patiala peg was also invented in Chail, at the Palace of Maharaja Patiala.

== History ==
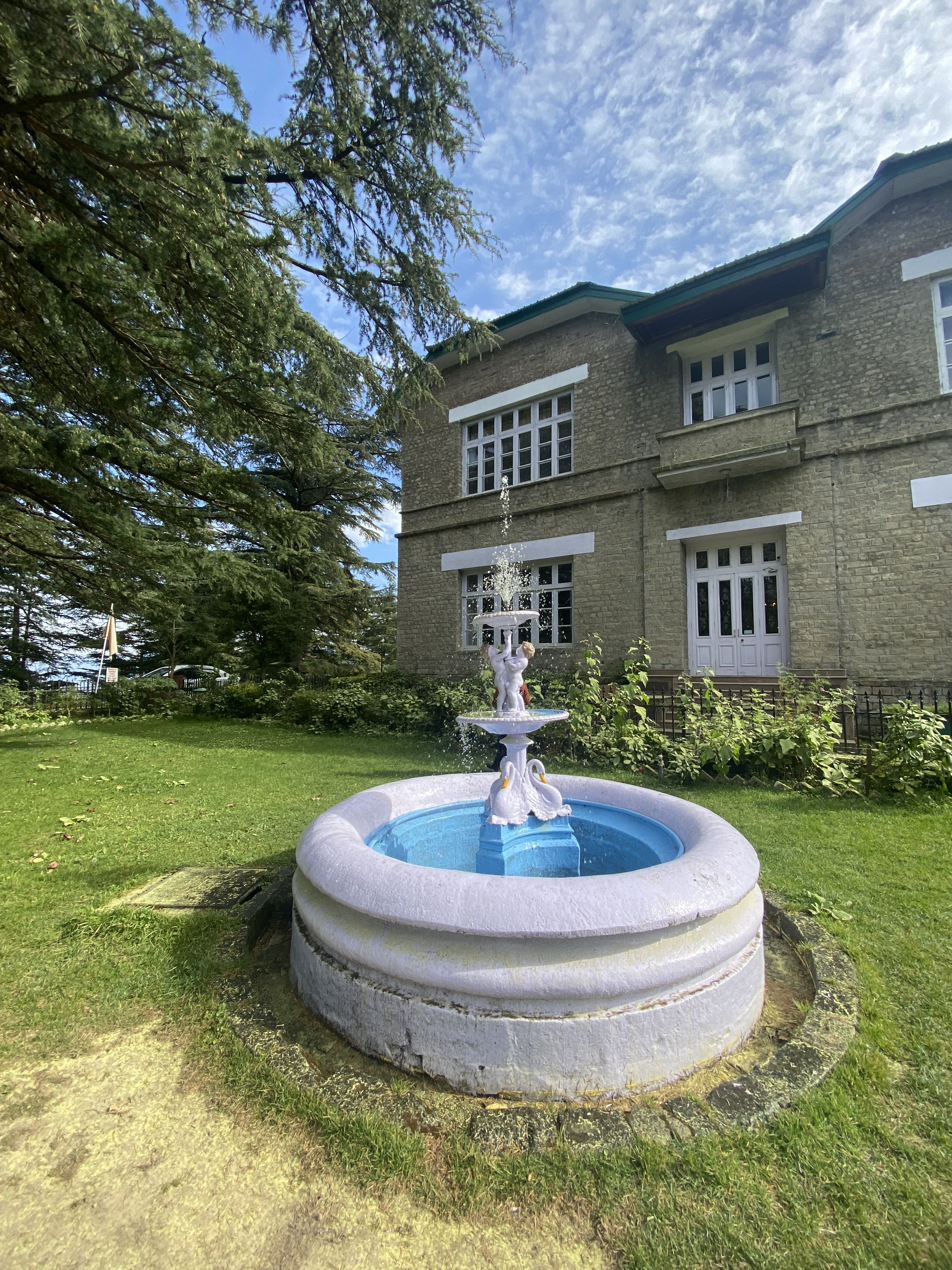
Chail Palace in October 2023

=== Pre-colonial history ===
Till the early 19th century, Chail was a part of the Keonthal state. In 1814, it was wrested from Keonthal by the Gurkha forces under Amar Singh Thapa.

=== Under the Patiala state ===
After the Anglo-Gurkha wars, the British transferred portions of Baghat and Keonthal to the Patiala state upon the payment of a nazrana of 2,80,000 rupees, through a sanad dated October 20, 1815. This way, the Chail hills came under the possession of the Patiala state. Three chief hills of Chail that hosted sites related to the state were Rajgarh, Padhewa, and Tibba Siddh. Over time, Chail became the summer capital of Patiala state. But prior to 1889, there were no houses on these hills, except a Shiv temple on Tibba Siddh. Maharaja Rajinder Singh of Patiala built a palace on Chail's Rajgarh hill, over 1891-92. By the early 20th century, the palace already had electricity. At that time, Chail also had a small bazaar, a dharamshala, and a few cottages. Alongside, Chail served as a sanitarium during the colonial period.

In the late 19th century, Maharaja Rajinder Singh also started building the Chail Cricket Ground, which was completed under the rule of his son and successor, Maharaja Bhupinder Singh of Patiala.

Chail gained significantly in popularity during the rule of Maharaja Bhupinder Singh, especially among the dwellers of Shimla, the summer capital of the British Raj. The visitors to Chail included the viceroys of India. The cricket ground, hunting shoots, swimming pool, and the sociability of the Maharaja contributed to this popularity. Upon his invitation, cricket teams from clubs of Punjab as well as of foreign countries (such as England and Australia) came and played at the Chail Cricket Ground. Bhupinder Singh also hosted an annual chess tournament at the Chail palace. Several famous chess players of that era, including the Yugoslavian grandmaster Boris Kostic, participated in these tournaments.

Once, in 1934, Bhupinder Singh was so impressed by the reception given to him at Banjar on one of his pleasure trips to Kullu and Shoja, that he invited the deities of this region to visit him in Chail. After a few months, the deities Shringi Rishi, Markandeya, Bhagwati Bala Sundari, Pandrik of Mandi, and Bhagwati of Shamshi visited Chail with their retinues via Luhri and Kufri. The festivities at Chail in their honour lasted a week.

=== Post-Independence history ===
After the Independence of India in 1947, for some time the hills of Chail were a part of PEPSU, alongside the nearby ones of Kasauli, Kandaghat, and Dharampur.

After Independence, Maharaja Yadavindra Singh of Patiala, the son and successor of Bhupinder Singh, demolished the old palace at Chail and built a new one in its place, called 'Rajgarh Palace', which was completed in 1951. This palace was acquired by the Himachal Pradesh Government in 1972, and turned into a hotel. This hotel is now known as 'Hotel Chail Palace' and also as 'The Palace, Chail'.

The Military School at Chail was originally established in 1925 in Jalandhar by George V of Great Britain (then the Prince of Wales), and was shifted to Chail in 1960. Likewise, the Forest Training School at Chail was originally at Mashobra, and was shifted to Chail in 1965.

== Geography ==
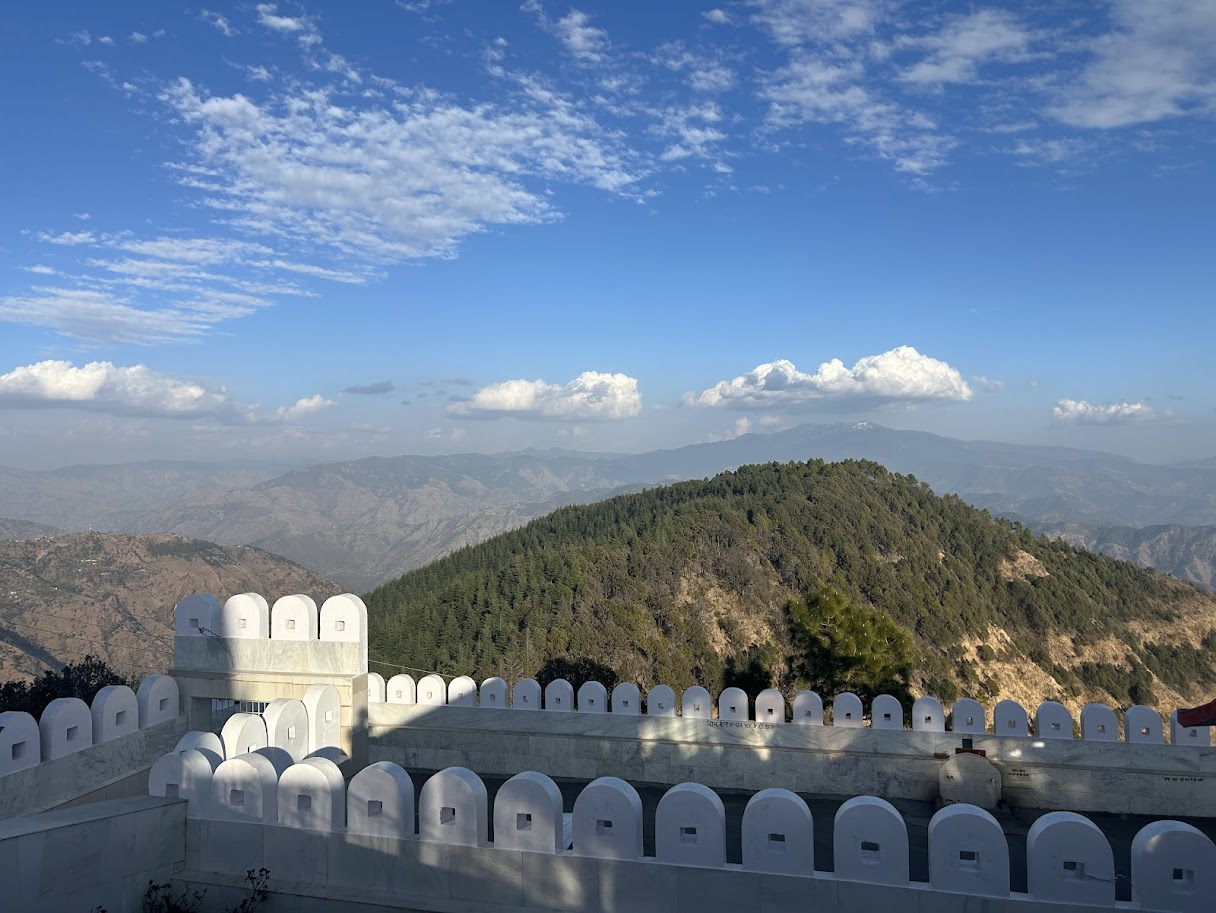
Churdhar peak (under light snow) as viewed from Kali Tibba temple near Chail

Chail is situated at an altitude of 2,250 m. The place is surrounded by the forests of chir pine and gigantic deodars. Shimla, Solan, and Kasauli can also be viewed at night from here. Chail is pleasant in summer and cold in the winter. Average annual rainfall is about 150 mm.

Chail

Climate chart (precipitation, max. and min. temperature)
J	F	M	A	M	J	J	A	S	O	N	D
61 1 −3	69 3 −2	61 9 4	53 15 11	66 23 14	175 23 16	424 22 15	434 17 15	160 16 14	33 15 11	13 5 3	28 2 1
- █ Average max. and min. temperatures in °C
- █ Precipitation totals in mm
Imperial conversion
J	F	M	A	M	J	J	A	S	O	N	D
2.4 34 27	2.7 37 28	2.4 48 39	2.1 59 52	2.6 73 57	6.9 73 61	17 72 59	17 63 59	6.3 61 57	1.3 59 52	0.5 41 37	1.1 36 34
- █ Average max. and min. temperatures in °F
- █ Precipitation totals in inches

== Attractions ==
- Rastriya Military School, Rastriya Military School Chail is one of the five Rastriya Military Schools in the country.
- Chail Military School, situated in ancient buildings made by Maharaja of Patiala.
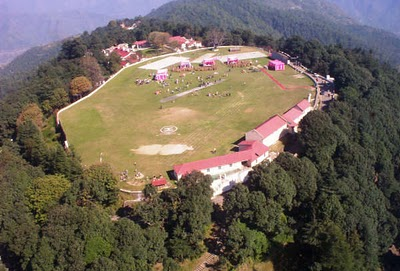
  The cricket ground at Chail.
- Cricket Ground- Surrounded by thick forests of deodar, a well-maintained Chail Cricket Ground is the highest cricket ground in the world. It was built in 1893. The ground is located at an altitude of 2,444 metres (8,018 ft). Chail served as the summer capital of Maharaja Bhupinder Singh (who was an avid cricket lover). It is used as the school playground by Chail Military School. During school vacations, it is also used as a polo ground. There is a basketball court and the same cricket ground is used for playing football as well as basketball. In one corner of the ground, there is a historic tree on which the Military School has constructed a tree house.
- Chail Gurudwara is also one of the main attractions of this place, it was the first building to be constructed by the Maharaja and after that, the palace was built. The Gurudwara was built in indo-western style in 1907, the 22 feet (6.7 m) high wooden roof is its main and highlighting feature.
- Chail Sanctuary (3 km)- The sanctuary was notified on 21 March 1976 near the town in district Shimla and covers an area of about 10,854.36 hectares. The Chail sanctuary has 'ghoral', 'kakkar', 'sambhar', 'red jungle fowl' and 'khalij' and 'cheer' pheasants. Machan like sighting posts have been built at Khuruin.
- Kali ka Tibba is situated at the top of a hill also known as Kali Devi Temple. It attracts a lot of pilgrims and tourists from all across the world.
- Lover's Point
- 'Stone Kumbd' - Shiv Mandir
- Visitors can also trek approximately 10 km from Junga, (District Shimla) to Chail. Junga is approximately 10 km from Sadhupul.
- Sadhupul- Sadhupul is a small village in Himachal Pradesh between Chail and Solan. It has a river restaurant near a small bridge spot constructed over the river "Ashwini". This bridge collapsed on 23 August 2014 by an overloaded truck. A New bridge has been constructed and dedicated to people in January 2018. A Water Park and Cafe at Sadhupul was opened on 30 June 2017.
- The 30 km road from Chail to Kufri winds with a lot of twists and turns through the deodar forests and is very lonely and dangerous as it is just a single road, in fact, all roads leading to Chail are single roads which are difficult to motor as the widths are very less and have a lot of turns. One must never drive here at night and should avoid it during the day as well, no wonder that very few vehicles are found on these roads. There are many small villages on the way and eateries that serve local food and chai (Indian sweet tea).

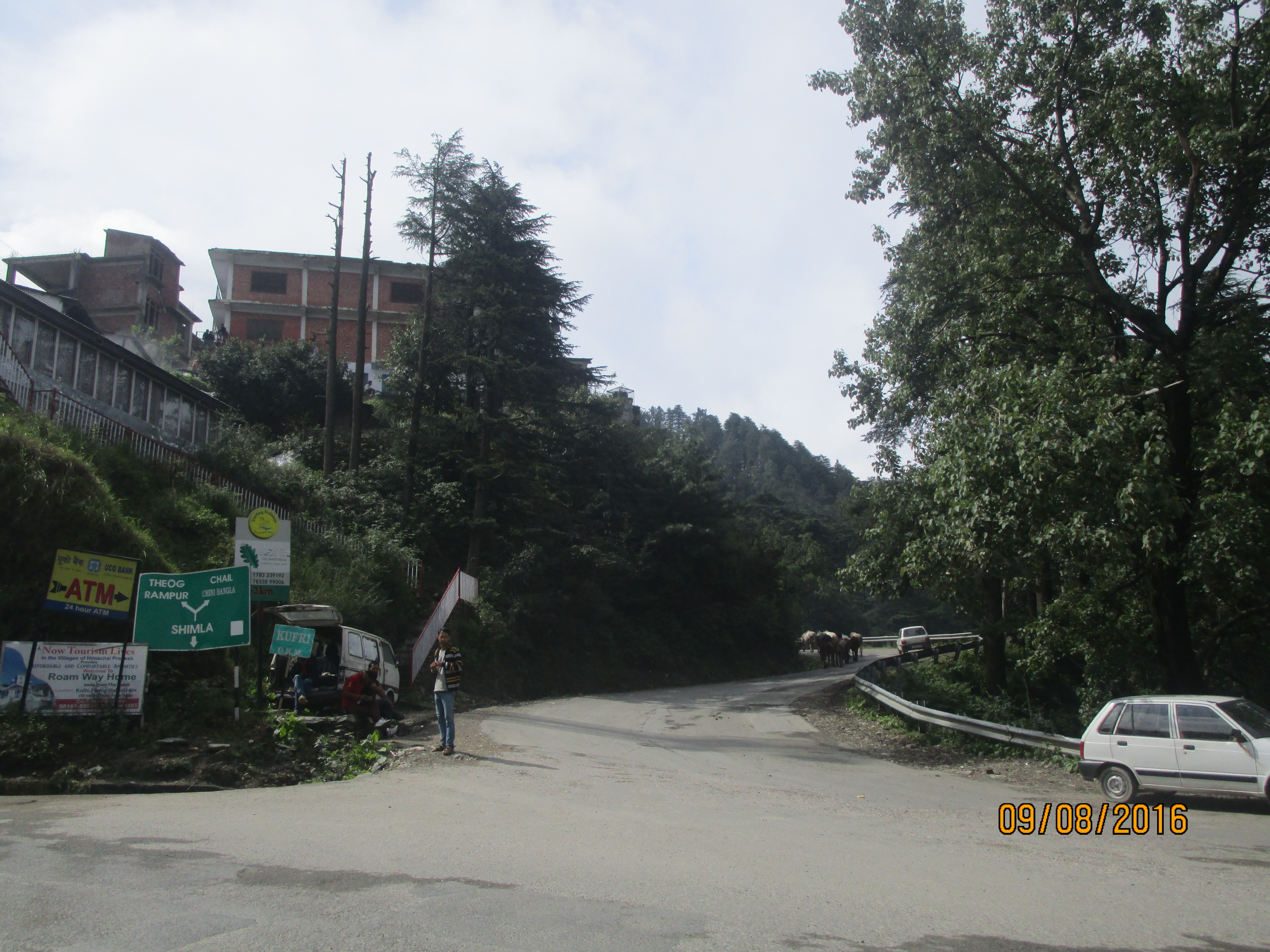
From Kufri, starting point to Chail road

== Access ==
- Roadways: Chail is connected by road from Chandigarh, Delhi and Shimla. From Shimla via Kufri the distance is 45 km and via Kandaghat is 49 km. Kalka is 86 km from Chail. Regular buses ply between Chail and major cities like Shimla, Chandigarh and Delhi.
- Airports: The nearest airports are at Chandigarh (120 km) and Shimla. Shimla Airport is located at Jubbarhati which is 37 km from Kandaghat.
- Railways- Kalka-Shimla railways: The narrow-gauge train runs on this World Heritage Site. The nearest railway station to Chail is Kandaghat.
