= Chail Sanctuary =

Wildlife sanctuary in Himachal Pradesh, India

Coordinates: 31.00°N 77.20°E

Chail Wildlife Sanctuary
- IUCN category IV (habitat/species management area)
- Location within Himachal Pradesh Location within India
- Interactive map of Chail Wildlife Sanctuary
- Location: Sirmour district, Himachal Pradesh, India
- Area: 16 km^{2} (6.2 sq mi)
- Established: 1976

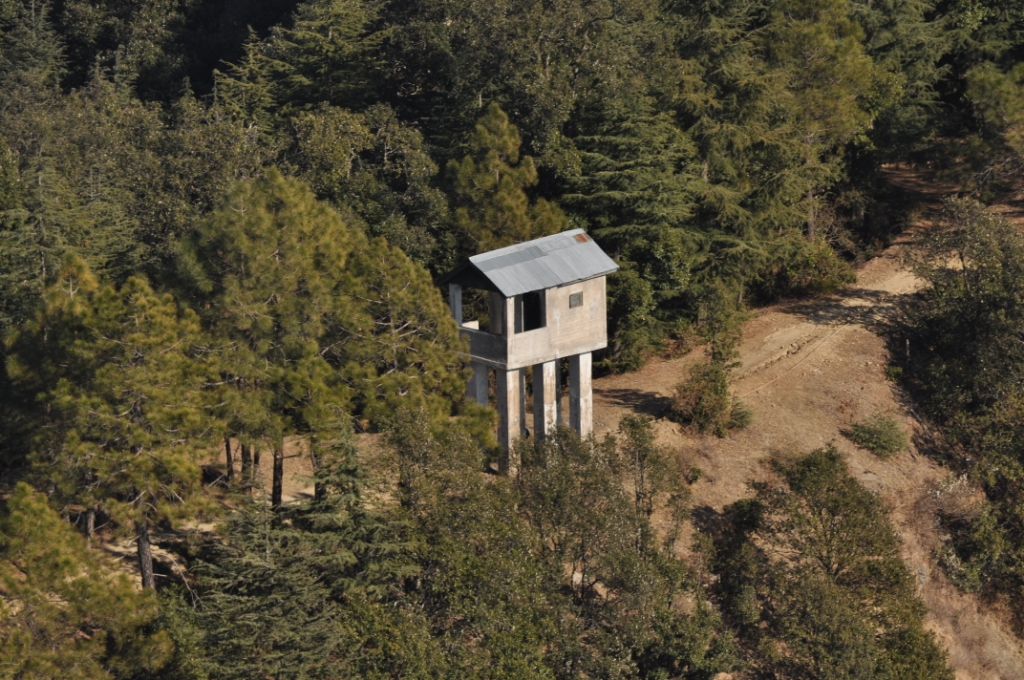
Watchtower in the sanctuary

Chail Sanctuary is located at Chail, a hill station which is home to sambar, goral and cheer pheasants at Blossom and Jhaja. Barking deer and kalij pheasants are seen during dusk and dawn. The best time to visit is from March to October.

Covering 110 km^{2}, Chail Sanctuary has a vast forest cover. In 1976, Chail Wildlife Sanctuary was identified and it was declared as a protected area under government consideration. The cheer pheasant breeding and rehabilitation programme was launched in 1988. There is a dense cover of oak, pine and grassland.

The sanctuary has mainly mammals. Large mammals include rhesus macaque, leopards, Indian muntjac and crested porcupine. Some of the other species found in the area include Himalayan black bear, wild boar, common langur, sambar and black naped hare. European red deer were also introduced half a century ago by the former Maharaja of Patiala but none of them were sighted in 1988 as per the survey conducted. The cheer breeding and rehabilitation centre has helped increase in the number of cheer pheasants nearby.

According to people from Himachal Pradesh, the Chail Wildlife Sanctuary is believed to be the main attraction in Chail. Thickly covered oak forests, deodar tree, Solang Valley in Himachal Pradesh, covers more than 10k hectares of land. It houses rhesus macaque, leopard, Indian muntjac, goral, porcupine, wild boar, langur and Himalayan black bear. It also has prevented few endangered species of reptiles and birds.

Chail Wildlife Sanctuary is reachable through Kalka - Shimla route by road and by train up to Kalka on Ambala-Kalka railway line. The Chail Wildlife Sanctuary is connected with major routes of Shimla and Chandigarh.
