= Bhonsala Military School =

Indian educational institution

Location
- Coordinates: 20°00′20″N 73°45′06″E

Information
- Opened: 1937
- Founder: B. S. Moonje
- School district: Nashik
- Campus size: 160 acres (0.65 km^{2})
- Campus type: Residential
- Accreditation: State Board
- Publication: Ramdandee Magazine

Bhonsala Military School is a secondary school in Nasik, Maharashtra, India, specialising in military education. It was founded by B. S. Moonje in 1937.

== Establishment ==
Bhonsala Military School, Nasik was established by Dr. Balkrishna Shivramji Moonje, who established the Central Hindu Military Education Society at Nasik in 1935 and started the school on June 12, 1937.

Over the years, the school has established itself as a school catering for educational needs of students from all over India while also serving as a focal point for military education. In 1995, the school was granted affiliation by the Indian Public Schools' Conference, an association of heads of leading public schools of the country.

The school began in the Surgana Palace in Nasik City with 90 students on its roll. The maharaja of erstwhile Gwalior State, H.H. Shriman Jivajirao Scindia, inaugurated the main building of the school. In his inaugural speech, he said, "It is not a mere coincidence that within a short period of the opening of a first rate public school in India (Doon School, Dehradun), we are here today to open a first rate Military School." The governor of Bombay State, Sir Roger Lumley, laid the foundation stone of the school's present main building.

== Founder ==
In 1935, B. S. Moonje established the Central Hindu Military Education Society at Nashik at the age of 63 with the aim of 'Indianisation' of the army (Indian Defense) and started 'Bhonsala Military School' in 1937. He was a believer in the Indianisation of the army during the British rule, and he was also a believer in the indispensability of military training to Indian youth.

== Facilities ==
The school has a large athletics facility including a football ground, athletic track, basketball court, volleyball court, hockey ground, an area for horse riding, a rifle shooting yard and an international level swimming pool. Bhonsala has also been known for high performance in sports, recognized by the Sports Authority of India (SAI). Virendra Singh is one of the experienced coaches of Bhonsala military School, who has encouraged many international level performers. One of his students is the long distance runner Sanjivani Jadhav.
