= Indianisation (British India) =

Allowing Indians into government posts formerly reserved to Europeans

Indianisation of British colonial bureaucracy was a process introduced in the later period of British India (early 20th century) whereby Indian officers were promoted to more senior positions in government services, formerly reserved for the British. In the Indian police, the rank of Deputy Superintendent was introduced to prepare Indian officers for promotion to higher rank. In the armed forces, the process referred to the replacement of British officers by Indians. Progress was slow and unsatisfactory to Indian nationalist politicians, and subsequent events overtook the programme, mainly the Second World War and the Partition and independence which followed it.

== Indian Armed Force ==
First mooted by Sir Henry Lawrence in 1844 as way to retain Indian sepoys (soldiers) in the British-Indian military service, thereby preventing them from peddling their martial expertise to Indian rulers, the Indianisation of the Indian Army's officer corps was seriously discussed by the higher echelons of the Raj as well as by Indian nationalist politicians and activists since the 1880s. The debate revolved around two inter-related questions. First, did Indians have the same aptitude for military command as the British? Second, if it was determined that they did, how would they be integrated into the Indian Army's command structure in a way that did not endanger the continuance of Britain's rule over India? The second question was especially important to the British, as the "sepoy mutiny" of 1857-8 was still fresh in their minds. Indeed, some British officers remarked that giving Indians officer training would render them too efficient and therefore dangerous, while others thought the demand was not legitimate because it was advanced by "false" urban middle-class Indians, and not by the "real" Indians of the rural "martial races" who by this time provided most of the Army's manpower and who "wisely realised" that the King's Commission was "properly reserved for the governing [ie British] race." Still others thought that the sanctioning of Indian King's Commissioned officers would negatively affect the Indian Army's efficiency. Indian nationalists, however thought that, by not allowing Indians King's Commissions, the British were not honouring the promise in the Queen's Proclamation of 1858 to open employment to Indians in all branches of British-India's government.

In 1901, Lord Curzon, one of the most controversial British Viceroys of India, sought to solve the vexing Indianisation question once and for all by founding the Imperial Cadet Corps (ICC), which was intended to provide military education and special officer commissions to Indian princes and aristocrats. The ICC failed, for two reasons. First, the special officer commissions awarded to ICC graduates were "extra-regimental" and did not bestow the holder with powers of command over anyone, British or Indian. Second, the ICC's purpose was unclear: was it to be a military training institution or a finishing school for a tiny minority of Indian princes? In 1915, the ICC was disbanded.

Had it not been for the advent of the First World War, during which India recruited about 1.3 million men for the British and Allied war effort, and increasing Indian nationalist pressure for tangible rewards for their loyalty, the Indianisation issue might have died. It did not, and on 20 August 1917, it was announced that Indians were eligible for King's Commissions in the Indian Army. The first 9 Indians awarded King's Commissions were graduates of the ICC. Ten places were now reserved for Indians at Sandhurst. The Sandhurst training directly pitted young Indian men against young Europeans in conditions alien to their upbringing and experience, and not surprisingly the results were unsatisfactory. Of the first batch of 25 cadets admitted to Sandhurst, ten failed to meet the requisite standard, two died, two resigned, one was deprived of his commission, and ten passed. To remedy this, on 13 March 1922 the Prince of Wales Royal Indian Military College was established for preparing native Indian cadets for entry to Sandhurst.

In the meantime, the first measure taken by the British government to "Indianise" the army – the Eight Unit Scheme of Indianisation – was announced on 17 February 1923. Indian proposals for faster induction were rejected, and equally unrealistic plans for indianisation over forty years, with restricted kinds of commission, were suggested. Finally, only eight units of the Indian Army were accepted by the British for Indianisation – only five infantry battalions out of 104, two cavalry regiments out of 21, and one pioneer battalion out of seven. They were to be reorganised on the British Army model, with King's Commissioned Indian Officers at every officer level and Indian Warrant Officers replacing Viceroy's Commissioned Officers. The eight units selected were:

- 7th Light Cavalry
- 16th Light Cavalry
- 2nd Battalion, 1st Punjab Regiment
- 5th (Royal) Battalion, 5th Mahratta Light Infantry
- 1st Battalion, 7th Rajput Regiment
- 1st Battalion, 14th Punjab Regiment
- 4th Battalion, 19th Hyderabad Regiment
- 2nd Battalion, 1st Madras Pioneers

Of these eight units, the 2nd Battalion the 1st Madras Pioneers was disbanded in 1933 for economic reasons. However, after ten years another eight units were chosen for Indianisation, one of which was the wartime 8th Battalion the 19th Hyderabad Regiment, today the 4th Battalion, the Kumaon Regiment of the Indian Army.

Indianisation was considered a failure by the Indians, due to the refusal of the British Government to increase the extremely slow rate of induction and the reluctance of the British to accept Indian officers on an equal footing, both professionally and socially. The scheme was suspended at the outbreak of the Second World War, at which point only a handful of military units had been Indianised. The process was never reintroduced, as there was a wartime influx of Emergency Commissioned Officers, both British and British Indian, posted into all units. As a result, by the end of the war the highest-ranked British Indian was a brigadier.

== Surveyors ==
In 19th century Geological Survey of India GSI trained native surveyors, who were called pandit, some notable ones include cousins Nain Singh Rawat and Krishna Singh Rawat. Native surveyors undertook several surveys including Great Trigonometrical Survey, 1869 Kailash-Mansarovar expedition, 1871–1872 Shigache–Lhasa expedition, 1873–1874 Yarkand–Kashgar expedition, second expedition of this area by Sir Thomas Douglas Forsyth, 1878–1882 Darjeeling–Lhasa–Mongolia expedition, etc.

== See also ==
- Indianisation
- Sanskritization
- Vietnamization – U.S. foreign policy during the Vietnam War
