= Macaulayism =

Education policy introduced in British colonies

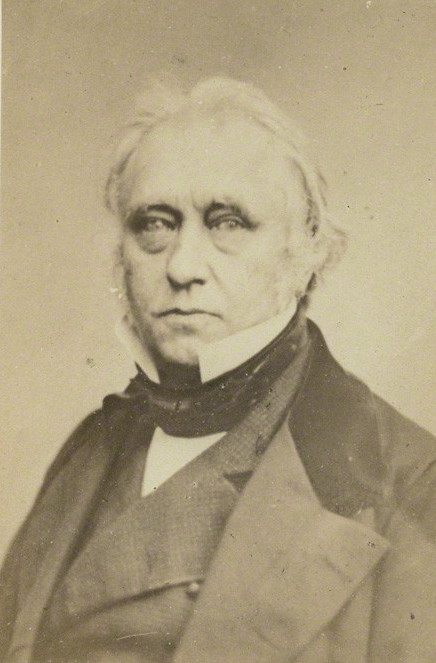
Thomas Babington Macaulay (1800–1859)

Macaulayism refers to the policy of introducing the English education system to British colonies. The term is derived from the name of British politician Thomas Babington Macaulay (1800–1859), who served on the Governor-General's Council and was instrumental in making English the medium of instruction for higher education in India.

== History ==
=== Thomas Macaulay ===
Thomas Babington Macaulay was born in Leicestershire, England, on 25 October 1800, the son of Reverend Zachary Macaulay, a member of the Clapham Sect, former governor of the colony of Sierra Leone and anti-slavery activist. His mother was Selina Mills, a pupil of the great British moralist, Hannah More.

Elected to the House of Commons of the United Kingdom in 1830 as a member of the reformist Whig party, Macaulay was named in 1834 as an inaugural member of a governing Supreme Council of India. Macaulay spent the next four years in India, where he devoted his efforts to reforming the Indian criminal code, putting the British and natives on an equal legal footing, and to establishing an educational system based upon the British model and destroying ancient Indian teaching methods. Macaulay wanted the government to spend money only on imparting Western education and not on oriental education. He advocated the shutting down of all colleges where only eastern philosophy and subjects were taught, which involved introducing Indians to European ideas from the Renaissance, the Scientific Revolution and the Enlightenment.

Macaulay held Western culture in high esteem, and was dismissive of Indian culture, which he perceived as stagnant and something which had fallen well behind mainstream (without ever once reading or looking at the Indian texts) European scientific and philosophical thought. He once claimed that:

A single shelf of a good European library was worth the whole native literature of India and Arabia.

Essentially, Macaulay saw his undertaking as a "civilising mission":

We must at present do our best to form a class who may be interpreters between us and the millions whom we govern; a class of persons, Indian in blood and colour, but English in taste, in opinions, in morals, and in intellect. To that class we may leave it to refine the vernacular dialects of the country, to enrich those dialects with terms of science borrowed from the Western nomenclature, and to render them by degrees fit vehicles for conveying knowledge to the great mass of the population.

=== "Macaulayism" and modern India ===
Since the second half of the 20th century, Nationalists in India have criticised Macaulay his views on Hinduism and Indian culture at large, which they claim skewed his educational policies.

Speaking at a national seminar on "Decolonising English Education" in 2001, professor Kapil Kapoor of Jawaharlal Nehru University highlighted that mainstream English-language education in India today has tended to "marginalise inherited learning" and uproot academics from traditional 'Indian modes of thought', inducing in them "a spirit of self-denigration (ISO: hīnabhāvanā )." Many Indian nationalists have criticised Macaulayism, claiming that it uprooted Indian traditions in sectors such as finance and replaced them with a foreign system which was wholly unsuited to India. In addition, they claim that Macaulayism caused foreign systems of thought to become prioritised over Indian systems of thought, particularly Hindu systems of thought.

== Similar terms in other parts of Asia ==
While not directly related to "Macaulayism", similar terms in other parts of Asia revolve around the adoption of Western cultural habits. "Pinkerton syndrome" in Singapore, kalu sudda in Sri Lanka and "崇洋媚外" in China are some examples for these cultural adoptions. Reports and incidences of such behaviour and attitudes are also found in Thailand, Malaysia, Hong Kong, Philippines, Japan and South Korea.

== See also ==
- Education in India
- English Education Act, 1835
