= All India Sainik Schools Entrance Exam =

National-level entrance examination conducted by the National Testing Agency (NTA)

All India Sainik Schools Entrance Examination
- Acronym: AISSEE
- Type: Entrance Examination
- Administrator: National Testing Agency
- Purpose: Admission to Sainik Schools and New Sainik Schools
- Year started: 1961
- Duration: 2.5 hours (Class 6), 3 hours (Class 9)
- Offered: Annually
- Regions: India
- Languages: English, Hindi, and regional languages
- Prerequisites: Age 10–12 (Class 6), 13–15 (Class 9)
- Fee: Varies by category (General/OBC: ₹800, SC/ST: ₹650)
- Website: exams.nta.ac.in/AISSEE/

The All India Sainik Schools Entrance Examination (AISSEE) is a national-level entrance examination conducted by the National Testing Agency (NTA) for admission to Sainik Schools and New Sainik Schools across India. These CBSE-affiliated English-medium residential schools prepare students for entry into the National Defence Academy (NDA), Indian Naval Academy, and other officer training academies.

== History ==
Established in 1961 under the Ministry of Defence, Sainik Schools were created to promote discipline, academic excellence, and military training among young students aspiring to join the Indian Armed Forces. Since 2021, girls have been eligible for admission to Class 6 across all Sainik Schools, marking a significant step toward gender inclusivity.

== Eligibility ==
Eligibility criteria for AISSEE vary by class:

- Class 6: Candidates must be aged 10–12 years as of March 31 of the admission year. Both boys and girls are eligible.
- Class 9: Candidates must be aged 13–15 years as of March 31 and have completed Class 8 from a recognized school. Only boys are eligible in some schools, though policies are evolving.

== Examination Structure ==
The AISSEE is conducted in a pen-and-paper format across multiple sessions, with scores normalized to ensure fairness. The exam is offered in English, Hindi, and select regional languages.

- Class 6 Exam: Duration of 2.5 hours, covering four subjects - Language, Mathematics, Intelligence, and General Knowledge. The total marks for the exam will be 300. The other four sections contain 100 questions, with each question worth 2 marks.
- Class 9 Exam: Duration of 3 hours, covering Mathematics (50 questions × 4 marks) and Intelligence, English, General Science, and Social Science (25 questions × 2 marks each).It contains 150 questions carrying a total of 400 marks.

== Participating institutes ==
The AISSEE facilitates admission to 33 traditional Sainik Schools and 56 New Sainik Schools across India, operating under the Ministry of Defence and in collaboration with private entities and state governments. Notable Sainik Schools include:

- Sainik School, Amaravathinagar
- Sainik School, Ambikapur
- Sainik School, Balachadi
- Sainik School, Bhubaneswar
- Sainik School, Chittorgarh
- Sainik School, Gopalganj
- Sainik School, Goalpara
- Sainik School, Imphal
- Sainik School, Jhunjhunu
- Sainik School Kazhakootam
- Sainik School, Kapurthala
- Sainik School, Korukonda
- Sainik School, Kunjpura
- Sainik School, Lucknow
- Sainik School, Manasbal
- Sainik School, Purulia
- Sainik School, Rewa
- Sainik School, Rewari
- Sainik School, Satara
- Sainik School, Sujanpur Tihra
- Sainik School, Tilaiya

== See also ==
- Sainik Schools
- National Testing Agency
- National Defence Academy
- Indian Naval Academy
