= Sudhir Kumar Walia =

Officer of the Indian Army, awarded the Ashoka Chakra

Major Sudhir Kumar Walia AC, SM & Bar, ADC
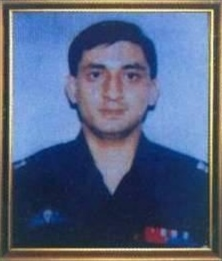
- Portrait of Major Sudhir Kumar Walia
- Born: 24 May 1969; Banuri, Palampur, Kangra, Himachal Pradesh
- Died: 29 August 1999 (aged 30); Fallen in action at Haphruda, Kupwara, Jammu and Kashmir
- Alma mater: Indian Military Academy; National Defence Academy; Sainik School, Sujanpur Tihra
- Military career
- Allegiance: India
- Branch: Indian Army
- Service years: 1988 – 1999
- Rank: Major
- Nickname: Rambo of Indian Army
- Service number: IC-47623P
- Units: 9 Para (Special Forces); 4 Jat
- Conflicts: Operation Vijay; Counter-Insurgency in Kashmir
- Awards: Ashoka Chakra; Sena Medal (Bar); Sena Medal

Major Sudhir Kumar Walia, AC, SM & Bar ADC (24 May 1969 – 29 August 1999), popularly known as Rambo of Indian Army, was an officer of the Indian Army, who served in the elite 9 Para (SF). He was posthumously awarded the Ashoka Chakra, India's highest peacetime military decoration, by the then President, late K. R. Narayan, in January 2000. He also served as an ADC to the then COAS General Ved Prakash Malik.

== Early life ==
Sudhir was born on 24 May 1968 in Jodhpur Military Hospital, Rajasthan where his father Subedar Major Rulia Ram Walia was posted that time. His mother name was Rajeswari Devi. He was from Banuri, a village in the Kangra district in Himachal Pradesh, He had two siblings one brother named Arun (born on 2 October 1972) and a younger sister named Bindiya (born on 22 February 1976). He attended Government school Banuri before Sainik School, Sujanpur Tihra. He then gained admission into the National Defence Academy in 1984 at the age of 16.He was commissioned at age 20 the minimum age to be commissioned at the time.

== Military career ==
Sudhir graduated from the Indian Military Academy and was commissioned as a second lieutenant in the 4th Battalion, The Jat Regiment on 11 June 1988. He was a member of the Indian Peace Keeping Force (IPKF), who were sent to Sri Lanka on a peace mission. After he returned from Sri Lanka, he opted for the 9th Battalion, Para (SF), a special forces unit of the Indian Army that specialises in mountain operations. He also served two six-month terms at the Siachen Glacier. He was promoted as a lieutenant on 11 June 1990.

Walia was promoted as a captain on 11 June 1993, and was awarded the Sena Medal in 1994 on two occasions for his gallantry while combating militancy in Jammu and Kashmir. In 1997, he was sent to the United States for a specialised course and got the first position. He also spoke at the Pentagon during this mission. For his competence, he was respectfully called 'Colonel' during that course.

He was later served as Aide-de-camp (ADC) to the then Chief of the Army Staff (COAS), General Ved Prakash Malik. When the Kargil War broke out, he obtained a special permission from the COAS to go to the battlefield. Within ten days of his departure from Delhi, he led his team to capture Zulu Top at 5200 metres, in the Mushkoh Valley sector. When asked about his attack on Zulu Top without needing to acclimatise, Major Sudhir said: "Sir, you know that I'm a pahari (from the mountains). I don't need acclimatisation."

After the Kargil War ended, his team was assigned the duty of fighting terrorism in Jammu and Kashmir.

On 29 August 1999, he led an assault on a militant hideout in the Haphruda jungles of Kupwara district in Jammu and Kashmir. He killed 9 of the 20 militants present, and sustained several gunshot wounds in the process. Though he was unable to move, he continued to give orders to his team till they succeeded. He allowed himself to be evacuated only 35 minutes after the operation ended. He was airlifted to an Army hospital but succumbed to the injuries en route. For his bravery, he was posthumously awarded the Ashoka Chakra, the highest peacetime military decoration in India.

== Legacy ==
At Kangra, Himachal Pradesh a school has been renamed as Shaheed Major Sudhir Kumar Walia Government Senior Secondary School. A statue of Major Walia has been installed by his father Sub Maj Rulia Ram Walia at Palampur.

== In popular culture ==
Colonel Kale's book Rambo is a biographical book of Maj Walia. Also Gen Ved Prakash Malik under whom Maj Walia was an ADC, also mentioned his valour on 'Kargil - From Surprise To Victory'. Jaishree Laxmikant wrote a book on Walia named Coomar: The Story of Major Sudhir Walia, AC, SM*.
