= Neelakantan Jayachandran Nair =

Ashoka Chakra and Kirti Chakra recipient

Colonel N J Nair AC, KC
- Born: 17 February 1951; Ernakulam, Travancore-Cochin, now Kerala
- Died: 20 December 1993 (aged 42); Nagaland
- Education: National Defence Academy; Sainik School Kazhakootam
- Relatives: Kappazhom Raman Pillai
- Military career
- Allegiance: Republic of India
- Branch: Indian Army
- Service years: 1971–1993
- Rank: Colonel
- Nickname: NJ
- Service number: IC-25070K
- Unit: 16 Maratha Light Infantry
- Conflicts: Insurgency in Northeast India
- Awards: Ashoka Chakra; Kirti Chakra

Colonel Neelakantan Jayachandran Nair, AC, KC (popularly known as "NJ") was a highly decorated officer of the Indian Army. On 20 December 1993, while heading an advance party of the battalion, his convoy was ambushed by Naga rebels. Nair personally led the attack to break the ambush and sacrificed his life defending his men. For this act of valour, he was conferred the Ashoka Chakra.

Technically Nair is the most decorated officer of the Indian Army, as the only serviceman to have been awarded both the highest (Ashoka Chakra) and second highest (Kirti Chakra) awards for gallantry. The Eden Gardens in Kolkata has a stand named after him.

== Early life and education ==
He was born to R. Neelakantan Nair and P.Saraswathy Amma on 17 Feb 1951 at Ernakulam, then in Travancore-Cochin, now Kerala. He was a descendant of the former Dewan Peshkar of Travancore, Kappazhom Raman Pillai. Nair was an alumnus of Sainik School, Kazhakootam, Kerala. He then joined the National Defence Academy, Pune as part of the 38th course. He was a member of the 'I' Squadron. He attended the Defence Services Staff College in Wellington.

== Military career ==
Nair was commissioned into 16 Maratha Light Infantry on 13 June 1971. He was promoted to lieutenant on 13 June 1973 and to captain on 13 June 1977. His career in the Indian Army spanned over two decades, during which he had held varied command as well as staff appointments. He served in the IMTRAT in Bhutan. He also served as an instructor at the Army Intelligence school in Pune.

In 1983, in Mizoram, Nair engaged insurgents in close-quarters combat, for which he was awarded the Kirti Chakra in recognition of his exceptional gallantry. He was promoted to substantive major on 13 June 1984, and was promoted to lieutenant-colonel (by selection) on 1 January 1992.

In 1993, his unit, the 16th battalion the Maratha Light Infantry was deployed in Nagaland. In December 1993, he was leading an advance party convoy in Nagaland when they were ambushed by about one hundred insurgents. The overwhelming fire from automatic weapons killed one junior commissioned officer and 13 jawans on the spot. Col Nair, who was seriously injured, organised his jawans in an assault line and charged at the insurgents, who broke ranks and fled. Nair did not survive his injuries, and for his courage and gallantry he was awarded the Ashoka Chakra posthumously in 1994.

== Major decorations ==
- Ashoka Chakra
- Kirti Chakra

== See also ==
- Kappazhom Raman Pillai
