= Sainik School Kazhakootam =

Coordinates: 08°34′56″N 76°52′22″E

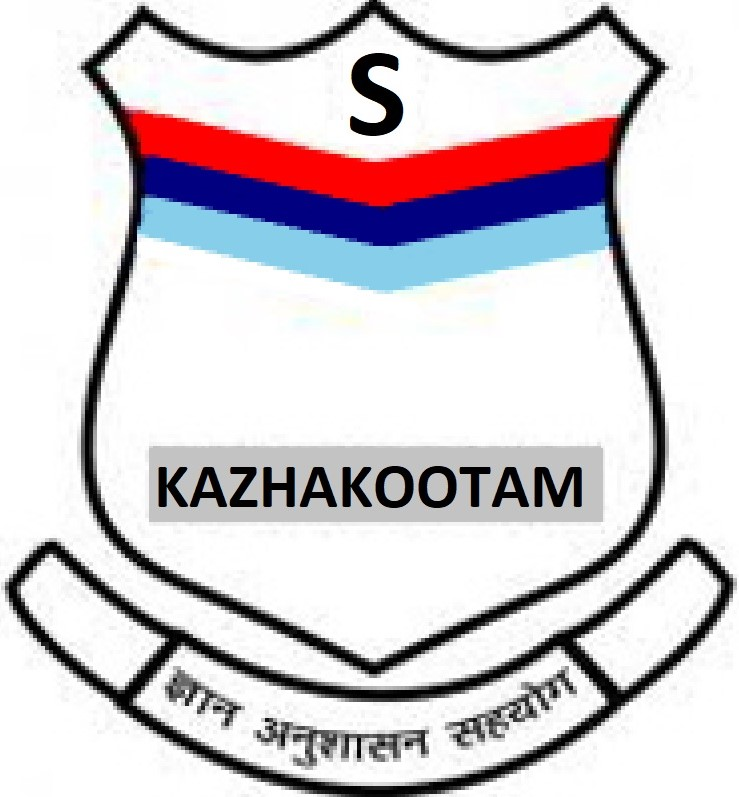
- The School Crest
- Kazhakootam; India

Information
- Type: Public school Run by the government of India
- Motto: Gyan, Anushasan, Sahayog (Knowledge, Discipline, Co-operation)
- Established: 1962
- Founder: V. K. Krishna Menon
- Principal: Col. Dhirendra Kumar
- Grades: Classes VI - XII
- Gender: Boys and Girls
- Age: 10 to 18
- Campus size: 225-acre (0.91 km^{2})
- Campus type: Military Boarding School
- Colours: Red, Navy blue, and Sky blue
- Affiliation: Ministry of Defence (India)
- Pupils AKA: Kazhaks
- Website: https://www.sainikschooltvm.edu.in/

Sainik School Kazhakootam (often abbreviated as SSKZM), Thiruvananthapuram, Kerala, India, is a residential school under the Ministry of Defence, Government of India

The concept of Sainik Schools was proposed by V. K. Krishna Menon, who was the first Defence Minister of India from 1957 to 1962. The objective was to set up schools run on military lines in each state of India, which would facilitate the grooming of boys for intake into the various military academies such as the National Defence Academy and the Indian Naval Academy, thus, rectifying the regional and class imbalance in the officer cadre of the Indian Military.

== Location ==
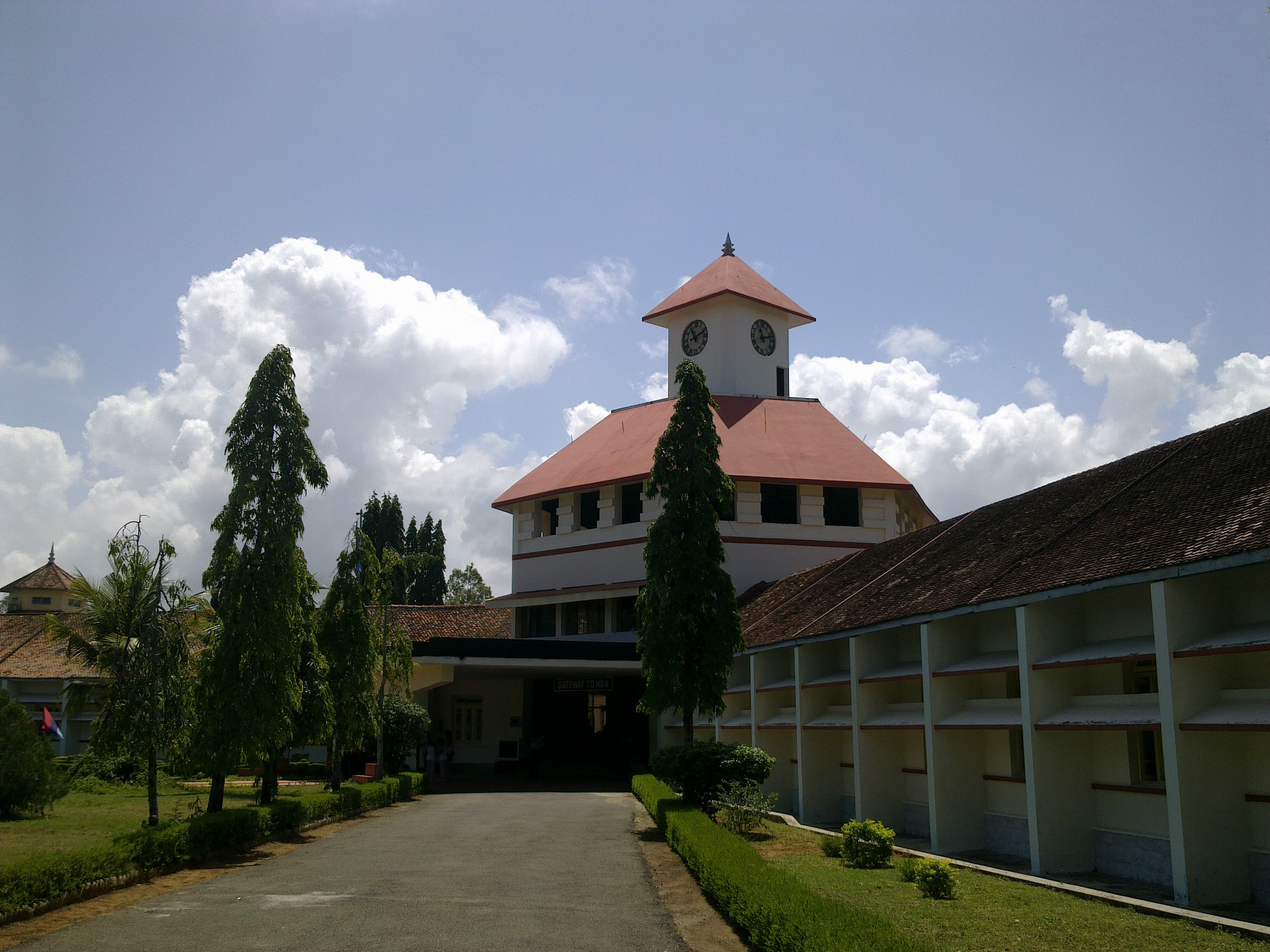
Academic Block of Sainik School, Kazhakootam, captured on Old Boys Reunion Day, 2010.

Kazhakootam was chosen as the location in the early 1960s by the then Chief Minister of Kerala, Pattom Thanu Pillai. An area of 300 acres (1.2 km^{2}) of undulating terrain was acquired on a hillock near Kazhakootam, close to National Highway 66 and about 18 km away from Thiruvananthapuram. The campus is located on a laterite cliff of 170 feet elevation between the Western Ghats and the Arabian Sea. A part of the land that was previously part of the campus (around 75 acres) was handed over to KINFRA in early 2000's on lease. The present land area of Sainik School campus is about 225 acres (0.91 km^{2}).

== Inception ==
Sainik School Kazhakootam started functioning in the barracks lent by the Indian Army at the army camp at Pangode, Thiruvananthapuram, on 20 January 1962. The initial intake was to classes V, VI, VII, and, VIII, and the strength at inception was 120. This increased to 132 six months later when admission to class XI was opened. The school's founding leadership include Lt. Col. B K Somaiah from the Indian Army as the first principal, Sqn. Ldr. Babu Lal from the Indian Air Force as the headmaster and Capt. T V S Nair from the Indian Army as the registrar.

The foundation stone of the new campus at Kazhakootam was laid by the then Defence Minister of India, V. K. Krishna Menon on 5 February 1962. Prof. J. C. Alexander, a professor at the College of Engineering, Trivandrum, designed the academic block, the 11 dormitories, and other associated infrastructure. The school shifted to the new campus in 1964.

== School crest, motto, and flag ==
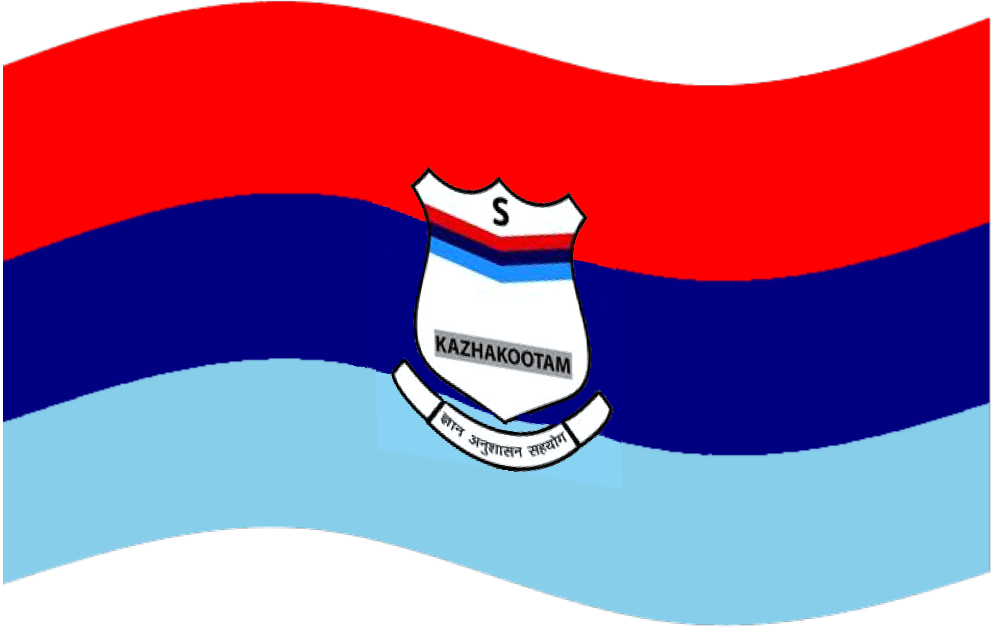
The Sainik School, Kazhakootam flag

The school flag has horizontal stripes of the three School Colours, with the school crest at the centre.

The red, navy-blue, and sky-blue stripes in the school crest are symbolic of the three arms of the Indian Defence Services. Red represents Army, blue represents Navy and sky blue represents Air Force. The letter S, for Sainik School, stands above the three stripes, and a steel-grey band, with the word Kazhakootam inscribed in it, is present below the stripes. Below the main crest is a fluttering ribbon, carrying the School Motto: Gyaan, Anushasan, Sahyog, signifying three of the most valuable qualities expected of a Sainik School Cadet, namely knowledge, discipline, and esprit-de-corps

== School songs and prayer ==
The English, Hindi, and Malayalam school songs and the Sanskrit prayer are sung in morning assemblies and on special occasions and functions. The English school song was composed by Mrs. Myrtle Jacob, a founding member of the English department of the school. saṃgacchadhwaṃ, the school Sanskrit prayer, is a verse taken from the Rigveda.

== Administration ==
Sainik School, Kazhakootam, like the other Sainik Schools, is governed by Sainik Schools Society, which is an autonomous body under the Ministry of Defence, Government of India. Sainik School, Lucknow, which is governed by the UP state government, is an exception. The society is headed by the board of governors, with the Union Defence Minister at the helm. The Chief Ministers or Education Ministers are part of the councils of Sainik Schools in their respective states. Further, a senior defence officer chairs a local board of administration. The Air Officer Commanding-in-Chief, Southern Air Command, is in charge of Sainik School, Kazhakootam. The principal, who is the academic and administrative head of the institute, is appointed on deputation and will be of the rank of colonel or an equivalent ranked officer either from the Indian Navy or the Indian Air Force. The Vice Principal (formerly Headmaster) and the Administrative Officer (formerly Registrar), are military officers of or equivalent to the ranks of Lt. Col. or Major, look after the academic and administrative affairs, respectively.

The academic activities are coordinated by a Senior Master who reports to the Vice Principal. The non-academic activities, such as estates, are managed by the Quarter Master, cadet's Mess by the Mess Manager, and the Medical Infirmary Room (MI Room) by a Medical Officer. In the absence of an Administrative Officer or Registrar, the role is handled by the Medical Officer.

Among cadets, there are various ranks such as,

Ranks	Description	Student belonging to
School Cadet Captain	Leader of the school	Class XII
School Cadet Adjutant	The vice-captain of the school	Class XII
School Cadet Quarter Master	Manages Admin-related duties	Class XII
School Sports Captain	Manages Sports-related duties	Class XII
School Academic Captain	Manages Duties related to Academics	Class XII
School Band Major	Heads School Band	Class XI
House Captains	Manages each of the 11 Houses	Class XII
Under Studies	Temporary office bearer at last term	
Sergeants	In all 11 houses	Class XI
Corporals	Only in Sub Junior Houses	Class X

== Infrastructure and facilities ==
The school has around 21 classrooms, with laboratories for computer, physics, biology and chemistry departments. There is a computer centre and science park, an arts and craft facility, a newly included cyber-dome and a library.

Sports facilities include a swimming pool, clay surfaced tennis court, concreted basketball court, volleyball courts, two football grounds in FIFA dimensions, two hockey courts, gymnastics, gymnasium and football grounds. The National Cadet Corps (India) has an independent Company under Kerala - Lakshadweep region for Sainik School Kazhakootam, called SS COY NCC. The school sends numerous cadets to Republic Day Parade held at Delhi every year.

There is a cadets' mess that can seat more than 700, with an in-house bakery to bake bread. Green initiatives include pig farming on the campus using food waste as fodder. There is an in-house laundry facility in the form of Dhobi Ghat, a cobbler's, post office, barber shop, stationery, and CSD Canteen facility. In the fallow land around school cash crops such as cashew is extensively cultivated.

There is a direct water supply pipeline to school from Aruvikkara river by Kerala Water Authority. There are also transformer facilities by KSEB within campus for continuous power supply. There is also a rainwater harvesting facility in the academic block.

== Houses ==
The school has a residential system of schooling. Only few students who are children of working staff of school enjoy day scholar facility. Others have to compulsorily opt for residential schooling.

The residential system in the school is largely a dormitory based one except for 16 students who are in their final year and are house captains and school appointments. These 16 students enjoy single room facility.

These dormitories are called houses. There are a total of 12 houses and the Houses are categorized into three, viz., Senior houses, Junior houses, and Sub-junior houses including a girls dormitory.

Dormitory No.	Name	Eponym
1	Azad	Chandra Shekhar Azad
2	Veluthampi	Velu Thampi Dalawa
3	Manekshaw	Sam Manekshaw
4	Nehru	Jawaharlal Nehru
5	Shivaji	Shivaji
6	Prasad	Rajendra Prasad
7	Ashoka	Ashoka
8	Rajaji	C. Rajagopalachari
9	Tagore	Rabindranath Tagore
10	Cariappa	K. M. Cariappa
11	Patel	Vallabhbhai Patel
12	Manikarnika	Rani of Jhansi

Every house except the Girls' Dormitory has an identical and symmetric structure. These dormitory systems have two large halls called wings. Each wing has around 30 beds. Hence approximate strength in a dormitory is around 60 students. In addition to this each dormitories have a common shared washroom facility having around 12 bathrooms and 12 toilets. The dormitory also has two single rooms for the House Captain of the House and also maybe a School Appointment.

Every dormitory has a first floor in which one faculty member resides. This faculty member is called as House Master. The dormitories also have two big study halls and an office room.

== Admission ==
Presently, boys are admitted to class VI and IX while girls are admitted only to class VI. All India Sainik Schools Entrance Exam (AISSEE), which are generally held on the first or second Sunday of January, are followed by a medical test for the shortlisted candidates. Boys and Girls who are not under 10 or over 11 years of age on 1 July of the year of admission are eligible for class VI admission. The respective age limits for class IX are 13 and 14.

=== Written test ===
For class VI admission, there will be two papers, viz., (i) Mathematical Knowledge Test & Language Ability Test and (ii) Intelligence Test, and the syllabus will be in line with that of class V CBSE syllabus. The test can be taken in English, Hindi, or Malayalam. For class IX admission the papers for written test are (i) Mathematics & Science and (ii) English and Social Studies, equivalent to class VIII CBSE syllabus. The class IX tests can be taken only in English.

=== Medical test ===
The written tests will be followed by a medical test, which is the last stage of the admission procedure.

== Faculty ==
The school has more than 30 teachers highly qualified from various disciplines such as Sciences, Social Sciences, Mathematics, Computers, Languages, Arts and Crafts. The former senior master of school Shri. K Rajendran from English Department is a recipient of National Award to Teachers (2009) from Hon.President of India Smt. Pratibha Patil on 5 September 2010. Another esteemed teacher from the school, Shri Mathew K. Thomas, was honored with the same award in 2021. Mr. K Sudhir (Roll No.1014/ Batch 1980) who was a faculty member during early 90's was the only alumni of the school who turned faculty later.

== Popular culture ==
The school was featured in multiple Malayalam cinema as location. The movies such as F. I. R. (1999) and The Truth (1998) directed by Shaji Kailas had few sequences shot inside the campus. There was a documentary based on the school that was made by Malayalam Film director Jubith Namradath (an alumnus of the school and director of Aabhaasam) called Marching Ahead (2014). The coordinator of drama club in school and senior faculty member of Malayalam department Smt. Sandhya R. had made a short film on water conservation that was entirely shot in the campus called Neerthulliye Kaanathaya Divasam(2017) many students and faculty had acted in the film. The 20 minute short film won Bharathan Memorial Award 2017.

== Notable alumni ==
Notable alumni
Name	year	Remarks
P. C. Thomas	1966	Ex-Member of Parliament
Rajeevnath	1967	Malayalam film director
Lt. Col. Joseph Samuel K.	1967	Co-founder Air Deccan
Col. Neelakantan Jayachandran Nair	1967	Ashoka Chakra, Kirti Chakra
Brigadier G. K. B. Nair	1968	Noted for setting up the Indian mission in Afghanistan
Lt. Gen. G. M. Nair	1968	Commander-in-Chief of the Kangra-based 9 Corps
Lt. Gen. Y. Chacko Tharakan	1970	AVSM, VSM; Director General Army Headquarters
Rajeev Sadanandan	1975	Health care policymaker and former bureaucrat (IAS 1985 Batch); Former Additional Chief Secretary, Health, Government of Kerala (during 2018 Nipah virus outbreak in Kerala)
Vice Admiral Ajit Kumar P.	1977	Former Vice Chief of Naval Staff
Air Marshal Vipin Indira Panabhan Nayar	1978	Commandant, Air Force Academy
Lt. Gen. Sarath Chand	1979	Former Vice Chief of Army Staff
Flying officer M.P. Anil Kumar	1981	Writer and historian
Mini Vasudevan	1982	Indian animal rights activist and Nari Shakti Puraskar 2019 winner
Air Marshal Balakrishnan Manikantan	1983	Air Officer Commanding-in-Chief, Southern Air Command
Josy Joseph	1991	Investigative journalist and author of Feast of Vultures: The Hidden Business of Democracy in India
Madhu Warrier	1994	Malayalam film actor and producer
Indrajith Sukumaran	1997	Malayalam actor
Capt. Radhakrishnan Nair Harshan	1997	Ashoka Chakra (Posthumous)
Prithviraj Sukumaran	2000	Malayalam actor, director, and producer
Christo Tomy	2005	Two-time National Award winning film director

== See also ==
- Sainik School
- National Defence Academy
- Indian Naval Academy
- Indian Army
- Indian Navy
- Indian Air Force
