= Sainik School, Satara =

Sainik School Satara

Location
- Satara, Maharashtra; India; 17°41′34″N 74°01′09″E

Information
- Type: Public, Boarding
- Established: 23 June 1961
- Grades: 6th to 12th
- Gender: Boys and Girls
- Campus size: 115-acre (0.47 km^{2})
- Affiliation: CBSE
- Website: Official Website

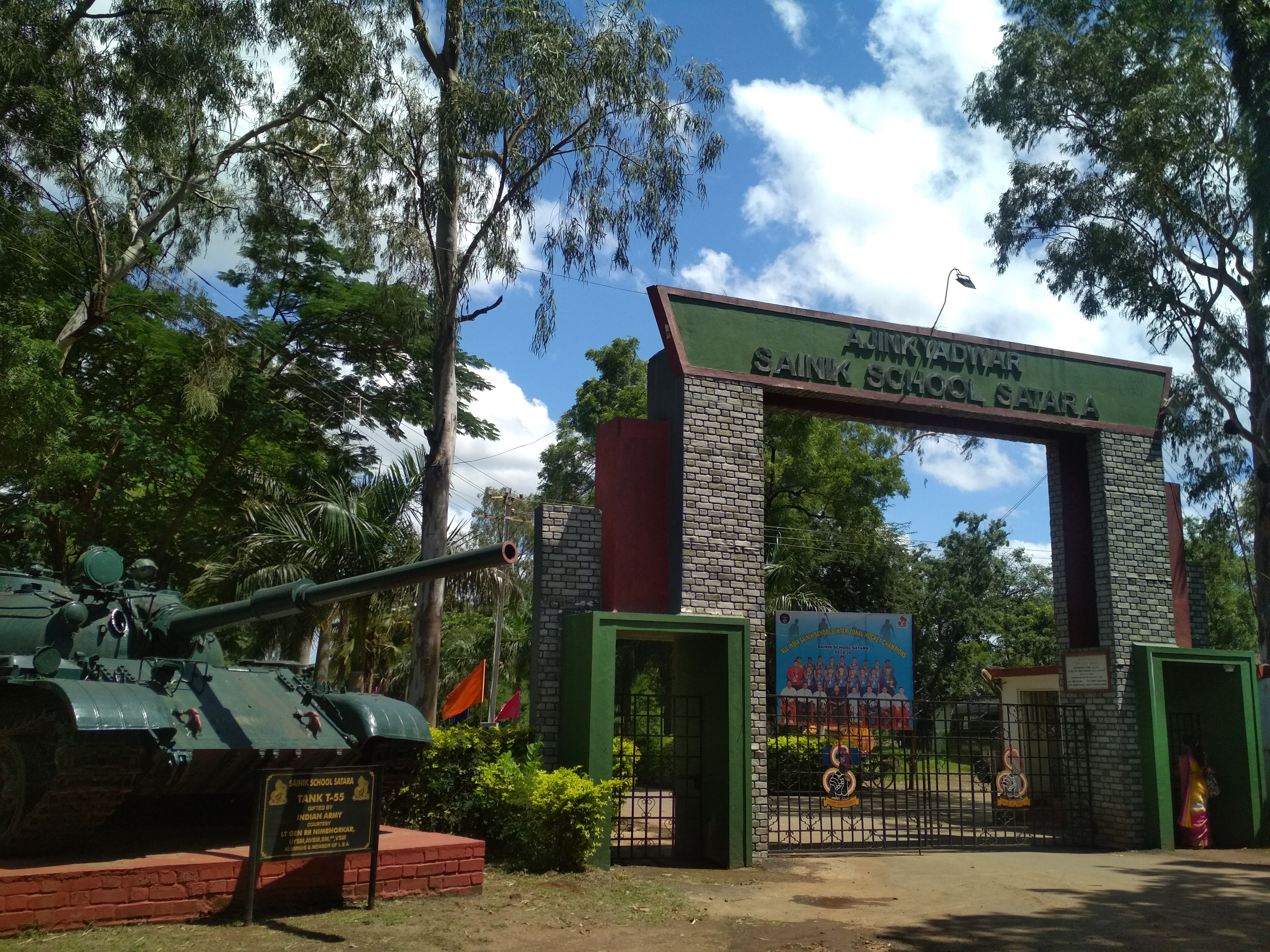
The entrance gate

Sainik School Satara is one of the 33 Sainik Schools of India. The medium of instruction is English. Established by Government of India on 23 June 1961 at Satara. It is affiliated to Central Board of Secondary Education and is a member of Indian Public Schools Conference (IPSC).It also has Primary Sainik School Satara attached to it.

It has the distinction of being the first of many such Sainik Schools in India. The school prepares boys and girls for entry into the National Defence Academy, Khadakwasla, Pune.

== History ==
Sainik School, Satara was founded on 23 Jun 1961 during the tenure of Shri Yashwantrao Chavan, the Chief Minister of Maharashtra State. It was inaugurated by the Defence Minister of India, Shri V K Krishna Menon with the aim of preparing boys academically, mentally and physically for entry into the National Defence Academy and other Defence Academies, who hail from financially weaker sections of the society and thereby removing the regional imbalance for such entries in the Armed Forces.

== Administration ==
The administration of Sainik School is vested in an autonomous body known as Sainik Schools Society under Ministry of Defence, India. Sainik Schools Society is headed by the Board of Governors under the Chairmanship of Raksha Mantri (Union Minister of Defense). The Chief Ministers/Education Ministers of the states where the Sainik Schools are located, are members of the Board of Governors. There is a Local Board of Administration for each school with a senior defense service officer as its Chairman.

The Flag Officer Maharashtra Area, Indian Navy, is Chairman of Local Board of Administration of the school.

== Campus ==
Sainik School Satara is located in the city of Satara on the Pune-Bangalore Highway.

=== Facilities ===
The school has well equipped class rooms, laboratories, Art Gallery, Play Ground, Auditorium, Infirmary, Library and Visitor's lounge.

=== Mess ===
The school has a central mess which caters food to all cadets in one sitting. Both vegetarian and non-vegetarian food is available. It is managed by a Mess manager.

=== Cadet Dormitories ===
The school is fully residential. All cadets are accommodated in Dormitories (known as Houses) under direct supervision of Housemasters who act as their guides and guardians. The housemasters are assisted in their job by Matron/Hostel Superintendents who take care of cadets' personal hygiene and comforts.

== Admissions ==
Admissions are given in Class VI, Class IX and Class XI. Admission for classes VI and IX is carried out on the basis of an entrance exam usually held in January.

- Sale of Admission Form : During the month of October to December
- Last date of Submission of Admission form : First week of December
- Date of Entrance exam : First Sunday of January

== N.C.C. ==
N.C.C. is an integral part of students' life in Sainik School Satara. The School has an Independent Company of Junior and Senior Division N.C.C. as integral part. N.C.C. unit of school comprises all the three wings of defence services i.e. the Army, Navy and Air Force.

== Alumni ==
Sainik School Satara has produced numerous stalwarts in various fields like bureaucrats, doctors, Actors, engineers, journalists, entrepreneurs, business leaders along with numerous military leaders. The students of Sainik School Satara are also known as AJINKYANS. This is because of the famous fort of Ajinkyatara in the City of Satara. The school annual magazine published every year is also titled as AJINKYATARA.

NOTABLE ALUMNI:

- Mukul S. Anand
- Vice Admiral SV Bhokare
- Sudhir Gadgil
- Air Chief Marshal (Retd.) Pradeep Vasant Naik
- Lt Gen (Retd.) Rajendra Ramrao Nimbhorkar
- Rakesh Roshan
- Lt Gen (Retd.) Pradeep Chandran Nair
