= Mini Vasudevan =

Indian animal rights activist

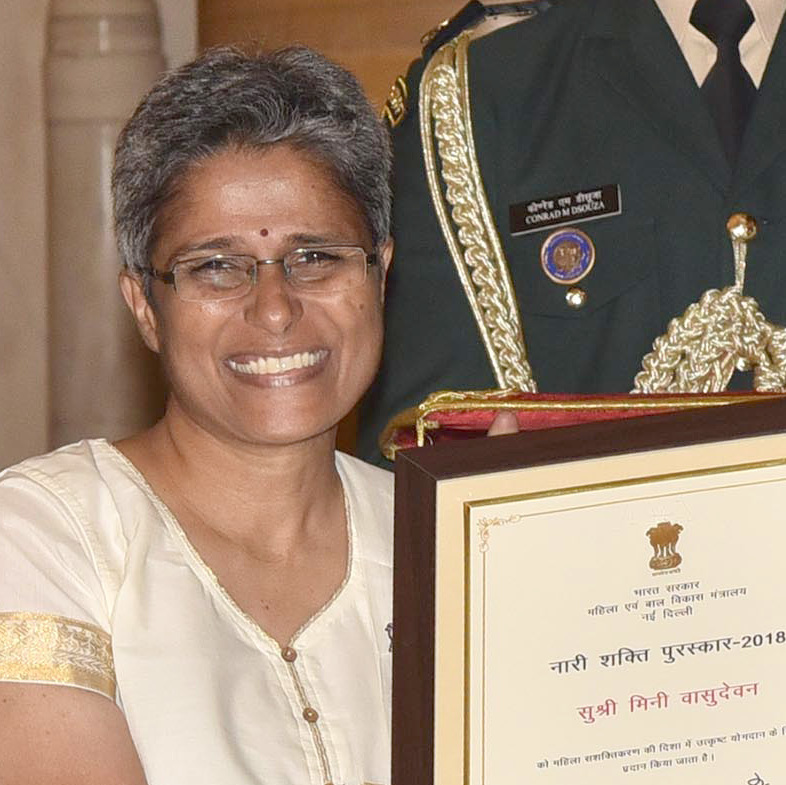
- Mini Vasudevan receiving the Nari Shakti Puraskar in 2019.
- Born: c. 1965
- Education: Graduate engineer
- Known for: Animal rights in Coimbatore
- Spouse: Madhu Ganesh

Mini Vasudevan (born c. 1965) is an Indian animal rights activist based in Coimbatore. She was awarded the Nari Shakti Puraskar in 2019.

== Life ==
Vasudevan was born in about 1965. She was bought up without pets but at the age of eleven she saw a chicken being killed and decided that she would become a vegetarian. She graduated from the College of Engineering. She is an engineer and she and her husband worked in America for thirteen years.

Mini Vasudevan is an alumnus of Sainik School, Kazhakootam 1982 batch.

In 2004 Vasudevan, now a vegan, and her husband, Madhu Ganesh, returned from America to live in Coimbatore. She was appalled to see wounded and diseased street dogs wandering through the town. She had owned animals before and she felt sure that something could and should be done. She would pay veterinarians to help some of the wounded, and sometimes pregnant, animals, but some vets wouldn't treat street dogs and even when they were treated then there was nowhere for the animals to recuperate. In response, she and her husband started the Humane Animal Society in 2006. She had corresponded with Maneka Gandhi about the treatment of street dogs and Gandhi had initially dismissed her as an ex-pat trying to impose her views on a country she no longer lived in. When Gandhi realised that Vasudevan was based in Coimbatore then she advised that Vasudevan should create the solution.

She became involved in capturing and then sterilising street dogs in Coimbatore. In 2019 she had three dogs of her own and the Humane Animal Society employed seventeen people.

In 2019 she was chosen by the Ministry of Women and Child Development to receive the Nari Shakti Puraskar which is the highest award in India for women. She was surprised by the phone call the month before and she had to go to New Delhi for the ceremony.
