= Vivekanand Sinha =

Indian police chief

Vivekanand Sinha IPS
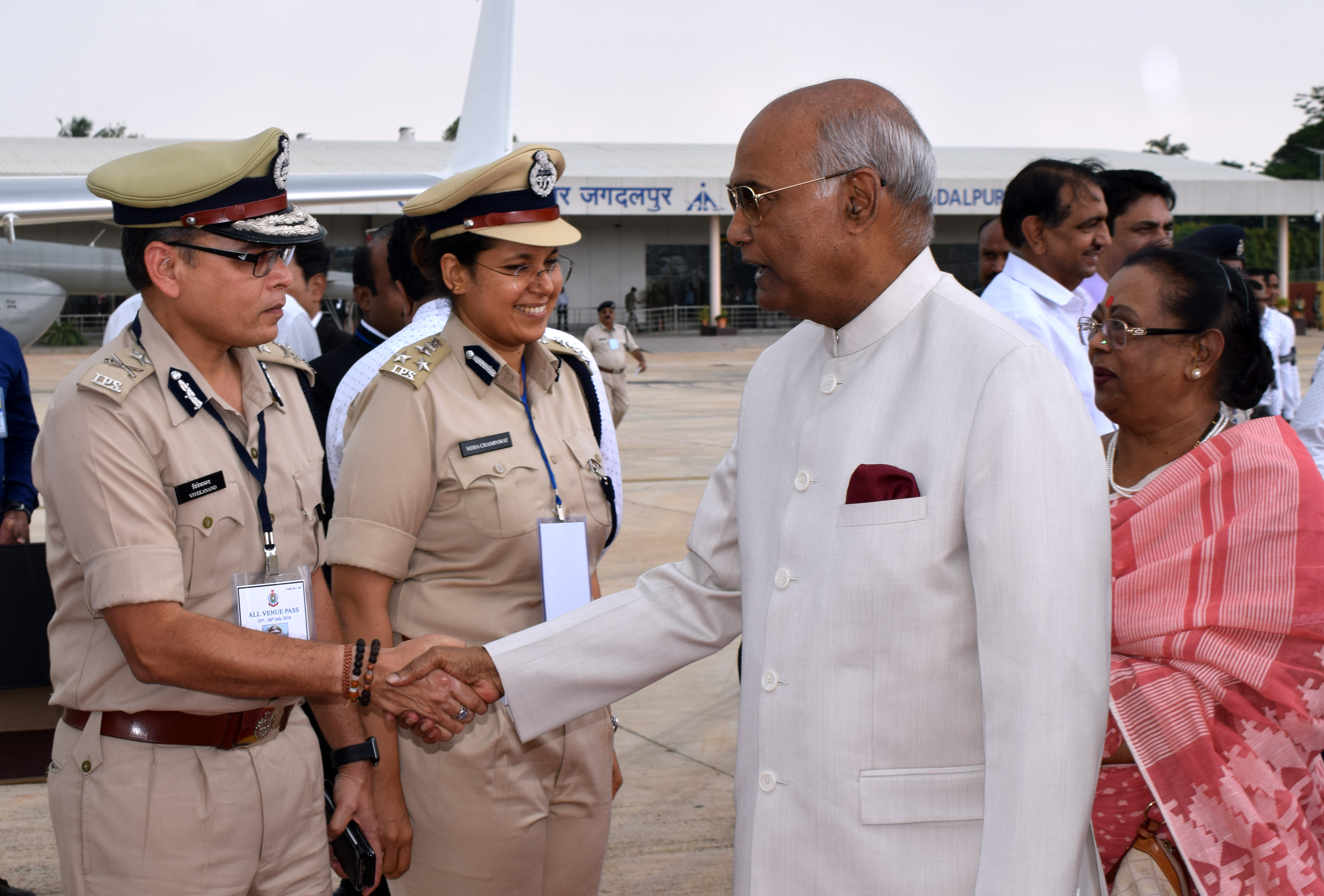
- Sinha with President Ram Nath Kovind
- Born: 16 January 1972 (age 54) Samastipur, Bihar, India
- Education: M.A., MPhil (history)
- Alma mater: Sainik School Purulia, University of Delhi
- Occupation: Inspector General of Police
- Years active: 1996–present
- Employer(s): Indian Police Service, IPS, Government of India
- Spouse: Dr. Smita
- Children: Mayank, Priyank
- Parents: J. P. Sinha (father); Kamla Sinha (mother)

Vivekanand Sinha (born 16 January 1972) is the Inspector General of Police of the Durg range of Chhattisgarh. He has previously served as the Inspector General of Police of Bastar region of Chhattisgarh. He has been an IPS since 1996. He was appointed as the head of the Special Investigation Team (SIT) for the investigation of Jhiram Valley Attack by government of Chhattisgarh on 2 January 2019. The Jhiram Valley Attack was a naxal attack which killed top Congress leaders of Chhattisgarh in 2013 during a political rally in Darbha. The new SIT has been formed by the newly elected Congress government of Chhattisgarh to probe into it He has also served as the DIG of Special Protection Group which looks after the security of the Prime Minister of India. During his tenure as IG in Bilaspur, Sinha walked on coal barefoot to convince the locals that there is no magic in walking on coal. This was done to strengthen the human rights of women who were being harassed or boycotted after being labelled as witches.

In his tenure, two police stations in the Bastar region have received ISO certificates. Owing to the conflicts in the region, Sinha worked to change the perception of citizens towards the security forces in the area.

== Early life ==
He completed his schooling from Sainik School, Purulia. He has a graduation degree from Ramjas College and an MPhil in history from University of Delhi. He joined the Indian Police Services in 1996.

== Career ==
Sinha got Madhya Pradesh cadre and chose Chhattisgarh cadre in 2000 when the new state of Chhattisgarh was formed. He served as SP of Dantewada, Rajnandgaon and Bilaspur districts. He also served as the DIG of the Special Protection Group (SPG) which looks after the security of the Prime Minister of India. Sinha was appointed as the Inspector General of Police to Bastar in April 2017.

== Personal life ==
He was born in Bihar's Samastipur to J. P. Sinha and Kamla Sinha. He completed his schooling from Sainik School, Purulia. He is presently the IGP of Bastar Range Police, Chhattisgarh. He is married to Dr. Smita. She is a Chhattisgarh-based doctor. They have two children.

== SIT on Jhiram Valley ==
Jhiram Valley Attack was a naxal attack which killed many top leaders of Congress including Mahendra Karma, Vidya Charan Shukla and Nand Kumar Patel. The Chhattisgarh Government formed a SIT to probe into it and Vivekanand Sinha was appointed its chief on 2 January 2019. The formation of SIT was one of the several issues which Congress had promised in its Manifesto for 2018 Chhattisgarh Vidhan Sabha elections.
