= Avijit Misra =

Indian Army officer (born 1962)

- Born: 3 April 1962 (age 64); Coochbehar India
- Education: Sainik School purulia National Defence Academy; Indian Military Academy
- Military career
- Allegiance: India
- Branch: Indian Army
- Rank: Colonel
- Unit: Rajput Regiment
- Commands: CO of 26 Rajput

Avijit Misra (born 3 April 1962) is an Indian Army colonel from Pandapara, Kalibari, Jalpaiguri, West Bengal. In April 2012, he shot to national limelight in India when the Kolkata bench of the Armed Forces Tribunal acquitted him of all charges earlier decided by a general court martial in 2006. The Armed Forces Tribunal, Kolkata Bench, also ordered that Misra be reinstated. An officer of 26 Rajput Regiment, Colonel Misra was fired from service and sent to one year rigorous imprisonment for the crime—blowing the whistle over problems in the unit, while he was posted at the sensitive Zimithang sector, Arunachal Pradesh, on the Sino-Indian border in 2003.

== Early life and education ==
Avijit Misra comes from Pandapara in Jalpaiguri district in the Indian state of West Bengal. He was born in Cooch Behar. His father Prakash Chandra Misra was a central government gazetted officer in Customs and Central Excise. Misra was educated at Sainik School Purulia.

== Military career ==
Misra was commissioned into the 16th Battalion of the Rajput Regiment in 1982. He is a graduate of Defence Services Staff College at Wellington and a post-graduate in Defence & Strategic Studies from Chennai University. He has served in Sikkim, J&K and Arunachal Pradesh and fought in counter-insurgency operations in J&K and North East. He has excelled in professional courses, being awarded A/Instructor's grading.

During his career, he served in various positions:

- General Staff Officer - 1 (Operations) of first Armoured Division
- General Staff Officer - 1 (Intelligence) at Fort William.
- Instructor in Infantry School, MHOW Instructor Class 'B' in Anti Tank Guided Missile Group and Tactics Wing

== Honours and awards ==
Awarded Chief of Army Staff Commendation Card for Gallantry in 1997.

== Role as whistleblower and general court martial ==
On being promoted to colonel, Misra commanded the 26 RAJPUT in Operation PARAKRAM in the Western theatre and in the Zimithang Sector in Arunachal Pradesh. This included the sensitive Namkha Chu valley that triggered the 1962 Sino-Indian conflict.

On inducting with his battalion at Zimithang in 2003, Colonel Misra, as the Commanding Officer of the 26 RAJPUT, noticed several aspects that impacted operational and administrative imperatives of his battalion, so he decided to raise his concerns with his brigade headquarters. These issues pertained to crumbling defences; the poor state of habitat of his troops; deficiency of mechanical transport affecting operational efficiency; excessive commitment of battalion manpower on sundry guards and duties which negated his capacity to maintain mandated operational reserves; supply of inferior quality of ration to his men besides, deduction of troops' ration at the Supply Depot and continual demand on regimental and public funds of his battalion, etc. To address these issues on priority, he commenced writing to his immediate superior, not realizing that doing his duty would lead to a court martial.

A general court martial was conducted wherein false complaints were lodged against him through a subordinate of his, which eventually led to his court martial in 2005. Col. Avijit Misra was not allowed to defend himself against these charges on purpose, and at the end of a speedy trial was convicted and sentenced to be cashiered and suffer one year of rigorous imprisonment. On being released from prison in 2006, desolate and penniless, he took it upon himself to fight for his honour. In 2007, he met the noted human rights activist and lawyer Ms Maitrayee Trivedi Dasgupta, who took up his cause pro bono.

== Acquittal by Armed Forces Tribunal and reinstatement as colonel ==
The case created national media attention, and in a landmark judgement, the Kolkata Bench of the Armed Forces Tribunal overturned the verdict of the court martial and ruled on 17 April 2012 that Col. Avijit Misra stood honourably acquitted of all charges and would be reinstated in service with all consequential benefits.

The Armed Forces Tribunal gave the Army 90 days to implement its order. The jail term and court martial record was to be removed from his service history. However, the Ministry of Defence challenged the AFT's order in the Supreme Court in 2012. After a few hearings, the case was finally disposed of by the Supreme Court on 27 April 2016. However, Col Misra would have been due for superannuation on April 30, 2016, had he been in service. Therefore, the case presented a curious challenge for the Army Headquarter.
