= G. K. B. Nair =

Brigadier G.K.B. Nair
- Died: 4 June 2012; Chennai
- Education: National Defence Academy (India), Sainik School, Kazhakootam
- Military career
- Allegiance: Republic of India
- Branch: Indian Army
- Service years: 1971 - 2007
- Rank: Brigadier
- Nickname: KGB
- Conflicts: Indian Mission in Afghanistan

Brigadier G. K. B. Nair was an Indian Army officer from Military Intelligence, who set up the Indian mission in Afghanistan after the fall of the Taliban, and was known by the nickname KGB. He was an alumnus of Sainik School, Kazhakootam and the National Defence Academy.
