= Sainik School, Purulia =

Sainik School Purulia

Location
- Purulia; India; 23.3571502°N 86.3399321°E

Information
- Type: Public boarding school Run by the Ministry of Defence, India
- Motto: Knowledge Through Discipline
- Established: 29 January 1962; 64 years ago
- Founder: Col. S. Mazumdar
- Principal: Gp. Capt. Rajneesh Kumar
- Sr. Master: Prasenjit Ghorai
- Staff: 35
- Faculty: 12
- Grades: Class 6 – 12
- Gender: Boys & Girls(only 10 seats till now)
- Age: 11 to 17.5
- Enrollment: Around 550
- Campus size: 314-acre (1.27 km^{2})
- Campus type: Residential Public School
- School fees: Approx. ₹ 1.6 lakh per annum
- Affiliations: Central Board of Secondary Education
- Website: sainikschoolpurulia.com

Sainik School, Purulia is a public Residential school established by the Sainik Schools Society in 1962, at Purulia, near Manguria in Purulia district, West Bengal India. The school prepares its students for the officers cadre in the Armed Forces and for other professions.

== Background ==
Sainik School, Purulia is a residential school providing public school education, established on 29 January 1962. The school started to function at Bongabari, near Chharra in Purulia District.

== Campus ==
The Sainik School campus is located away from hustle & bustle of the city life on an area of about 280 acre on Purulia-Ranchi road. Sainik School Purulia is well connected with the different parts of the country both by Rail & Road. The school is 5 km from Purulia Bus Stand and 8 km from Purulia Junction railway station. The school has a helipad of its own.

== Extracurricular activities ==
Clubs for the students include English, Bengali, Hindi, Literary & Editorial club, Physics, Chemistry, Maths, Biology, Computers, Geography, Social Service, Library, Art, Craft, Dramatics & music, Astronomy, Photography, Nature Study, Yoga etc.

== Admission ==
Boys are admitted to Class Six and Nine. An All India Sainik Schools Entrance Exam is held annually, usually in February. There is a 25% quota for defence candidates, and 15% and 7.5% respectively to SC and ST candidates. 33% may come from other states than West Bengal. The school terms are from 1 April to 31 March.

== Vacations ==
Cadets are provided with 70 days official vacations.

== Scholarship ==
The State Government awards few scholarships on merit-cum-means basis. In the case of those getting a full scholarship, fees in full, together with clothing and money are paid by the Government. However, the parents' income criteria are very stringent and very few people actually qualify for those slabs. For many students, particularly from other states, there is no scholarship available. Ministry of defence provides scholarship to the wards of serving/ retired JCOs and NCOs. In addition to it, all the cadets are also provided Central assistance

== Management ==
The Sainik Schools are managed by a society named Sainik School Society which is registered under the Societies Registration Act (XXI of 1860). A board of governors that functions under the chairmanship of the defence minister, is the chief executive body of the Sainik Schools Society. The board of governors meets at least once a year. The school has a local board of administration for overseeing the functioning of the school and its finances.

The chief minister or the education minister of the state are among the members of the board of governors. An officer of the Ministry of Defence is nominated to supervise and co-ordinate the functioning of the school and functions as the honorary secretary of the Sainik Schools Society. The honorary secretary is assisted by officers and staff of the Ministry of Defence. This includes two inspecting officers of the rank of colonel or equivalent.

== Notable people ==
The first principal was Lt. Col. S Mazumdar. Col Pala Ram was a legendary headmaster during the mid-1990s. Some of the renowned teachers include Mr. Tarapada Das, (Late) Mr. Dilip Kumar Sinha, Mr. Ajit Kumar Saha and Mr. Bir Bhanu Giri, all awarded President of India National Award for Teachers (India). Among the alumni many have done work of national and international importance. Mr. S.B. Ganguly is the first winner of the SSP SWIFT Teaching Excellence Award. Murli Manohar Kumar is the first Joydeep Chatterjee Scholar, an award started in the memory of Late Capt Chatterjee by alumni from different batches. Abhishek Kumar Roy is the first Priyanath Mukhopadhyay Scholar. Shubham Kumar Singh is the first winner of Lt (IN) Deb Shankar Mitra Scholarship, an award started in the memory of Late Lt Deb Shankar Mitra. Divyajeet Chaudhary and Abhijeet Sadhu are the inaugural winners of Class of 1993 scholarship for the best all rounder in class XI and XII respectively.

Lt Gen Subrata Saha, PVSM UYSM YSM VSM** of the 1974 batch, rose to become the Deputy Chief of Army Staff. He is the first from the School to achieve the Lt Gen rank. He has the distinction of being GOC 15 Corps in Kashmir. He was successful in executing the brilliant rescue and relief operations during the floods in Kashmir 2014 and the much acclaimed security during the Assembly Elections 2014. He is the only Indian Army Officer to have attended and topped Staff College Camberley UK and the US Army War College.

Late Cadet Amit Raj sacrificed his own life while saving the lives of 3 kids was a tenth class student of Sainik School, Purulia and he belonged to Nalanda district of Bihar.

Alumni	Notability
Vivekanand Sinha, IPS	Inspector General of Police of Bastar, Chhattisgarh
Air Chief Marshal Arup Raha, PVSM, AVSM, VM, ADC	21st Chief of Air Staff of Indian Air Force.
Neiphiu Rio	Member of Parliament (Lok Sabha) from Nagaland constituency. Three term Chief Minister of Nagaland
Gopal Gurung	Member of Parliament, from Gelegphu constituency, Bhutan
Arindam Mitra, PhD	Principal at Deloitte, Economist, Transfer Pricing Expert
Lieutenant General Subrata Saha, YSM, VSM**	GOC of 15 Corps, Attained the Flag rank
Major General Kuldip Singh, VSM**	First Addl. Director General of NCC Directorate, Uttarakhand. Served as the second-in-command of the Republic Day parade and Army Day parade in 2009, 2010, 2011
Lieutenant General Laiphrakpam Nishikanta (LN) Singh, VSM**	Awarded Vishisht Seva Medal twice in 2002 and 2009 Attained the Flag rank
Rear Admiral (retd.) Samir Chakravorty, VSM	Attained the Flag rank
Ambuj Singh, PhD	Professor of Computer Science & Biomolecular Science and Engineering, UC Santa Barbara President and CEO, Acelot
Capt (now retired Col) Subir Kumar Mookerjee, SC	Shaurya Chakra for Gallantry
2/Lt (now Colonel) Krishna Murari Singh, SC	Shaurya Chakra for Gallantry
Colonel Debasish Das, SM	Sena Medal for Distinguished service
Colonel Avijit Misra	CO of 26 Rajput, noted Whistleblower
Captain Ashim Kumar Majhi, NM	Nau Sena Medal for Distinguished service
Wg Cdr Priyanath Mukhopadhyay	CO of No. 5 Squadron IAF, sacrificed his life in the line of duty in a Jaguar crash in Jan 2003.
Cdr (Retd) Sukanta Dasgupta	Noted artist and pioneer of Papier Colles technique Sr Assoc Professor at Tolani Institute.
Commandant Yatindra Nath Rai, CRPF	President of India Police Medal for Gallantry during 2002 Raghunath temple attacks
Major Sudip Majee, SM	Sena Medal for Gallantry
Sqn Ldr (Retd) Prajesh Banerjee	Author, Kargil War Hero
Lt (IN) Deb Shankar Mitra	Sacrificed his life in the line of duty in a Seaking crash in Jan 1986
Capt Joydeep Chatterjee	Sacrificed his life in the line of duty in Dec 1992
Ashutosh Salil, IAS	SDM Chandrapur, Maharashtra. First IAS Officer to post his assets outside his office
Joy Biswas, IPS	Addl. SP, HQ, North 24-Parganas
Swami Divyanand Teerth	Jagadguru Sankaracharya of Bhanpura
Santosh Kumar, PhD	Computer Scientist, Wireless Sensors Guru

== See also ==
- Education in India
- List of schools in India
- Education in West Bengal
