= Sainik School, Imphal =

Sainik School Imphal
- Imphal, Manipur; India

Information
- Type: Public, Boarding
- Established: 1971
- Administrator: LT COMMANDER Inderjit Yadav
- Principal: Group Captain (IAF) Rajneesh Kumar
- Grades: 6th to 12th
- Gender: CO.ED
- Campus size: 268-acre (1.08 km^{2})
- Affiliation: CBSE
- Website: ssimphal.nic.in

Sainik School Imphal is a residential English medium school established on 7 October 1971 at Imphal, Manipur by Government of India. It is one of the 33 Sainik Schools of India. It is affiliated to Central Board of Secondary Education and is a member of Indian Public Schools Conference (IPSC).

The school mainly prepares boys for entry into the National Defence Academy after completion of studies at senior secondary level.

== Administration ==
The administration of Sainik School is vested in an autonomous body known as Sainik Schools Society under Ministry of Defence, India. Sainik Schools Society is headed by the Board of Governors under the Chairmanship of Raksha Mantri (Union Minister of Defense). The Chief Ministers/Education Ministers of the state where the Sainik School is located, are ex-officio members of the Board of Governors. There is a Local Board of Administration for each school with a senior defense service officer as its chairman.

The General Officer Commanding of 57 Mountain Division is the Chairman of Local Board of Administration of the school.

== Infrastructure ==
Sainik School Imphal is located at Pukhao road which is around 8 kilometres (5.0 mi) from Imphal.

The school has well equipped class rooms, laboratories and Libraries. Smart Class facilities are also provided in senior classes. The school has a central mess which caters food to all the students.

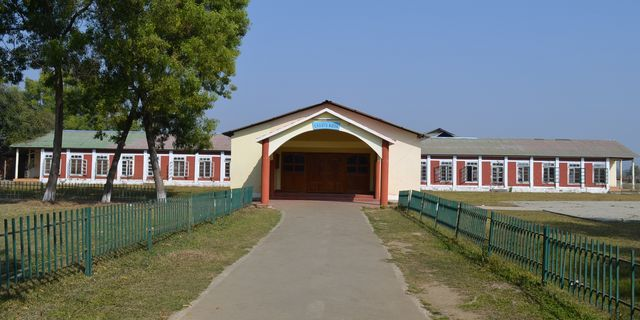
Cadets' Mess

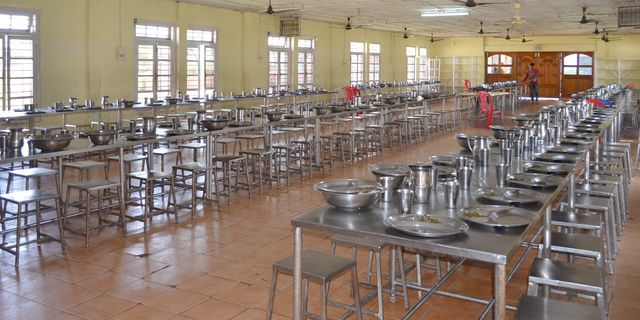
Cadets' Mess

The school is fully residential and has student dormitories.

== Houses ==
There are five houses in the school: Tikendrajit, Netaji, Raman, Shivaji, and Tagore.

== Admissions ==
Admissions are undertaken in Class VI and Class IX. Admission for classes VI and IX is carried out on the basis of an entrance exam usually held in the first Sunday of January every year.

== National Cadet Corps ==
The School has an Independent Company of Junior and Senior Division. The N.C.C. unit of school comprises all the three wings of defence services, the army, the navy and the air force.

== Notable alumni ==
- Thangjam Singh, Indian Footballer who represented MCFC in ISL
- Nongdamba Naorem, Team Member India U-17 World Cup 2017 squad and currently playing for Kerala Blasters in Indian Super League
