= Rajeev Sadanandan =

Rajeev Sadanandan (രാജീവ് സദാനന്ദൻ)
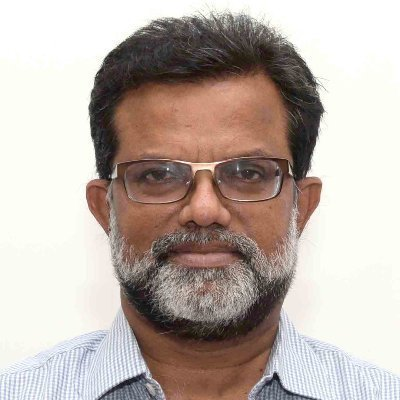
- Born: 28 May 1959 (age 67); Attingal, Kerala, India
- Education: Master of Arts in Applied Economics
- Alma mater: Sainik School Kazhakootam, Jawaharlal Nehru University, Delhi
- Occupation: Civil Servant
- Years active: 1985–present
- Employer: Health Systems Transformation Platform (HSTP)
- Organization(s): Formerly Indian Administrative Service, Health Systems Transformation Platform (HSTP)
- Known for: Public Policy in Healthcare

Rajeev Sadanandan (born 28 May 1959) is a former Indian bureaucrat from the Kerala cadre of the Indian Administrative Service and a healthcare policy-maker. He has been working and researching in the area of health systems, policy and financing for over two decades. He has been involved with the health system of the state of Kerala and has been active in health sector reforms in the state. After serving as the Additional Chief Secretary, Kerala, taking care of the Department of Health and Family Welfare, he took over as the Chief Executive Officer of Health Systems Transformation Platform (HSTP), funded by the Tata Trusts.

== Early life ==
Rajeev Sadanandan did his schooling from Sainik School Kazhakootam, and later went on to do a Master of Arts in English from University of Kerala. Later, he completed his Master of Philosophy in Applied economics from Centre for Development Studies, Thiruvananthapuram.

== Career ==
Rajeev started his bureaucratic career as the Sub-Collector of Kollam. After working in various departments in the Government of Kerala, he served as the District Collector of Malappuram and Thrissur districts during 1994–96. At Malappuram, he piloted a community-based Self-help group program which was aimed at educating and empowering women to improve nutrition, child care, family health and micro-credit societies. This successful pilot—then known as the Malappuram CDS Model—contributed to the launch of state-level Kudumbashree program and the National Rural Livelihood Mission at the national level. Multiple stints in various departments in Kerala followed; he then served as a Consultant with National AIDS Control Organisation, National Programme Officer and National Technical Consultant at UNAIDS' India Country Office. During 2007–2010, Rajeev served as the Chairman of Kerala State Electricity Board. As the head of Rashtriya Swasthya Bima Yojana (2013–15), he revamped various processes to simplify health insurance access for India's poor. While at Ministry of Rural Development, he headed India's rural housing program—Indira Awaas Yojana—and the National Social Assistance Programme (NSAP) aimed at providing financial assistance to the elderly, widows and persons with disabilities in the form of social pensions. Since 2016, Rajeev, as an Additional Chief Secretary, heads Kerala's Department of Health and Family Welfare—his third stint as the head of this department in Kerala, the earlier stints being 1996–2001 and 2011–2013. He played a key role in controlling the situation during 2018 Nipah virus outbreak in Kerala. During the same year, Kerala was hit by unprecedented rains and floods. The health department under Rajeev played a crucial role in tackling the health situation that followed the 2018 Kerala floods.

He has served as one of the Commissioners on the Lancet Global Health Commission on Financing Primary Health Care.

He is currently the CEO of Tata Trust-funded Health Systems Transformation Platform (HSTP). He was recently selected to the Technical Advisory Panel (TAP) of the World Bank's Pandemic Fund.

== Publications ==
1. “Costing of focussed interventions among different sub-populations: A Case Study from South Asia”, UNAIDS, 2000
2. “Government Health Services in Kerala: Who Benefits?”, Economic and Political Weekly, August, 2001
3. “Idle Capacity in Resource Strapped Government Hospitals in Kerala”, Achutha Menon Centre for Health Science Studies, Kerala, 2002 (Co-author)
4. “Global Health Partnerships: Assessing The Evidence For Impact, India Case Study”, DFID Health Resource Centre, London, 2004 ( Co-author)
5. “Rogi Kalyan Samitis: A Case Study on Hospital Reforms from Madhya Pradesh, India” in “Reinventing Public Service Delivery in India: Selected Case Studies” (Chand V ed), SAGE Publications, New Delhi. 2006 (Co-Author)
6. “Practical Guidelines for Intensifying HIV Prevention: Towards Universal Access”, UNAIDS, Geneva, 2007 (Co-Author)
7. “HIV infected and affected”, Seminar, New Delhi, June, 2007
8. “Managing AIDS Control Programmes in India” in “Strategic Issues and Challenges in Health Management” (K. V. Ramani et al ed), SAGE Publications, New Delhi, 2008
9. “Final Evaluation Nepal: October 2007 : International HIV/AIDS workplace education programme : SHARE strategic HIV/AIDS responses by enterprises”, International Labour Organisation, Geneva, 2008
10. “HIV/AIDS in India — The Response of Government Health Services” (Ritu Priya and Shalini Mehta, Vasudhaiva Kutumbakam Pub (P) Ltd, New Delhi, 2008
11. “Health technology assessment in universal health coverage”, Comment in Lancet, Vol 382 December 21/28, 2013 (Co-Author)
12. “Improving quality for maternal care — a case study from Kerala, India” (Co-Author)
13. “India’s Largest Hospital Insurance Program Faces Challenges In Using Claims Data To Measure Quality”, Health Affairs, October, 2016. 35:1792-1799 (Co-Author)
