= Sainik School, Bhubaneswar =

Sainik School Bhubaneswar

Location
- Bhubaneswar, Odisha; India; 20.314672°N 85.842078°E

Information
- Type: Public, Boarding
- Motto: Seva Kartavya Gyan Veerta
- Established: 1962
- Grades: 6th to 12th
- Gender: Boys & Girls Co-Ed
- Campus size: 142-acre (0.57 km^{2})
- Colors: Yellow and green
- Affiliation: CBSE
- Website: Official Website

Sainik School, Bhubaneswar is one of the 33 Sainik Schools in India. It used to be a purely residential school for boys. Admission for Girls have also been started. The medium of instruction is English. Established by Government of India on 1 February 1962 at Bhubaneswar, the Capital City of Odisha. It is affiliated to Central Board of Secondary Education and is a member of Indian Public Schools Conference (IPSC).

The school prepares boys for entry into the National Defence Academy, Khadakwasla, Pune and for other walks of life.

== History ==
Sainik School Bhubaneswar was started by Late Shri Biju Patnaik the then Chief Minister of Orissa on 15 Jan 1962 in an ad hoc government accommodation. The new building and infrastructure was brought up within two years at the present location under personal care of Shri Biju Patnaik and was inaugurated by Pt. Jawaharlal Nehru on 08 Jan 1964.

Sainik School Bhubaneswar is located in the Capital City of Orissa in the close vicinity of Utkal University, Vani Vihar just 2 km away from National Highway. The distance of the school from airport is about 10 km and from railway station only 8 km.

The primary objective of Sainik School is to prepare boys academically, physically and mentally for entry into the National Defence Academy and to attain the high physical, mental and intellectual levels needed for induction into the Officer Cadre. The school has a three tier system of management, consisting of fifty-nine Sainik Schools Society with the Ministry of Defence as its apex body, Local Board of Administration and the School staff. The school staff consists of a principal, Headmaster Registrar, and academic and administrative staff. The motto of this school is 'Seva, Kartavya, Gyan, Veerta' ('सेवा कर्तव्य ज्ञान वीरता'); where seva' means 'service to motherland', 'kartavya' means 'duties', 'Gyan' stands for 'knowledge' and 'Veerta' symbolises 'Bravery'. This school is governed by three officers which are allotted by the Ministry of Defence.

== Campus ==
Sainik School Bhubaneswar is currently at the center of a controversy regarding its potential relocation for a road-widening project. The state government has proposed relocating the school to the outskirts of Bhubaneswar to facilitate the expansion of an existing road. This proposal has faced strong opposition from the school's alumni association and other local bodies who are demanding the plan be withdrawn. A separate issue involves a temporary dumping yard adjacent to the school, which has led to concerns about the environment and living conditions for students and staff.

== Admissions ==
Admissions are given in Class VI, Class IX and Class XI. Admission for classes VI and IX is carried out on the basis of an entrance exam usually held in January.

- Sale of Admission Form : During the month of October to December
- Last date of Submission of Admission form : First week of December
- Date of Entrance exam : First Sunday of January

== N.C.C. ==
N.C.C. is an integral part of students' life in Sainik School Bhubaneswar. The School has an Independent Company of Junior and Senior Division N.C.C. as integral part. N.C.C. unit of school comprises all the three wings of defence services i.e. the Army, Navy and Air Force.
