= Sainik School, Ambikapur =

Sainik School Ambikapur

Location
- Ambikapur, Chhattisgarh; India; 23.0816255°N 83.1002065°E

Information
- Type: Public, Boarding
- Established: 2008
- Principal: Colonel Rajesh Benda
- Grades: 6th to 12th
- Gender: Boys and Girls
- Campus size: 84-acre (0.34 km^{2})
- Affiliation: CBSE
- Website: http://www.sainikschoolambikapur.org.in

Sainik School Ambikapur is one of the 24 Sainik Schools of India. It is a purely residential school for both boys and girls. The medium of instruction is English. Established by Government of India on 1 September 2008 at Ambikapur. It is affiliated to Central Board of Secondary Education and is a member of Indian Public Schools Conference (IPSC).

The school prepares cadets for entry into the National Defence Academy, Khadakwasla, Pune and for other walks of life.

== Administration ==
The administration of Sainik School is vested in an autonomous body known as Sainik Schools Society under Ministry of Defence, India. Sainik Schools Society is headed by the Board of Governors under the Chairmanship of Raksha Mantri (Union Minister of Defense). The Chief Ministers/Education Ministers of the states where the Sainik Schools are located, are members of the Board of Governors. There is a Local Board of Administration for each school with a senior defense service officer as its Chairman.

== Campus ==
Sainik School Ambikapur is currently running in its permanent campus of 84 Acres located at Mendra Kalan.

== N.C.C. ==
N.C.C. is an integral part of students' life in Sainik School Ambikapur. The School has an Independent Company of Junior and Senior Division N.C.C. as integral part. N.C.C. unit of school comprises all the three wings of defence services i.e. the Army, Navy and Air Force.

== See also ==
- Education in India
- Literacy in India
- List of institutions of higher education in Chhattisgarh
- Education in Chhattisgarh
