= Nipah virus outbreaks in Kerala =

Disease outbreaks in Indian state

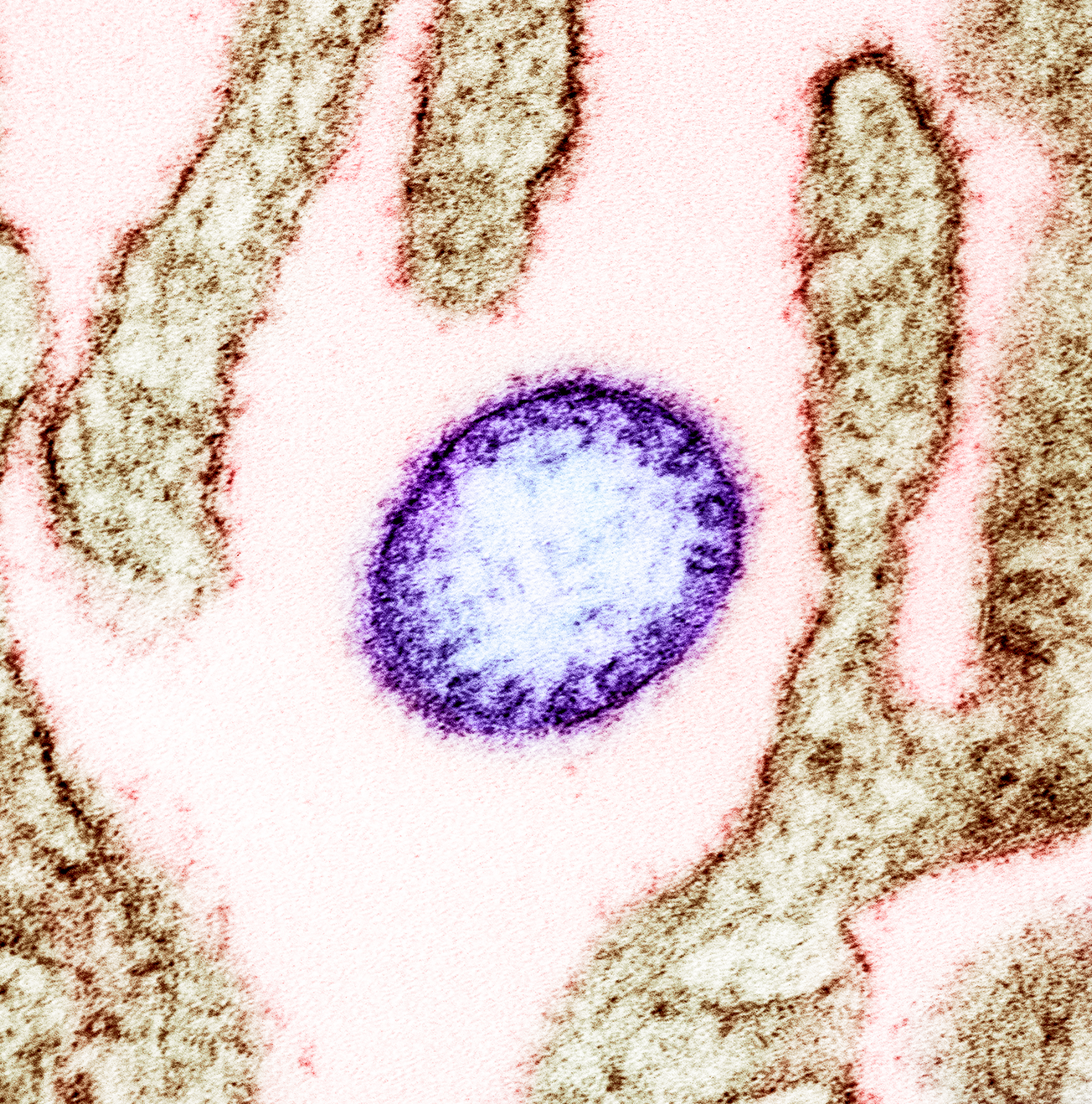
- An electron micrograph of the Nipah virus
- Disease: Nipah virus
- Date: 2018, 2021, 2023, 2024
- Fatality rate: 89.4% (2018)

There have been several outbreaks of Nipah virus in Kerala, some of which have been traced to fruit bats. The NIV Pune confirmed the first case of Nipah virus in Kerala in May 2018. A total of 21 Nipah virus infected individuals died between 2018 and 2024.

== History ==
After Nipah virus outbreaks in India in 2001 and 2007 (both in the eastern state of West Bengal), an outbreak occurred in Kerala in 2018. The 2018 Kerala outbreak was traced to fruit bats in the area, was generally confined to Kozhikode and Malappuram districts, and claimed 17 lives. The outbreak was declared over on 10 Jun 2018. Another outbreak occurred in 2021, but was confined to the village of Pazhur in the Chathamangalam gram panchayat of Kozhikode district. It claimed one life, on 5 Sept 2021. An outbreak began in Kozhikode district in Aug 2023, claiming two lives and infecting four other people by 16 Sept of that year.

== 2018 outbreak ==
The outbreak's index case was reported at a sub-divisional hospital in Perambra, Kozhikode district, on 2 May. The patient was brought to the GMCH Kozhikode for further treatment, but succumbed to the virus. His brother, Mohammed Salih, was admitted to Baby Memorial Hospital in Kozhikode with suspected viral encephalitis. A team of doctors at the hospital suspected Nipah, since his symptoms were similar to those of his brother (who had died by then).

The index patient had passed the virus to 16 people at Medical College Hospital, and two more were later infected. There were 10 deaths in the first week they included nurse Lini Puthussery, who had treated the index patient before diagnosis. The outbreak began in Kozhikode district, later spreading to the adjacent Malappuram district. Health advisories were issued for northern Kerala and the adjoining districts of Karnataka, with two suspected cases detected in Mangalore on 23 May 2018.

Over 2,000 people in Kozhikode and Malappuram districts were quarantined and kept under observation during the outbreak. To fight the infection, M 102.4 (a human monoclonal antibody undergoing clinical trials) was imported from Australia. This was facilitated by Nipah researcher Christopher Broder.

After the index patient died, 16 other affected patients succumbed to the disease; two recovered fully. The outbreak was declared over on 10 June 2018.

=== Virology and epidemiology ===
Presence of the virus in patients was confirmed with RT-PCR tests conducted at the Manipal Institute of Virology and the National Virology Institute in Pune. Although the first set of samples did not detect the virus in bats, later tests indicated that fruit bats in the area were the source of the virus.

=== Response ===
On 23 May 2018, the Kerala Health Department issued an advisory asking travelers to northern Kerala to be cautious. Two days later, the Ministry of Health and Prevention of the United Arab Emirates advised postponing unnecessary travel to Kerala and avoiding its fruits and vegetables until the situation was under control.

On 30 May 2018, construction began on the Institute of Advanced Virology, Kerala, in response to the outbreak. Two days later, the Thamarassery diocese in northern Kerala urged churches to stop placing communion on the tongue, postpone religious classes and avoid weddings, family gatherings and unnecessary travel until the viral spread was contained.

=== Recognition ===
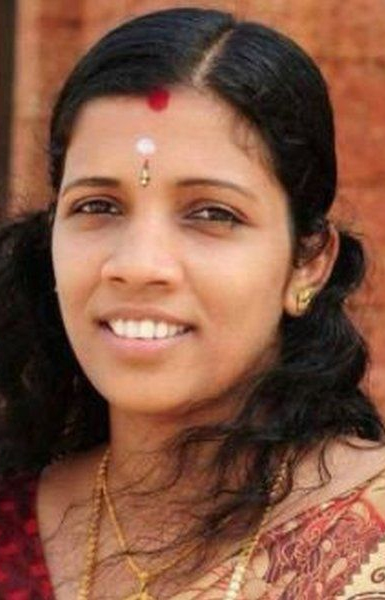
Nurse Lini Puthussery, who treated the first victim, died in Kozhikode.

Kerala's efforts to contain the outbreak under health minister K. K. Shailaja, health secretary Rajeev Sadanandan and the district collector were praised by many, including the Kerala High Court and Robert Gallo of the Institute of Human Virology in Baltimore.

Lini Puthussery, a 28-year-old nurse at the Perambra Taluk hospital who died of the virus, was called a hero by doctors and on social media. A note she had written to her husband, Sajish, was circulated on social media. The Kerala Government Hospital Development Society (KGHDS) employees' union instituted an award in Puthussery's name to an outstanding person in the sector. The Best Nurse in Public Service Award was instituted in memory of Puthussery. Jim Campbell, director of the health workforce of the World Health Organisation, tweeted: "Remember them, lest we forget: Razan al-Najjar (Gaza); Lini Puthusserry (India), Salome Karwah (Liberia)".

== 2019 incident ==
A 23-year-old student was diagnosed on 4 June 2019 in Kochi. Over 300 people were put under observation, but no further cases were reported. The student later recovered. This is the fourth outbreak reported in India, with previous outbreaks in 2001 (45 deaths), 2007 (five deaths), and 2018 (17 deaths).

== 2021 outbreak ==
The 2021 outbreak began with the death of a 12-year-old boy in Pazhur, Kozhikode district, on 5 September. The outbreak was localized in the village, which is in the Chathamangalam gram panchayat of the district, and claimed one life. This was Kerala's third Nipah virus outbreak, following outbreaks in 2018 and 2019. The central government rushed a team from the National Centre for Disease Control to the state to provide technical support. Relatives of the dead boy and those involved in his treatment were placed under quarantine.

2021 outbreak in Kozhikode, with a three-kilometer buffer zone around the epicentre

The index case of the outbreak was reported at a private hospital in Kozhikode district on 5 September, when a 12-year-old boy from Chathamangalam died after testing positive for Nipah virus infection. The new Nipah infection, which spreads through the saliva of fruit bats, came three years after a previous outbreak which claimed 17 lives. The presence of Nipah virus in the boy was confirmed by RT-PCR tests, and all three samples (plasma, serum and CSF) were found to be positive in tests at the National Institute of Virology in Pune.

== 2023 outbreak ==
Six cases and two deaths were reported in August and September 2023. One of the victims died on 30 August and the other died in early September, both in Kozhikode district. Two family members of a victim tested positive and were hospitalized.

Indian Health Minister Mansukh Mandaviya announced that the central government had dispatched a team of experts to Kerala to assess the situation and help the state government manage the outbreak. Kerala Health Minister Veena George reported that tests had confirmed that the virus strain in the outbreak was identical to one previously found in Bangladesh, and teams from the National Institute of Virology in Pune had established a mobile laboratory at Kozhikode Medical College for virus testing and bat surveys. George said that 168 contacts of the two deceased patients were identified and underwent virus testing. The state government established a control room in Kozhikode for continuous monitoring, and health workers were instructed to adhere strictly to infection-control protocols. Seven villages in Kozhikode were declared as containment zones, and some schools and offices in the district were temporarily closed. Kerala Chief Minister Pinarayi Vijayan said that the state government treated the deaths seriously, and urged the public to wear face masks and visit hospitals only for emergencies.

== 2024 incidents ==
A 14-year-old boy from Pandikkad, Malappuram district died on 21 July 2024 at GMCH Kozhikode. He had exposure to hog plum fruit, although it was not certain if this was the vehicle that exposed him to the virus, and fruit bat activity existed in the area. The boy had initially been admitted to a hospital in Perinthalmanna for acute encephalitis. He was unable to receive a monoclonal antibody treatment because of his deteriorating condition by the time it arrived. One more death was reported in Malappuram district during the month of September 2024. The person was a 24-year-old student who had come there from Bangalore.

== 2025 incident ==
As of early June 2025, at least 425 people have been placed under observation in Kerala amid a renewed Nipah virus scare. The districts of Palakkad, Malappuram, and Kozhikode have been put on high alert. In Palakkad, 61 of the 110 contacts identified are health workers; similarly, all 87 identified in Kozhikode are medical personnel. The Health Minister has advised psychological support for those under surveillance. A teenage girl from Makkaraparamba, Malappuram, succumbed to the virus on June 1, while a 38-year-old woman from Thachanattukara, Palakkad, remains critical at Moulana Hospital in Perinthalmanna. Health authorities continue to intensify containment efforts to prevent further spread.

== In popular culture ==
Virus, a 2019 Indian Malayalam medical thriller film co-produced and directed by Aashiq Abu and released on 7 June 2019, was based on the 2018 outbreak.

The visual artist Pallavi Paul‘s video tryptich titled ALAQ deals with the 2019 outbreak of Nipah virus in Kerala and is featured in the 2025/26 Kochi-Muziris Biennale (Aspinwall House). https://artandaustralia.com/60_2/p352/pallavi-paul
