= Sainik Schools =

System of schools in India

The Sainik Schools (transl. Military Schools) are a system of Military high schools in India established and managed by the Sainik Schools Society (transl. Military Schools Society) under Ministry of Defence (MoD). They were conceived in 1961 by V. K. Krishna Menon, the then Defence Minister of India, to rectify the regional and class imbalance amongst the officer cadre of the Indian Military. The primary objective of the Sainik Schools is to prepare students academically, mentally and physically for entry into the National Defence Academy (NDA) and Indian Naval Academy (INA). Sainik Schools, along with 1 RIMC and 5 RMS (Rashtriya Military Schools), contribute 25% to 30% officer cadets to NDA and INA. As of 2021, there were 33 Sainik Schools, and MoD will establish 100 more boarding Sainik Schools in Public-Private Partnership (PPP) mode.

MoD run Sainik Schools as joint venture with the respective state governments. MoD provides annual funding, and serving officers on deputation to school. State governments provide the land, infrastructure, and other teaching and administrative employees.

Sainik Schools follow the "CBSE Plus" by using CBSE curriculum while additionally aiming to prepare children for entry into NDA and INA. Admission to Sainik Schools is granted at class VI and class IX. The reservation policy caters for SC/ST, domicile of the respective states and the wards of Armed Forces employees and ex-servicemen.

== History ==
The inspiration for setting up the Sainik Schools came from the Royal Indian Military College (RIMC) and Royal Indian Military Schools (now called Rashtriya Military School or RMS) which have given India many service chiefs. 1 RIMC and 5 RMS were established by the government after the World War I to Indianise the British Colonial Military in India by providing western style education with the aim to prepare the potential pool of future military officers. RIMC was established in 1922. Five RMS were established, namely Chail Military School in 1922, Ajmer Military School in 1930, Belgaum Military School in 1945, Bangalore Military School in 1946 and Dholpur Military School in 1962. First Sainik School came up in 1961. Additionally, there are several private military schools, Maharashtra has highest number of those. Oldest private military school is Bhonsala Military School, which was established in 1937.

Although Sainik School, Lucknow, established in 1960 was the first Sainik School, is not under the Sainik School Society, but rather under Uttar Pradesh Sainik Schools Society, which is registered under the Indian Societies Registration Act (1860).

In 2008, in his Union Budget the Finance minister, P Chidambaram, allocated ₹2 crore to each of the 25 Sainik schools, to counter rising attrition in the defence forces, especially at the officer level.

Sainik schools are ordinary citizen's public school where deserving students get high-quality education irrespective of their income or class background. Seats are reserved for children of SC/ST and serving/retired defence personnel.

The objective of the Sainik Schools is to prepare the students to lead as officers in the Defence Services of the country. The schools select bright and promising students through an All India Sainik Schools Entrance Exam (AISSEE) and focus on moulding their overall personality with emphasis on extracurricular activities.

Sainik schools resources allow cadets to develop their skills in sports, academics and other extracurricular activities. Infrastructure in Sainik Schools include running tracks, cross-country tracks, indoor games, parade grounds, boxing rings, firing ranges, canoeing clubs, horse riding clubs, mountaineering clubs, trekking and hiking club, obstacles courses, football, hockey and cricket fields, as well as volleyball and basketball courts. Cadets also become a part of NCC. A cadet who completes their 12th standard usually possess a NCC B certificate.

Cadets are assigned to houses. They are classified as sub-juniors, juniors and seniors respectively depending upon their class of study. Cadets compete in sports, physical training, academics, cross country, drill and various other competitions to win their house trophy.

== Sainik Schools Society ==
The Sainik Schools Society (transl. Military Schools Society) is an organisation under the Ministry of Defence. The Chief Executive Body of the Sainik Schools Society is a Board of Governors functioning under the Chairmanship of the Defence Minister. For exercising closer control and supervision over the affairs of Sainik Schools there is an executive committee under the Chairmanship of Defence Secretary. The day-to-day work of the Society is managed by JS (Trg) & Hony Secretary who is assisted by Inspecting Officers, DS (Trg), Under Secretary, Sainik Schools Society (Sainik School Cell). The staff for the cell is provided by the MoD. The local administration of the school is looked after by a Local Board of Administration whose chairman is the GoC-in-C of the concerned Command where the Sainik School is located.

== List of Sainik Schools ==
The Sainik schools across the country are:

No	State	Location	Established date
1	Andhra Pradesh	Korukonda	18-Jan-1962
2	Andhra Pradesh	Kalikiri	20-Aug-2014
3	Arunachal Pradesh	East Siang	2018
4	Assam	Goalpara	12-Nov-1964
5	Bihar	Nalanda	12-Oct-2003
6	Bihar	Gopalganj	12-Oct-2003
7	Chhattisgarh	Ambikapur	01-Sep-2008
8	Gujarat	Balachadi	08-Jul-1961
9	Haryana	Kunjpura	24-Jul-1961
10	Haryana	Rewari	29-Aug-2009
11	Himachal Pradesh	Sujanpur Tihra	02-Nov-1978
12	Jammu & Kashmir	Nagrota	22-Aug-1970
13	Jharkhand	Tilaiya	16-Sep-1963
14	Karnataka	Bijapur	16-Sep-1963
15	Karnataka	Kodagu	18-Oct-2007
16	Kerala	Kazhakootam	26-Jan-1962
17	Madhya Pradesh	Morena	2025
18	Madhya Pradesh	Rewa	20-Jul-1962
19	Maharashtra	Satara	23-June-1961
20	Maharashtra	Chandrapur	2019
21	Manipur	Imphal	07-Oct-1971
22	Mizoram	Chhingchhip	21 April 2017
23	Nagaland	Punglwa	02-Apr-2007
24	Odisha	Bhubaneswar	01-Feb-1962
25	Odisha	Sambalpur	2020
26	Punjab	Kapurthala	08-Jul-1961
27	Rajasthan	Chittorgarh	07-Aug-1961
28	Rajasthan	Jhunjhunu	13-Dec-2012
29	Tamil Nadu	Amaravathinagar	16-Jul-1962
30	Uttarakhand	Ghorakhal	21-Mar-1966
31	Uttar Pradesh	Jhansi	02-Aug-2019
32	Uttar Pradesh	Mainpuri	2019
33	Uttar Pradesh	Amethi	2020
34	Uttar Pradesh	Gorakhpur	2020
35	West Bengal	Purulia	29-Jan-1962

=== Sainik School, Manasbal ===
It is the second Sainik School in Jammu and Kashmir, the first being in Nagrota. The school was established by the Sainik Schools Society and founded by then-Chief Minister of Jammu and Kashmir Sheikh Abdullah in 1980. The school started on September 14, 1981. The first principal was Wing Commander J. K. Gandhi.

The school comes under the control of Government of Jammu and Kashmir, supported by the Ministry of Defence. J&K Sainik School Manasbal is the second Sainik School which runs under state government, rest all of such schools are managed by the Indian Ministry of Defence. Initially, the Principals for this school were being deputed from the Army Education Corps, but since 1995 the school is managed by civil officials deputed by the Department of School Education. On 26 July 2023, School Education Department, J&K, appointed Lt. Col. Gh Hassan Nath (Retd.) as Principal of the School.

== See also ==
- Cadet college, similar military educational institutions system in other nations.
- National Cadet Corps (India) (NCC)
- National Police Cadet Corps (NPCC)
- National Service Scheme (NSS)
- Rashtriya Indian Military College (RIMC)
- Rashtriya Military Schools (RMS)
