= Sainik School, Goalpara =

Coordinates: 26°5′21″N 90°44′15″E

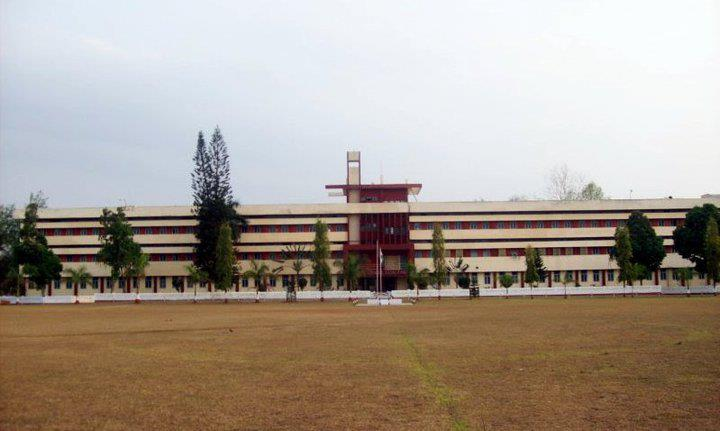
- Sainik School, Goalpara, Assam
- Goalpara, Assam; India

Information
- Type: Sainik School
- Motto: Everything Is Achievable
- Established: 12 November 1964
- Grades: Class VI up to XII
- Gender: Co-Education
- Age range: 10 to 18
- Campus: Rural
- Houses: Abhimanyu, Bhaskar, Aniruddha, Chilarai, Lachit, Lohit, Udaygiri, Ekalavya and Chandraprabha(Girls Hostel for new entrants)
- Affiliations: Central Board of Secondary Education
- Website: sainikschoolgoalpara.org

Sainik School Goalpara, Assam, India, was established on 12 November 1964, under the Sainik Schools Society, New Delhi under the Ministry of Defence (India). The idea of Sainik schools were presented by the then Defence Minister V.K.Menon in 1961. The school was established in the town of Goalpara which is a district headquarter. Subsequently, the school was shifted to its present location at Rajapara Village in Mornai in Goalpara District. Initially 18 Sainik schools were founded throughout India.

Sainik School Goalpara celebrated its Golden Jubilee on 12 Nov 2014. It was a year-long celebration, celebrated with the involvement of its Old Boys Association (OBA).

The school is located in the north-eastern part of India. Sainik school Goalpara is extended in almost 509 acres (206 ha). In this north eastern region of India, there are two more Sainik Schools, one at Imphal, Manipur and the other one at Punglwa in Nagaland. The school is situated 18 km from Goalpara town en route capital Guwahati. The nearest police station is Mornoi and railway station is Goalpara. It is a fully residential school having classes from standard 6th to 12th. Besides the school there is a kindergarten school.

Admission to the school is done for two standards - 6th and 9th. The average strength of each class is 90. The aim of the school is to prepare students for the National Defence Academy exam. Till date more than 200 students have joined NDA and around 500 joined the armed forces through other exams like CDS.

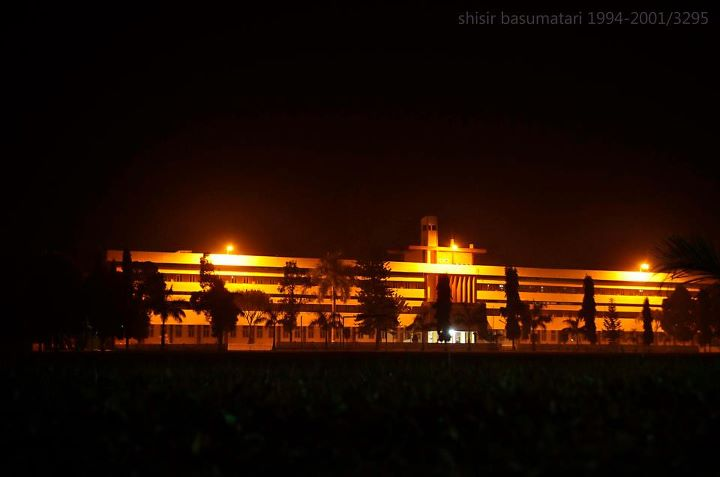
Sainik School, Goalpara, at Night

== House system ==
There are nine houses for accommodation. These are divided into two groups- junior, senior. Class VI and VII are juniors. Class VIII to XII are seniors. 2 junior, and 6 senior Houses and in addition one girls house. Names of the houses are 1. Senior House - Udaygiri, Lohit, Lachit, Chilarai, Aniruddha and Eklavya. 2. Junior House - Bhaskar and Abhimanyu. 3. Girls House - Chandraparabha.

== Junior Houses ==
- Abhimanyu House is named after Arjun's son Abhimanyu, accommodating Class VI and VII.
- Bhaskar House is named after the sun and accommodates Class VI and VII students.

== Senior Houses ==
- Anirudhha House is named after Lord Krishna's Grandson Aniruddha and it accommodates VIII to XII boys.
- Eklavya House is named after a young prince of the Nishadha and accommodates class VIII to XII boys.
- Chilarai House is named after a General of Nara Narayan who was known for his swiftness and his birthday is celebrated as Chilarai Diwas in Assam. It previously was a senior house but in 2018 it made as a junior house. It accommodates class VIII to XII boys.
- Udaygiri House is named after an imaginary hill and accommodates class VIII to XII boys. The house has been retaining the inter-house cross-country trophy for 40 years.
- Lohit House is named after the Brahmaputra which is the lifeline of Assam and accommodates class VIII to XII boys.
- Lachit House is named after a Ahom general Lachit Borphukan and accommodates class VIII to XII boys.
- 3 Junior Houses Anirudha House, Eklavya House and Chilarai House again set as senior Houses in 2023.

In addition to 8 houses, 1 more house is added for girls in 2022 named as Chandraprabha House.

Besides these eight houses there is a mess and auditorium. The school building is in two parts- the Main building and the Science Block. The main block is a 3-story building having classes for class VI to X. All offices of the school are situated in this block. Science block has classrooms for class XI-XII. The block has science laboratories.

== House Days ==
House Days are the major events for the cadets. House Days are celebrated because their house was inaugurated. On house day there is a feast organised by the cadets and every teacher of the school is invited. The houses are painted and lighted by the cadets only. There are programmes like a cultural Show followed by some games.

House Days:

- Udaygiri House on 5 September
- Lohit House on 5 September
- Lachit House on 13 November
- Chilarai House on 13 November
- Anniruddha House on 13 August
- Eklavya House on 13 November

== Structure ==
Sainik Schools have three officers from the defence forces. They are Principal, Headmaster and Registrar.

- The Principal is appointed by the Ministry of Defence. The duration of the principal's tenure is not fixed but is generally 2–3 years.
- The Vice Principal is the head of academic affairs. There are around 50 teaching staff along with 35 subordinates. There is a Senior Master whose work is to manage all academic activities and act as a liaison between teachers and Headmaster.
- The Admin officer is chief of all activities except academics. He is responsible for the infrastructure development of the school.

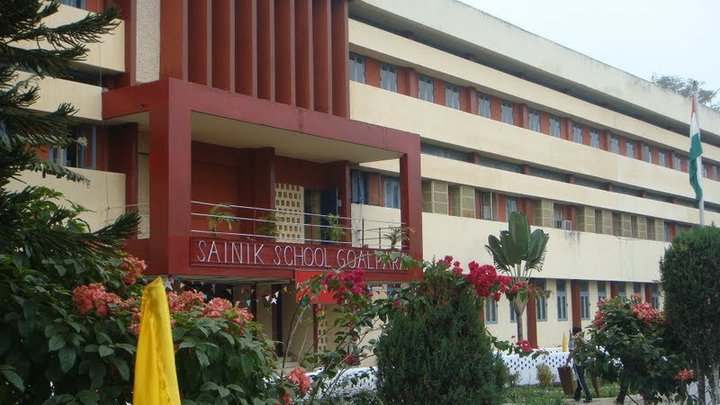
Side view

== Activities ==
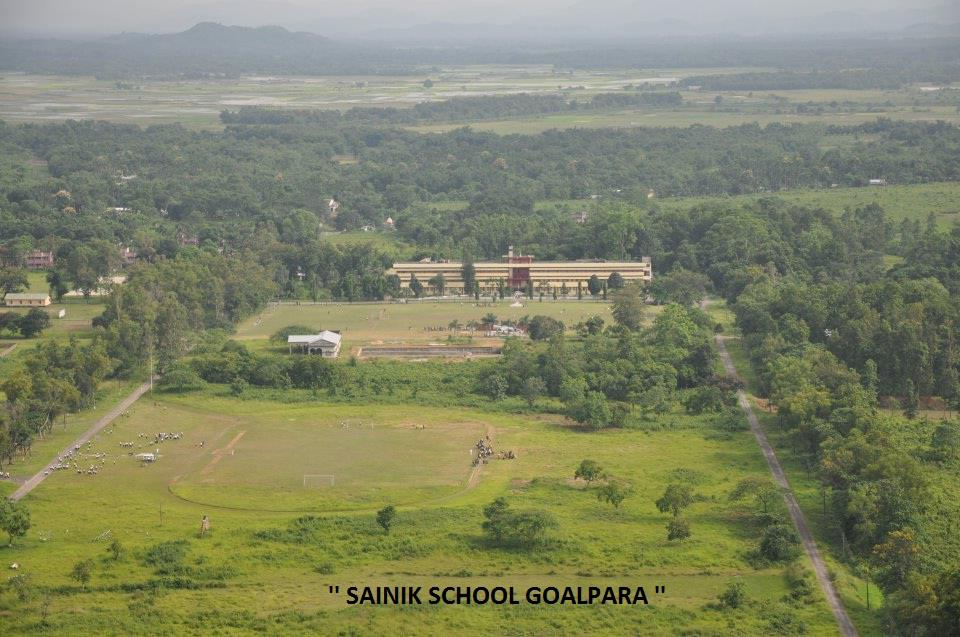
School

=== Sporting activities ===
There are sports grounds inside the school campus. There are five football fields, eight basketball courts, six volleyball courts, two lawn tennis courts, two cricket grounds, four handball grounds; besides these there is an eight-lane 400-meter track for athletics which includes venues for other track and field events like high jump, triple jump, long jump, disc throw, shot put throw, javelin throw, and pole-vault. The annual sports meet is held in December in which the best house for athletics meet is judged on the basis of all track and field events. School also is equipped with the best-designed swimming pool.

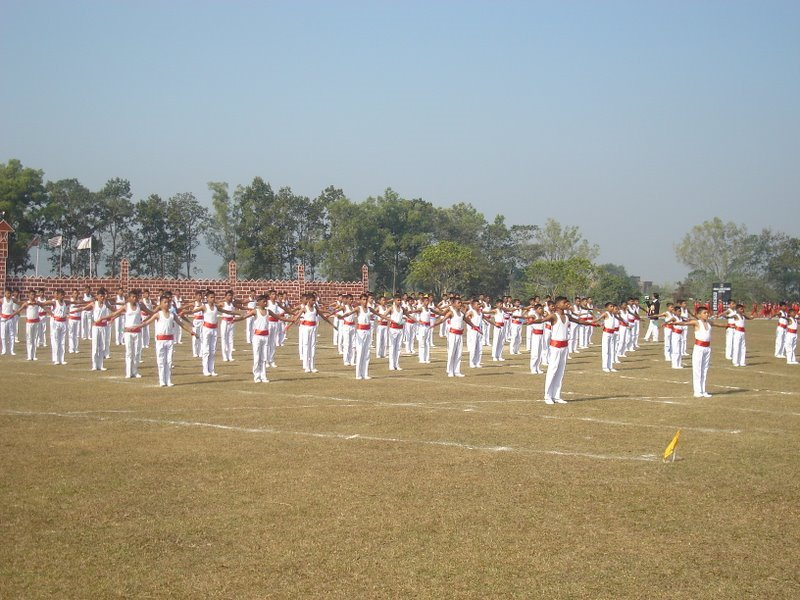
PT display

In each session, activities are organised. Each sport has a championship and the winner is called the champion of that sport. A trophy is given to each champion at the Annual Prize Distribution ceremony being held before winter break.

- Newly Added Activities from session 2023-24
- Boxing Competition
- Horse Riding

=== Academic events ===
Events like debate, extempore, recitation, general knowledge quiz, and essay writing are organised in three languages - English, Hindi, Assamese at each three levels - senior, junior, sub-junior.

=== Other events ===
- Cross Country Running
- Obstacles competition
- Drills competition
- Mass PT competition

== National Cadet Corps ==
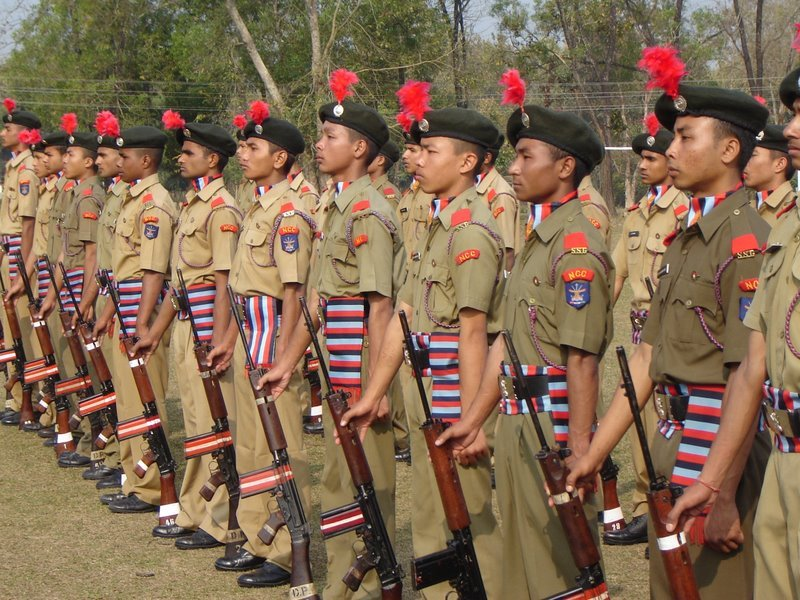
Rifle drill

Sainik School Goalpara has a wing of the NCC. The 27th Company of the NCC is located inside the school premises to train the cadets. Each Friday afternoon there are NCC classes for 90 minutes. The school participates in the Republic Day Parade, New Delhi. The cadets receive an NCC 'A' certificate after class X and NCC 'B'certificate after class XII.

== Admissions ==
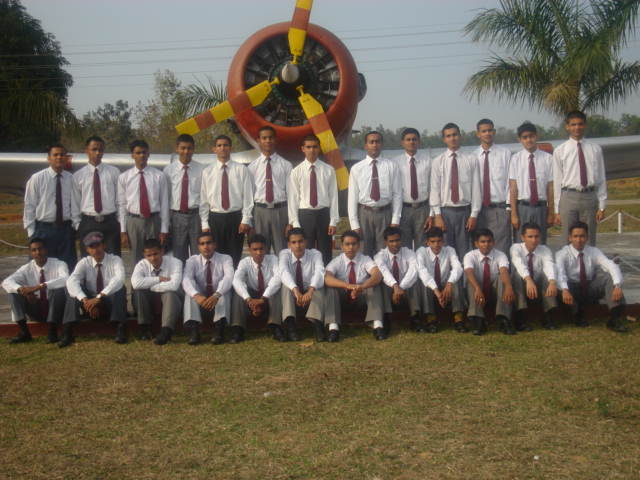
Cadets in mufti

Boys are admitted to class VI and IX, between the ages of 10–11 years for class VI and 13–14 years for class IX as of 2 July of the year of admission. Admission is through the All India Entrance Examination which is held in the third week of January. This is followed by an interview and medical examination in April/May.

Boys selected are called for admission in June.
