= Kappazhom Raman Pillai =

Indian Superintendent of Police

Kappazhom Raman Pillai was from Nair community who served as the Dewan Peshkar of the Government of Travancore. As Dewan Peishcar, he held the powers of the Collector, the Magistrate and the Superintendent of Police.

== Interests ==
Using 'Angadan' as his pseudonym, he published seven articles in the Malayala Manorama.

== Career ==
Kappazhom began his career as a teacher. Later he was elevated to important posts like Registration Director and Dewan Peishcar.

Swadeshabhimani Ramakrishna Pillai criticised him for maintaining a good relationship with T Sankaran Thampi, the Palace Manager and right-hand man of Mulam Thirunal Rama Varma.

== Commemoration ==
On 25 November 2012 Princess Aswathi Thirunal Gowri Lakshmi Bayi inaugurated a function held to celebrate the 144th birth anniversary of Kappazhom Raman Pillai.
