= Sainik School, Kunjpura =

Location
- Kunjpura, Haryana; India; 29°43′41″N 77°03′29″E

Information
- Type: Sainik School
- Motto: सिद्धिम् सन्नद्ध ('Ready to Accomplish')
- Established: 24 July 1961
- School district: Karnal district
- Principal: Cpt.(IN) Gurbir singh
- Staff: 40
- Faculty: 40
- Enrollment: 620 in classes VI to XII
- Campus: 276 acres (1.12 km^{2})
- Affiliation: Central Board of Secondary Education, New Delhi
- Website: sskunjpura.org

Sainik School, Kunjpura in the state of Haryana, one of the first five Sainik Schools (military school) established in 1961 in India, is jointly operated by the Government of Haryana state and GoI's Ministry of Defence. It aims to prepare students for entry into the National Defence Academy (NDA). More than 800 students from the school have qualified for the National Defence Academy (NDA). A record 16 students qualified for joining the NDA in 2006 through the written examination conducted by UPSC and the subsequent interview conducted by SSB and the number has increased to 33 in 2020.

From 2021, admission for girl student was allowed for the first time, 10% seats were reserved for the girls and 10 girls were given admission based on the National Testing Agency.

The cadets of this school are known as "Kunjeans".

== Location ==
Situated west of Kunjpura village, 6 km (3.7 mi) east of NH44 (historic Grand Trunk Road) bypassing Karnal city of Haryana, the school stands on a 275 acres (1.11 km^{2}) campus and is 10 km (6.2 mi) northeast of Karnal city and 130 km (81 mi) north of Delhi.

== History ==
The school was started in July 1961 on the large property that originally belonged to the last Nawab of Kunjpura, Ibrahim Ali Khan, who had built it in the year 1900 to house the marriage party of his daughter. The property passed into the hands of the Defence Ministry as the nawab migrated to Pakistan after the independence of India and died in Lahore in 1952. Before becoming the Sainik School, it was also the 'sanctum sanctorum' of the prestigious 'Punjab Police Academy'.

Sainik School, Kunjpura came into being in July 1961, at the behest of V. K. Krishna Menon, the then Defence Minister of India, who took personal interest in its inception. He handed over command of the school to Lt. Col. E J Simeon (1918–2007), a Corps of Signals officer stationed in Delhi at the time, who ran the school for the next seven years as its founder principal until his retirement from the army in 1967. He was succeeded by Col. Munindra Chandra as the Principal, whose contribution in sending a record number of cadets from the 1969 and 1970 batches of the NDA, subsequent principals were Group Captain Suresh Kumar, Col Arun Datta, Group Captain L.N.Sharma (now Air Vice Marshal L.N. Sharma AVSM (Retd.)), Col. YS Parmar, SM; Col V.D. Chandola (Retd.), Col Vijay Rana and now, Captain (IN) Gurbir Singh, who is the present principal of the school.

== Overview ==
Gradually, additions were made to the main building of the school in terms of new constructions. But the main building remained the ‘nerve centre’ of the school.

In addition to the main building, the school has an NDA block (which serves as the new academic block), cadets Mess, the Manekshaw Auditorium, the Simeon Squash Court, gymnasium, riding school, swimming pool, athletics and sports fields, infirmary and residential areas for the staff and the boys. The Main Building houses the Administrative block, Office of the Principal, conference hall, library and sub-junior classes. The NDA block is the Academic block, housing the staff room, computer lab, lecture hall and multimedia room. The school also has a synthetic tennis court, several basketball, volleyball, football and hockey courts and grounds. Training of National Cadet Corps (NCC) is compulsory for all the boys of the school and they receive 'B' certificate in NCC before passing out from the school.

The school is a ‘Dronacharya's Gurukul’ in the true sense of the word as it provides opportunities for growth and development in each and every segment of a student's life, may it be academics, co-curricular activities, extra-curricular activities or career guidance, thus helping in the students' all round development.

== Other sainik school in Haryana ==
- Sainik School, Rewari, the second sainik school in Haryana became functional in 2009.
- Sainik School, Matanhail at Matanhail in Jhajjar district was announced by the Haryana govt in 2018. Foundation stone was laid in 2003 by the then Defence Minister George Fernandez, but no progress was made. In 2018, with the efforts of Haryana Finance Minister, Captain Abhimanyu, the BJP govt of Haryana agreed to provide funds and 100 acres (40 ha) of land in Matanhail and Rudiyawas villages for the establishment of this school. With this Haryana will be only state in India with 3 sainik schools. In 1983, panchayat had given 312 acres (126 ha) of land for the Sainik school and this land's ownership was legally transferred to the school in 2002. However, forests dept raised the objection that the land belongs to forests dept and no construction can be undertaken on forests land. Consequently, in July 2021 the panchayat gave another 61 acres (25 ha) land for the sainik school, which forests dept has confirmed does not belong to forests and the construction can proceed. Earlier, Haryana govt had allocated INR 50 crore for the construction of sainik school. Now, the construction can finally proceed.

== See also ==
- Indian Naval Academy
- List of institutions of higher education in Haryana
