= Sainik School, Gopalganj =

Public school, Ministry of Defence, India, School in India

Sainik School Gopalganj
- Sipaya Tola, Gopalganj; India

Information
- Type: Public school Boarding School Ministry Of Defence, India
- Motto: विद्या ददाति विनयम (Knowledge gives humility.)
- Established: 12th October 2003
- Founder: Lt. Col. N.S. Sidhu
- Principal: Wg Cdr Aditi Ghosh (Offg.)
- Staff: Academic & Administrative
- Grades: Class VI to XII
- Gender: Boys and Girls
- Age: 10 to 18
- Enrollment: 455
- Campus: 81.10-acre (0.3282 km^{2})
- Houses: Gandhara, Takshashila, Vaishali, Vikramshila
- Colours: Silver and maroon
- Nickname: Aryans
- Affiliation: Central Board of Secondary Education, India
- Alumni: ssgj.free.nf
- Website: ssgopalganj.in

Sainik School, Gopalganj is a Sainik School established by the Sainik Schools Society in 2003. It is located near Gopalganj, Bihar, in the Sipaya village., at an altitude of about 30 metres (98 ft) above sea level, 8 km (5.0 mi) from Kuchaikote in Gopalganj district of the state of Bihar, India. Affiliated to CBSE with Affiliation No.: 380003, and School No.: 65126. The School will celebrate its 24th Raising Day on 12th Oct 2026.

== Location ==
Sainik School Gopalganj is located in Tola Sipaya, Kuchaikote Block, Gopalganj District in Bihar, India with Pin Code: 841501.

== Introduction ==
The school is one among the 33 Sainik Schools under the aegis of the Sainik School Society, Ministry of Defence, Government of India. The school was established on 12 October 2003.

== School emblem ==
The school insignia consists of the three services’ elements: the crossed swords of the Army, the golden eagle of the Air Force, and the anchor of the Navy. The main aim of the school is to train cadets to join the defence services. The school motto ‘Vidya Dadati Vinayam’ has been taken from the sixth verse of the preface of the Sanskrit text ‘Hitopadesha’ and means ‘The knowledge gives humility’.

== History ==
Sainik School, Gopalganj was established on 12 October 2003. The school was built on the eight-acre Hathua Estate of the then Hathua Maharaj, near Mirganj in Gopalganj District. It is one of the two Sainik Schools that started on the same day in Bihar (20th in sequence). The school started with 55 students in 2003. The First batch is known as The Pioneers. The Second batch of 2004-2011 is known as The Valiants. The Third batch (2005-2012) set a record with 100% results in Class 12. The Fourth batch of 2006-2013 is known as The Game Changers.The Alumni has its presence in all domains of UPSC, BPSC, IITs, NITs, IIMs, AIIMS, State Medical Colleges, NDA, INA, AFMC, AFA, CTW, CME, MHOW, AIT, JNU, BHU and all State Universities. The school got shifted to its new location in the session 2024-2025.

== Houses ==
All the cadets are assigned houses. The four houses are based on historical locations in Ancient India. These Houses are known as Takshashila (Red), Vikramashila (Green), Gandhara (Blue)(The sky liners), Vaishali (Yellow). Each house is in two groups. The senior house is from class 10 to 12, and the junior house from class 6 to 9; both have a senior House Captain and a House vice-captain. They also have their slogans. The Takshashilians call themselves ‘ The Red Royals’, the Gandharians call themselves ‘The SkyLiners’, the Vaishalians call themselves ‘The Valiants’, and the Vikramshilians call themselves ‘The Victors’.

== Management ==
The Sainik Schools are managed by a Society which is registered under the Societies Registration Act (XXI of 1860). A Board of Governors that functions under the Chairmanship of the Defence Minister is the Chief Executive Body of the Sainik Schools Society. The Board of Governors meets at least once a year. The school has a Local Board of Administration for overseeing the functioning of the school and its finances.

The Chief Minister or the Education Minister of the state is among the members of the Board of Governors. An officer of the Ministry of Defence is nominated to supervise and coordinate the functioning of the school and functions as the Honorary Secretary of the Sainik Schools Society. The Honorary Secretary is assisted by officers and staff of the Ministry of Defence. This includes two inspecting officers of the rank of Colonel or equivalent. The officiating Principal of the school is Wg Cdr Aditi Ghosh, and the Administrative Officer is Maj Ashish Verma.
