= Sainik School, Rewari =

Sainik School
- Soldiers School
- Gothra Tappa Khori, Haryana; India

Information
- Type: Sainik School
- Motto: Gyan Sadbhawna Deshbhakti (Yes, We Can)
- Established: 29 August 2008
- Principal: Col Soumyabrata Dhar
- Staff: 55
- Faculty: 45
- Affiliations: CBSE
- Website: http://www.ssrw.org/

Sainik School Rewari, is located in village of Gothra Tappa Khori of Rewari District of Haryana state, is one of 33 Sainik Schools in India. The Principal is Capt(IN) Brij Kishore, the Vice-Principal is Sqn Ldr Vandana Chaudhary & Adm Officer is Major Jai Singh Rathore.

School is located at Gothara Tappa Khori on NH-11 Rewari-Narnaul highway.

== History ==
On 29th Aug 2008, Defence Minister of India, AK Antony, had inaugurated the school.

In Feb 2020, phase-I construction of the school was complete and Chief Minister of Haryana, Manohar Lal Khattar, approved INR 20.83 crore for the construction of phase-II which includes the internal roads, parking, rainwater harvesting system, boundary wall, street lights and security lights.

In Feb 2021, it as informed the pending minor construction work will be completed by 31 March 2021. Academic block was constructed at the cost of INR13.50 cr, mess block with INR 3 cr, hostel for 570 students with INR 9.15 cr, 12 feet high boundary wall with INR 4 cr, were complete. INR 19 cr tender for construction for roads and parking and other pending was issued on 3 March 2021.

== School information ==
=== Learning outcome ===
Joining NDA is an ambition for most of the students. In Sept 2018, 40 cadets of Sainik School Rewari had passed the NDA written exam and proceeded to SSB Interview phase.

NDA selection is done in two stages: a single competitive examination for all three forces, followed by an interview conducted by the Services Selection Board. An entrance examination is conducted to select students.

== Other sainik schools in Haryana ==
- Sainik School, Kunjpura, first in haryana and among first five sainik schools in india was established in 1961.
- Sainik School, Matanhail at Matanhail in Jhajjar district was announced by the Haryana govt in 2018. Foundation stone was laid in 2003 by the then Defence Minister George Fernandez, but no progress was made. In 2018, with the efforts of Haryana Finance Minister, Captain Abhimanyu, the BJP govt of Haryana agreed to provide funds and 100 acre land in Matanhail and Rudiyawas villages for the establishment of this school. With this Haryana will be only state in India with 3 sainik schools.

== See also ==
- Indian Naval Academy
- List of boarding schools in India
- List of institutions of higher education in Haryana
- Rashtriya Indian Military College
- Sainik schools
