= Sainik School, Jhunjhunu =

Sainik School Jhunjhunu
- Jhunjhunu, Rajasthan; India

Information
- Type: Public school under the Ministry of Defence
- Motto: राष्ट्राय समर्पणम्
- Established: 13 December 2018
- Campus: Rural
- Website: https://ssjhunjhunu.com

Sainik School, Jhunjhunu, established in 2018, is a military school based at Jhunjhunu, Rajasthan, India.

It is one of several Sainik Schools. The school prepares students for entry into the National Defence Academy. The School is affiliated with CBSE.

== School Campus ==
The School allotted 76.132 acres of land near to the village Dorasar to construct its campus. Presently the campus is under construction.

== Affiliation ==
The institution is affiliated to the Central Board of Secondary Education (CBSE), New Delhi.
