= Sainik School, Manasbal =

Jammu and Kashmir Sainik School Manasbal
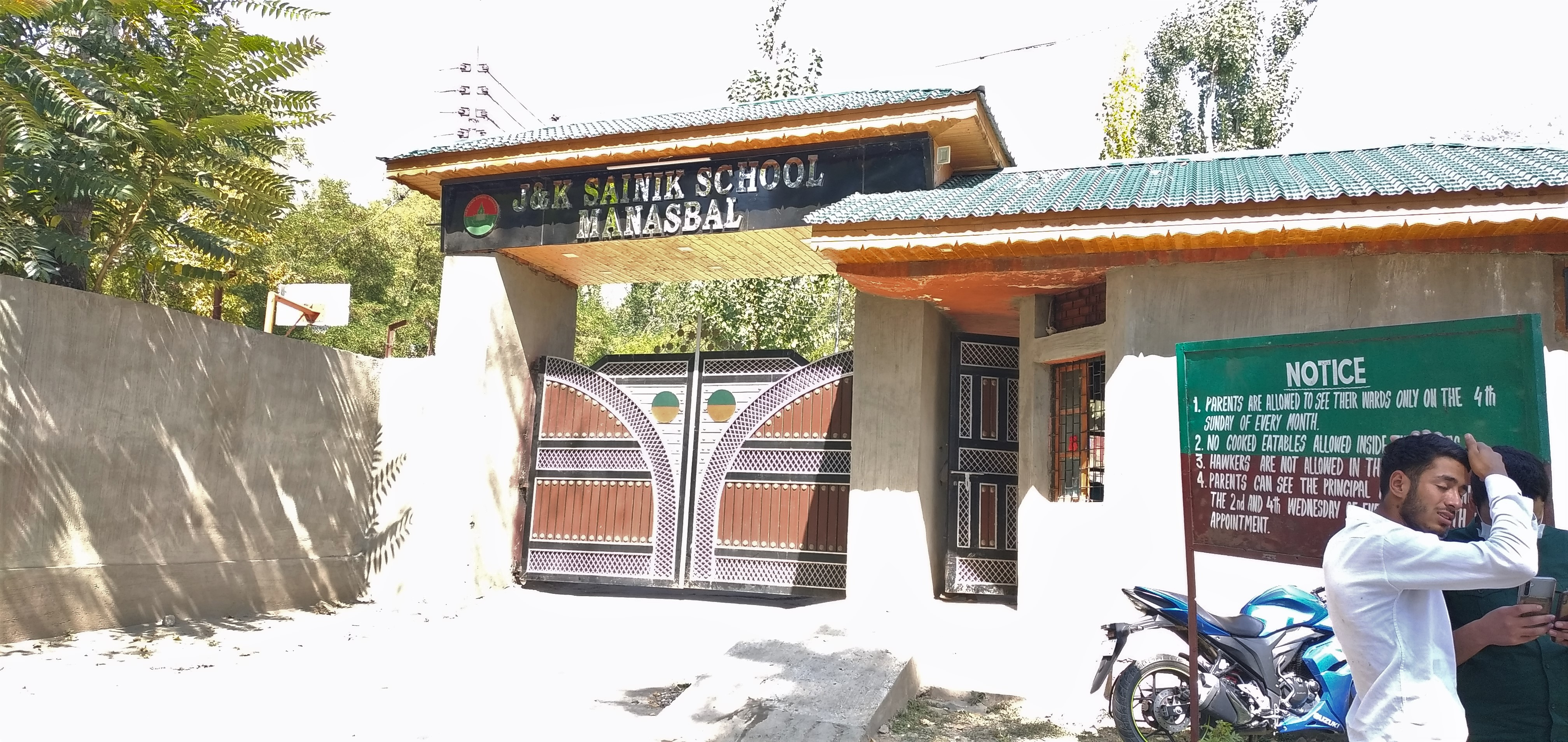

Location
- Manasbal Lake; Ganderbal, Jammu and Kashmir 193504; India; 34°15′3.31″N 74°42′56.02″E

Information
- Type: Public, All-Male Residential
- Motto: Through Toil to the Stars
- Established: 1981; 45 years ago
- Chairman: Lieutenant Governor of Jammu and Kashmir
- Faculty: 100
- Enrollment: 426+ (VI to XII)
- Affiliation: CBSE
- Website: www.jksainikschool.in
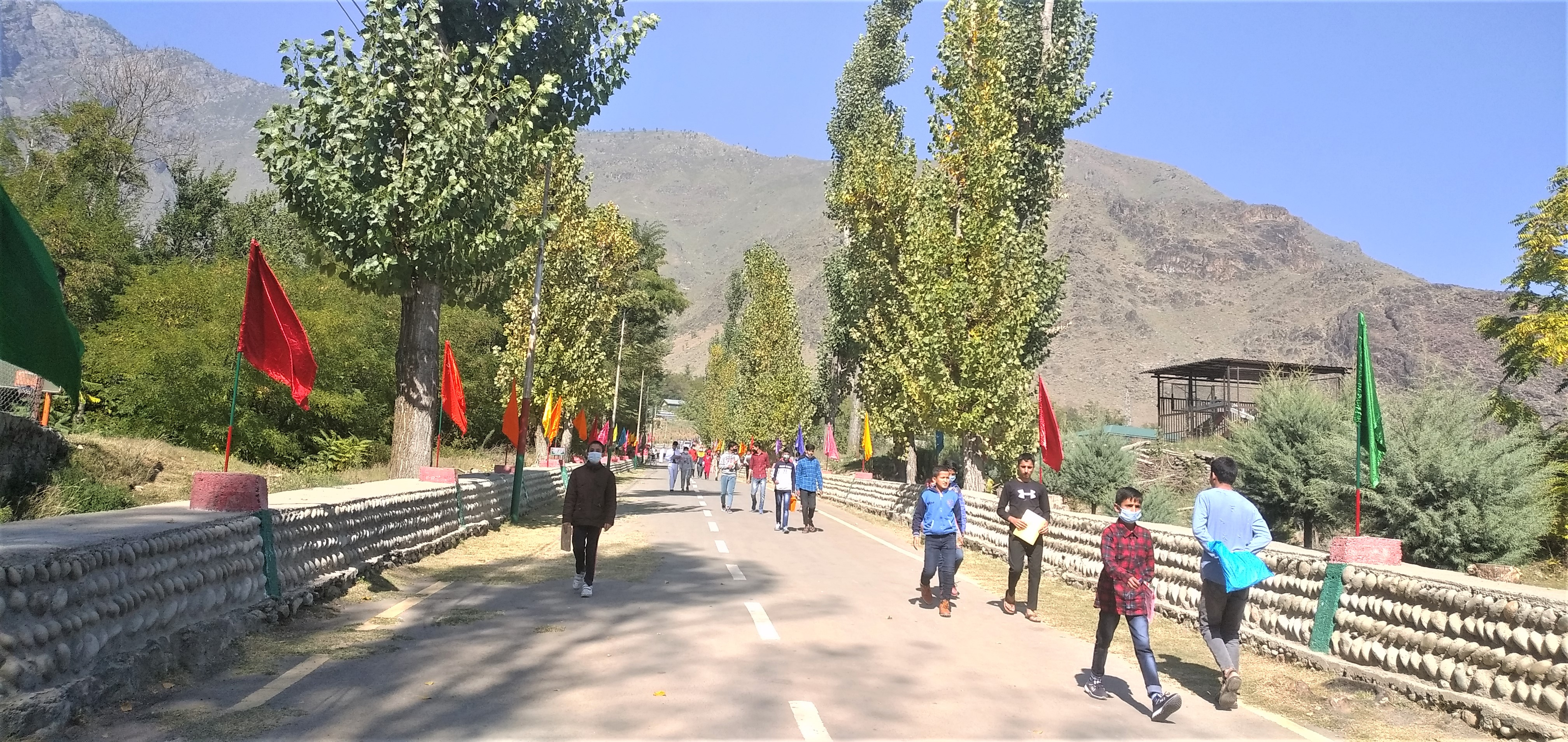

J&K Sainik School Manasbal is located 32 km (20 mi) from Srinagar. It is a military school in Ganderbal district of Jammu and Kashmir, India, preparing students for the National Defence Academy and other allied courses. It is an English-medium school affiliated to the Central Board of Secondary Education in New Delhi. Each year entrance exam is conducted for admission of students to class VI (whole new batch) and class IX (few students selected determined by the already number of students in the class).

It is the second Sainik School in Jammu and Kashmir, the first being in Nagrota. The school was established by the Sainik Schools Society and founded by then-Chief Minister of Jammu and Kashmir Sheikh Abdullah in 1980. The school started on 14 September 1981. The first principal was Wing Commander J. K. Gandhi.

The school comes under the control of Government of Jammu and Kashmir, supported by the Ministry of Defence. J&K Sainik School Manasbal is the second Sainik School which runs under state government, first one is Sainik School Lukhnow, U.P., rest all of such Sainik schools are managed by the Indian Ministry of Defence. Initially, the Principals for this school were being deputed from the Army Education Corps, but since 1995 the school is managed by civil officials deputed by the Department of School Education. On 26 July 2023, School Education Department, J&K, appointed Lt. Col. Gh Hassan Nath (Retd.) as Principal of the School.

Besides a 16-bed sick ward, the school has six hostels to house students. During the winter, from December to March, when the weather conditions in the mountainous location are severe, the education program pauses and students return home to prepare for their final exams held in March.

According to then-Cabinet Minister of Jammu and Kashmir Chowdhary Zulfkar Ali, in 2018 69 students from Kashmir and Ladakh had been selected out of 900 applicants, showing the high demand for the school he said "has carved a niche for itself in academic quality".

In July 2020, the Chief Secretary of the Union Territory of Jammu and Kashmir, B.V.R. Subrahmanyam, approved the budget estimates worth Rs 886.07 lakhs for the financial year 2020–2021, while Kashmir's Department of Floriculture was asked to make the campus eco-friendly. A few months earlier, the Indian Army took steps to improve the empowerment of students, like the dedication of a gym and the implementation of yearly student tours to career institutions.
