= Sainik School, Sujanpur Tihra =

Sainik School Sujanpur Tihra

Location
- Sujanpur Tihra; India; 31.829°N 76.502°E

Information
- Type: Public school Run by the Ministry of Defence (India)
- Motto: Pursuit of Excellence
- Established: 2 November 1978
- Founder: His Excellency, Shri Neelam Sanjeeva Reddy
- Principal: Gp Capt Rachna Joshi
- Headmaster: Cdr Sandeep Singh Virk
- Grades: Class 6 - 12
- Gender: Boys/Girls
- Age: 10 to 18
- Enrollment: 525
- Campus size: 28 acres (Including Chaugan)
- Colour
- Affiliation: CBSE
- Alumni: Sujanians
- Website: www.sainikschoolsujanpurtira.org

Sainik School Sujanpur Tihra is a Sainik School (army school) in the town of Tira Sujanpur, Hamirpur district in the state of Himachal Pradesh, India.

== Overview ==
Sainik Schools were set up on the lines of Public Schools and were designed to cater the needs of the common masses who could not afford to send their wards to elite but expensive public schools. Sainik School Sujanpur Tihra (HP), a purely residential school, was set up to cater to the needs of the people of Himachal Pradesh and was inaugurated by His Excellency Shri Neelam Sanjeeva Reddy, the President of India on 2 November 1978. He said, "A fine Institution. My best wishes for its progress".

Sainik School Sujanpur Tihra is located 24 km from its district HQ Hamirpur and is connected to all other places in the State by road. Its nearest broad gauge railhead is located 99 km away at Una.

The school has a playground. The school has independent NCC unit and NCC is compulsory for all students from VI to XI standards. Sports facilities exist in Football, Hockey, Volleyball, Handball & Basketball besides other minor & indoor games.

The school has three Service Officers i.e. Principal, Head Master and Registrar deputed by Ministry of Defence and 50 experienced set of teaching and administrative staff together with 52 support staff for effective management of school activities. In addition, one JCO and three NCO's from Army are appointed for NCC & Sports activities in the school.

== Admissions ==
Sainik school Sujanpur Tihra admits boys from Classes VI & IX. The age of the applicants should be between 10 and 11 years for class VI and the age should be 13-14 for class IX as on 1 July of the year in which admission is sought.

The candidates applying for the admissions in Sujanpur Tihra need to undergo entrance examination for admission to class VI & IX. The written test is followed by interview. Only those candidates who qualify in the written examination are called for interview keeping in view the number of vacancies available.

The medical test is also conducted and the admission to these classes is subject to the candidates being found medically fit. There are certain medical standards prescribed for entry to National Defence Academy and the candidates need to pass the fitness test. However the administration ignores factors like height and weight which are variable.

== Buildings ==
- Main building(Sudhir Block)

Facing the rectangular ground, is the main academic building which houses both, the primary and the secondary wing. It has three levels. The ground level holds the primary wing (also known as Sainik Primary School) i.e., up to grade 5 and other offices including authorities' offices. The first level consists mostly of classrooms for senior wing. The second level has the library, NCC store, the Biology laboratory and the assembly hall that can accommodate almost over 550 people. Hostel:School has 6 hostels named after rivers flowing in Himachal Pradesh. Every hostel has a Video Room for students. School has Cadets Mess with two blocks named after Field Marshal Cariappa and Field Marshal Manekshaw. School has residential complex for teachers and their families. School has in-house MI Room. School campus has many 5 football grounds, 2 hockey fields, 1 handball grounds, an athletic track, 4 Basketball courts, 1 lawn tennis courts, a squash court and a swimming pool and 4 badminton court. Currently the school building is in dire need of repairs due to successive governments apathy and lack of funds.

== Academics ==
Examinations are conducted at regular intervals to ensure continuous study and also as feed back mechanism on the progress made by the cadets in each subject. The cadets are awarded various torches as recognition to their efforts put in during the entire session as per the following criteria:

- 90% and above : GOLD TORCH
- 85% and above : SILVER TORCH
- 80% and above : BRONZE TORCH
- First in Class : TORCH-FIRST IN CLASS
- Second in Class : TORCH-SECOND IN CLASS

== Extra-curricular activities ==
Science Clubs, Music Club, Literary Club, Photography, G.K Club. Karate club, Trackers, English literature, yoga etc. are functioning at present in the school under the guidance of expert and experienced teachers.

Physical Training, Cross Country and Games-Hockey, Football, Athletics, Basketball, Handball and Volleyball are compulsory for all boys. The school has also introduced an obstacle course. Regularly cultural evenings etc. are organized between the hostels. Water sports, Mountaineering etc. is done on regular intervals.

== Sports ==
The Sainik Schools provides opportunities for the cadets to participate in games in the following categories.

- Seniors : 10th to 12th
- Juniors : 7th to 9th

The games are divided into major and minor events.

- Major Events: Football, Hockey, Volleyball, Basketball, handball and athletic.
- Minor Events: Table-Tennis, squash, Badminton, Lawn Tennis, Mass, P.T, etc.

Participation:

- Sainik school Sujanpur Tihra participates In north zone inter Sainik Schools Competition and in inter zonal sports competition.
- S.S.S.T. also participates in Indian Public school meet.
- C.B.S.E. cluster meet.
- H.P. State tournament.

The school has various indoor and outdoor facilities for the cadets.
