= Indian Public Schools' Conference =

Indian Public Schools Conference was established in 1939. The Indian Public Schools are an independent and private institutions of secondary education. Top notch boarding and day-cum boarding and the Sainik and Military Schools form part of this school conference. Therefore, these schools are considered private schools. These 77 schools have an independent board of governors. Their aim is to facilitate all around development of students through emphasis on both academics and extra-curricular activities.

== Dr. Gaur Hari Singhania IPSC Life Time Achievement Award ==
The award carries cash prize of Rs. 51, 000/-, Silver plaque and a shawl. But the honour extended surpasses all the material accolades. The award is sponsored by J K White Cement Works and L K Singhania Education Centre, Gotan (https://www.lksec.org/).

- R.M. Saran (2004)
- Dr. S.D. Singh (2004)
- S.K. G
- Mrs. Jyotsna Brar ( 2013)
- Mr. Anubhav Saxena Entab Infotech (2018)
