= List of Rimcollians =

The following is a list of some of the prominent alumni of Rashtriya Indian Military College, Dehradun, India. All students who graduate from this school are called Rimcollians.

== Chief of Army Staff ==
| Name | Notability | Ref. |
|---|---|---|
| General K.S. Thimayya | Chief of Army Staff | |
| General G.G. Bewoor | Chief of Army Staff | |
| General Vishwa Nath Sharma | Chief of Army Staff | |
| General Sundararajan Padmanabhan | Chief of Army Staff | |
| General Gul Hasan | Commander-in-Chief, Pakistan Army | |

== Chief of Air Staff ==
| Name | Notability | Ref. |
|---|---|---|
| Air Chief Marshal N.C. Suri | Chief of Air Staff | |
| Air Marshal Asghar Khan | Chief of Air Staff, PAF | |
| Air Marshal Nur Khan | Chief of Air Staff, PAF | |
| Air Chief Marshal Birender Singh Dhanoa | Chief of Air Staff | |

== Vice Chief of Army Staff ==
| Name | Notability | Ref. |
|---|---|---|
| Lt General S. K. Singh | PVSM, UYSM, AVSM, ADC and Administrative Member, Armed Forces Tribunal | |
| Lt General Chandi Prasad Mohanty | PVSM, AVSM, SM, VSM; General Officer in the Indian Army | |

== Vice Chief of Air Staff ==
| Name | Notability | Ref. |
|---|---|---|
| Air Marshal Vinod Patney | SYSM, PVSM, AVSM, VrC, ADC; former Vice Chief of Air Staff and former AOC-in-C Western Air Command | |

== GOC-in-C and GOC ==
| Name | Notability | Ref. |
|---|---|---|
| Lt General Premindra Singh Bhagat | PVSM, VC; GOC-in-C Central Command | |
| Lt General K.P. Candeth | GOC-in-C Western Command; known as the liberator of Goa | |
| Lt General Joginder Singh Dhillon | Padma Bhushan; GOC-in-C Central Command | |
| Lt General Chandi Prasad Mohanty | AVSM, SM, VSM | |
| Lt General Bikram Singh | GOC XV Corps; killed in the 1963 Poonch Indian Air Force helicopter crash | |
| Lt General Khwaja Wasiuddin | HPK, SPK; Commander II Corps, Pakistan Army | |
| Lieutenant General Nav Kumar Khanduri | AVSM, VSM | |

== AOC-in-C and AOC ==
| Name | Notability | Ref. |
|---|---|---|
| Air Marshal Balakrishnan Suresh | PVSM, AVSM, VM, ADC; AOC-in-C Western Air Command and Southern Air Command | |

== Adjutant General ==
| Name | Notability | Ref. |
|---|---|---|
| Major General Hira Lal Atal | Adjutant General | |
| Lt General M.M. Lakhera | PVSM, AVSM, VSM; former Governor of Mizoram, former Lt Governor of Puducherry, and former Lt Governor of Andaman and Nicobar Islands | |
| Major General Karam Singh | PVSM, SM; Deputy Adjutant General | |

== Engineer-in-Chief ==
| Name | Notability | Ref. |
|---|---|---|
| Lt General Sahabzada Yaqub Khan | Engineer-in-Chief, Pakistan Army | |
| Major General Muhammad Anwar Khan | Engineer-in-Chief, Pakistan Army | |

== Commandant, Indian Military Academy ==
| Name | Notability | Ref. |
|---|---|---|
| Lt Gen M.A. Zaki | Commandant, Indian Military Academy | |
| Lt Gen Manvendra Singh | PVSM, AVSM, VSM; former GOC 5 Mountain Division and former GOC Delhi Area | |

== Indian National Army ==
| Name | Notability | Ref. |
|---|---|---|
| Maj General Jaganath Rao Bhonsle | Indian National Army officer | |
| Burhan-ud-Din | Indian National Army officer | |
| Maj General Shah Nawaz Khan | Indian National Army officer | |

== Gallantry awards ==
=== Victoria Cross ===
| Name | Award | Ref. |
|---|---|---|
| Lt Gen Premindra Singh Bhagat | PVSM, VC | |

=== Distinguished Service Order ===
| Name | Award | Ref. |
|---|---|---|
| Gen Kodandera Subayya Thimayya | DSO | |
| Maj Gen Thakur Mahadeo Singh | DSO | |
| Brig Vidya Dhar Jayal | DSO | |

=== Param Vir Chakra ===
| Name | Award | Ref. |
|---|---|---|
| Major Somnath Sharma | Param Vir Chakra | |

=== Vir Chakra ===
| Name | Award | Ref. |
|---|---|---|
| Lt Gen M.A. Zaki | Vir Chakra | |

== Civilian awards ==
=== Padma Vibhushan ===
| Name | Award | Ref. |
|---|---|---|
| General K.S. Thimayya | Padma Vibhushan | |

=== Padma Bhushan ===
| Name | Award | Ref. |
|---|---|---|
| Joginder Singh Dhillon | Padma Bhushan | |
| K.P. Candeth | Padma Bhushan | |
| Gopal Gurunath Bewoor | Padma Bhushan | |

=== Padma Shri ===
| Name | Award | Ref. |
|---|---|---|
| Lt General M.A. Zaki | Padma Shri | |
| Lt General K.P. Candeth | Padma Shri | |

== Sports ==
| Name | Notability | Ref. |
|---|---|---|
| Ritwik Bhattacharya | World top 50 squash player | |

== Ministers ==
| Name | Notability | Ref. |
|---|---|---|
| Maj General Shah Nawaz Khan | Minister of Railways, Central Government | |
| Maj General J.K. Bhonsle | Minister of Rehabilitation, Central Government | |
| Sahabzada Yaqub Khan | Foreign Minister, Pakistan | |
| Naseerullah Babar | Interior Minister, Pakistan | |

== Diplomats and civil servants ==
| Name | Notability | Ref. |
|---|---|---|
| Shaharyar Khan | Foreign Secretary and head of Pakistan's diplomatic corps | |
| Ashwani Kumar | Former Director of CBI and Governor of Nagaland | |
| Rajiv Ratan | IPS officer and Additional Director General of Police, Telangana State | |
| Lt Gen M.M. Lakhera | Lt Governor of Puducherry and Governor of Mizoram; PVSM, AVSM, VSM | |

== Authors and academics ==
| Name | Notability | Ref. |
|---|---|---|
| Maj Gen Ashok Mehta | Author and commentator | |
| Maj Gen Dipankar Banerjee | Author and commentator | |
