= Dipankar Banerjee =

Dipankar Banerjee may refer to:

- Dipankar Banerjee (general), Indian army general
- Dipankar Banerjee (metallurgist) (born 1952), Indian metallurgist
- Dipankar Banerjee (solar physicist), Indian solar physicist

== See also ==
- Dibakar Banerjee, Indian filmmaker
