= Mohammad Akbar Khan (general, born 1895) =

Pakistan's first General (1895-1984)

Mohammad Akbar Khan MBE
- محمد اکبر خان
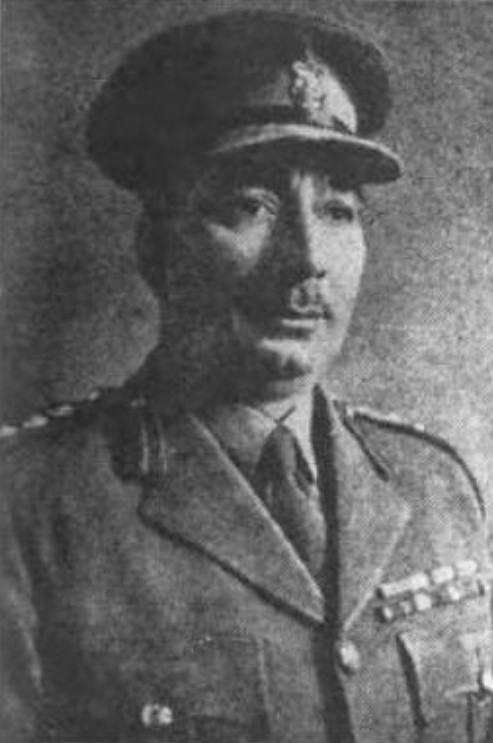
- Portrait as a Colonel, c. 1946

General Officer Commanding 8th Division (Sindh)
- In office 15 August 1947 – 6 December 1950
- Succeeded by: Major General Adam Khan

Personal details
- Born: 19 April 1895 Chakwal, Punjab Province (British India)
- Died: 16 January 1984 (aged 89) Karachi, Pakistan
- Height: 6 ft 2 in (188 cm)
- Spouse: Kudsia (m. 1930)
- Relatives: Iftikhar Khan (brother); Anwar Khan (brother); Zafar Khan (brother); Masud Khan (half-brother); Zulfiqar Ali Khan (cousin)

Military service
- Branch/service: British Indian Army (1914-1947); Pakistan Army (1947-1950)
- Years of service: 1914–1950
- Rank: Major General
- Battles/wars: World War I; Mesopotamian campaign; Siege of Kut; World War II; Battle of Dunkirk; Battle of Imphal; Mohmand campaign of 1935; Waziristan campaign (1936–1939); Indo-Pakistani War of 1947-1948
- Awards: See list
- Service number: 1657 (1914-1918); IA-90 (1918-1947); PA-1 (1950)

Mohammad Akbar Khan (Note: Urdu: محمد اکبر خان; Sometimes spelled as Mohammed Akbar Khan or Muhammad Akbar Khan.) (19 April 1895 — 16 January 1984) was a Pakistani former two-star rank general, also known by his pen name "Rangroot" (Note: (lit. 'recruit')) and the nicknames, "Akbar Khothianwala" (Note: (lit. 'the one with the donkeys')) and "Akbar Khaccharwala," (Note: (lit. 'the one with the mules')) for his role in commanding the Force K6 animal transport company in World War II. He was the first Muslim Brigadier and the highest-ranking Muslim officer in the British Indian Army. In 1947, he became the most senior officer in the Pakistan Army and was its first Major General, earning the distinguished service number, PA-1 in 1950. Additionally, Muhammad Ali Jinnah chose him as his first Honorary aide-de-camp on his personal staff.

Born in Chakwal, Khan joined the British Indian Army as a sowar in 1914. Within a year, he became a Viceroy's Commissioned Officer, which is likely still a record and was the Indian Army Wrestling Champion in 1915. He was also described as a "fine boxer." Between 1915 and 1917, Khan participated in the Siege of Kut and was awarded a King's Commission in 1918 for his valour, the only Indian to receive this honour. He was then sent to a temporary training school for Indian cadets at Daly College.

Throughout his 36-year army career, Khan was an accomplished sportsman. He played polo for his regiment for 15 years, captained the army hockey team that won a championship in 1915, and held All-India records from 1923 to 1926 in discus, javelin, hammer throw, and shot put. In 1925, he secured first place in the 16 lb shot put event with a distance of 36 feet and 1/2 inch at the Punjab Olympic Trials held in Lahore. Khan loved horses and ran a circus in France, the UK, and India, donating the proceeds to charity. He was personally invited by King George VI and Queen Elizabeth The Queen Mother to an Indian lunch near Derby after returning from Dunkirk, having walked nearly 200 miles in 1940.

As the Partition of British India approached in 1947, reports suggested that Brigadier Akbar Khan would be appointed as the Commander-in-Chief of Pakistan's Army. However, Khan denied these reports. After partition, he transferred to the Pakistan Army and became its first native and Muslim General. Shortly before the death of Governor General Muhammad Ali Jinnah, Khan asked him to remove all British officers from the Army and to ban the consumption of alcohol, which Jinnah agreed to. As General Gracey was preparing to retire in 1949, he offered Khan to succeed him as Commander-in-Chief, but Khan declined and said the position was above his competence. Therefore, General Iftikhar Khan, Akbar's younger brother, was chosen as Gracey's successor. However later that year, Iftikhar died in an airplane crash and General Gracey's service was extended. Two years later, General Ayub Khan was appointed as his successor.

Akbar Khan retired in 1950. He filed nomination papers in order to be elected to the Constituent Assembly of Pakistan in 1951, which was established to draft the 1956 Constitution of Pakistan. He later turned to writing on Islamic literature and military history, publishing his first book in 1954 under his name and then many others under the alias "Rangroot".

In 2024, the story of his military career was featured in the docuseries Erased: WW2's Heroes of Color, which aired on National Geographic, Disney+, and Hulu. He was portrayed by Jack Gill.

== Early life (1895-1913) ==
Mohammad Akbar Khan was born on 19 April 1895, although army records list his birth year as 1897, into a Shia Muslim family which belonged to the Punjabi Minhas Rajput clan of Chakwal. His father, Raja Fazal Dad Khan OBE (1847-1943), was a Zamindar who had served as a Viceroy's Commissioned Officer with the 12th Cavalry Unit of the British Indian Army and in various roles for 43 1/2 years. Akbar Khan's mother, Badsha (died 1955), was a Pathan woman and the second wife of Fazaldad Khan.

In his teenage years, Akbar Khan was described as a good sportsman, standing six foot two inches tall, and "phenomenally muscular" but decent in his studies. His father wanted him to be a farmer but he was adamant about joining the army. According to Syed Hashmi, one of Akbar's grandsons, Akbar Khan "barely had a 10th-grade education."

=== Ancestry ===
Mohammad Akbar Khan's paternal grandfather was a general in the Sikh Khalsa Army in 1839, while his maternal grandfather was the aide-de-camp to Thomas Harte Franks during the Second Anglo-Sikh war and Indian Rebellion of 1857. He later raised a Muslim squadron in the 11th King Edward's Own Lancers (Probyn's Horse), which he commanded.

== Personal life ==
Mohammad Akbar Khan had 13 siblings, nine brothers and four sisters. Six brothers including him were in the army, namely Major Generals Iftikhar Khan and Muhammad Anwar Khan, Brigadiers Muhammad Afzal, Mohammad Zafar Khan, and Muhammad Yusuf Khan. His brothers Tahir Khan and Masud Khan chose civilian careers. Another brother, Baqir Khan, was killed in a motorcycle accident in 1923 while attending St Catharine's College, Cambridge.

Akbar Khan married Kudsia in 1930 and they had a son and three daughters, Razia, Amna, and Hamida. As of 2023, his great-grandson, Justice Jawad Akbar Sarwana, serves on the High Court of Sindh and is set to retire in 2034.

As a captain, Khan donated a set of fine old Jezails to the Indian Military Academy on its establishment.

== Military career ==
=== British Indian Army (1914-1947) ===
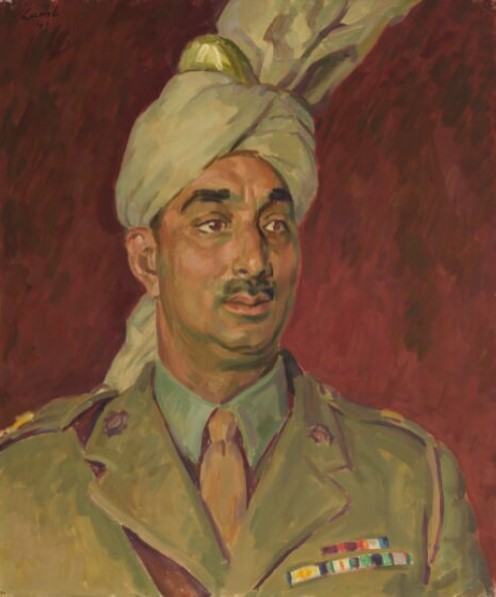
Major Mohd. Akbar Khan, Commanding Officer of the 29 Mule Company; painted by Henry Lamb c. 1941, exhibited at the Imperial War Museum

Akbar Khan left his home to join the 12th Cavalry on 1 May 1914 at the age of 16. He returned all his property, including land, to his father and he lived on his army salary of Rs. 12 per month. (Note: 15 rupees equaled £1 in 1913, equivalent to £97.51 in June 2024.) Within a year, Sowar Akbar Khan became a Viceroy's Commissioned Officer, which is likely a record in the British Indian Army to date. He was the Indian Army Wrestling Champion in 1915 and was also described as a "fine boxer." On 1 July 1915, Khan was promoted to Jemadar.

Between 28 November 1915 and 13 September 1918, Khan participated in World War I, most notably in the Siege of Kut. For his valour, he was awarded a King's Commission in 1918, the only Indian to receive this honour. He was then sent to a temporary training school for Indian cadets at Daly College Indore. Despite many challenges, including his initial lack of proficiency in the English language, he learned to speak and write English fluently in one year. He excelled in his training and "had made such progress that he was sent, at the special request of his brother officers," to his old regiment, where he served as adjutant, quartermaster, and squadron commander.

He joined the Probyn's Horse regiment on 6 January 1921; 1st battalion of the 14th Punjab Regiment on 11 May 1934; and the Royal Indian Army Service Corps on 16 September 1935 or 5 February 1936. He served as the assistant recruiting officer in Lahore from 1 May 1933 to 30 April 1934. He served in the Mohmand Campaigns on the North-West Frontier of India in 1935 and again served in the region in 1936-37. For his service, he was mentioned in despatches on 18 February 1938.

In the Punjab Olympic Trials held in Lahore on 7 February 1925, the results for the 16 lb shot put event: Lieutenant Akbar Khan from the 5th Probyn's Horse, Ambala, secured first place with a distance of 36 feet and 1/2 inch; Dav Raj from Medical College Lahore came in second. Fond of horses, he ran a circus in France, the United Kingdom, and British India, donating the proceeds to charity. One of his fondest memories was being personally invited by King George VI and Queen Elizabeth The Queen Mother to an Indian lunch near Derby after returning from Dunkirk, having walked nearly 200 miles in 1940.

In 1933, he was transferred to the 1st Battalion of the 14th Punjab Regiment and commanded the regiment in the Mohmand campaign of 1935. He then joined the Royal Indian Army Service Corps and saw action in Waziristan with No. 3 Animal Transport Company. At the outbreak of World War II, he served in France with the British Expeditionary Force (BEF), commanding an animal transport company. On 28 May 1940, Major Akbar Khan led 299 soldiers along a beach in northern France, the only Indian unit in the BEF at Dunkik. Amidst the wail of Stuka sirens, shells landing in the sea, and British troops preparing for evacuation, these soldiers of the British Indian Army, carrying their injured imam (Akbar), made their way to the East Mole and boarded a ship to England under the cover of night. Upon arriving in Dover, they borrowed brass trays and played Punjabi folk music, with even several British onlookers joining in the dance.

Thereafter, throughout the Battle of Britain he regularly broadcast for BBC Radio to India, America, Australia, and New Zealand about the Indian Army’s history and traditions. He returned to British India in 1941 and, when Japan entered the war, he was stationed in Dimapur, managing over 3,000 motor vehicles transporting troops and supplies to Tamu and Tedim. He served in the Arakan in 1944 and commanded the 9 M.T. Training Centre at Meerut in 1945. He was promoted to Colonel in July 1945 and appointed Vice-President of the Briggs Committee. In February of the same year, he became Deputy Director of Resettlement.

In 1940, Akbar Khan witnessed the dire situation of war refugees in Flanders and shared his harrowing experience: "It is extremely hard to describe the way they (the Germans) treated the unarmed refugees." He further said: "They bombed and machine-gunned them. I saw it with my own eyes, at least twice. It was most tragic to see old men and women and children in a state of starvation, out in the open in rain and mud—not knowing where to go to—and then being shot and fired at."

In 1946, Brigadier Akbar Khan was appointed Commander of Headquarters Meerut Sub-Area, and stayed in this role until the Partition of British India in August 1947.

=== Pakistan Army (1947-1950) ===
Brigadier Akbar Khan transferred to the Pakistan Army on 14 August 1947. He was promoted to Major General the next day and was appointed General Officer Commanding of the 8th Division in Sindh.

General Mohammad Akbar Khan was known for being the only favourite general of the founder and Governor General of Pakistan, Muhammad Ali Jinnah. On 25 June 1948, Khan met with Jinnah and repeatedly stressed the importance of kicking out British officers from the Pakistan Army and urged Jinnah to issue a ban on alcohol, saying: "Our officers drink alcohol during banquets in schools as it is an ancient tradition of the armed forces." Jinnah signaled him to be quiet and called his aide-de-camp and instructed, "Bring my Confederation Box." He opened it and said, "General, this is the Holy Qur'an. It says, Alcohol and drugs are forbidden." Khan then said, "This is why I am asking you to issue an order announcing to the public and the army that alcohol is forbidden." Jinnah smiled and responded, "Do you think my order will be more effective than the orders of the Holy Quran? Not at all! If they do not follow the Quran, why would they follow the Quaid?" Akbar Khan replied, "I seek refuge with Allah, my intention was not to suggest that your command is superior to the Quranic verses, but rather to draw the public's attention to them." Jinnah agreed and issued a draft announcing the ban, citing the verses of the Quran. Akbar Khan copied the draft and issued an order to stop drinking in all units under his command, which remained effective until his retirement. General Akbar also told Jinnah, "We are basically guided by your speeches. You said: We Muslims should be guided by the Qur'an in all walks of life."

As the tenure of Commander-in-Chief General Gracey was nearing its end at the close of 1949, he approached Akbar Khan to succeed him. However, Akbar declined, citing that the position was beyond his competence. The next candidate in line was Akbar's younger brother, General Iftikhar Khan. However, Iftikhar died in an air crash before he could take office, resulting in Gracey's extension and General Ayub Khan succeeding him following his retirement.

== Later life ==
In September 1951, Akbar Khan filed his nomination papers for election to the Constituent Assembly from Punjab in the quota of six seats to be filled by the Punjab Assembly. The Constituent Assembly was established to draft the 1956 Constitution of Pakistan.

In June 1952, Khan was appointed as the first Colonel Commandant of the Pakistan Army Service Corps. He was in the role until June 1958.

== Illness and death ==
Towards the end of his life, he suffered from dementia. Akbar Khan died on 16 January 1984 in Karachi, at the age of 87 or 89, and was survived by three of his children and 25 great-grandchildren.

== Published works ==
He wrote over 40 books under his name and the alias 'Rangroot', which means private soldier or enlisted man, to denote his rise from a modest background to the rank of Major General, on subjects related to Islam and military strategy.

- Mohammad Akbar Khan (1954). Aslah-E-Jang. Matba Firoz & sons, Karachi.
- Islami Tareeq-e-Jung. Firoz Sons Limited, Lahore. 1959.
- خالد بن ولىد، سىف‌الله (Khalid bin Walid, Sword of Allah). Fīrūz Sons. 1965.
- Mohammad Bin Qasim. Firoz Sons Limited, Lahore.
- The Choice of the Arabs Versus Zionists Cult. Islamic Science Association. 1967.
- Guerrilla Warfare, Its Past, Present and Future: And, Counter Guerrilla Warfare. Rangrut. 1967.
- The Ideologies in Conflict. Islamic Military Science Association. 1967.
- Maḥsar-i Falast̤īn. 1968.
- Sultan Salahuddin Yousaf Ayubi Versus the Crusaders. Islamic Military Science Association. 1968.
- The Islamic Pattern-of-war: Planning & Training: Theory. Islamic Military Science Association. 1968.
- The Mystery of Debacle of Pakistan, 1971, and Myth of Exploitation Since 1947, and Secret of the Covert War-unmasked. Islamic Military Science Association. 1972.
- Ḥadīs-i difāʻ Nabī-ĕ-Akram-ke usva-ĕ-ḥasana-kī rawshanī-me. 1973.
- Ghazwat-e-Nabi (Battles fought by Prophet Muhammad). August 2019.
- Māz̤ī, ḥāl aur mustaqbal kā aṣlaḥ jang, 1954
- Krūsaid aur jihād. 1961.
- Hazrat Ali as an Amir, 1966
- Muhammad Mustafā Kamāl Pasha, 1966
- Turkon ki jidd o jahd-i āzādi (Turks' Struggles for Freedom), 1966
- K̲h̲avātīn-i Islām aur hadīs, 1966, 160 p.
- On war; the Islamic policy: grand strategy & diplomacy, 1967
- K̲h̲avātīn-i Islām kelie mashʻal-i rāh, 1967
- Timur (Tamarlane) as an Amir, 1969
- Meri Akhri Manzil (My Final Destination). Al-Faisal Nashran. 2006.

== Dates of rank ==
| Insignia | Rank | Component | Date of promotion |
|---|---|---|---|
| | Second Lieutenant | British Indian Army | 1 December 1919 |
| | Lieutenant | British Indian Army | 17 July 1920; 1 December 1920 |
| | Captain | British Indian Army | 17 July 1927 |
| | Major | British Indian Army | 17 July 1938 |
| | Lieutenant Colonel | British Indian Army | 31 October 1942 (temporary); 17 July 1946 |
| | Colonel | British Indian Army | 26 January 1946 |
| | Brigadier | British Indian Army | 14 December 1946; 21 December 1946 (acting) |
| | Major General | Pakistan Army | 15 August 1947 |

== Awards and decorations ==
- 1914–15 Star
- General Service Medal (1918)
- Allied Victory Medal 1914-1918
- Indian Distinguished Service Medal, 1918
- Member of the Order of the British Empire, 1930
- India General Service Medal, (Mohmand Clasp 1935)
- Mentioned in despatches, 1938
- 1939–1945 Star

Member of the Most Excellent Order of the British Empire (MBE); 1930
| 1914–15 Star | General Service Medal (1918) | Allied Victory Medal 1914-1918 |
| India General Service Medal Mohmand campaign of 1935 | 1939–1945 Star | Pakistan Medal (Pakistan Tamgha); 1947 |
