= Iftikhar Khan =

Pakistani general, C-in-C designate (1909–1949)

- افتخار خان
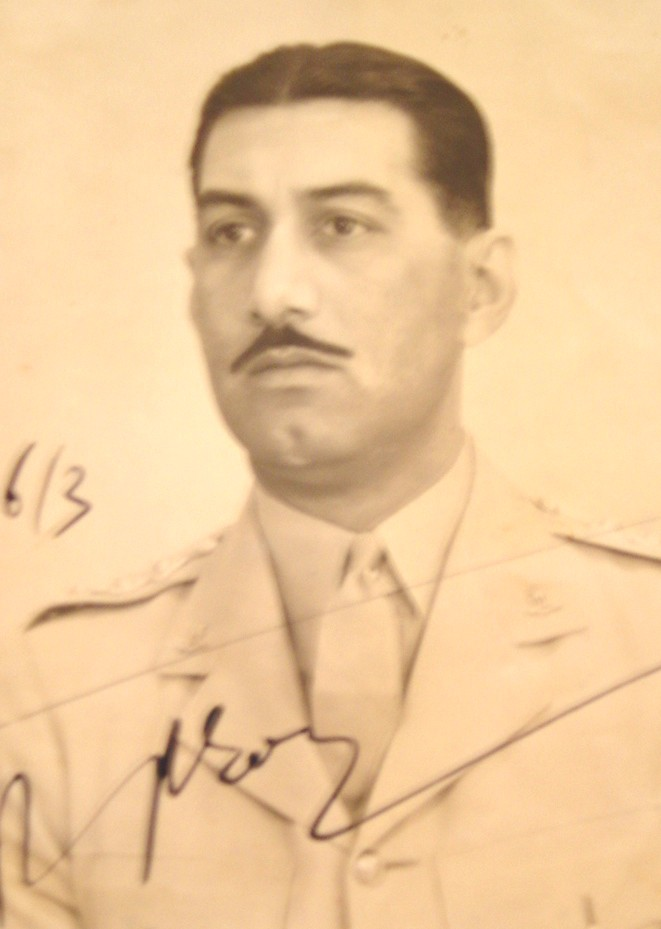
- Capt Iftikhar Khan as Adjutant, 3rd Cavalry, c. 1938-1940

General Officer Commanding 10th Infantry Division (Lahore)
- In office 2 January 1948 – 5 December 1949
- Preceded by: Major General R. W. Key
- Succeeded by: Brigadier Cuthbert Rodham

Commanding officer 7th Light Cavalry
- In office 12 September 1946 – 1 December 1946

Personal details
- Born: Mohammad Iftikhar Khan; 10 January 1909 Chakwal, Punjab Province (British India)
- Died: 13 December 1949 (aged 40) Sindh, Dominion of Pakistan
- Cause of death: Pakair C-53 crash
- Children: 1
- Relatives: Khudadad Khan (uncle); Mohammad Akbar Khan (brother); Muhammad Anwar Khan (brother); Mohammad Zafar Khan (brother); Masud Khan (brother)
- Education: Royal Military College, Sandhurst; Joint Services Staff College (UK); Staff College, Quetta
- Awards: See list

Military service
- Branch/service: British Indian Army (1929-1947); Pakistan Army (1947-1949)
- Years of service: 1929–1949
- Rank: Major General
- Unit: Manchester Regiment (1929-1930); 7th Light Cavalry; 3rd Cavalry
- Commands: 7th Light Cavalry; 10th Infantry Division
- Battles/wars: World War II; Indo-Pakistani War of 1947

Major General Mohammad Iftikhar Khan (Note: Urdu: محمد افتخار خان) (10 January 1909 — 13 December 1949) known as Iftikhar Khan and Ifti among his colleagues, was a Pakistani two-star rank general, who last served as the general officer commanding 10th Division in Lahore from 1948 to 1949, before proceeding to attend a course at the Imperial Defence College. He was the most senior officer in line to succeed General Gracey as the commander-in-chief, but was killed in a Dakota C-53 crash with 22 others, including his wife and infant daughter, leading to General Ayub Khan being appointed instead.

Born in Chakwal, Khan was awarded a scholarship to the Royal Military College, Sandhurst in 1927. He was commissioned into the British Indian Army in 1929.

== Early life ==
Mohammad Iftikhar Khan was born on 10 January 1909 into a Muslim family which belonged to the Punjabi Minhas Rajput clan of Chakwal. His father, Sardar Bahadur Ressaidar Raja Fazal Dad Khan, was a Zamindar and had served as a Viceroy's Commissioned Officer with the 12th Cavalry (Frontier Force).

On 12 November 1927, Iftikhar and Azam Khan were the two Muslim cadets selected to attend the Royal Military College, Sandhurst which began on 2 February 1928. Days later on 17 November, both were awarded the Pratap Singh Memorial Scholarship, worth £100 (equivalent to £5,432 in 2025) each.

== Personal life ==
Iftikhar Khan was married to Begum Meher Iftikhar, a Parsi woman who was the number one woman rider in India. According to Express News, she converted to Islam.

Iftikhar had 13 siblings, nine brothers and four sisters. Six brothers including him were in the army, namely Major Generals Mohammad Akbar Khan and Muhammad Anwar Khan, Brigadiers Muhammad Afzal, Mohammad Zafar Khan, and Muhammad Yusuf Khan. The three other brothers Baqir Khan, Tahir Khan, and Masud Khan chose civilian careers.

== Military career ==
=== British Indian Army and World War II ===
After graduating from the Royal Military College, Sandhurst, Khan was commissioned as a Second Lieutenant into the British Indian Army on 29 August 1929. He then spent a year on attachment to the 2nd Battalion of the Manchester Regiment. He was posted to the 7th Light Cavalry on 16 October 1930 and was promoted to lieutenant on 29 November 1931. While with the 3rd Cavalry Regiment, Khan also played Polo. In April 1934, he came in 1st and won The Netheravon Cup.

He served as Regimental Quartermaster from 1 August 1937 to 18 April 1938, after which he became Regimental Adjutant of the 3rd Cavalry Regiment, holding that position from 19 April 1938 to 5 August 1940. He attended the Staff College, Quetta in 1941 and later became the first Muslim to be the directing staff.

He served at No. 2 Indian Army Armoured Corps Training Center from 17 December 1941 to January 1943, before taking on the role of General Staff Officer Grade II at Ceylon Army Command Headquarters until July 1943. He then served as General Staff Officer Grade II at the Staff College, Quetta until April 1944. He subsequently served as Second-in-command of the 45th Cavalry from 1945 until 31 August 1946.

On 1 September 1946, Khan became the first Indian commandant of the 7th Light Cavalry. In December 1946, Lieutenant Colonel Iftikhar Khan, Haji Iftikhar Ahmad, and Colonel Mian Hayaud Din were among several officers selected to attend the first course at the Joint Services Staff College (UK) which commenced in January 1947. The course ended on 19 July 1947.

=== Pakistan Army ===
After the Partition of British India on 14 August 1947, Khan opted to join the newly formed Pakistan Army. He was commander of the 103 Infantry Brigade. His promotion to Major General was announced on 31 December 1947 and he subsequently assumed the command of the 10th Division in Lahore.

According to (retd) Major General Shaukat Riza, Iftikhar Khan had been nominated by Prime Minister Liaquat Ali Khan to become the first native Commander-in-Chief on the retirement of General Gracey.

==== Death ====
The Ministry of Defence announced that a Pak-Air Dakota, flying between Lahore and Karachi, had crashed against a hill forty-five miles north-east of Karachi. Rescue parties who made their way to the scene among hills on difficult terrain found the aircraft totally wrecked and no survivors. The aircraft carried 22 passengers and four crew members. The ministry said a court of inquiry is investigating the accident. They added that "the deaths of Major-General Iftikhar Khan and Brigadier Sher Khan constitute a most regrettable loss to the Pakistan Army and to the country. Both of these officers were soldiers of wide experience and proven ability."

The funeral procession began on 15 December 1949 at the Frere Hall in Karachi, making its way one and a half miles through Saddar Bazaar with thousands of people witnessing the procession before it reached its final destination at the Armed Forces Cemetery (Fauji Qabristan). The remains of Generals Iftikhar and Sher Khan were transported onto Gun carriages by military personnel, namely Commodore Choudri, Brigadier Rodham, Brigadier Sher Ali Khan Pataudi, and Group Captain Bapu Murad.

Among the mourners was Iftikhar's brother, Major General Muhammed Akbar Khan and Lieutenant Colonel Yusuf Khan, the brother of Sher Khan. Following them were Admiral Jefford, Major General Agha Mohammad Raza, and Malik Ghulam Muhammad, who represented Prime Minister Liaquat Ali Khan. Others in attendance were diplomats, government officials, military personnel, and prominent individuals from Karachi. Over 30,000 people attended the Islamic funeral at the Fauji Qabristan.

On 16 December 1949, Prime Minister Liaquat Ali Khan addressed military officers at Peshawar. He also said: "Pakistan has lost two of its most distinguished officers, Major-General Iftikhar Khan and Brigadier Sher Khan, Pakistan Army can ill-afford the loss of these officers".

== Legacy and commemorations ==
(Retd) Major General Sher Ali Khan Pataudi, who referred to Iftikhar Khan as his best friend and said he had known him since they met at the Royal Indian Military College in 1925, recalled that he was professionally sound, well read and highly intelligent. He added that Iftikhar was a shy person and people wrongfully assumed he was conceited. He also said that Iftikhar was concerned about the politicisation of officers and distrusted politicians.

According to him, Iftikhar once said: "it would be better for both of us if we both got out [of the army] before our hands were stained and garments polluted." Pataudi also believed that if Iftikhar had lived to assume the role of Commander-in-Chief instead of General Ayub Khan, "he would not have allowed the Army to be used for political purposes" and "would have never used his position as C-in-C, to come into power through the Army-he disliked being actively involved with politics or with the politician in any form."

(Retd) Major General A.O. Mitha, in his memoirs, "Unlikely Beginnings: a Soldier’s Life", wrote: "Iftikhar was a tough commander and had the reputation of eating a brigadier or a colonel for breakfast every day. However, he was big enough to tolerate outspoken, forceful subordinates.".

In his memoir "Unusual Undertakings: Military Memoirs", (Retd) Lieutenant General James Wilson wrote:

"The defence of Lahore fell to 10th Division, commanded by the outstanding Pakistani general of his generation, Iftikhar Khan. 'Ifty' was an excellent commander, with a personality matching his military attainments. Tough, sensible and versed in regimental soldiering, he quickly built up morale in his formation; he also understood the need for the army to keep out of politics. It was a disaster for Pakistan when 'Ifty', shortly after he had been selected in 1950 as the first Pakistani C in C, was killed in an air crash together with Sher Khan, by then promoted Major General. The loss of these two brilliant officers affected the whole course of Pakistan' history. I doubt if Iftikhar would ever have entertained the possibility of a military takeover. He was a big enough man to have imposed such a philosophy on the Army and it is Pakistan's misfortune that he was denied the opportunity.

(Retd) Lieutenant General Mohammad Yusuf, who was concurrently adjutant of 7th Light Cavalry remembered Iftikhar, as "a fine horseman and a strict adjutant."

(Retd) Major General Shaukat Riza described Iftikhar in his book, The Pakistan Army 1947-49, as: "a handsome and forceful character who was never slowed by obstacles."

According to (retd) Major Shaukat Hayat Khan:

General Ayub Khan had started dabbling in politics since the time he was posted to command troops in East Pakistan. There he saw the ICS Civil servants ruling the roost and making use of the divide and rule, methods of the colonial era between various political factions. Later, after the unfortunate death of C-in-C elect General Iftikhar, in an air crash he was selected C-in-C mainly because of his connections with Sardar Bahadar Khan a Deputy Minister from North West Frontier Province. General Ayub started dreaming about taking over the control of the Government of Pakistan very early on and made notes on it at Claridges Hotel in London when he was there on his way to USA. As a first step towards his ambitions he accepted becoming a Minister in the Bogra Cabinet, in 1954.

== Dates of rank ==
Insignia	Rank	Branch	Date of rank
	Second Lieutenant	British Indian Army	29 August 1929 (unattached); 16 October 1930
	Lieutenant	British Indian Army	29 November 1931
	Captain	British Indian Army	1 August 1938; 7 August 1940 (Staff Captain)
	Major	British Indian Army	20 January to 19 April 1943 (acting); 20 April 1943 (temporary)
	Lieutenant Colonel	British Indian Army	July 1943
	Major General	Pakistan Army	31 December 1947
