= Hira Lal Atal =

Indian Army officer (1905-1985)

- Born: 26 January 1905
- Died: 23 January 1985 (aged 79)
- Occupations: Soldier, writer

Major General Hira Lal Atal (26 January 1905 – 23 January 1985) was an Indian Army officer in the British Indian Army from 1925 until 1947 and the Indian Army from 1947. He became the first indigenous Adjutant General of independent India. He was instrumental in designing the Indian Armed Forces' highest award for bravery, the Param Vir Chakra. Later, he became Chief Commissioner of Tripura.

== Career ==
=== Early years ===
Hira Lal Atal attended the Rawlinson Section (renamed the Pratap Section in 1947) of the Rashtriya Indian Military College RIMC in Dehradun, India. RIMC was intended to prepare native Indians to take command of the British Indian Army and was earlier known as the Prince of Wales Royal Indian Military College, which was established in 1921. Hira was the first cadet captain, or head boy.

Atal attended Sandhurst and was commissioned a second lieutenant into the Unattached List, Indian Army on 29 January 1925. He was attached to the 1st battalion Gordon Highlanders from 20 March 1925, and appointed to the Indian Army on 31 March 1926, and the 16th Light Cavalry.

Atal became a lieutenant on 29 April 1927 and a quarter-master, serving in that post from 3 January 1928 until 1 October 1930. He attended an eight-month course at the Equestrian School, Saugor during 1929 and 1930. He was appointed adjutant on 1 October 1930 until being attached to the Rewa State Forces. He was promoted to captain on 29 January 1934. He was appointed chief of staff 16 February 1935, an appointment he relinquished in 1936. He was attached to the 15th Lancers, a training regiment, on 7 September 1937 until being appointed adjutant and quarter-master of the Equestrian School, Saugor on 4 December 1938 until the establishment was closed in September 1939.

=== War years ===
Atal attended the Command and Staff College in Quetta from 1940 to 1941 and joined the staff from 1941 to 1942. He became a major on 29 January 1942 and by 1943 was serving with the 47th Cavalry, a unit raised in April 1941 and later sent to Kohat as a frontier defense armored-car regiment. It was disbanded in August 1943 and he was sent back to the 16th Light Cavalry. He became an acting lieutenant colonel on 31 July 1944 and the commanding officer of the 18th King Edward's Own Cavalry until 13 February 1946. He commanded the 2nd Independent Armored Brigade from December 1947 until February 1948. He became a major general and commander of the 1st Armored Division from February 1948 until May 1948.

=== Adjutant General ===
Atal was the first indigenous Adjutant General of independent India, entrusted by Jawaharlal Nehru with the responsibility of designing (with Savitri Khanolkar) the Param Vir Chakra, the Indian equivalent of the Victoria Cross.

His brother, K.L. Atal, who went on to win the Maha Vir Chakra, was also a Rimcollian.

== Post-retirement ==
Atal was the Chief Commissioner of Tripura between 15 February 1955 and 8 November 1956.

== Notes ==
- London Gazette (various dates)
- Indian Army List (various dates)
