= Svetlana Beriosova =

Lithuanian-British ballerina

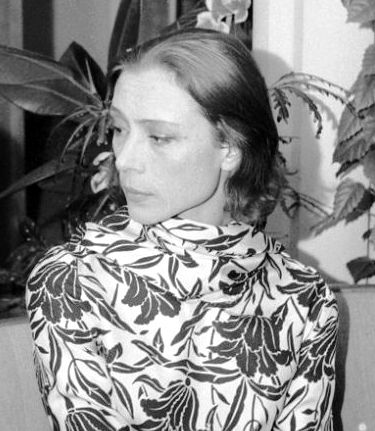
Svetlana Beriosova at the press conference at Hilton Amsterdam in June 1964

Svetlana Nikolayevna Beriosova (Russian: Светла́на Никола́евна Берёзова; 24 September 1932 – 10 November 1998), also spelled Beriozova or Beryozova, was a Lithuanian-British prima ballerina who danced with The Royal Ballet for more than 20 years.

== Early life ==
Beriosova was born in Kaunas, Lithuania, the daughter of Nicolas Beriosoff (or Nicolas Beriozoff; 1906–1996), a Lithuanian ballet master. His pupils included Rudolf Nureyev, Mikhail Baryshnikov, and Alicia Markova; he founded the Zurich Opera Ballet School. Beriosoff was of ethnic Russian descent and emigrated to England. Beriosova came to the United States in 1940, where she studied ballet. Her mother died in New York when she was 10 years old. Nicolas Beriosoff—called "Poppa"—then married a wardrobe mistress from his dance company; after their divorce, he married an Italian surgeon, and after another divorce married half-German Doris Catana, the same age as his daughter, who ran a ballet school in Zurich.

== Career ==
Beriosova made her professional debut in 1947 with Nesta Toumine's Ottawa Ballet. In 1952, after appearing with several major companies, including the Grand Ballet de Monte Carlo and the Metropolitan Ballet, she joined the Sadler's Wells Ballet, where she became prima ballerina in 1955.

Notable among her leading roles there was Swanilda in Coppélia, which allowed her to showcase her rarely used comic talent. She was better known for her eloquent and elegant classical style, which was highlighted in the many leading roles she created, such as Princess Belle Rose in John Cranko's The Prince of the Pagodas (1957), the Fairy in Kenneth MacMillan's Le Baiser de la fée (The Fairy's Kiss, 1960), and Lady Elgar in Frederick Ashton's Enigma Variations (1968). She also danced such traditional classical roles as Odette/Odile in Swan Lake, Aurora in The Sleeping Beauty, and the title role in Giselle.

As well as dancing the entire classical repertoire, Beriosova created the leading part in several modern ballets, notably the title role in Cranko's Antigone (1959). In one of her more unusual modern parts, the title role of Ashton's Persephone (1961), she recited André Gide's poetry in French in addition to dancing to the music of Igor Stravinsky.

Although it was not immediately apparent, Beriosova's career began its downturn in 1962, when Rudolf Nureyev came to England and it was widely understood that the dancer chosen to become his partner would "achieve worldwide fame overnight". Beriosova, at 5'8", was the same height as Nureyev, and would have been far taller en pointe, so Margot Fonteyn, who had left the stage, returned to be his partner. The performances were received rapturously and earned glowing reviews, but it was expected that Fonteyn would only dance for a year or two, and Beriosova retained international popularity and a "huge following of fans". However, in the years that followed, it became clear that Beriosova would not achieve the premier status widely considered to have been her destiny; by 1966, Fonteyn's firmly-established dominance and the lack of opportunity this afforded Beriosova coupled with the disintegration of her marriage led to the beginning of Beriosova's "precipitous" "downward spiral", although she continued to dance in major productions for some time. Plagued by illness, injuries, and worsening alcoholism, Beriosova performed very little in the 1970s. In the spring of 1971, a disastrous performance in the role of the tsarina in Anastasia at Covent Garden ended in Beriosova's drunken collapse whilst en pointe on stage, and she was carried off; her contract was terminated and her career with the Royal Ballet was over. She retired in 1975 but continued to coach young dancers. On her retirement from dancing, she became a popular teacher and dancers' coach, working in public onstage in Maina Gielgud's Steps, Notes and Squeaks in 1978 and 1980.

== Personal life ==
Beriosova married the psychoanalyst Masud Khan on January 23, 1959, and they divorced in 1974 after 15 years; with the downturn of her career, Khan, who "valued people most when they were shining", felt that she was no longer his equal in prominence, and "stopped adoring" Beriosova. Khan later wrote that, with his admiration and love for her art shaken, he failed to support her, and "collapsed and let her down abominably". The loss of "her major stabilizing force" set in motion Beriosova's deterioration in professional and private life. She and her husband both had severe problems with alcoholism, which in her case intensified once she retired.

She was a close friend of actress/singer Julie Andrews, and was the godmother to scenic designer/theatre director Tony Walton's daughter, Emma Walton Hamilton.

Beriosova died from cancer, aged 66, in Kensington, London in 1998. She was survived by her stepmother, Doris Beriozoff. In the Financial Times, the eminent ballet critic Clement Crisp wrote that Beriosova was "a ballerina of serene physical beauty and of no less lovely temperament", with "pearl-like radiance", and that to all of her performances she "brought a generous and illuminating sensibility" and was "in everything a ballerina whose understanding of her art and command of its nuances went to the very core of any role she assumed", concluding her to have been "blessed with an extraordinary ability to tell the great truths about theatrical dancing with a heart-stopping sensitivity and dignity".
