= Muhammad Anwar Khan =

Pakistani general (1915–2005)

Major General Muhammad Anwar Khan HJ
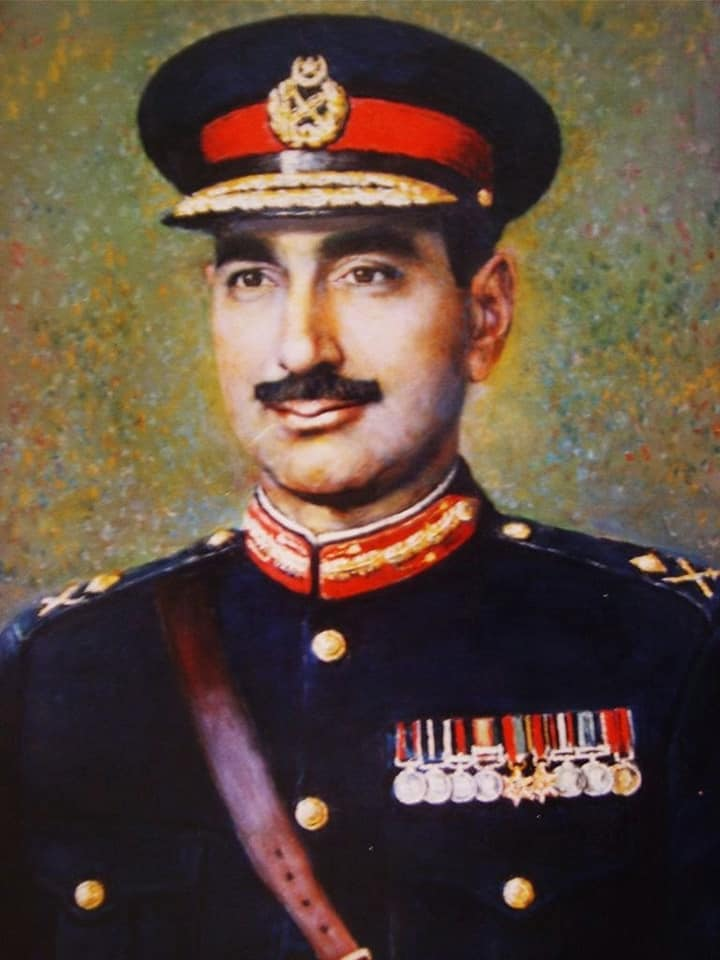
- Born: 23 February 1915; Chakwal, Punjab, British Raj
- Died: 5 February 2005; Rawalpindi, Pakistan
- Military career
- Allegiance: British Raj; Pakistan
- Branch: British Indian Army (1936-1947); Pakistan Army (1947-1965)
- Service years: 1936–1965
- Rank: Major General
- Service number: PA–48
- Unit: Pakistan Army Corps of Engineers
- Conflicts: Third Waziristan Campaign; World War II; Burma campaign
- Awards: Hilal-e-Jurat

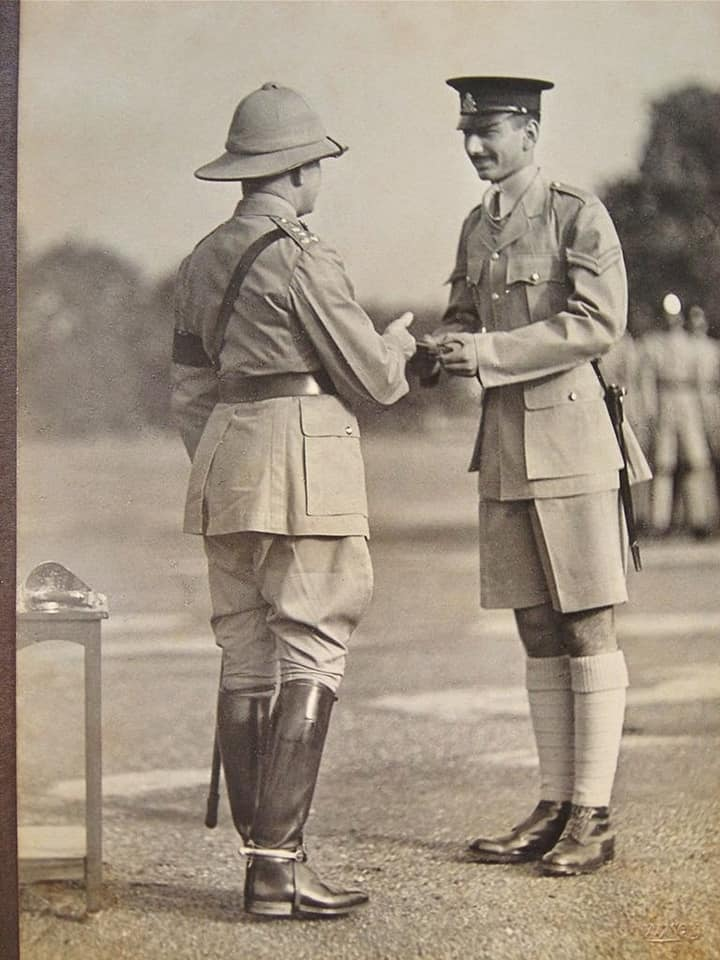
Courtesy Maj. Gen Anwar Khan

Raja Muhammad Anwar Khan HJ (23 February 1915 – 5 February 2005) was the first Pakistan Army Engineer Officer and the first Muslim Engineer In Chief of the Pakistan Army. He was the first Muslim to be a Sapper officer in the British Indian Army and its pre-partition Indian Corps of Engineers. His Pakistan Army number was 48 (PA-48).

== Ethnicity ==
Khan belonged to a Punjabi Minhas Rajput family from Chakwal. The Mair Minhas tribe has a long martial tradition of serving in the British Indian and Pakistan Army.

== Military background ==
Khan belonged to a family of 9 brothers and 4 sisters, of which 6 brothers were selected as officers in the British Army (Akbar, Iftikhar, Zafar, Yousaf, Afzal and Anwar). Three brothers rose to the rank of Major General and the other three to the rank of Brigadier. Three brothers chose civilian careers (Bakir, Tahir and Masud).

Anwar Khan was selected for the 4th batch at Indian Military Academy (IMA) Dehra Dun in February 1934, and passed out on 3 June 1936. However, his seniority in the army was considered from 1 November 1935. In 1957, he was promoted to Maj Gen as Engineer-in-Chief which he served as for eight years. Upon retirement from the Army on 1 May 1965, he served as Chairman OGDC till 1969. Maj Gen Anwar Khan spent the remainder of his retirement years in Rawalpindi, where he died on 5 February 2005.

His eldest brother, Major General Muhammed Akbar Khan (PA-1) held the honor of being the first Muslim to become a Major General in the British Indian Army. Akbar Khan enlisted in the army in May 1914 and served with his father's regiment 12th Cavalry. He was a veteran of both World Wars I and II and the first Muslim officer to join the British Indian Cavalry and served in the 5th King Edward's Own (KEO) Probyn's Horse. He was the senior most officer of the Pakistan Army and retired honorably in 1949. Major General Muhammad Iftikhar Khan, who was educated at RIMC and Sandhurst, was commissioned in August 1929 and joined 7th Light Cavalry. He was transferred to 3rd Cavalry when it was Indianized. During Second World War, he served with the newly raised 45th Cavalry. He was the first British Indian officer to be appointed Instructor at the Command and Staff College Quetta, and was tipped as the first Pakistani Commander-in-Chief after General Douglas David Gracey's retirement, but died in an air crash with his wife, son and some other senior officers in 1949 at Jang Shahi. Iftikhar was a multi-handicap polo player also. Brigadier Muhammed Zafar Khan was commissioned in 1934 and was the first non-British Indian Commander of British Indian Cavalry. He retired as Director Remount, Veterinary & Farm Corps (RV&FC). Brigadier Muhammad Yousef Khan was commissioned in 1935 and retired as Director RV&FC. Brigadier Muhammad Afzal Khan was commissioned in 1935 and joined 16th Light Cavalry. He later transferred to Royal Indian Army Service Corps (RIASC).

General Anwar's father Khan Bahadur Raja Fazal Dad Khan was a Zamindar (landowner) and served as a Viceroy's Commissioned Officer with the 12th Cavalry unit of the British Indian Army. He was also granted the title of Khan Bahadur.

== Family background ==
Major General Muhammad. Anwar Khan (PA-48) belonged to the martial family of Maayr-Minhas Rajputs from Chakwal – the town that was not only founded many centuries ago by his ancestors, but which also bears the name of his forefather. Around 1860 the family's lands and properties in the Chakwal area were confiscated by the British, under the orders of Brigadier General John Nicholson, for rising against them. Later, General Anwar's elder uncle Raja Aurangzeb Khan made peace with the British, by seeking employment under Col. Warburton for the settlement and development of the newly irrigated agricultural lands, and the establishment of the newly planned town of Lyallpur. Subsequently, General Anwar's father, Khan Bahadur Raja Muhammad Fazaldad Khan, served in the 12th Cavalry of the British Indian Army for 35 years, and rose to be the Indian commander. (On his retirement Raja Fazaldad Khan became the leading horse and cattle breeder and agricultural land developer in the Lyallpur (Faisalabad)/Jaranwala and Sahiwal/Okara areas of undivided Punjab). General Anwar's cousin Raja Muhammad Sarfraz Khan, who was the eldest son of Raja Aurangzeb Khan, helped redeem the position of the family at Chakwal, and became a prominent politician of the Muslim League and a close friend and associate of the Quaid-e-Azam and Allama Muhammad Iqbal. Raja Sarfraz Khan was also an agriculturist par-excellence and well known for his foresight, philanthropy and socio-development work.

Out of General Anwar's nine brothers, three brothers chose civilian careers (Baqir, Tahir and Masud). Raja Muhammad Baqir Khan, died very young as a law student at Cambridge University UK, when he met with a motorcycle accident. Raja Tahir Raza Khan became an international lawyer, and Raja Masud Raza Khan was a psycho-analyst of international repute, and many of his books are still being used as text-books at leading universities in the UK, US and France. Tahir and Masud were settled in London. His maternal first cousins include Air Chief Marshal Agha Zulfiqar Ali Khan, Lt Gen Agha Saadat Ali Khan, Lt Gen Agha Nek Muhammad and Senator Dr Nighat Agha. General Anwar's only son, Engr Raja Idrees M. Anwar was Chief Research Officer and Director General of the National Institute of Electronics. His eldest sister's granddaughter is Dr Maleeha Lodhi.

== Education ==
After early schooling at Lahore, young Anwar Khan was selected as a cadet at the age of 12 years, in the Prince of Wales Royal Indian Military College (RIMC) in Dehra Dun (India). He was in the Kitchener Section, as were some of his elder brothers. He became the "Cadet Captain" (Senior Prefect) and was awarded 'colours' in cricket and hockey, and won the 'Best Athlete' cup. It was reported a few years ago, that some of his athletic records at RIMC remain unbroken. He was also awarded the 'Silver Medallion' for efficiency in swimming by the Royal Life Saving Society London. He obtained the Chiefs College Diploma and stood first in all the 'cadet colleges' in India, for which he was awarded the "Sir Pratap Singh Memorial Prize".

A very keen photographer, he took photographs whilst at RIMC with his own camera at the opening ceremony of the Indian Military Academy (IMA) Dehra Dun. These became the official photographs of IMA, because the ones taken by the professional photographer came out bad owing to some problem with the pro-camera.

He obtained the 'Civil Engineering' degree with 'Honours' from the Thomason College of Civil Engineering, Roorkee (India), and was awarded the "Olympic Cup" for representing the college at all games, namely; Cricket, Hockey, Football, Tennis and Squash. The principal described him as "a rare combination of brain and brawn".

In February 1934 he was selected for the 4th batch at Indian Military Academy (IMA) Dehra Dun. He passed the 1st Class P.T. and was awarded the "silver spurs" in horse-riding, and represented the IMA in cricket and athletics. He was awarded the "Norman Gold Medal" for standing first in the final examination and was runner-up for the Sword of Honour award, when he passed out on 3 June 1936. However, his seniority in the army was considered from 1 November 1935, as British cadets at Sandhurst did 18 months course, as compared to 30 months at IMA Dehra Dun.

== Army service ==
He was the first Muslim to be selected for Engineers, and posted to 31 Field Troop in the King George's Own, Bengal Sappers and Miners Roorkee in July 1936, where he did a "Basic (Combat) Engineering Course". He volunteered for the South Waziristan operations where he served at Wana from Jun-Sep 37 in the 4th Field Company, and learned practical road and bridge making during operations. The local pathans admired him and were very pleased to see a Muslim working as an Engineer officer. Subsequently, he served in various Engineer units of the 7th Division, with postings and operational duties in Rawalpindi, Batrasi, Shinkiari and Nowshera. He was in 5 Field Company at Rawalpindi from Aug 39 to Jul 40, 7 Field Company from Sep 40 to Mar 41. Adjutant 7th Division Engineers from Mar 41 to Feb 43. Lt Col H. Barker was the Commander Royal Engineers for both Troops and MES Rawalpindi and 7 Division camp at Batrasi Camp, Hazara. The roads and water supply were built by him in two months for Div HQ Batrasi, one brigade at Bakrial, one brigade at Hamsherian and British gunners at Shinkiari. In Dec 42, the 7th Division crossed on a country boat bridge built by Engineers at the site of now Tarbela Dam and camped at Nowshera. In Jan 43 the 7th Division moved to Chhindwara in Central India for training in jungle warfare, as Rommel had been defeated in North Africa, and no more desert warfare was anticipated. From Feb-Jul 43 he attended the Command and Staff College Quetta and was awarded PSC on graduation.

During World War II, he spent 3 years in the Burma operations in 23rd Engineer Battalion and was "mentioned in despatches" for his service and was promoted to Lt.Col. During this period he was involved in various military combat engineering operations, such as building roads, wooden (tank crossing) bridges, forward airfields, river jetties etc. in Arakan-Akyab area in 1944 and from Assam right through Burma to Rangoon. In Arakan-Akyab area, along the sea, they were a SEAC unit, where tank wooden crossings were often damaged by "lifting" at high tide. He was 2nd in-command to Lt Col Sandeman and built roads, bridges and jetties for inland transport. During a voyage from Chittagong towards Akyab a tornado hit their small ship, with waves going over the ship, it developed a list of 15 degrees for about 20 minutes, but luckily the eye of the storm abated, and they sailed safely to the shore. After a year, 23 Engr Bn was shifted to Assam and came under 15 Corps, and made bridges roads and forward airfields, enabling the troops to advance to Rangoon. He was promoted to Lt.Col on 23 Aug 45 at Toungoo, on the way to Rangoon, where he rebuilt the bombed out Mingladon (Rangoon) airfield in 21 nights, whilst keeping it operational during daytime.

On return from Burma in Nov 46 he did a special Commander Royal Engineers' (CRE's) course at Roorkee and was posted as Garrison Engineer Meerut in Jan 47 for four months training. After this he was appointed Asst Comdt of the Bengal Sappers and Miners (S&M) Roorkee to prepare for Partition. On 12 August 47, he went to Rawalpindi and Sialkot with his Commandant Col Conner for reconnaissance, and celebrated Pakistan's Independence on 14 August 47 at Sialkot. On 16 Aug 47 he started his journey back to Roorkee (now in hostile India) by train from Rawalpindi, which was diverted from Lahore to Ludhiana via Ferozpur. All stations en-route were full of armed belligerent killers, but luckily the train was not attacked along the way.

- From Roorkee he went to New Delhi on 3 Sep 47, for the sharing of Engineer property. E-in-C India agreed that Pakistan's share of one-third of the total should only be from Roorkee, which included the mess silver. (Later India-Pakistan Joint Defence Council changed the rules, but by then we had taken most of our share). On 7 Sep 47 when he and his family went to Willingdon airport (Delhi) for flying to Lahore, timely information allowed them to leave the airport just before the biggest killing of Muslims at the airport. He returned to the airport an hour later, but another miracle saved him during a renewed killing attack. This process was repeated on subsequent days, but on 10 Sep 47 he and his family (wife and young son) were safely evacuated to Karachi from Palam airport (Delhi), and then to Rawalpindi by RPAF aircraft.

He moved to Sialkot and established the new Engineer Centre. Meanwhile, back at Roorkee, Maj J. A. Faruqi (later Major General) arranged to send Pakistan's share of equipment etc. to Sialkot. Later in Oct 47 an MT convoy headed by Capt Tufail Ahmed (later colonel) brought most of Pakistan's share from Roorkee to Sialkot. The Indians stopped the convoy and ordered it to be unloaded near Amritsar (as according to the new rule, MT was not to be moved across borders). After a vehement and heated argument with the Indians, the convoy was eventually allowed to go through to Lahore.

Pakistan's Corps of Engineers was now fully established and the new motto was "Rooheh-Rawan". The Engineers Centre and School of Military Engineering (SME) were set up at former British barracks in the north of Sialkot. Both became fully functional in a very short time. The big task was to integrate the Bengal S&M with the Bombay S&M personnel, but the "Pakistan feeling" was so strong and overwhelming, that unity was soon achieved. Their first task was in dealing with Indian excursions on the border. During this period Lt Col Anwar was the Asst. Commandant of the Engineer Centre and SME. After a year the Comdt Col Conner went on long leave and he acted as Comdt from 7 Jul 48 to 22 Nov 48 as a full Colonel. (Later as Dy E-in-C he moved both the Centre and School to Risalpur, to ensure training on bridging rivers etc.).

On Connor's return, being the senior most Pakistani engineer officer he was posted to GHQ for training ---- Five months as AAG(org) in AG's branch (22 Nov 48 – 6 May 49) and then GSO I (SD) for four months in GS branch, directly under Maj Gen Hutton. The property division with India was again argued, because of the new Joint Partition Council rules and E-in-C (Gen Sir Millis Jefferies), Col Connor and Col Anwar flew to New Delhi in Apr 49, but the final decision was to observe a "status quo". For further training he was posted on 1st Sep 49 as CMES Rawalpindi - in those days covering: Pindi, Abbottabad, Murree, Jhelum, Sargodha, Mianwali and Attock.

In early 1950 he was posted as Dy E-in-C in the rank of Col. The then E-in-C, Maj Gen Veitch, made him fully responsible for all future planning of officers and men. For training purposes he was sent in March 51 to School of Military Engineering (SME) Chatham (UK), Military College of Science, Loughborough College (UK), Survey training centre (UK), Transport training centre (UK) and BAOR (West Germany).

He was promoted to Brigadier in 1951. In 1955 he went to Jordan, as head of a mission from Pakistan, at the marriage of King Hussein. Subsequently, he visited Damascus and Beirut. In 1956 he visited USA Corps of Engineers Centre at Fort Belvoir and the Waterways Research Centre at Vicksburg.

During the period as Dy E-in-C he fixed the ratio of 75% Engr officers and 25% civilian officers in the Military Engineering Service (MES). He also made and arranged to implement the decision, to remove or transfer to other arms, any engineer officer found unfit for the Corps of Engineers.

All Azad Kashmir roads and bridges were planned by him and work executed by the Corps of Engineers. A road had been planned to be built along the Indus River through Chilas and Gilgit, but for many months no progress was made on the project because Pak PWD, NF PWD and AK PWD said that it was not possible to build it. Gen Veitch asked him (Brig Anwar) to consider if the project could be implemented by the Corps of Engineers. He accepted the challenge, and sent Maj Safdar and a captain as a reconnaissance party, and they walked through dangerous territory until they reached Chilas. From there they took a jeep to Gilgit and reported that it was indeed a difficult but a feasible project. The Secretary Communications Mr Khursheed said that he could only allow them to spend Rs 75 lakhs on the project. The Corps of Engrs started work on building the road. This was one of his most significant achievements, as he was personally involved in planning, designing and supervising the building of a "jeep road on a 3 tonner alignment", along the Indus River through Chilas and Gilgit, within the meagre budget of only Rs 75 lakhs. This road was eventually widened and extended to China as the Karakoram Highway - a superb feat of engineering by any international standards. (This task was accomplished by FWO, a special force later raised for such projects by the Corps of Engineers). He also contributed towards the building of all military cantonments, especially at Wah, Kharian and Multan. Similarly he provided technical advice for Satellite Town Rawalpindi and the new capital city of Islamabad.

He was promoted to Maj Gen in 1957 as E-in-C -- a post he held for 8 years. Under his command the Corps of Engineers became one of the finest bodies of professional combat engineers anywhere in the world. This was proved initially, when Pakistani Engineer officers who participated in military engineering courses in the US, were in the top 10 percent of the class. They were competing with officers from other countries as well as US army engineer officers. The fact was further vindicated when retired and serving officers of the Corps of Engineers excelled in whichever assignment they were given, and in any military or civilian organisations they subsequently joined.

On 1 May 1965 he retired from the Army, and Maj Gen J.A. Faruqi took over.

== Other distinctions ==
After retiring from the Pakistan Army, Maj General Anwar Khan was subsequently appointed Managing Director and Chairman of the Oil and Gas Corporation for four years, during which oil was struck at Tut near Taunsa, DG Khan, and gas near Karachi and in the then East Pakistan. Despite strong resistance from some quarters, he bought a large industrial plot in 1968 in I-9 Islamabad at a rate of Rs 10/- per sq yd, and a commercial plot in the Blue area for HQ office at an equally low rate. The value of this urban property is extremely high today.

His strategy and mission at OGDC was to make Pakistani engineers, technologists and scientists learn and apply the skills and technologies required for attaining the highest level of competence and expertise, in all disciplines and specializations including the petroleum industry. This strategy continues to be driven by the current day OGDCL.

He was one of the founders of the Institute of Engineers Pakistan (IEP), and later elected as its President three times. He used to get the maximum number of votes from East-Pakistanis, and was one of those West-Pakistanis who were very highly admired and respected by them. He was made a Life Fellow of IEP and later given the Lifetime Achievement Award for his many contributions to the engineering profession.

For many years he was the President of the Rawalpindi Division Cricket Board and the Rawalpindi Division Hockey Board, and responsible for nurturing world class players and sportsmen. He captained the Pakistan Army Cricket Team (as a brigadier in the 1950s), and continued to bowl at an extremely fast pace, more accurately than most others who were many years younger to him, during the time when the test cricketer Imtiaz Ahmed was captain of the Pakistan Airforce Cricket Team.

== Awards and decorations ==
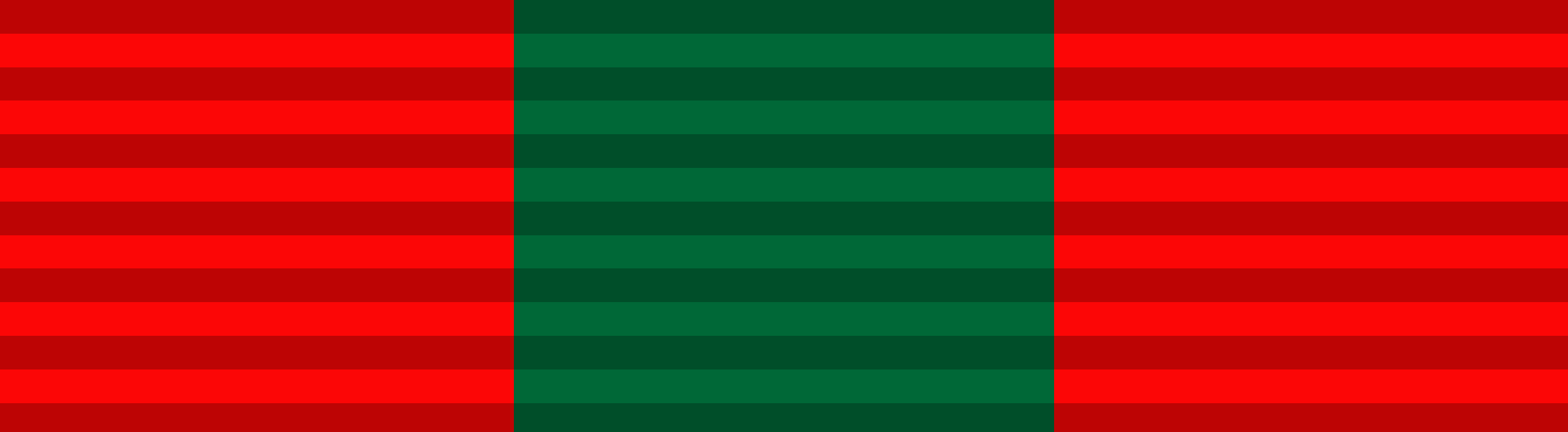

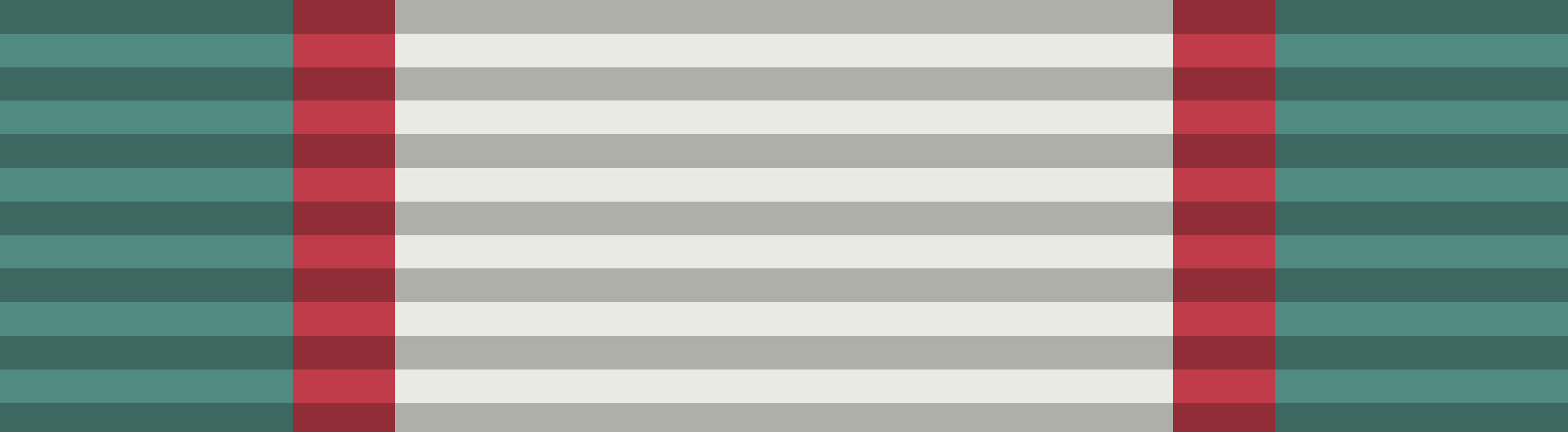

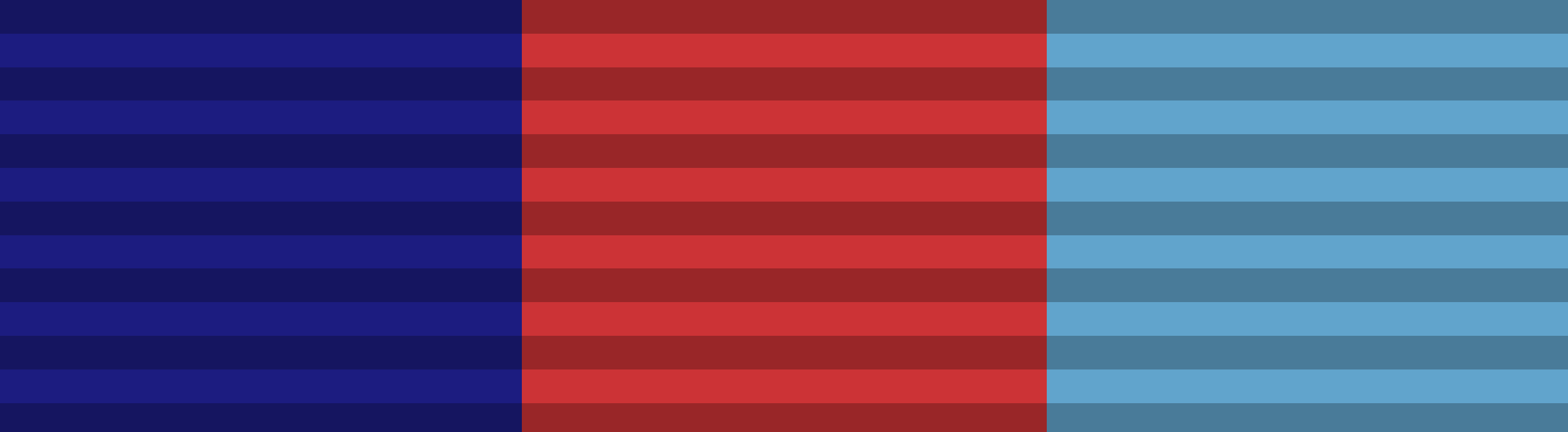

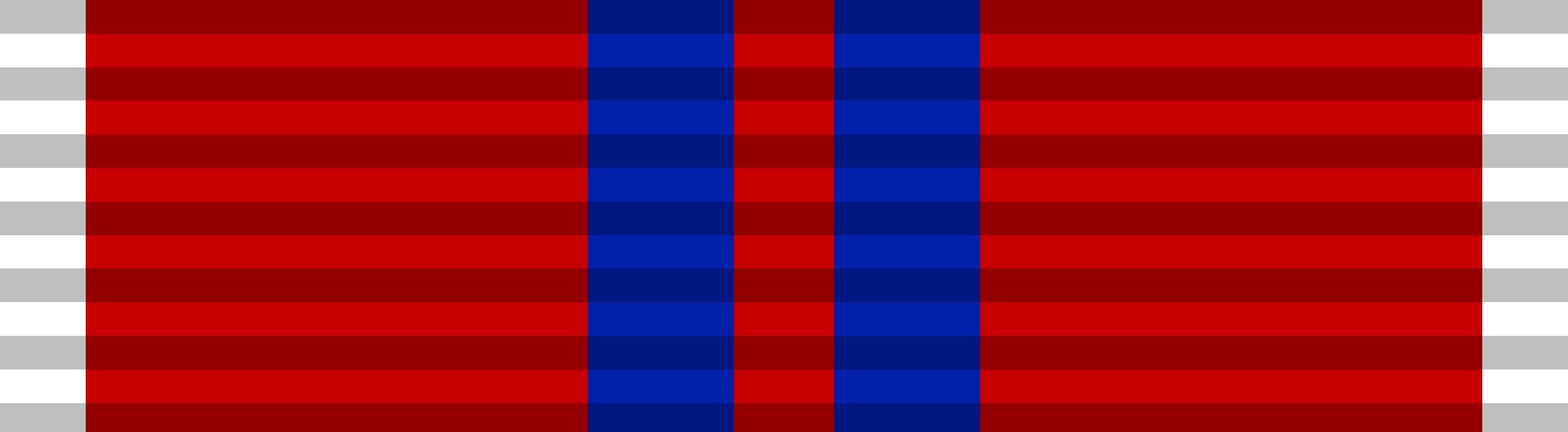

	Hilal-e-Jurat (Crescent of Courage) 1965 War		
Pakistan Tamgha (Pakistan Medal) 1947	Tamgha-e-Jamhuria (Republic Commemoration Medal) 1956	India General Service Medal (1936) North West Frontier 1937–39 Clasp	1939-1945 Star
Burma Star	War Medal 1939-1945	India Service Medal 1939–1945	Queen Elizabeth II Coronation Medal (1953)

=== Foreign decorations ===
Foreign Awards
UK	India General Service Medal (1936)
UK	1939-1945 Star
UK	Burma Star
UK	War Medal 1939-1945
UK	India Service Medal 1939–1945
UK	Queen Elizabeth II Coronation Medal
