= Rashtriya Indian Military College =

Coordinates: 30°20′54″N 78°1′29″E

- Official logo of RIMC
- Dehradun; India

Information
- Former name: Prince of Wales Royal Indian Military College
- Type: Military College
- Motto: Bal Vivek (Strength and Conscience)
- Established: 13 March 1922; 104 years ago
- Founder: Prince of Wales Edward VIII
- Commandant: Colonel Rahul Agarwal
- Staff: 22
- Grades: Classes 8–12
- Gender: Boys and Girls
- Age: 11.5 years to 13 years
- Enrollment: 250 cadets
- Campus size: 138-acre (0.56 km^{2})
- Campus type: Urban
- Colours: Light blue and dark blue
- Feeder to: National Defence Academy, Indian Naval Academy
- Affiliation: CBSE BOARD
- Alumni: Rimcollians
- Sections: Pratap, Ranjit, Shivaji and Chandragupta
- Website: https://rimc.edu.in

The Rashtriya Indian Military College (Note: transl. National Indian Military College) (abbreviated RIMC; founded as the Prince of Wales Royal Indian Military College) is a military school for boys and girls situated in Doon Valley, Dehradun in India. The RIMC is a feeder institution for the National Defence Academy, Indian Naval Academy and subsequently the Indian Armed Forces. Rimcollians, the name by which alumni of the RIMC are usually denoted, have gone on to hold the highest ranks in the Army, Navy and the Air Force of India, Pakistan and Bangladesh.

== History ==
The origins of RIMC, formerly the Prince of Wales Royal Indian Military College, lie in the long-pending demand of Indian nationalists to Indianise the officer cadre of British Indian Army. The first concrete step towards Indianisation of the officer cadre came from Viceroy Lord Curzon, in his "Memorandum on Commissions for Indians" on 4 June 1900. Against much opposition he had established the Imperial Cadet Corps first at Meerut and then at Dehradun in 1901. This Imperial Cadet Corps (ICC), popularly known in the Doon Valley as the Rajwada Camp, was the forerunner to the present day RIMC.

During the recruiting drives, especially in Punjab, which was the main recruiting area and provided one third of the strength of the Army, people were cajoled and even threatened to join the Army. Michael O'Dwyer, the Lieutenant Governor of the Punjab during the World War I had toured from district to district exhorting the martial races to come forward. The promise of commission was the most effective way to get more Indians to join the Army. On 4 May 1918 he reiterated, " As regards the further grant of King's Commissions the Government of India have already made their proposals before the Home Government and we may be sure they will receive early and sympathetic consideration."The demand to Indianise the officer cadre grew more strong in the post World War I years, and finally resulted in the formation of the Military Requirements Committee by Lord Rawlinson, the commander-in-chief in 1921. Based on the recommendations of this committee and the proposal by Lt Gen Sir John Shea, it was decided to open a pre-Sandhurst institution in the old campus of the Imperial Cadet College with a capacity of 27 cadets. It was meant as a military school for training the Indian boys for an entry into the Royal Military College, Sandhurst. The British believed that to be officers in the British Indian Army, the Indian boys had to be first given British public school education before sending them for pre-commission training.

Finally, the PWRIMC was inaugurated in March 1922. Edward, Prince of Wales, inaugurated the school on 13 March 1922, naming it the Prince of Wales Royal Indian Military College (PWRIMC). The name was changed in 1947 to RIMC when India became independent. The prefix of Prince of Wales was dropped, and Royal Indian Military College became Rashtriya Indian Military College, and thus the PWRIMC became RIMC, retaining the essence and spirit of the original name.

It was located on the premises of the Imperial Cadet Corps (also called Rajwada Camp), set amidst 55 hectares (140 acres) of lush-green countryside adjacent to the Garhi Village in Dehradun Cantonment. The purpose of the school was to provide boys with education and training for the Indians being sent to the Royal Military Academy, Sandhurst, as part of the Empire's policy to make the officer cadre of the Indian Army more indigenous. RIMC was intended as a feeder institution to Royal Military Academy, Sandhurst along the lines of an English public school.

The government order appointed a military commandant of the rank of lieutenant colonel, a civilian headmaster, senior or junior British masters and Indian masters. The first commandant was Lt Col H.L. Haughton of the Sikh Regiment who took charge of the college on 22 February 1922. JGC Scott was appointed headmaster and the first group of British masters were JM Allen, CA Phillips and Kittermaster. The First Adjutant & Quarter Master was Risaldar (Honorary Captain) Sardar Khan of 20 Lancers. The first mess contractors were MS Hazir and Co and the mess staff consisted mostly of Goans. Later the mess was taken over by the Army Service Corps. Hira Lal Atal was the first Cadet Captain and later as Adjutant General of the Indian Army, He was responsible for designing India's highest award for bravery in combat, the Param Vir Chakra, of which the first recipient was another Old Boy of the college Major Somnath Sharma. Among the early cadets were K.S. Thimayya, Asghar Khan and others, who had illustrious military careers.

An excellent account of the life in early days of RIMC can be found in book Thimayya of India by Humphrey Evans, while accounts of the Imperial Cadet Corps can be found in numerous books written by ex Royals, particularly from Rajputana.

After India gained independence in 1947, the school continued to train young men to become a part of the Indian Armed Forces. The major difference is that instead of serving as a public school whose boys joined the RMA, RIMC now offers an excellent public school life, oriented towards joining the NDA and INA.

To celebrate the 75th anniversary of Rashtriya Indian Military College, Dehra Dun (1922–1997) 2.00 "Cradle of Excellence" stamps were produced; The First Day Covers were issued on 13 March 1997. The college celebrated its centenary on 13 March 2022, making it the oldest officer training institution of Indian Armed Forces.

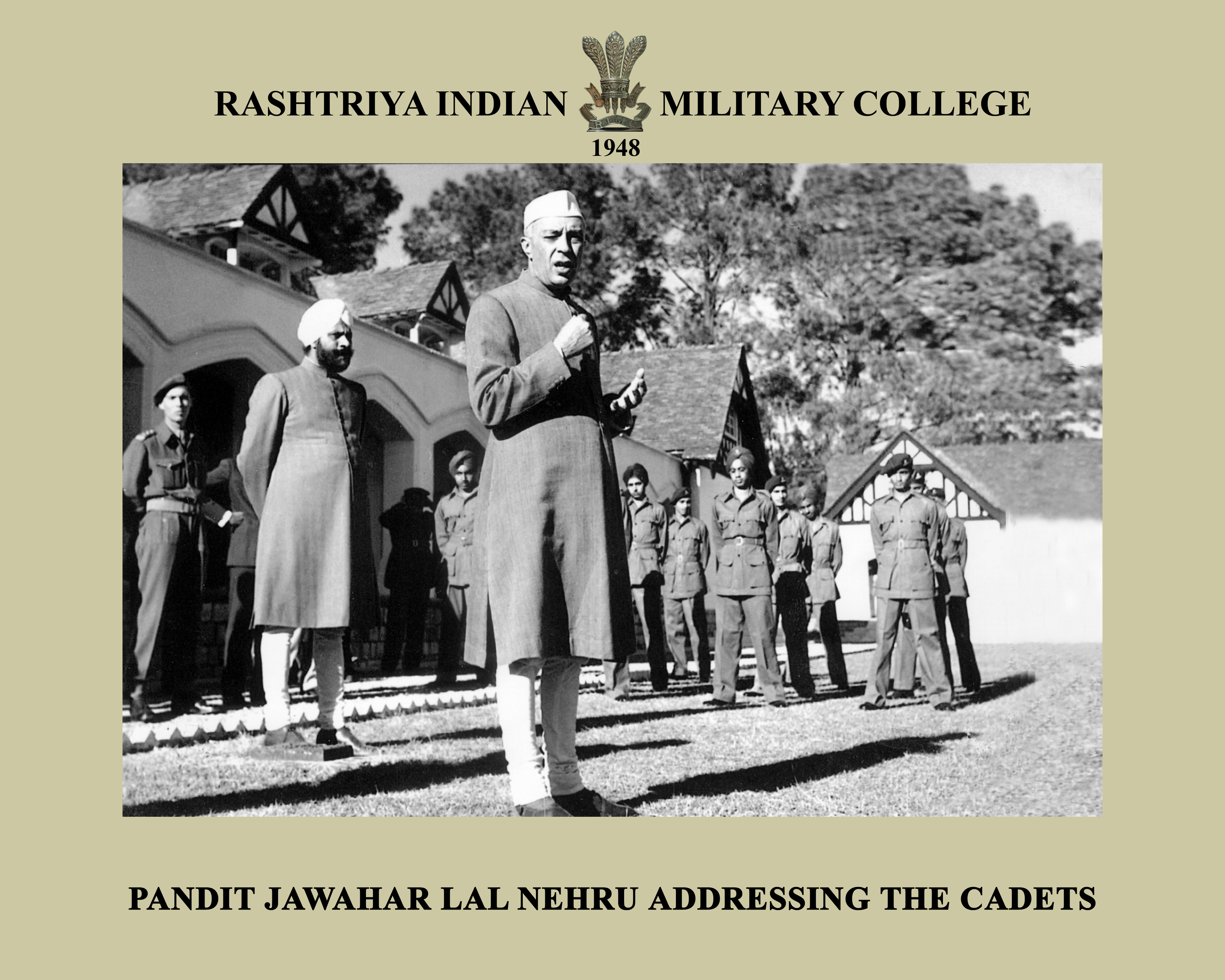
Pandit Jawaharlal Nehru at RIMC

== Institutional framework ==
The school is spread over 54 hectares (139 acres) and has an enrollment of 250 cadets. A Hawker Hunter jet aircraft gifted to the college by Air Chief Marshal Nirmal Chandra Suri is placed in front of the Cadet Mess. Recently a Sea Harrier presented to RIMC by the navy was inaugurated by the Commander-in-Chief, Andaman and Nicobar Command (CINCAN) Bimal Verma.It is located in front of the Thimayya auditorium.

RIMC has a 1:14 teacher student ratio. Candidates for the school are selected from all over India through a national level competitive exam, the RIMC Entrance Exam that is held twice a year in each state. Successful candidates in the entrance exam have to go through a medical fitness test to be admitted to the school. Every year about 50 students are selected in two intakes from all over India and admitted into Standard VIII at the RIMC.

The PWRIMC in 1922 was run on the lines of an English public school.. The 37 cadets forming the first batch were divided into three Houses, called Sections at the RIMC, These were called Rawlinson, Lord Roberts and Kitchener named after the three Commander-in-Chiefs of India.

Hira Lal Atal who was also the first cadet at RIMC was appointed the first College Cadet Captain with Ali Asghar Khan, Tara Singh and Sheikh Hussain the first Section Commanders, or House Captains, of the three Sections. After Independence in 1948, the names of the three Sections were changed to Pratap, Ranjit and Shivaji from the former Rawlinson, Roberts and Kitchener. The new names represented the three great Indian warriors Maharana Pratap, Maharaja Ranjit Singh and Chhatrapati Shivaji. Numbers at the college increased significantly in 1960 and it was decided to keep the new entrants in a Holding Section to give them a chance to settle down.

In 1965, the strength of the college rose to 200 and it became necessary to turn the Holding Section into a new House, which was called the Chandragupta Section after the Indian Emperor Chandragupta Maurya.

Cadets at the RIMC follow the 10+2 pattern curriculum of Indian Central Board of Secondary Education (CBSE), New Delhi over the next five years. A cadet, during his stay at the RIMC, gets a full glimpse of the life of an Indian Armed forces Officer. RIMC is the only school to hold board exams twice a year.

Cadets sports include hockey, football, cricket, basketball, Volleyball, squash, boxing, swimming, athletics, tennis and gymnastics. Horse riding and rifle shooting are other popular activities. After the cadets complete the 12th grade, they graduate from the RIMC and most of them join the Indian Armed Forces by entering the National Defence Academy, Pune.

The cadets then spend three years at the NDA with other students from the rest of the country and eventually get commissioned as officers in the Indian Armed Forces after one final year in their assigned service academy.

== Academics ==
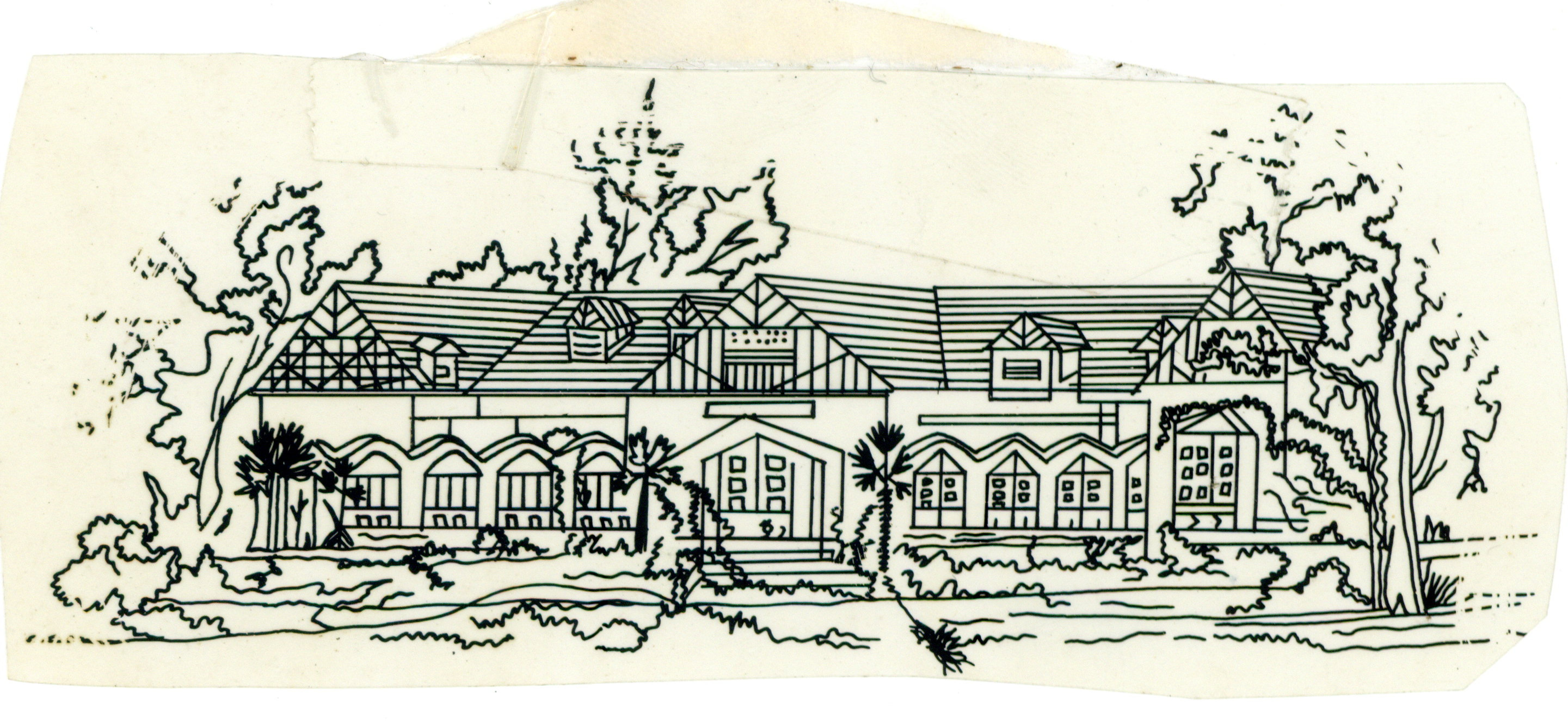
Sketch of Academic Block

Rashtriya Indian Military college is administered by the Union Ministry of Defence, through the Army Training Command, Shimla. RIMC (Limca Book of Records confirm) is perhaps the only institution in the country where exams for Class X and XII are conducted twice a year, in May and November. These exams/certifications are recognized by CBSE. The college offers only the science stream at the +2 level along with Informatics Practices. However, to prepare cadets for the UPSC examination for entry into NDA, Social Sciences are also taught.

After the term end examination, each Cadets position in class is decided; both curricular and extracurricular achievements of a term are recorded in his dossier. Weightage is given to the sessional work done by a cadet both in terms of class work and homework for his promotion to the next class. Cadets are prepared for the UPSC Examination for entry to the NDA.On Average RIMC has sent between 70 and 80% cadets to NDA from each course (as compared to the national average which stands at 0.6%).RIMC has two terms both of which run on the same syllabus line and has remedial quid pro quo for qualifying measures.

== Admission ==
25 Cadets are admitted every six months. Rashtriya Indian Military College conducts an admission process in Class VIII. Candidates are studying in Class VII and the age of the candidate must be between 11.5 and 13 years at the time of commencement of term. The written examination consists of a test paper consisting of three parts: English (125 Marks), Mathematics (200 Marks), and General Knowledge (75 marks). Candidates have to score at least 50% in each subject to qualify. Candidates are then shortlisted through the written test and called for Viva-Voce which is of 50 marks, and have to pass a medical test.

== Notable alumni ==
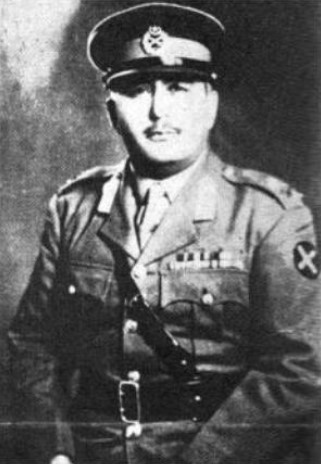
Lt. Gen. Azam Khan, Governor of East Pakistan

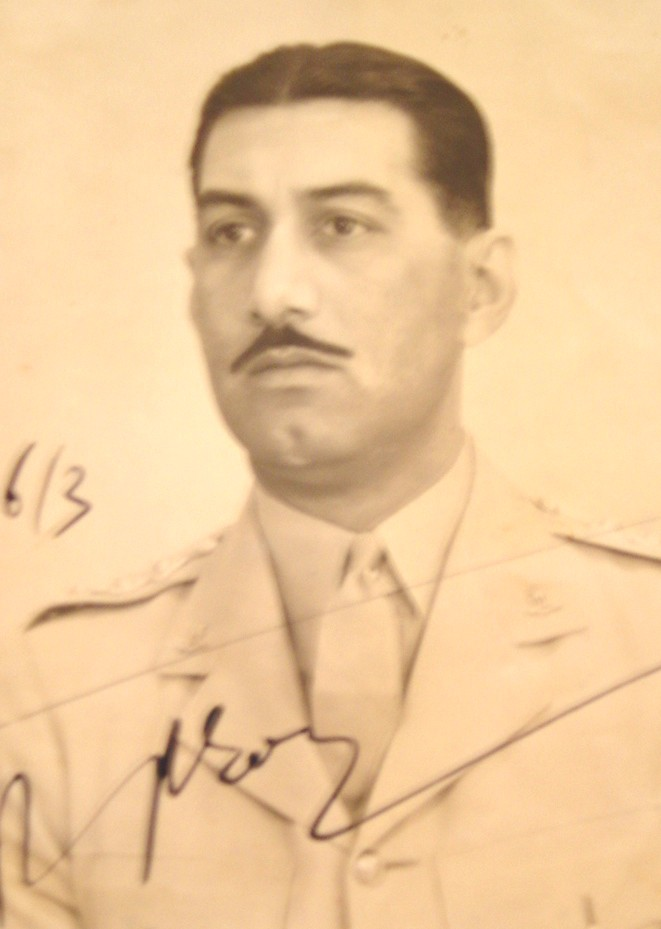
Maj. Gen. (then Captain) Iftikhar Khan, first native Commander-in-Chief designate of the Pakistan Army

Lt.Gen. Premindra Singh Bhagat, recipient of Victoria Cross

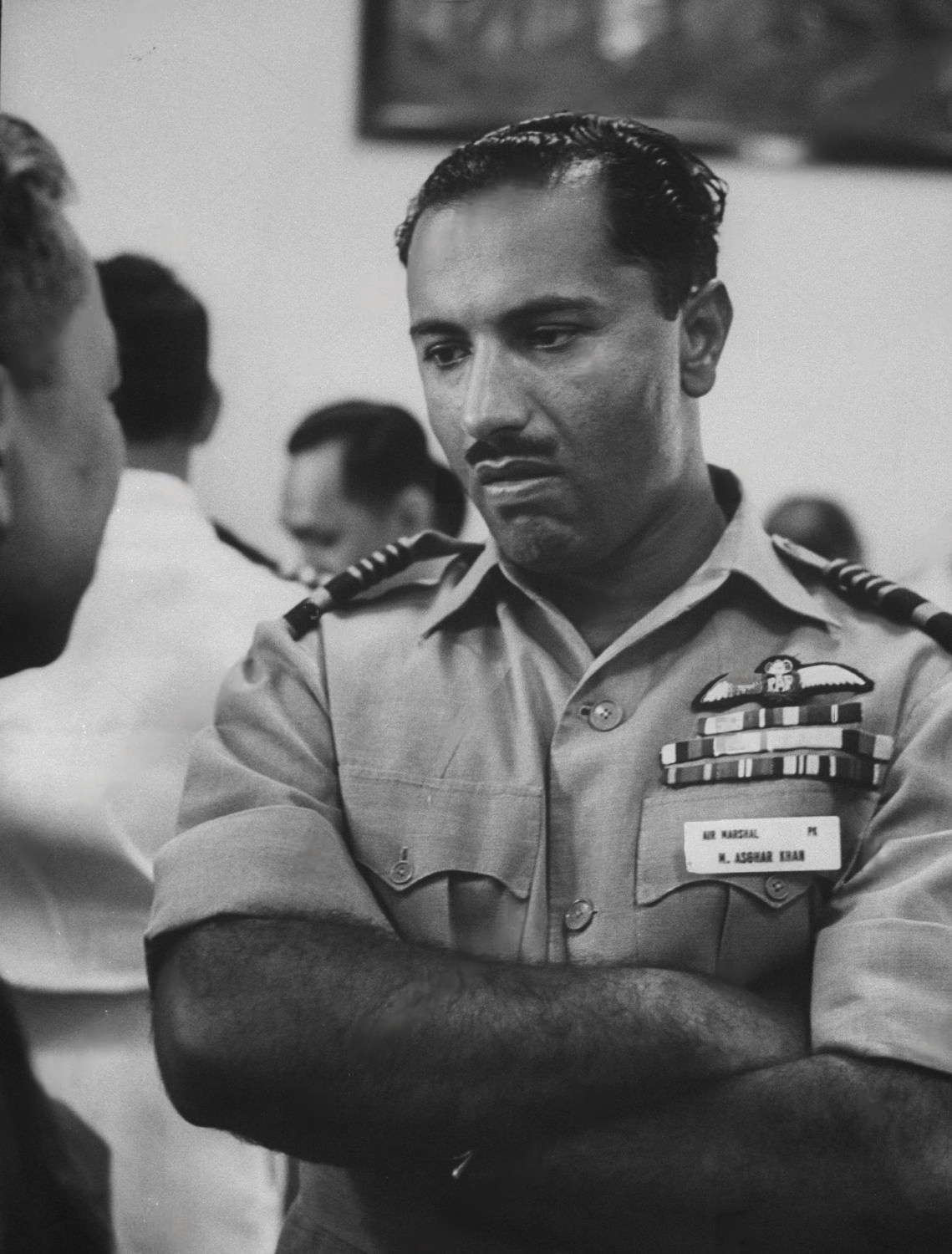
Air Marshal Asghar Khan, first pilot from the Indian subcontinent to fly a fighter jet, the Gloster Meteor III and the first native Commander-in-Chief of the Pakistan Air Force

Alumni of the RIMC are called "Rimcollians". Rimcollians have held exalted positions in the Armed Forces, many becoming the Chiefs of Staff in the Indian and Pakistani Armed Forces. The cadets enrolled at RIMC are known as "Rimcos" to distinguish them from the alumni. A rare distinction of the RIMC is that some of its alumni have also headed the Armed Forces of Pakistan, a feat made possible by Rimcollians of the pre-partition Subcontinent era.

The RIMC has produced five Army Chiefs, four of the Indian Army - General's K. S. Thimayya, Sundararajan Padmanabhan, G.G Bewoor, Vishwa Nath Sharma, and one of the Pakistan Army - Lt. General Gul Hassan Khan. It has also produced four Air Chiefs, two of the Indian Air Force - Air Chief Marshals N.C. Suri and B. S. Dhanoa, and two of the Pakistan Air Force - Air Marshal Asghar Khan and Air Marshal Nur Khan.

Other senior officers include: Major General Iftikhar Khan, Lt. Gen Azam Khan, Lt. Gen Khwaja Wasiuddin, Maj Gen Muhammad Anwar Khan, Lt. General Sahabzada Yaqub Khan, Lt. Gen. Fazle Haq, Maj Gen Balbir Singh Malik, (Note: IMA Sword of Honour 1955, former Commandant Armoured Corps of Indian Army)) Maj Gen Dewan Misri Chand, Maj Gen Kanwar Zorawar Singh, Maj Gen M R Rajwade, Maj Gen Karam Singh, (Note: Indian Army, Dogra Regt, Ex - Dy Adjutant General)) Lt Gen H M Khanna, (Note: (Indian Army - GOC-in-C Command)) Lt Gen N S Brar, (Note: Indian Army - Artillery, GOC Corps; Administrative Member Armed Forces Tribunal)) Lt Gen S. K. Singh, Lt Gen Gautam Dutt, (Note: (Indian Army - Engineers, Engineer-in-Chief) Lt. Gen. Chandi Prasad Mohanty, Lt. Gen. Amardeep Singh Bhinder, Lt Gen JS Varma, (Note: (Indian Army, GOC-in-C)) and Air Marshal D.C. Kumaria.

Gallantry awards have been awarded to Rimcollians including the Victoria Cross to Lieutenant General Premindra Singh Bhagat; the Distinguished Service Order to General K. S. Thimayya and Brigadier Vidya Dhar Jayal, and the Param Vir Chakra to Major Som Nath Sharma.

Royals were highly inspired by the college, and most royals from Indian Princely States joined the college. Jagaddipendra Narayan Bhup Bahadur (15 December 1915 – 11 April 1970), Maharaja of Cooch Behar State was an alumnus of the college. The Colonel Sawai Maharaj Sahib Shri Deshpal Singh Ju Deo of Ajaigarh cousin of H.H. Sawai Maharaja Punya Pratap Singh Sahib Bahadur of Ajaigarh passed out from the same and was classmate of General GG Bewoor.

Cadets namely Piyush Sunil Deshmukh (Equestrian), Jaikant Mishra (Mountaineering), Praveen Kumar (Mountaineering) have earned the "Chief of Army Staff Commendation Card" for achievements in their fields respectively during their tenure at the school itself. The school has an alumni network called the Rimcollian Old Boys Association (ROBA), founded in 1949 by then Major General Hira Lal Atal. ROBA has been conducting alumni meets since then. However the official registration of the ROBA as a society was shaped in year 2000. Today this membership stands at 2808. The Rimcollian Journal, the Website, The Rimcollian E-Group and the Centennial Series Calendars are the vital branches of the ROBA. The alumni also have mailing groups on the internet through which they interact.

Recently organised 2000 Millennium Reunion was attended by 140 Rimcollians. At the General Body meeting, the millennium volume Coffee Table Book, ‘Cradle of Bravery’ was released by Dr NM ‘Appa’ Ghatate. Edited and conceived by senior journalist Sidharth Mishra.

On 14 March 2022, a book titled 'Valour & Wisdom: 100 Years of Unparalleled Leadership' has been came out. This historical compendium informs readers about actual and exciting aspects of history based on a variety of facts, figures, and numbers that are typically unknown to readers. The book is fittingly authored by 26 Rimcollians and edited by Air Marshal PP Reddy (retd) and senior journalist Sidharth Mishra.

== Sports ==
Sports and games played at RIMC include boxing, football, cricket, athletics, horse riding, hockey, squash, swimming and shooting. RIMC has produced International level sportspersons in the games of squash, shooting and horse riding.

It has produced great squash players like Nishkal Dwivedi, Brig. Raj Manchanda and Lt Col Shakti Singh. Alumni Poshuk Aluwalia has represented India in shooting in 2010 SAF games at Dhaka where he won a medal.

RIMC alumni Piyush Sunil Deshmukh also represented India in an International Horse Show at Sydney, Australia. He fetched four medals at a young age of just 16 years. Achudev S an alumnus of RIMC and a cadet at NDA had represented India in the International Services Athletic Meet in Turkey.

RIMC alumni Cdr Abhishek Kankan, NM ( Gallantry) (Retd), summited Mt Everest on 19 May 2004 as part of record creating Indian Naval Expedition which was flagged off from a dived Submarine. Later two more Rimcollians have summited Mt Everest.

RIMC has also been adjudged India's best school in sports education by The Times Magazine.

RIMC has a 50-metre Olympic-size swimming pool, an indoor swimming pool, five basketball courts, three squash courts, and numerous football and hockey fields.

Major Ashish Malik also represented India at the 2018 Asian games and won a team silver medal there

== Section system ==
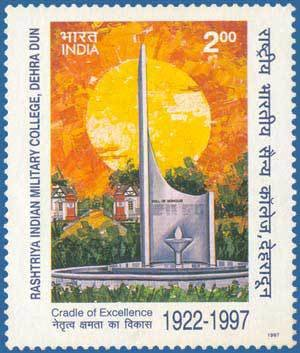
Stamp of India 1997 Rashtriya Indian Military College Dehra Dun

The school is divided into four sections. Each cadet is assigned a section at the start of his time in the school and will remain in that section for their whole tenure. These sections were earlier called Rawlinson, Kitchener and Roberts and the new names were given in the post-independence years. Each section is looked after by one Section Master (called Section Master) who is assisted by one or two Section Tutors. There is fierce competition between the sections which well continues for the rest of the life among the Old Boys or the Rimcollians.

The sections are:

Section	Section colour
Pratap	
Ranjit	
Shivaji	
Chandragupta	

== See also ==
- List of Rimcollians
- National Cadet Corps (India) (NCC)
- National Police Cadet Corps (India) (NPCC)
- National Service Scheme (NSS)
- Rashtriya Military Schools (RMS)
- Sainik School
