= Mohammad Zafar Khan =

Brigadier Mohammad Zafar Khan

Personal details
- Born: 1908
- Died: 3 December 1983 (aged 74–75)

Military service
- Branch/service: British Indian Army (1934-1947); Pakistan Army (1947-?)
- Rank: Brigadier
- Unit: Remount Veterinary Corps (1934-1947); Pakistan Army Corps of Remount Veterinary and Farms (1947)

Mohammad Zafar Khan (Note: Urdu: محمد ظفر خان; Sometimes spelled Mohammed Zafar Khan) was a one-star rank officer of the Pakistan Army who served as the Director of the Corps of Remount Veterinary and Farms in the 1950s and 1960s."

== Personal life ==
Mohammad Zafar Khan had 13 siblings, nine brothers and four sisters. His older brothers were Major Generals Mohammad Akbar Khan, Iftikhar Khan, and Muhammad Anwar Khan.

== Military career ==
=== British Indian Army ===
Mohammad Zafar Khan was commissioned into the British Indian Army in 1934.

=== Pakistan Army ===
After General Ayub Khan took over as Commander-in-Chief in 1951, he focused on the military farms. According to Major General Fazal Muqeem Khan, Brigadier Mohammad Zafar Khan as the Director of Remount, Veterinary and Farms, "eagerly began to develop plans which were subsequently to help the nation."

In his 1963 book "The History of the Royal Army Veterinary Corps, 1919–1961," Brigadier J. Clabby expressed his gratitude to Brigadier Zafar Khan for arranging the placement of a replica of the Royal Army Veterinary Corps badge in the rock of the Khyber Pass. The monument commemorated the alliance between the Royal Army Veterinary Corps (RAVC) and the Pakistan Veterinary Corps, as well as the RAVC officers who had served on the Frontier.
