= Dipankar Banerjee (general) =

Indian Army officer

- Allegiance: India
- Branch: Indian Army
- Rank: Major General

Dipankar Banerjee is a retired major general of the Indian Army based in India. He is the founding director of the Institute of Peace and Conflict Studies (based in Indian capital New Delhi).

== Military career ==
Bannerjee is an alumnus of the prestigious RIMC (Rashtriya Indian Military College). Banerjee served in the Indian Army for 36 years from 1961 until his voluntary retirement in 1997. He was commissioned into the 2nd Battalion The 1st Gorkha Rifles and later commanded 5th Battalion The 1st Gorkha Rifles. During his service he held many key command, staff and instructional appointments in India, including command of 8 Mountain Division in Kashmir. He attended the Staff College in Camberley, UK. His last active command in the army was as the Divisional Commander during 1992–1993. He has been an instructor at the Indian Military Academy, the College of Combat and the Defence Services Staff College in India. In recognition of his distinguished service to the Indian Army, Banerjee received the prestigious military honour Ati Vishisht Seva Medal (Highly Distinguished Service Medal) from the President of India.

== Academic career ==
Banerjee served as the deputy director of the Institute for Defence Studies and Analyses, India’s premier defence and security studies think tank, where he was also a senior fellow. He then founded in 1996 the Institute of Peace and Conflict Studies, where he still serves as the director. From May 1999 to July 2002 he was the director of the Regional Centre for Strategic Studies in Colombo, Sri Lanka. He held visiting fellowships at the United States Institute of Peace and The Henry L. Stimson Center, Washington, United States. He has been a consultant to the United Nations on the Conventional Arms Register and was an international adviser to the International Committee of the Red Cross during 2000–2004.

== Research interests and publications ==
His special areas of interest are South Asian foreign policies and security issues, confidence building measures, Asia-Pacific security with a special emphasis to Chinese security issues. He has published extensively on these subjects in books, periodicals and journals. He has edited the following books:

- Comprehensive and Co-operative Security in South Asia (1998)
- Confidence Building Measures in South Asia (1999)
- CBMs in South Asia – Potential and Possibilities (2000)
- South Asia at Gunpoint: Small Arms and Light Weapons Proliferation (2000)
