= Masud Khan =

British psychoanalyst (1924–1989)

Mohammed Masud Raza Khan
- Born: 21 July 1924; Jhelum, Punjab Province, British India (now Pakistan)
- Died: 7 June 1989 (aged 64); London, England
- Known for: Concept of cumulative trauma
- Scientific career
- Fields: Psychoanalysis

Mohammed Masud Raza Khan (21 July 1924 – 7 June 1989) was a Pakistani-British psychoanalyst. His training analyst was Donald Winnicott. Masud Raza Khan was a protege of Sigmund Freud's daughter Anna Freud, and a long-time collaborator with Donald Winnicott.

== Biography ==
=== Family background ===
Named Ibrahim at birth, Khan was born in Jhelum in the Punjab, then part of British India, now in Pakistan. His father, Fazaldad (c. 1846-1943), was a Shiite Muslim of peasant birth who had been richly rewarded by the British for the family's support and military service during the conquest of the region, and became a wealthy landowning zamindar, adopting the name "Khan Bahadur Fazaldad Khan." He farmed, specializing in the breeding and sale of horses to the British in the army and for polo. He married four times (his first wife was a cousin, from whom he divorced due to infertility; the third wife died at a fairly young age), and had nine sons and several daughters.

Masud Khan's mother, Khursheed Begum (1905-1971) was Fazaldad's fourth wife, whom he married when he was 76 and she was claiming to be seventeen. Masud Khan was ashamed of the marriage because she was an opium-addicted courtesan and "former dancing girl" with an illegitimate son. Khan referred to his father as "normally a cruel and authoritative feudal lord", observing him to be "a gaunt, bleak, monumental presence, either utterly still or raging in wild temper" for whose affection his sons competed and by whom they were disciplined with beatings, Masud, the youngest, was the only one to escape this form of punishment but nevertheless subjected to his father's high expectations and verbal chastisement. Khan, however, never criticized his harsh parenting, observing himself to have been "brought up an indulged child under an iron discipline". The marriage of Fazaldad Khan and Khursheed Begum — considered inappropriate due to his old age — caused friction with Fazaldad's second wife and their eldest son and heir, Akbar, who took her to live with him at Lahore.

=== Early life ===
Masud Khan was raised with his older brother Tahir and his younger sister Mahmooda on his father's estate in the Montgomery District. His father was an alcoholic, while his mother was "erratic." At age four, he became selectively mute because "an indisposition of his mother caused him so much anxiety," a state that lasted three years.

They moved to Lyallpur when Khan was 13, where, at seventeen, an "attachment to a Hindu girl" was sufficiently controversial that he was no longer allowed to see her. At this time, he briefly entered psychotherapy, which he said did not help. His sister Mahmooda died of tuberculosis in 1942.

He was not allowed to see much of his mother during his early years, but after his father died in 1943, when Khan was 19, he went to live with her. An estrangement between them had arisen in Khan's youth, when she struck him for criticizing her late return from her ancestral home. Khan considered her a simple woman with a tendency to "anxious chatter" and became distant from her as he grew up.

Khan stated that he was groomed as his father's heir from the age of four, accompanying Fazaldad in conducting estate business and watching him preside over the local court. Before this, he commented his father "hardly knew" him. His father's favorite child — Mohammed Baqar, different from his brothers, military men, in being an intellectual — was killed in a motorcycle accident aged 19 when a student at Oxford, the year before Khan's birth. Fazaldad encouraged Khan to "take Baqar's place as the family intellectual".

=== University years ===
Khan attended the University of Punjab at Faisalabad and Lahore from 1942–5. He obtained his BA in English literature, and his MA for a thesis on James Joyce's Ulysses.

Khan acquired his double Masters in English Literature and Psychology and in 1946 moved to Oxford to study at Balliol College. While he actually sought a personal analyst, when he met John Bowlby in London, the latter assumed he was applying to the British Psychoanalytic Association to be trained as an analyst. His first training analyst was Ella Sharpe, who died nine months later. He completed his training analysis under John Rickman, and stayed with him in analysis until 1951, the year Rickman died. Khan qualified as an analyst at the age of 26, in 1950; and as a child analyst in 1952 under the supervision of Winnicott. In 1955, he became head of the Library of the British Psycho Analytical Society, a post he retained until 1975. After Rickman's death, Khan went into analysis with Winnicott, which lasted for 15 years, until 1966. Khan was devastated to discover after Winnicott's death that he had not been made the analyst's literary executor.

=== Later life ===
In his later life Masud Khan's share of his father's vast estate was managed by his mother's illegitimate son Salahuddin ("Salah"; 1914-1979). In 1956, Masud Khan, his brother Tahir, and their stepbrother Salah, built a cinema, the Rex, in Lyallpur. After the collapse of the Pakistani cinema industry in the 1980s it became the Masud Super Market and Rex Hotel. Khan was forced to sell half the land surrounding his estate and pay a cash settlement to people claiming to own parts of the land being sold in 1971, diminishing his wealth.

==== Alcoholism, psychosis, and cancer ====
Over the course of the 1970s, Khan became a severe alcoholic. Biographer Linda Hopkins writes, "By 1971, or possibly earlier, he was alcohol dependent and by 1975, alcohol was destroying his life." In 1976, he was diagnosed with throat cancer and underwent a lung resection. He experienced delusional psychosis in the late 1970s, believing at one point that he was Prince Myshkin from Dostoevsky's The Idiot. Upon developing Stage Four cancer in 1987, he underwent a laryngectomy and had his trachea removed; by this point, he had also become acutely agoraphobic.

He died at his home in London on June 7, 1989. There was no memorial service, and no professional obituary appeared before 1992.

== Work ==
His contributions include the concept of cumulative trauma, first articulated in 1953. On this subject, Khan writes:

... cumulative trauma is the result of the breaches in the mother's role as a protective shield over the whole course of the child's development, from infancy to adolescence - that is to say, in all those areas of experience where the child continues to need the mother as an auxiliary ego to support his immature and unstable ego-functions.

Khan built on Winnicott's work, and proposed ideas such as that of secrecy as a potential space. Another concept is that of "lying fallow", a state of mind entered by the patient after prolonged clinical work in which a metabolization of psychic transformation occurs.

He produced a number of papers highlighting perversions as stemming from a split within the personality and the acting out of disturbed object relations collected in his book Alienation in Perversions.

He spent twenty years working for the International Journal of Psychoanalysis as, variously, Reviews Editor, Associate Editor, and consultant. He was Co-Foreign Editor of, and contributor to, the Nouvelle Revue de Psychanalyse.

Reviews of his work as an analyst were mixed. He had a reputation for succeeding with clients other therapists had failed to help. Adam Phillips enjoyed his time as Khan’s patient. In 2001, former patient Wynne Godley wrote in the London Review of Books that Khan had been an abusive, imperious therapist to him.

== Reception ==
Khan was protegé of Anna Freud and a long-time collaborator with D. W. Winnicott. Anna Freud insisted that Khan understood her father's work better than anyone else and spoke in defense of her star pupil whenever he aroused the British Psycho-Analytical Society's ire.

=== Controversy ===
Khan's position in the British Psychoanalytical Society as training analyst gave him legitimacy, while at the same time he became less and less adherent to psychoanalytic guidelines with boundary violations, including socialising and entering sexual relationships with some of his students and analysands. A crisis at the 1965 Amsterdam Congress, the annual meeting of the International Psychoanalytical Association, "produced the wrath of many senior colleagues" and marked the beginning of his professional decline.

He lost his status as training analyst in 1977 and was later expelled from the British Psychoanalytical Society after the publication of his last book When Spring Comes (1988), which includes a lengthy case study of a Jewish patient he calls "Mr. Luis," in which he makes extensive remarks about the "Judaic-Yiddish-Jewish bias of psychoanalysis" and includes overtly antisemitic ranting in describing his work with the patient. The Society believed him to be responsible for a series of bomb threats after his expulsion.

In his later years he signed his name as Prince Raja Khan, explaining he had inherited the title from his ancestors.

== Personal life ==
Khan was married initially to the dancer Jane Shore; he later divorced her and in 1959 married ballerina Svetlana Beriosova; they divorced in 1974. Together with Beriosova he led a prominent social life in a London scene which included well-known figures such as actress Julie Andrews, photographer Zoë Dominic, actor Peter O'Toole and members of the Redgrave family.

=== Character ===
Khan wrote in his Work Books that he inherited his shyness, sensitivity, and warmth from his mother, and from his father, an "imperious capacity for work and a terrible temper." He had a slight deformity, a "deformed and oversized" right ear that stuck out, of which he was very conscious, later taking to wearing a beret to hide it, until Winnicott persuaded him to have it fixed in 1951.

Khan was described as tall, handsome with charm and sex appeal, he was known as charming, charismatic and infamous for impromptu flashes of psychoanalytic insights given randomly to people met at social occasions. His paradoxical and highly unpredictable nature was summarised by his close friend and colleague, the French psychoanalyst, Victor Smirnoff, who wrote at his death:

Certainly was an unusual man: gifted, beautiful, rich, intelligent. But he was also cunning, boastful, narcissistic, stingy, prejudiced and cruel. He was a strange, talented, sometimes disquieting analyst. But he had style, taste and flair. And he was a faithful friend. Requiescat in pace.

== Bibliography ==
- Khan, Masud (1974). The Privacy of the Self. Karnac Books: London.
- Khan, Masud (1979) Alienation in Perversions. Karnac Books: London, ISBN 978-0-946439-62-1.
- Khan, Masud (1983) Hidden Selves: Between Theory and Practice. Karnac Books: London.
- Khan, Masud (1988) When Spring Comes: Awakenings in Clinical Psychoanalysis. Chatto and Windus: London.
  - US version: Khan, Masud (1989). The Long Wait: And Other Psychoanalytic Narratives. Summit Books.
- Khan, Masud (2022). Diary of a Fallen Psychoanalyst. The Work Books of Masud Khan 1967-1972. Edited by Linda Hopkins and Steven Kuchuck. Karnac Books: London.
