= Mohammad Said Hamid Junid =

Indonesian filmmaker

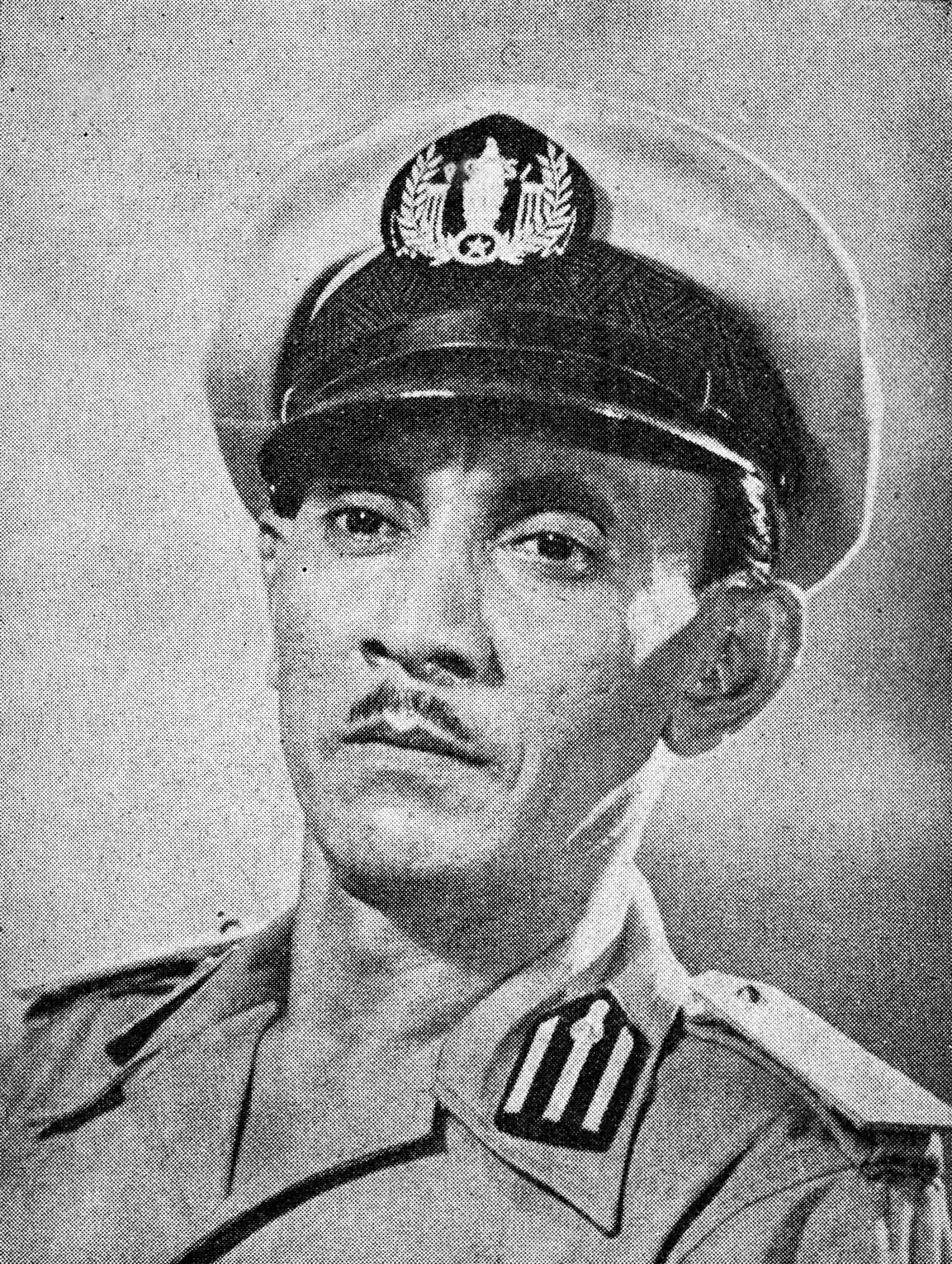
- Said as Commissioner Winata in Inspektur Rachman (1950)
- Born: 17 June 1902; Rengat, Riau, Dutch East Indies
- Died: 1972 (aged 69–70); Jambi
- Other names: Moh. Said HJ
- Known for: Filmmaking

Mohammad Said Hamid Junid (17 June 1902 – 1972), often credited as Moh. Said HJ, was a film director, storywriter, and actor active in the early cinema of Indonesia. After an unsuccessful career in the theatre he directed some nineteen films, beginning with Boenga Sembodja in 1942.

== Early life ==
Said was born in Rengat, Indragiri, Dutch East Indies, on 17 June 1902. He attended school until age seventeen, when he dropped out and joined a shipping agency. Dissatisfied with this, not long afterwards Said became crew on a merchant freighter, a position which he held for several years. Around 1925, after his ship had landed at Surabaya, Said joined the Sandiwara Royal Poesie Indra Bangsawan drama troupe. Over the next seventeen years he would act with numerous troupes and tour the archipelago, once taking several months to work on a farm. By 1942 his most recent troupe, Boon's Toneel, was closed for showing overly politicised stageplays. Usmar Ismail, later known as a director, suggests that Said saw numerous disappointments during his theatrical career, leading to him often changing troupes.

In 1942, not long after the Japanese occupied the Indies, Said made his directorial debut with Boenga Sembodja, a film featuring music and dance sequences. After this film Said began working with the Japanese, at the Eiga Haykyusha Ai in Bandung, before joining Fred Young's Bintang Surabaja Troupe.

== Film career ==
Said returned to the film industry in the late 1940s, writing and directing Aneka Warna and Menanti Kasih. Aneka Warna was a comedy starring Mochsin and R. Busono which followed two bumbling actors in a search for money. Menanti Kasih, meanwhile, followed a man named Husni Anwar who had to marry his benefactor's daughter to repay a debt of honour; featuring an early song by Bing Slamet, it starred Chatir Harro and Nila Djuwita.

After the Dutch recognised Indonesia's independence in 1949, the country's film industry saw an increase in the number of films. The early 1950s were Said's most productive. Aside from acting in Ratna Asmara's 1952 film Dr Samsi, Said directed sixteen films in six years, writing most and also acting in some of them. These included the dramas Untuk Sang Merah-Putih (1950), which followed a doctor blinded during the national revolution, and Sungai Darah (1954), following a dukun's efforts to isolate his community to ensure his own power. Said also continued to direct comedies, including Dunia Gila, which followed a man who becomes his father's uncle-in-law, and Guga Guli (1953), which showed a young prince switching roles with his bodyguard to escape marriage.

By the late 1950s Said's productivity had declined. After Saidjah Putri Pantai in 1956 he wrote only one more film, DKN 901, in 1962. The work, cowritten with Arqamar, followed a young man who takes over command from his father when the latter dies. Said died in Jambi in 1972 at the age of 70.

== Filmography ==
Said acted in seven films between 1949 and 1962. He had previously made his directorial debut in 1942, directing a total of nineteen films.

Actor

- Tjitra (Image; 1949)
- Inspektur Rachman (Inspector Rachman; 1950)
- Untuk Sang Merah-Putih (For the Red and White; 1950)
- Dr Samsi (1952)
- Saputangan Sutra (Silk Glove; 1953)
- Djaja Merana (1954)
- Sampah (Garbage; 1955)
- Dibalik Dinding Sekolah (Behind the School Walls; 1961)

Crew

- Boenga Sembodja (Plumeria; 1942) – Director
- Aneka Warna (Many Colours; 1949) – Director and story
- Menanti Kasih (Waiting for Lover; 1949) – Director and story
- Inspektur Rachman (Inspector Rachman; 1950) – Director
- Pantai Bahagia (Happy Beach; 1950) – Director
- Untuk Sang Merah-Putih (For the Red and White; 1950) – Director
- Bakti Bahagia (Happy Duty; 1951) – Director
- Dunia Gila (Crazy World; 1951) – Director
- Surjani Mulia (The Great Surjani; 1951) – Director and story
- Pahlawan (Hero; 1951) – Director and story
- Rumah Hantu (Ghost House; 1951) – Director and story
- Guga Guli (1953) – Director and story
- Kemajoran (1953) – Director
- Srigala Topeng Hitam (Wolf in the Black Mask; 1953) – Director
- Djaja Merana (1954) – Director and story
- Sungai Darah (River of Blood; 1954) – Director
- Tengah Malam (Midnight; 1954) – Director and story
- Sampah (Garbage; 1955) – Director
- Saidjah Putri Pantai (Saidjah the Beach Maiden; 1956) – Director and story
- DKN 901 (1962) – Story
