= Mahendra Singh =

Mahendra Singh may refer to:

- Mahender Singh, Indian politician
- Mahendra Singh of Patiala (1852–1876), Maharaja of Patiala
- Mahendra Pal Singh (legal scholar) (1940–2026), Indian lawyer
- Mahendra Pal Singh (politician), Indian politician
- Mahendra Singh (soldier), Indian soldier, recipient of Kirti Chakra and Sena Medal
- Mahendra Kumar Singh, Indian politician from Uttar Pradesh
- Mahendra Singh Bhati, Indian politician
- Mahendra Singh Dhoni (born 1981), Indian cricketer
- Mahender Singh Gurjar, Indian politician
- Mahender Singh Khadakvanshi, Indian politician
- Mahendra Singh Mahra, Indian politician and agriculturist
- Mahendra Singh Mewar (1941–2024), Indian politician from Udaipur
- Mahendra Singh Pal (born 1949), Indian politician from Uttarakhand
- Mahendra Singh Patel (born 1968), Indian politician
- Mahendra Singh Sisodia, Indian politician
- Mahendra Singh Sodha (born 1932), Indian physicist
- Mahendra Singh Tikait (1935–2011), Indian leader of farmers

== See also ==
- Mahindra (disambiguation)
- Mahendrasinh Baraiya (born 1978), Indian politician from Gujarat
- Mahendrasinh Chauhan, Indian politician
- Mahendrasinh Parmar, Indian Gujarati writer
- Mahendrasinh Rana, Indian politician
- Mahendrasinh Vaghela, Indian politician from the Bharatiya Janata Party
