= Mahindra =

Mahindra may refer to:

== Business ==
- Mahindra & Mahindra, an Indian multinational car manufacturing corporation
  - Mahindra Truck and Bus Division, an Indian commercial vehicle manufacturer owned by Mahindra & Mahindra
- Mahindra Group
- Kotak Mahindra Bank, an Indian bank

== People ==
- Mahinda (Buddhist monk), the son of Emperor Ashoka and proponent of Buddha's teachings in Sri Lanka
- Mahindu, 10th century Chahamana king of north-western India

== Places ==
- Mahindra World City, integrated business cities in India
  - Mahindra World City, Jaipur, India
  - Mahindra World City, New Chennai, India
- Mountain Mahindra or Three Peaks Mountain, in Indian Himalaya, Himachal Pradesh
- Mahendra Mountains, a mountain range described in Indian epics, identified with the Eastern Ghats
- Mahendragiri (disambiguation)

== Schools ==
- Mahindra École Centrale, a private engineering institute located in Bahadurpally, near Hyderabad, India
- UWC Mahindra College or Mahindra United World College of India, an international school near Pune in Maharashtra, India
- Mohindra College, an institution of contemporary higher learning in Patiala, Punjab, India

== Sports ==
- Mahindra Hockey Stadium, field hockey stadium at Mumbai, India.
- Mahindra Racing, Indian motorracing team
- Mahindra United, an Indian football club

== People with the surname ==
- Anand Mahindra (born 1955), chairman and managing director of the Mahindra Group
- Jagdish Chandra Mahindra (c. 1892–1951), Indian industrialist and co-founder of Mahindra & Mahindra in 1945, with K. C. Mahindra and Malik Ghulam Mohammed
- Kailash Chandra Mahindra (c. 1894–1963) cofounder of Mahindra & Mahindra
- Keshub Mahindra (1923–2023), Chairman Emeritus of the Mahindra Group, including Mahindra & Mahindra Limited

== See also ==
- Mohendra (disambiguation)
- Mahinder (disambiguation)
- Mahinda (disambiguation), Pali form of the name
- Mahindra College (disambiguation)
- Mahendra, an Indian male given name, also Mahindra
- Mahendra Singh (disambiguation)
- Mahendran (disambiguation), alternative form of the given name
- Mahendru, an Indian surname
