= Mahinder =

Mahinder may refer to:

- Mahinder Garh, usually written Mahendragarh, a town in Haryana, India
- Mahinder Tak (or Mahinder Kaur Tak) (1946-), a co-chair of the Democratic National Committee 's Indo-American Council
- Mahinder Kapoor, or Mahendra Kapoor (1934-2008), an Indian playback singer
- Mahinder Dehlvi, a composer for the 1978 film Giddha
- Mahinder Pal Gupta, the son of the Indian freedom fighter Ram Prakash Gupta
- Mahinder and Maya are the characters in the 1987 Indian film Ijaazat and its popular song Mera Kuchh Saamaan
- Mahinder, fictional character portrayed by Kamal Kapoor in the 1977 Indian film Tyaag

== See also ==
- Mahindra (disambiguation)
