= Mahendra Singh (soldier) =

Recipient of Kirti Chakra

Subedar Major and Honorary Captain Mahendra Singh KC, SM
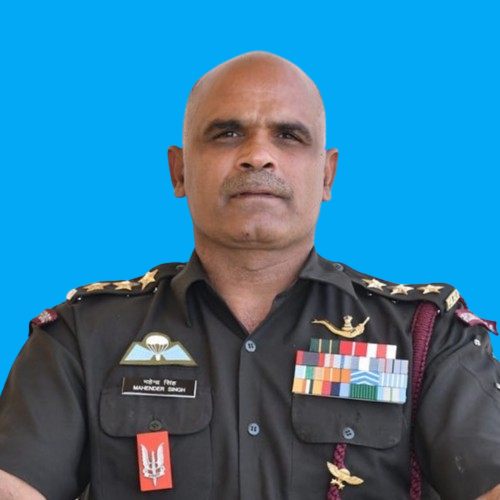
- Portrait of Sub Maj (Hony Capt) Singh
- Born: Jhunjhunu, Rajasthan, India
- Military career
- Allegiance: India
- Branch: Indian Army
- Rank: Subedar Major Honorary Captain
- Service number: JC-413444W
- Units: 9 Para SF; 6 RR
- Awards: Kirti Chakra; Sena Medal (Gallantry)

Subedar Major and Honorary Captain Mahendra Singh, KC, SM is a decorated Indian Army Junior Commissioned Officer (JCO) of 9 Para SF. During an operation, he was paralysed on one side of his body.

== Military career ==
On October 21, 1990, Mahendra Singh of Jhunjhunu's Dumra village joined the Special Forces 9th Battalion The Parachute Regiment. Subedar Singh's career expanded over twenty years in the Indian Army. He participated in number of encounters with the hardcore terrorists in many operations.

On the night of September 2, 2015, the operative team of the 6 RR Battalion was scouring the Kupwara jungles for four terrorists. The terrorists started shooting. This resulted in the deaths of two terrorists. Many bullets pierced Subedar Major Mahendra Singh's intestine and spine during this time. Even though he was paralysed due to spinal injuries, he killed the terrorist. His injured companion was bravely rescued.

== Sena Medal ==
Singh was awarded with the Sena Medal (gallantry) for tackling the terrorists in the Independence Day 2013. In 2013, he has killed a Pakistan Regular Army personnel who have breached the Line of Control.

== Kirti Chakra ==
On the Republic Day, 2016 Subedar Singh was awarded India's second highest peacetime gallantry award the Kirti Chakra for his gallant act on 2 September 2015.

On the 2 September 2015 night, Subedar Mahendra Singh got informed about the heavy gunfire between the terrorists and his team in Darel forest at Kupwara district of Jammu & Kashmir. He also informed that during fire two soldiers were hit by enemy bullets and they were badly injured. After hearing this news, Subedar Mahendra Singh and Lance Naik Mohan Nath Goswami went to rescue his teammates who are still fighting to the terrorists. When they reached the place there was a heavy firing from the terrorist. Immediately Subedar Mahendra Singh fired back and killed a terrorist at close quarters by risking his life. He was facing heavy gunfire from the terrorist group after this incident. Subedar Singh determined to kill remaining terrorists to save his teammates. Unfortunately he was hit in his abdomen that results he became paralyzed from toes to waist. At this condition he killed one more terrorist at point blank range. After his inspiration Lance Naik Mohan Goswami went and killed remaining terrorists.

In this operation Lance Naik Mohan Nath Goswami martyred and Subedar Mahendra Singh became half body paralyzed.

For the courageous act, bravery and supreme sacrifice Lance Naik Goswami was awarded with the nation's highest gallantry award the Ashoka Chakra and Subedar Mahendra Singh was awarded with the Kirti Chakra.
