= V Sreehari =

Lieutenant General in the Indian Army

Lieutenant General V. Sreehari AVSM, SC, SM
- Born: Wandoor, Malappuram, Kerala, India
- Military career
- Allegiance: India
- Branch: Indian Army
- Service years: June 1987 – 31 August 2026
- Rank: Lieutenant General
- Units: 16 Sikh Light Infantry; Parachute Regiment
- Awards: Ati Vishisht Seva Medal; Shaurya Chakra; Sena Medal

Lieutenant General V. Sreehari, AVSM, SC, SM is a retired general officer of the Indian Army. He last served as the General Officer Commanding of the Dakshin Bharat Area. A decorated Parachute Regiment (Special Forces) officer, he has extensive operational and staff experience, including command tenures in counter-insurgency, high-altitude warfare and peacekeeping operations.

== Early life and education ==
Sreehari hails from Wandoor in Malappuram district, Kerala. He went to school at Sainik School Amaravathinagar in Tamilandu and is a second generation military officer, as his father had served in the Indian Navy as a petty officer. He is an alumnus of the National Defence Academy, Khadakwasla and the Indian Military Academy, Dehradun. He holds an M.Sc. in Defence Studies, a Master's in Management Studies from Osmania University, and an MPhil from the Madras University.

== Military career ==
Commissioned into the 16 Sikh Light Infantry in 1987, Sreehari later volunteered for the elite Parachute Regiment (Special Forces). Over the course of his career spanning more than three decades, he has served in diverse operational environments including high-altitude postings and counter-insurgency operations in Jammu and Kashmir and the Northeast.

He commanded a Para SF battalion during Operation Rakshak, the Base Camp at the Siachen Glacier, and a Mountain Division in the northeastern sector. He also served as part of the United Nations Mission in the Democratic Republic of the Congo, contributing to peacekeeping operations under the UN mandate.

His staff and administrative appointments include serving as Director General (Recruiting), Director General (Manpower Planning & Personnel Services) at Headquarters Eastern Command. He has also held key appointments within the Assam Rifles framework, serving as Deputy Inspector General (Personnel) at the Directorate General of Assam Rifles.

On 1 August 2025, Sreehari assumed charge as General Officer Commanding Dakshin Bharat Area, succeeding Lieutenant General Karanbir Singh Brar.

== Awards and decorations ==
Lieutenant General Sreehari has been awarded the Shaurya Chakra while serving at the 31 Rashtriya Rifles. He was also awarded the Sena Medal, and Ati Vishisht Seva Medal for gallantry and distinguished service. He has been awarded the Chief of Army Staff Commendation Card and the Chief of Integrated Staff Committee Commendation Card as well.
