= Japura Airport =

Japura Airport Bandar Udara Japura
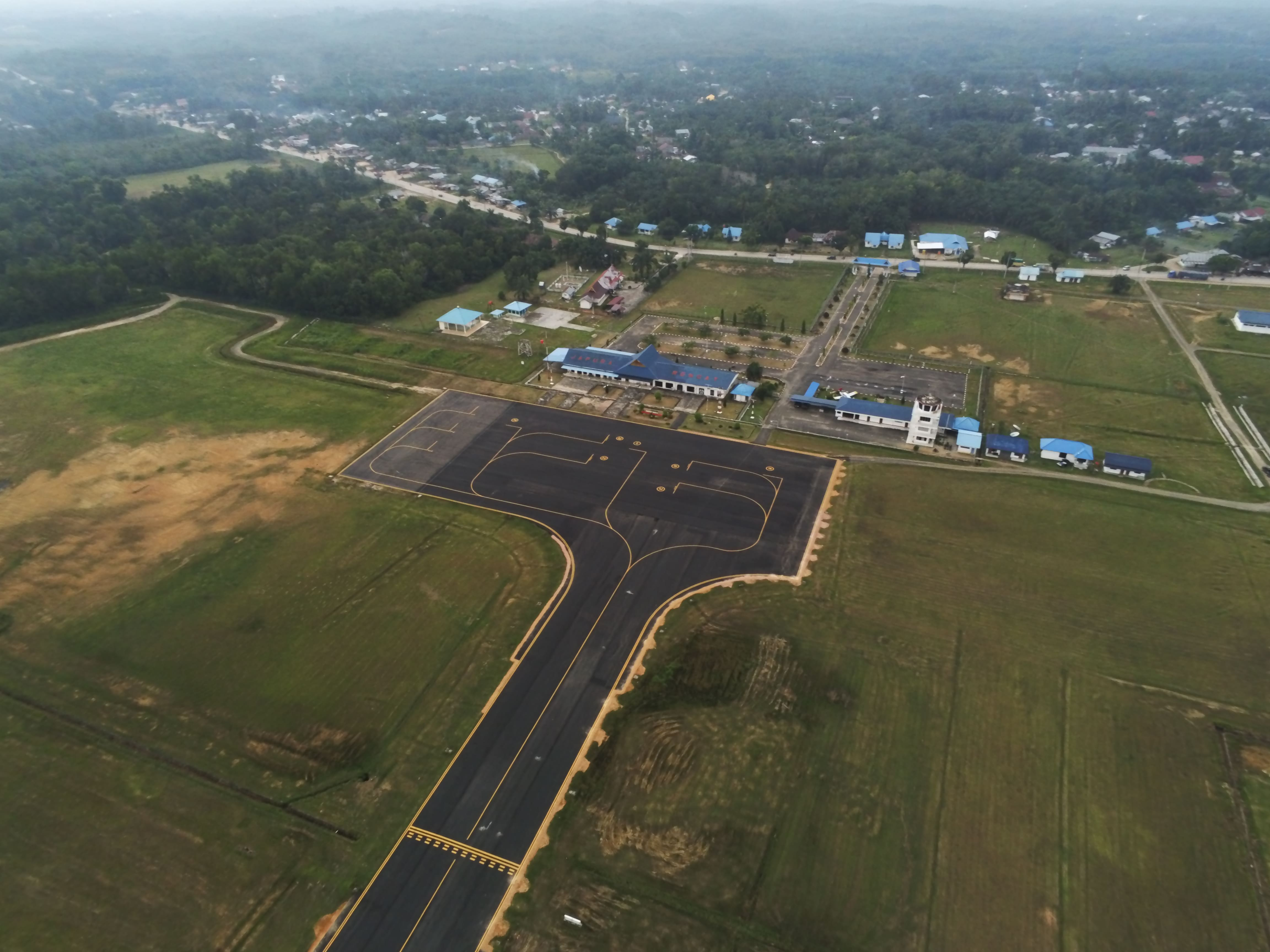
- IATA: RGT; ICAO: WIBJ

Summary
- Airport type: Public
- Owner: Government of Indonesia
- Operator: Directorate General of Civil Aviation
- Serves: Rengat
- Location: Rengat, Indragiri Hulu, Riau, Indonesia
- Opened: 1952
- Time zone: WIB (UTC+07:00)
- Elevation AMSL: 62 ft (19 m)
- Coordinates: 00°21′08″S 102°20′06″E

Maps
- Sumatra region in Indonesia

- Location of the airport in Sumatra RGT (Indonesia)

Runways
Direction	Length		Surface
Direction	m	ft	Surface
15/33	1,400	4,593	Asphalt
- Source: DGCA

Japura Airport (IATA: RGT, ICAO: WIBJ) is a domestic airport located in Rengat, the seat of the Indragiri Hulu Regency in Riau, Indonesia. The airport, which serves Rengat and surrounding areas, can accommodate BAe 146, ATR 72, ATR 42, Fokker 50 and other mid-sized aircraft. The airport currently serves only one route to Batam in the Riau Islands, operated by Susi Air. Previously, Wings Air operated flights to Pekanbaru, but the service has been discontinued as of 2025.

== History ==
This airport was constructed in 1952 by Stanvac, an oil company in Riau. Initially, it was solely used for serving non-commercial flights for Stanvac employees. The site also once hosted an oil well, which is no longer operational. In 1954, ownership of the airport was officially handed over to the Indonesian government. Under the management of the Ministry of Transportation, Japura Airport began offering commercial flights operated by various airlines.

The airlines that once operated flights at Japura Airport generally offered air services on the Jakarta-Rengat-Pekanbaru and Pekanbaru-Rengat-Palembang routes, which existed from 1983 to 2001. In addition, Japura Airport also became a destination for the transmigrants from Java in 1985 and a transit point for Hajj pilgrims on their way to embarkation in Batam. In a week, Japura Airport served at least three flights, both for departures and arrivals.

From 2005 to 2006, Japura Airport also served Riau Airlines with flights on the Rengat-Padang and Padang-Rengat routes.

After that period, Japura Airport no longer served commercial flights. However, from 2017 to 2018, Japura Airport resumed services for ATR-72 aircraft owned by Wings Air and Susi Air. Outside of commercial flights, Japura Airport also served as a flight training center for students of the Indonesian Aviation Academy (STPI) with five Piper PA-28 Cherokee training aircraft and Nusa Flying School.

== Facilities ==
The airport terminal covers an area of 720 m² and includes departure and arrival areas, check-in counters, baggage claim, and restrooms. It has the capacity to accommodate up to 80 people daily.

The runway at Japura Airport measures 1,400 meters by 30 meters, extended from 1,300 meters in 2021. The airport features an apron that is 140 meters by 62.5 meters, with 10 parking stands for small aircraft, as well as a single taxiway measuring 150 meters by 23 meters. At present, the airport is also equipped with complete facilities to support night flights.

== Airlines and destinations ==
Airlines	Destinations
Susi Air	Batam

== Statistics ==
Busiest flights out of Japura Airport by frequency (2025)
Rank	Destinations	Frequency (weekly)	Airline(s)
1	Batam, Riau Islands	2	Susi Air

== Gallery ==
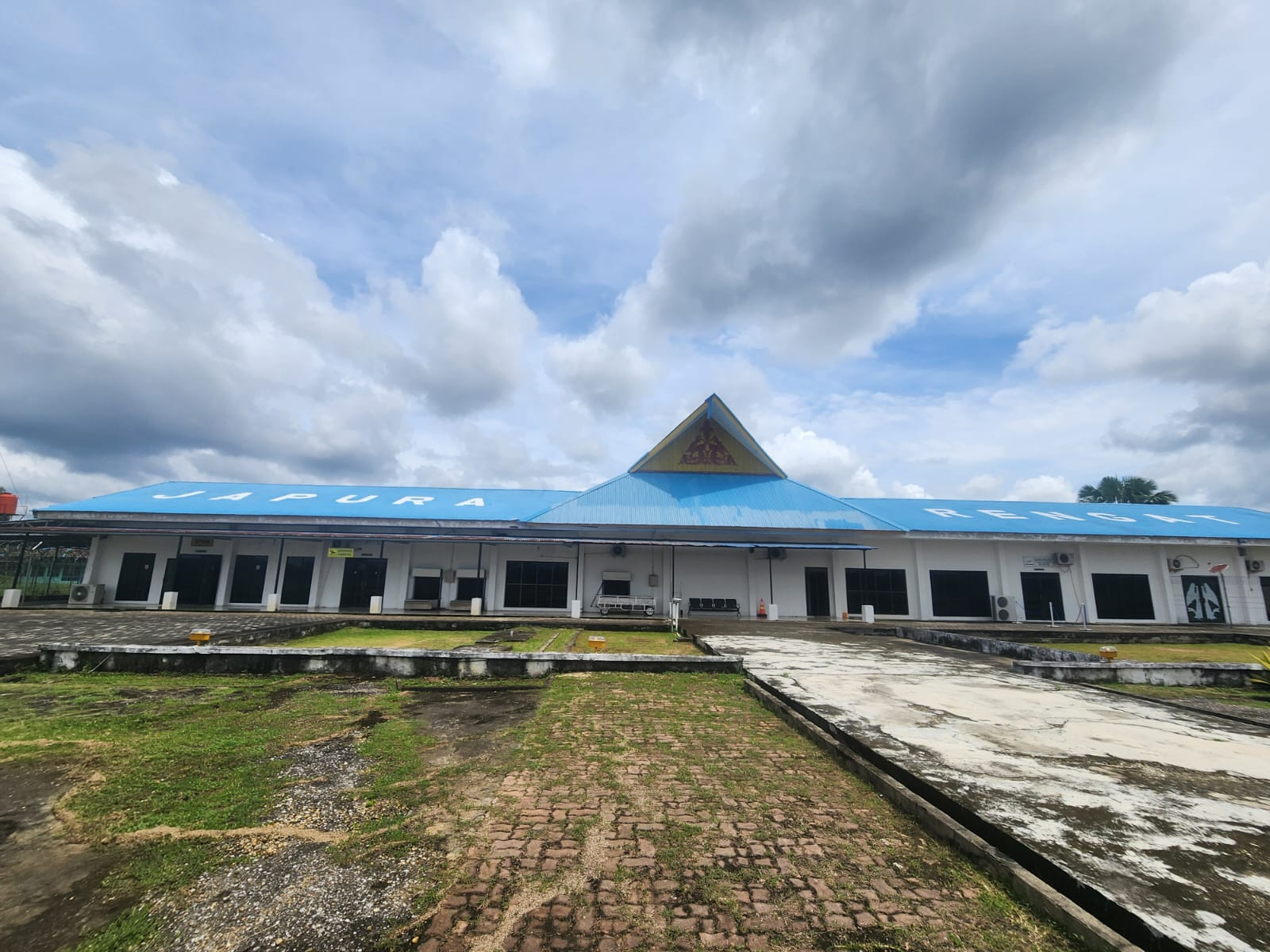
Terminal exterior

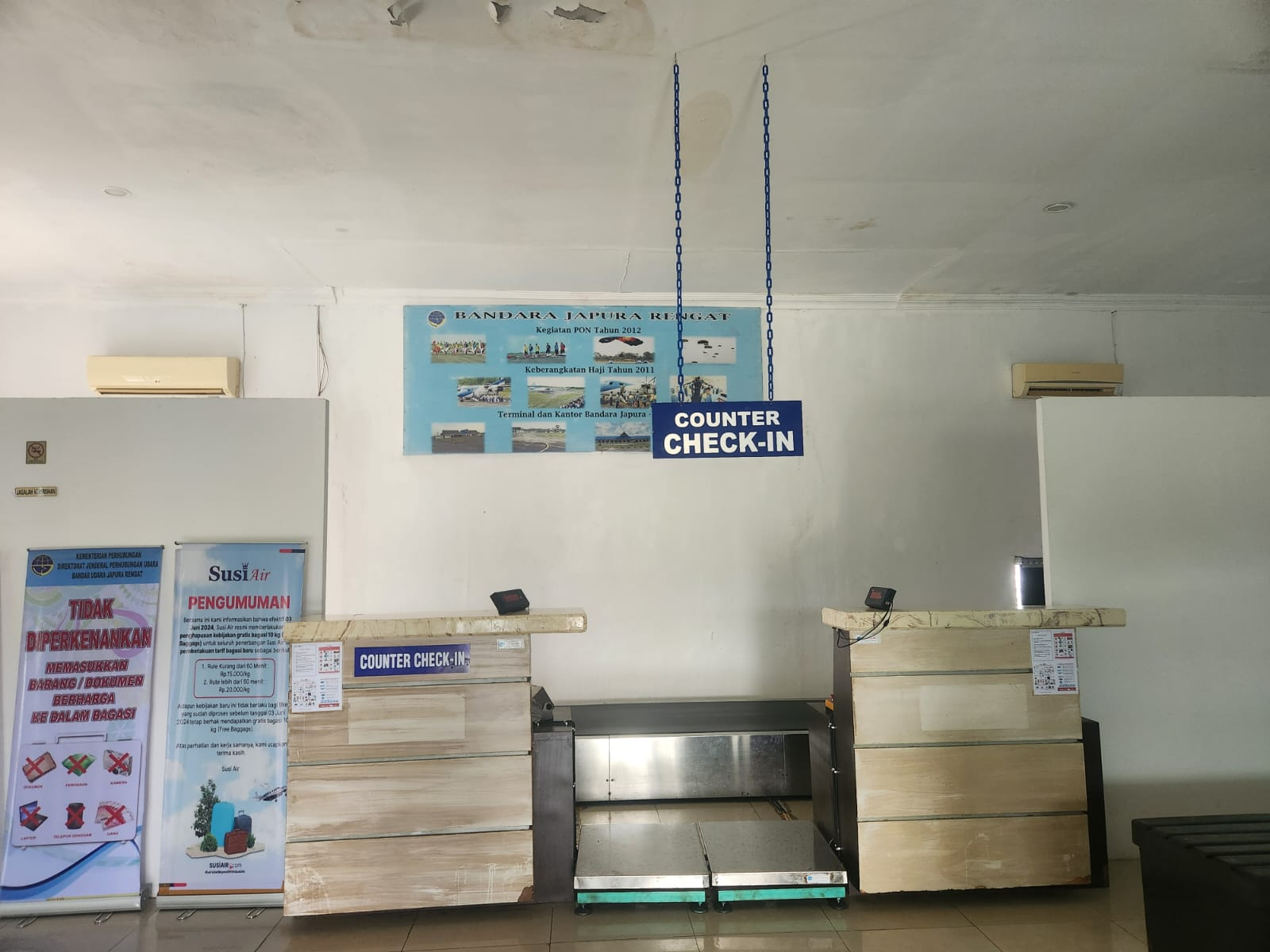
Check-in area

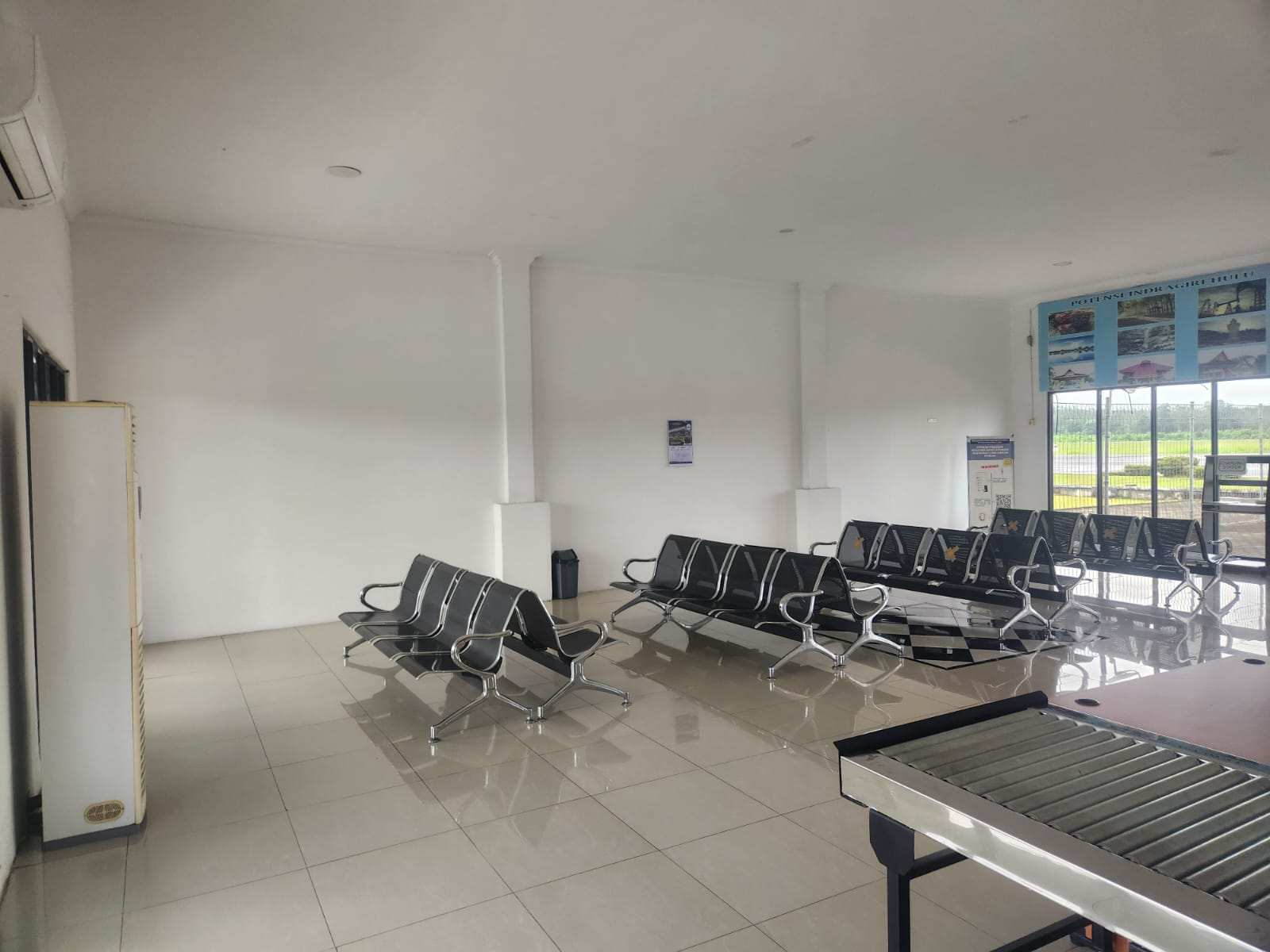
Boarding gate

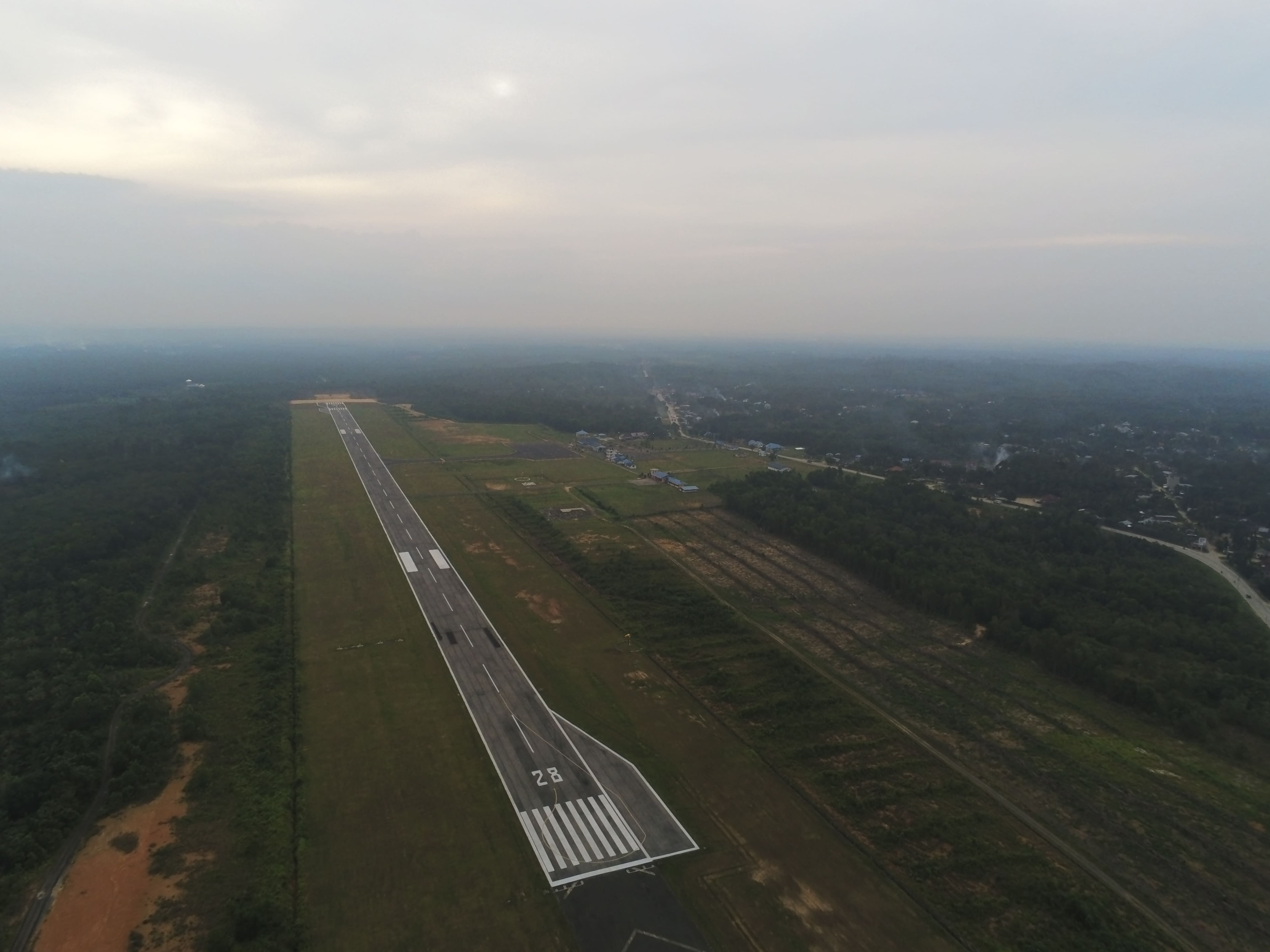
Runway

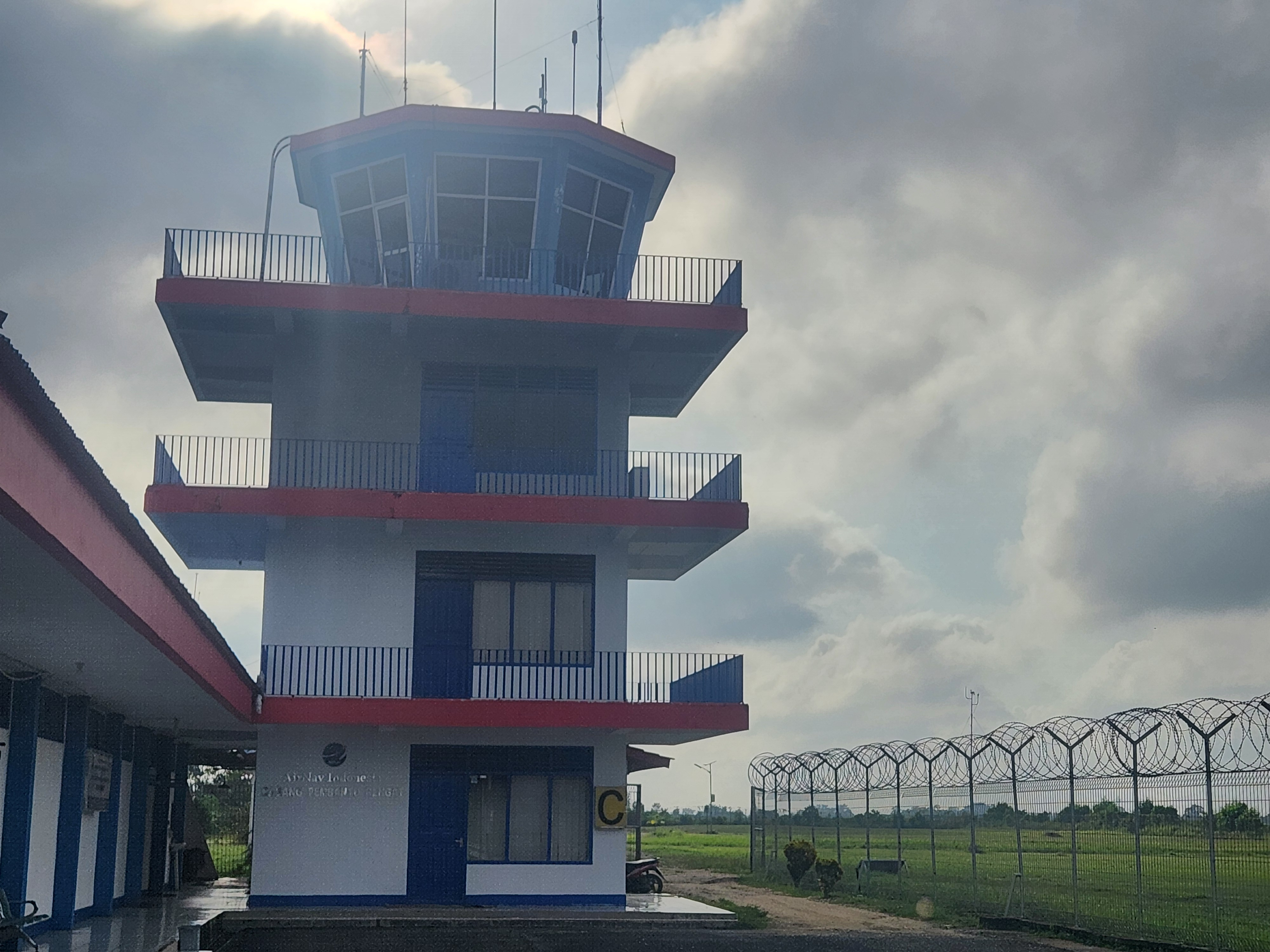
ATC tower
