= Indragiri =

Indragiri may refer to:

- Indragiri or Mahendra Mountains, mountain range described in ancient Indian epics, identified with the Eastern Ghats in India
- Indragiri Hilir Regency, Sumatra, Indonesia
- Indragiri River, Sumatra, Indonesia
- Indragiri Hulu Regency, Sumatra, Indonesia

== See also ==
- Mahendragiri (disambiguation)
