= Mahendran =

Mahendran may refer to:

- Mahendran (filmmaker) (1939–2019), Indian film director, screenwriter and actor
- Mahendran (actor) (born 1991), Indian film actor
- John Mahendran, Indian film director and screenwriter
- Sasi Mahendran, Sri Lankan judge of the Court of Appeal

== See also ==
- Mahindra (disambiguation)
- Mahendra, alternative spelling of the Indian male given name
