= Mohendra =

Mohendra may refer to:

- Mohendra Nath Dutt, Indian poet in English, author of "Kurukshetra" in 1940
- Sri Mohendra Chakraborty, author of the book Sri Sri Ram Thakurer Jeeban Katha, about Ram Thakur
- Mahendra Mohan Choudhry, Chief Minister of Assam, India after Bimala Prasad Chaliha
- Ngangom Mohendra, Member of the Parliament of Manipur, India in 1980 for the Communist Party of India
- Mohendra Ramsarup, Director of Fiscal and Administrative Affairs of the Pratt Center for Community Development, New York City

== See also ==
- Mahindra (disambiguation)
