= Mahindra College =

Mahindra College may refer to:

- Mahindra United World College of India, an international school near Pune, Maharashtra
- The Government Mohindra College, Patiala, India, sometimes referred to as Mahindra College

== See also ==
- Mahindra (disambiguation)
