= Bahadur Singh Bohra =

Indian non-commissioned officer

Havildar Bahadur Singh Bohra AC
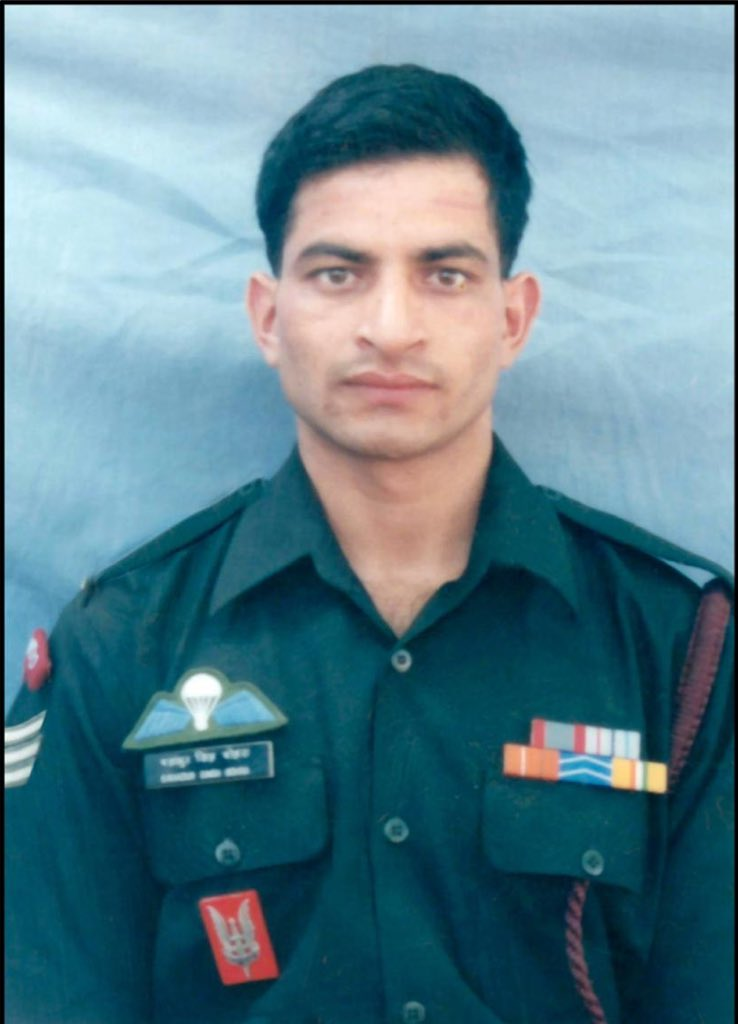
- Portrait of Hav Bohra
- Born: Pithoragarh, Uttarakhand, India
- Died: 25 September 2008; Lawanz, Jammu & Kashmir, India
- Spouse: Shanti Bohra
- Military career
- Allegiance: India
- Branch: Indian Army
- Service years: ?-2008
- Rank: Havildar
- Service number: 13621503
- Unit: 10 Para (Special Forces)
- Awards: Ashoka Chakra

Havildar Bahadur Singh Bohra, AC was a Non Commissioned Officer (NCO) the 10th Battalion, Parachute Regiment of the Indian Army who was a posthumous recipient of Ashok Chakra, India's highest peacetime gallantry award.

== Ashok Chakra Citation ==
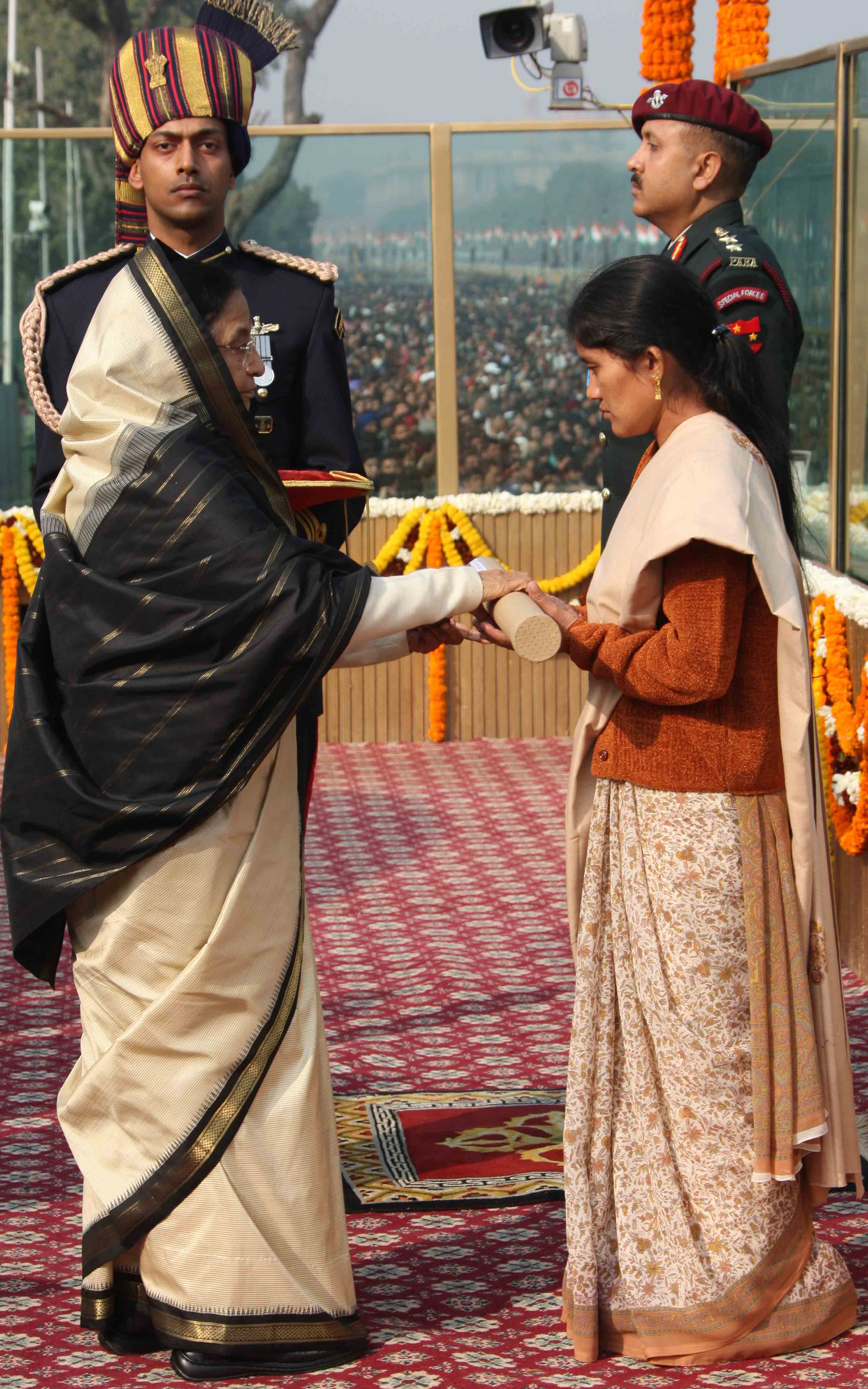
Bohra's widow, Smt Shanti Devi receives the Ashok Chakra from president Pratibha Patil on 26 January 2009.

The Ashok Chakra citation for Bahadur Singh Bohra reads -

Havildar Bahadur Singh Bohra (10th Battalion The Parachute Regiment (Special Forces) - posthumous): Havildar Bahadur Singh Bohra was the squad commander of an assault team deployed for a search operation in general area Lawanz of Jammu and Kashmir.

On 25th September 2008, at 6.15 pm, he observed a group of terrorists and moved quickly to intercept them. In the process, he came under heavy hostile fire. Undaunted, he charged at the terrorists and killed one of them. However, he suffered severe gun shot wounds. Refusing evacuation, he continued with the assault and killed two more terrorists at extremely close range.

Havildar Bahadur Singh Bohra was killed during an operation against terrorists and was recognized for his bravery in the line of duty.

== Personal life ==
He was born in a remote village Rawalkhet, in the Pithoragarh district of Uttarakhand and was the youngest among 4 children, with 2 elder sisters and an elder brother. He is survived by his wife Shanti and 2 daughters, Mansi and Sakshi.
