= Mahinda =

Mahinda may refer to:

== People ==
- Mahinda Rajapaksa, former Sri Lankan President
- Mahinda Amaraweera, Sri Lankan politician
- Mahinda Samarasinghe, Sri Lankan politician
- Mahinda Ratnatilaka, Sri Lankan politician
- Mahinda Wijesekara (1942–2026), Sri Lankan politician
- Mahinda Yapa Abeywardena, Sri Lankan politician
- Mahinda V of Anuradhapura, Sri Lankan king
- Mahindananda Aluthgamage, Sri Lankan politician
- Mahinda (Buddhist monk) (3rd Century BCE), Buddhist monk who introduced the Pali Canon to Sri Lanka
- S. Mahinda (1901-1951), Theravada Buddhist monk born in Sikkim

== Other uses ==
- Mahinda (species), a genus of wasp in Amiseginae subfamilia, Chrysididae familia
- Mahinda College, a Buddhist boys' school in Galle

== See also ==
- Mahindra (disambiguation), the Sanskrit form of the name
