= Inderjit Singh Gill =

Indian general officer

Lieutenant General I S Gill PVSM, MC
- Born: 16 January 1922; United Kingdom
- Died: 30 May 2001 (aged 79); Chennai, Tamil Nadu, India
- Military career
- Allegiance: United Kingdom; British India; India
- Branch: British Army; British Indian Army; Indian Army
- Service years: 1941–1979
- Rank: Lieutenant General
- Service number: 229329 (British Army); IC-1641 (Br. Indian/Indian Army)
- Units: Parachute Regiment; Royal Engineers
- Commands: Western Command; 50 (I) Parachute Brigade; 71 Mountain Brigade; 1 Para; 14 J&K Militia; 10 J&K Militia
- Conflicts: Operation Harling; Bangladesh Liberation War
- Awards: Param Vishisht Seva Medal; Military Cross

Lieutenant General Inderjit Singh Gill, PVSM, MC (16 January 1922 – 30 May 2001) was a general officer in the Indian Army. He was the officiating Director of Military Operations (DMO) of the Indian Army during the Bangladesh Liberation War. He retired in 1979 after serving as the Western Army Commander.

== Early life ==
Gill was born in 1922 in a Jat Sikh family of Lieutenant Colonel Gurdial Singh Gill of the Indian Medical Service and his Scottish wife, Rena Lister. Having done his schooling in India, he was studying engineering at the University of Edinburgh when the second world war broke out, and in 1941 he dropped out to enlist in the Black Watch.

== Military career ==
=== World War II ===
He was commissioned into the Corps of Royal Engineers as a Second Lieutenant on 5 April 1942. He was promoted to Lieutenant on 5 October 1942.

The British Special Operations Executive planned Operation Animals to deceive the Axis Powers into believing that Greece was the target of an Allied amphibious landing, instead of Sicily. Gill served in this operation, for which he was awarded the Military Cross in the London Gazette on 3 February 1944 as a Lieutenant (acting Captain). His citation (which was not made public) read:

"Capt. Gill proceeded in mufti with Maj. Barker on a reconnaissance of the railway on the South edge of the Thessaly Plain between 14 and 18 June. This reconnaissance necessitated a night journey across the Plain on horseback, and, due to enemy patrolling, for the reconnaissance to be carried out in mufti. Four days later he returned with explosives and one Andarti assistant and successfully demolished a bridge to the south of Proerna. During the reconnaissance and during the actual operation he showed the greatest coolness and courage and complete disregard for personal danger. Due to the proximity of German patrols on the railway, he was at all times in grave risk of being discovered. The successful achievement of this operation was entirely due to his personal gallantry.

During the past three months Capt. Gill's work has been of the very highest order. He has consistently worked unsparingly and his work has been an inspiration to the Andartis with him."

(TNA WO 373/46, 20 September 1943. A note at the bottom said: Should this award be approved, it is requested that no details should be made public or communicated to the press)

He was also mentioned in dispatches in the London Gazette of 6 April 1944 for services in the Middle East.

=== Post-Independence ===
Just prior to India's independence, Gill relinquished his British commission and joined the Indian Army. On 7 May 1947, he was commissioned as a lieutenant in the British Indian Army (seniority from 5 July 1944) and with seniority in his former rank of second lieutenant from 5 January 1943. He was promoted to captain in the newly re-designated Indian Army on 5 January 1949.

Gill attended the Defence Services Staff College in 1954. In 1955, he took over command of the 1st battalion The Parachute regiment (1 Para), and was promoted to major on 5 January 1956. After Brigade and Division level commands, he was appointed the Director Military Training (DMT). He was the officiating Director Military Operations (DMO) during the Indo-Pakistani War of 1971.

Gill was awarded the Param Vishisht Seva Medal as a Major General in 1967 and was awarded the Padma Bhushan in 1972 for his role as the officiating Director of Military Operations in the 1971 Indo-Pak War.

After the war, Gill was promoted to lieutenant-general on 1 April 1974. He commanded a Corps in the eastern theater. Upon promotion to Army Commander, he served as the General Officer Commanding-in-Chief Western Command, and retired on 1 June 1979.

== Post-retirement ==
Upon retirement, Gill chose to reside in Chennai, where he was a trustee of various institutions set up by his father. He died on 30 May 2001.

== Dates of rank ==
Insignia	Rank	Component	Date of rank
	Second Lieutenant	British Army	5 April 1942 (emergency)
	Lieutenant	British Army	5 October 1942 (war-substantive)
	Captain	British Army	21 March 1945 (temporary)
	Lieutenant	British Indian Army	7 May 1947 (seniority from 5 July 1944) (Note: With seniority as a second lieutenant from 5 January 1943.)
	Lieutenant	Indian Army	15 August 1947 (Note: Upon independence in 1947, India became a Dominion within the British Commonwealth of Nations. As a result, the rank insignia of the British Army, incorporating the Tudor Crown and four-pointed Bath Star ("pip"), was retained, as George VI remained Commander-in-Chief of the Indian Armed Forces. After 26 January 1950, when India became a republic, the President of India became Commander-in-Chief, and the Ashoka Lion replaced the crown, with a five-pointed star being substituted for the "pip.")
	Captain	Indian Army	5 January 1949
	Captain	Indian Army	26 January 1950 (recommissioning and change in insignia)
	Major	Indian Army	5 January 1956
	Lieutenant-Colonel	Indian Army	5 January 1959
	Colonel	Indian Army	25 November 1965
	Brigadier	Indian Army	27 August 1964 (acting); 1 May 1967 (substantive)
	Major General	Indian Army	2 June 1969 (substantive)
	Lieutenant-General	Indian Army	22 October 1973 (acting); 1 April 1974 (substantive)
