= Mahender Singh Gurjar =

Indian politician

Mahender Singh Gurjar is the Secretary Of Rajasthan Pradesh Congress Committee and Ex Member of the Legislative Assembly from Nasirabad in Ajmer district, Rajasthan, India.
