= Mountain Mahindra =

Indian mountain

Mountain Mahindra or Three Peaks Mountain is one of the highest mountains in the Miyar River valley. The area lies north of the Chenab River in Lahaul district, India. Mahindra is near the Dali Glacier (formerly known as the Thunder Glacier), on the east side of the Miyar valley, in the second side valley when approaching from the north.

Climb magazine, March 2009. Page 69-70
