= Harshan R Nair =

Indian Army officer (1980–2007)

Captain Harshan Radhakrishnan Nair AC
- Born: Harshan Radhakrishnan Nair; 15 April 1980; Thiruvananthapuram, Kerala, India
- Died: 20 March 2007 (aged 26); Jammu and Kashmir
- Military career
- Allegiance: India
- Branch: Indian Army
- Service years: 2002-2007
- Rank: Captain
- Service number: IC-62541
- Unit: 2 Para (Special Forces)
- Awards: Ashoka Chakra

Captain Harshan Radhakrishnan Nair, AC (15 April 1980 – 20 March 2007) was an officer in the Indian Army serving in the elite 2nd Battalion of the Para (Special Forces) also known as "Predators". He was posthumously awarded the Ashoka Chakra, the country's highest peacetime gallantry award in 2008. He was martyred after being shot in the thigh and neck in an encounter with Harkatul Mujahideen terrorists in the Chhoti Margi area of Lolab in Jammu and Kashmir during an operation on 20 March 2007.

== Personal life ==
Harshan Radhakrishnan Nair was born on 15 April 1980 at Manacaud, Thiruvananthapuram, Kerala. He was born to K. Radhakrishnan Nair and G. S. Chitrambika. He did his studies in Sainik School (Kazhakootam) and the National Defence Academy (NDA). He joined B.Tech. Civil Engineering in NSS college of Engineering Palakkad in 1997 and quit the course for joining in NDA. He was a part of the 101st course, Golf squadron at the NDA. He served as Cadet Captain at Sainik School, during his standard XII (1996–97) and is noted for a performance as 'Brutus' during a stage play on 'Julius Caesar' during the Annual day celebrations.

== Military career ==
Harshan was commissioned as a Lieutenant on 16 December 2002 into 2nd Battalion of Special Forces. He was also selected for special weapons training in Israel. He was promoted Captain on 16 December 2004.

=== Encounter ===
The encounter at Kaingur Nar started on 7 March 2007. Captain Harshan, while leading a small team, observed suspicious movement in the MT-3245 area. Harshan eliminated two of the terrorists without sustaining any serious injury to himself.

The encounter continued in the nearby Chotimargi MT-3448 region. On 20 March, Harshan along with one of his junior sergeants cordoned off one of the houses in which terrorists were hiding. At 03:50 AM, four of the terrorists rushed out firing towards Harshan and his companion. Harshan took out the leader of the terrorist group but was shot in the thigh. Despite sustaining the injury, he took out one more terrorist, but in the process got shot in his neck. Before succumbing from his injuries, he lobbed a grenade and wounded the third terrorist.

== Ashoka Chakra ==
Captain Harshan Radhakrishnan Nair was posthumously awarded India's highest peacetime gallantry award Ashoka Chakra for his exceptional courage, fighting spirit and supreme sacrifice.
