= Mahinder Tak =

Mahinder Tak is an Indian-American radiation oncologist and retired US Army colonel. Tak was co-chair of the Democratic National Committee's Indo-American Council during the 2008 Obama campaign She is also one of the largest private collectors of Indian art in the U.S.
