= Mohan Nath Goswami =

Indian Army Ashoka Chakra recipient (died 2015)

Lance Naik Mohan Nath Goswami AC
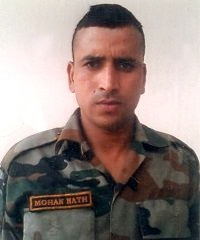
- Born: Lalkuan, Nainital, Uttarakhand, India
- Died: 3 September 2015; Kupwara district, Jammu and Kashmir, India
- Spouse: Bhawna Goswami
- Military career
- Allegiance: India
- Branch: Indian Army
- Service years: 2002 - 2015
- Rank: Lance Naik
- Service number: 13625566W
- Unit: 9 Para (Special Forces)
- Awards: Ashoka Chakra

Lance Naik Mohan Nath Goswami AC was a soldier in the 9 Para (SF) of the Parachute Regiment of the Indian Army. He was posthumously awarded the Ashoka Chakra, India's highest peacetime military decoration. On 3 September 2015, while serving with the 9th battalion of the Parachute Regiment, Goswami was martyred in an ambush operation while fighting four terrorists in Kupwara district, Jammu and Kashmir. For his actions in Kupwara, he was posthumously awarded the Ashoka Chakra.

== Early life ==
Goswami a Kumaoni was born in Indira Nagar-I village in Lalkuan, Nainital, Uttarakhand, India. He had one daughter, Bhumika Goswami, with his wife Bhawna. His father had also served in the Army.

== Military career ==
Goswami volunteered to join the elite Parachute Regiment of the Indian Army in 2002. He was actively involved in three operations in which ten terrorists were killed and one captured alive in his last 11 days. The first operation was conducted in Khurmur, Handwara, on 23 August 2015 and resulted in the elimination of three Lashkar-e-Taiba terrorists. He then volunteered for second operation in Rafiabad. The operation, which lasted over two days, led to the elimination of three Lashkar-e-Taiba terrorists and the capture of one terrorist, Sajjad Ahmad alias Abu Ubed Ullah. Goswami's last operation was on 3 September 2015, where he was part of an ambush team. He was injured during the gunfight and succumbed to his wounds, but not before killing two and wounding another two terrorists.

Goswami's body was flown by an Indian Air Force aircraft to Bareilly, from where it was taken by an army helicopter to Pantnagar and on to his birthplace. He was cremated with full military honours in his native village.

== Ashok Chakra ==
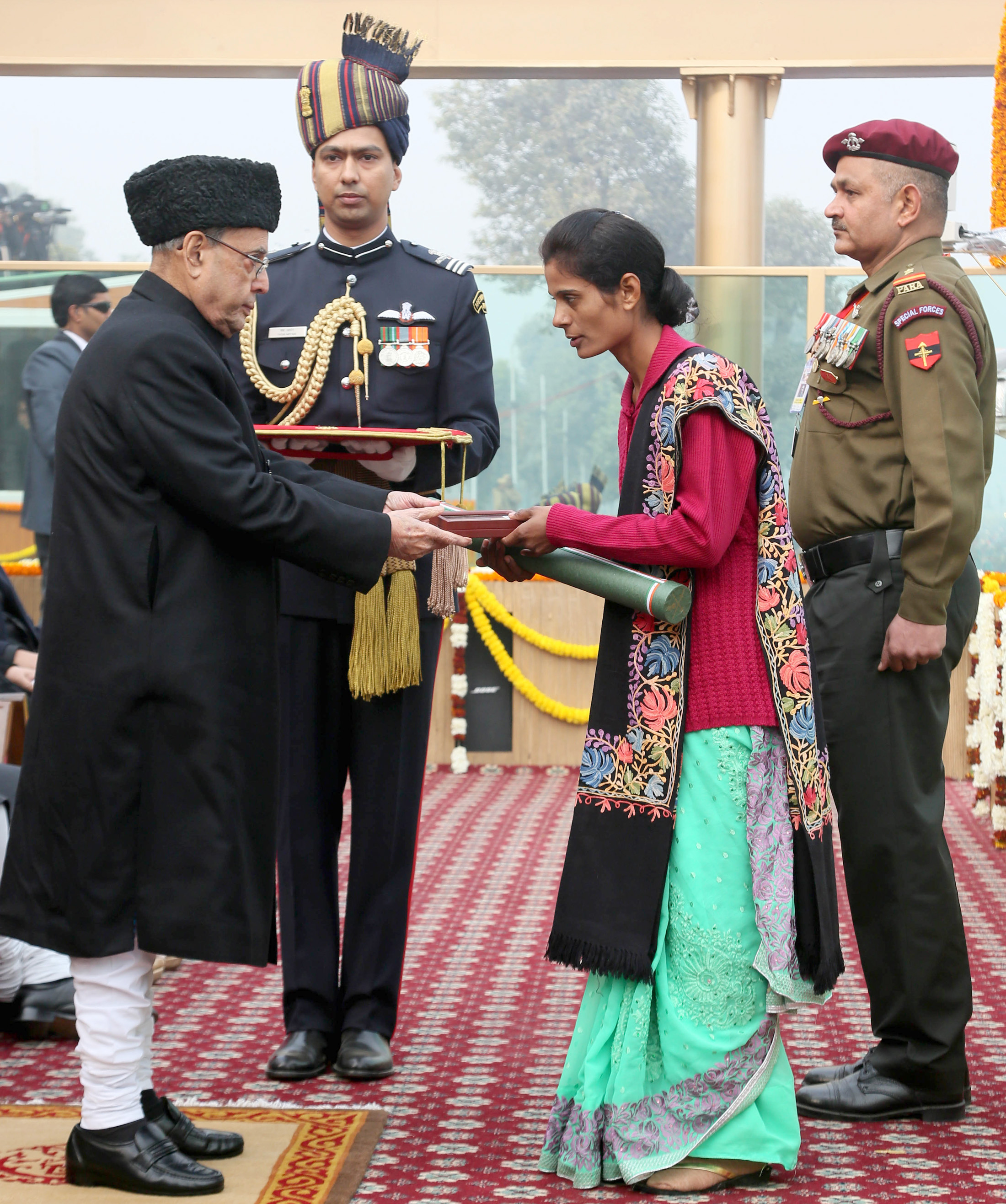
Mohan Nath Goswami's widow receives the Ashok Chakra from president Pranab Mukherjee on 26 January 2016.

The Ashoka Chakra citation for Mohan Goswami reads:

On the intervening night of 02/03 September 2015 Lance Naik Mohan Nath Goswami was part of an ambush in Haphruda forest at Kupwara district of Jammu and Kashmir. At about 20:15hrs, there was a fierce encounter with four terrorists wherein two of his comrades were injured and pinned down. Lance Naik Mohan along with his buddy dashed forward to rescue their injured colleagues, knowing well the risks to their own lives. He first assisted in eliminating one terrorist. Sensing grave danger to three of his wounded colleagues, Lance Naik Mohan with utter disregard to his own personal safety, charged at the remaining terrorists drawing intense fire from them. He was hit in the thigh. Unmindful, he closed in and eliminated one terrorist, injured another and was again shot in the abdomen. Undeterred by his injuries, he hurled himself on the last terrorist and killed him at point blank range before succumbing to his wounds. Lance Naik Mohan not only killed two terrorists, but also assisted in neutralizing the other two and save the lives of three of his wounded colleagues. Thus, Lance Naik Mohan Nath Goswami exhibited most conspicuous gallantry in personally eliminating two terrorists and assisting in evacuation of his wounded colleagues and made supreme sacrifice in the highest traditions of the Indian Army.

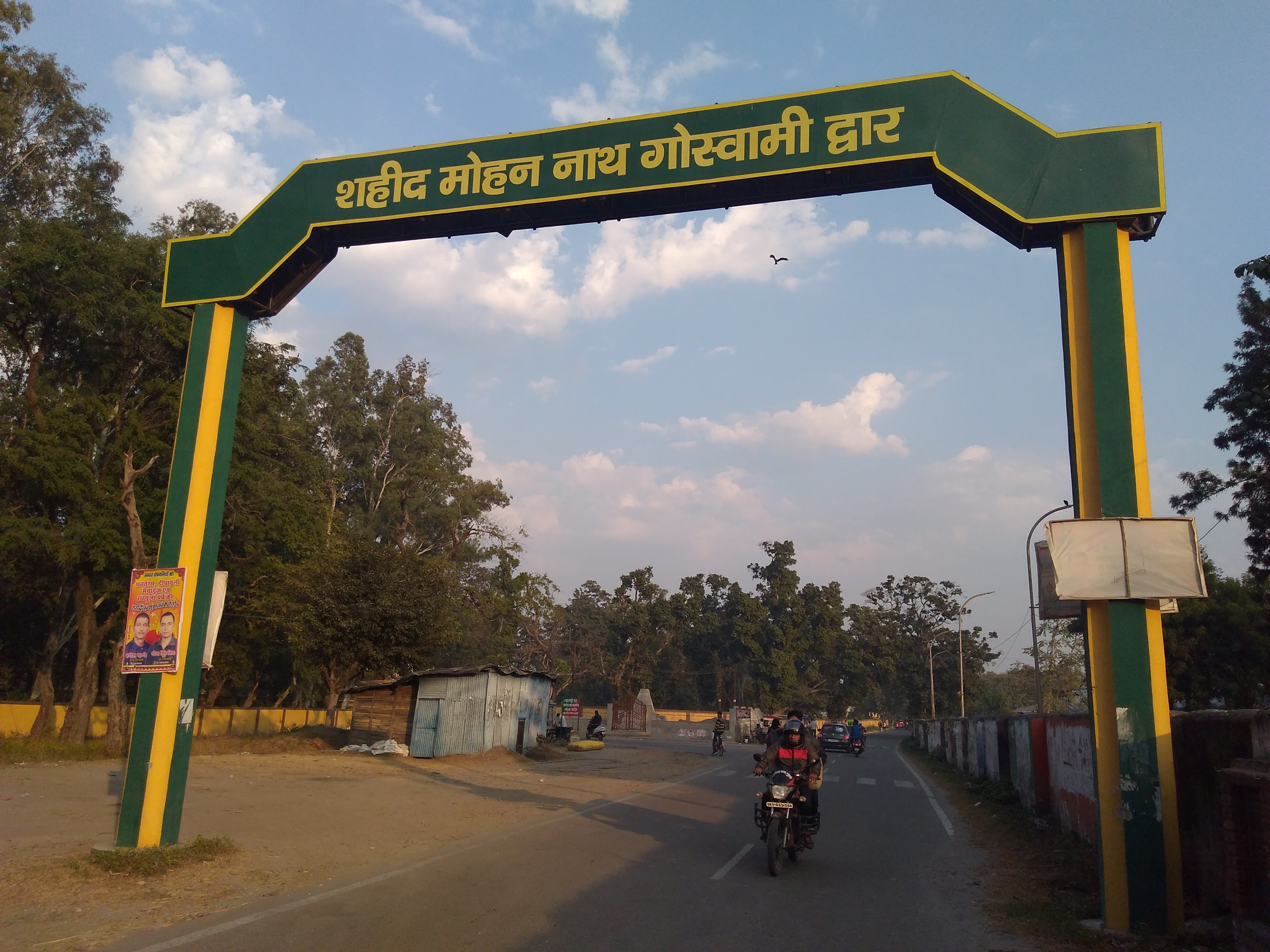
Mohan Nath Goswami gate at Lalkuan.
