= Parachute Regiment (India) =

Airborne regiment of the Indian Army

- Active: 1944 – present
- Country: India
- Allegiance: Indian Army
- Type: Airborne forces Special forces
- Role: Counter-insurgency; Counter-Terrorism; Direct action; Rapid deployment force; Special operations; Special Reconnaissance
- Size: 15 battalions
- Regimental Centre: Bengaluru, Karnataka
- Nicknames: The Paras; Red Devils
- Motto: Shatrujeet (Conqueror of Enemies)
- War Cry: Balidan Param Dharma (Sacrifice is Supreme Duty)
- March: "Tum bharat ke veer ho, tum apne desh ke rakshak ho. jaati bhed bhav ko mitaye ja, Tu apni himmat badhaye ja, Kadam badhaye ja, peeche hatna kaam nahi, aage badhe ja."
- Rifle: IWI Tavor TAR-21
- Battle honours: Shelatang, Naushera, Poonch, Jhanger, Hajipir, Poongli Bridge, Mandhol, and Chachro

Commanders
- Current commander: Lieutenant General Pushpendra Singh
- Notable commanders: Mohammad Usman; I.S. Gill; R.S. Dayal; Sagat Singh

Insignia
- Parachute Wings

The Parachute Regiment is the main airborne and special forces regiment of the Indian Army. It was raised in 1945 as part of the British Indian Army but was disbanded after World War II and was re-raised in 1952 as part of the Indian Army. Presently, it consists of fifteen regular Special Forces battalions, one Rashtriya Rifles battalion, and two Territorial Army battalions.

== History ==
=== World War II ===
The first Indian airborne formation was the British Indian Army's 50th Parachute Brigade, which was raised during World War II on 29 October 1941, initially consisting of 151 Parachute Battalion (composed of British troops), 152nd Parachute Battalion (consisting of Indian troops) and 153rd Parachute Battalion (consisting of Gurkha troops) alongside other support units.

Colonel A.G. Rangaraj, MVC, of the Indian Medical Service and RMO of 152nd Parachute Battalion, became the first Indian, along with Hav. Maj. Mathura Singh to make a parachute descent. In 1942–43, the formation saw limited action at Nara against Pathan tribals in the North-West Frontier Province and conducted some intelligence-gathering missions in Burma, utilizing their somewhat limited airborne capabilities. In August 1943, the 154th Parachute Battalion was formed from troops from the 3rd battalion, 7th Gurkha Rifles and assigned to the 50th Parachute Brigade. In March 1944, the 151st Parachute Battalion was transferred to Britain, renamed as 156th Parachute Battalion, and assigned to the 4th Parachute Brigade of the 1st Airborne Division.

The 50th Parachute Brigade, without the 154th Parachute Battalion, then saw extensive action at Sangshak and later in the Imphal plains on the Burmese border against two reinforced Japanese divisions. 154th Parachute Battalion had not completed its air training, so it stayed back to attain airborne status. During the Battle of Sangshak (21–26 March 1944), which lasted six days, the brigade suffered extremely heavy casualties, totalling 40 officers and VCOs and other 545 ranks, winning the appreciation of Lt. Gen. William Slim, the commander of the British Fourteenth Army. The breakout on the night of 26 March 1944 saw the remnants of the once-proud parachute brigade fight their way south and then west through the Japanese-infested jungles to Imphal. It achieved its task of preventing the flanking Japanese forces from surrounding Imphal and destroying IV Corps. Despite the losses it suffered in Sangshak, the paratroopers formed ad hoc units and continued to participate in actions to destroy Japanese forces near and around Imphal until their withdrawal at the end of July.

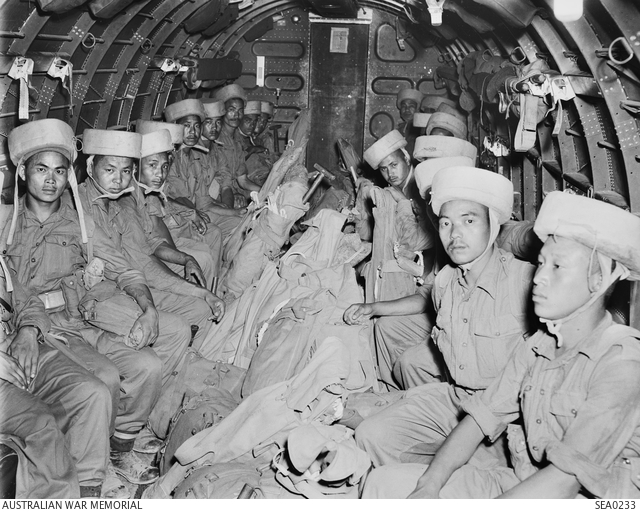
Indian paratroopers of the 44th Indian Airborne Division awaiting the signal to line up and prepare to jump from a Douglas C47 Dakota transport aircraft in the airborne landing south of Rangoon, 5th January 1945.

Later in 1944, the brigade was expanded to form the 44th Indian Airborne Division as the original 9th Airborne Division was to be named because the 44th Armoured Division (whose services were no longer required in the Middle East theatre of war) was to be converted to an airborne unit. The two ad hoc brigades from the Chindit operations, the 14th and the 77th, were included to form the division. The original plan was to have a battalion each of British troops, Indian troops, and Gurkha troops in both the parachute brigades, with the 14th being converted for the airlanding role, though little is known about glider-borne training or operations in India. The 14th was later converted for the airborne role. The Governor General's Bodyguard (GGBG) joined the airborne fraternity and was named the 44th Airborne Division Reconnaissance Squadron. 9th Field Regiment (RIA) and other support units, too, were inducted. 60th Parachute Field Ambulance, which till then had been in Burma and performed well, was selected to augment the medical element for the formation.

In 1945, the 44th Indian Airborne Division was finally designated as the 2nd Indian Airborne Division. The plan was to raise an entire airborne corps with the British 6th Airborne Division of D-Day/Normandy fame to be brought to India as the second divisional formation, but the war ended before it could materialize. The Indian Army's Parachute Regiment was officially formed on 1 March 1945, consisting of four battalions and an equal number of independent companies. The regiment's first airborne action was towards the end of the war, when a reinforced Gurkha Parachute Battalion was parachuted into Burma at Elephant Point on 1 May 1945, as part of Operation Dracula. The battalion performed well, earning the respect of all, including the critics of airborne warfare. Despite the performance in Operation Dracula, the Parachute Regiment was disbanded in late 1945 as part of the reduction and restructuring of the post-war British Indian Army. However, they retained their airborne role and formed part of the airborne division.

=== Indian independence ===
After independence and partition, the airborne division was divided between the armies of India and newly formed Pakistan, with India retaining the Divisional HQ and the 50th and 77th Parachute Brigades, while the 14th Parachute Brigade went to Pakistan. The 77th Parachute Brigade was later disbanded. Thus, the Indian Army retained only one airborne formation, the 50th Parachute Brigade. This brigade consisted of three distinguished battalions from different regiments: the 1st battalion, Punjab Regiment (Para), the 3rd battalion, Maratha Light Infantry (Para), and the 1st battalion, Kumaon Regiment (Para). These battalions had been carrying out parachute duties after the disbandment of the regiment in 1945 and had continued to wear the uniform of their parent regiments except for a change in headgear to the maroon beret, and to distinguish them from the other battalions of their regiments, the word 'Para' was added after their names.

=== Indo-Pakistani War of 1947 ===
Both the 50th and 77th Parachute Brigades saw extensive action in the Indo-Pakistani War of 1947. The three parachute battalions and the support units of the 50th Parachute Brigade saw extensive action. The three battalions distinguished themselves in the battles of Shelatang, Naushera, Jhangar, and Poonch, after which they were awarded the respective battle honours. The brigade commander, Mohammad Usman, was killed in action on 3 July 1948. He was awarded the Maha Vir Chakra posthumously.

60th Parachute Field Ambulance, as part of the 77th Parachute Brigade, also saw action in Kashmir, where it raised and maintained the now famous Cariappa Hospital, catering to the needs of numerous units in its vicinity (27th Indian Army and state Forces battalions along with other units) and constantly faced shortages due to the war situation and inclement weather conditions. The unit's performance, like other units of the parachute brigade, was beyond all expectations and resulted in the awarding of numerous gallantry awards, including a Vir Chakra to Captain V. Rangaswami, the surgeon.

=== 60th Parachute Field Ambulance in the Korean War ===
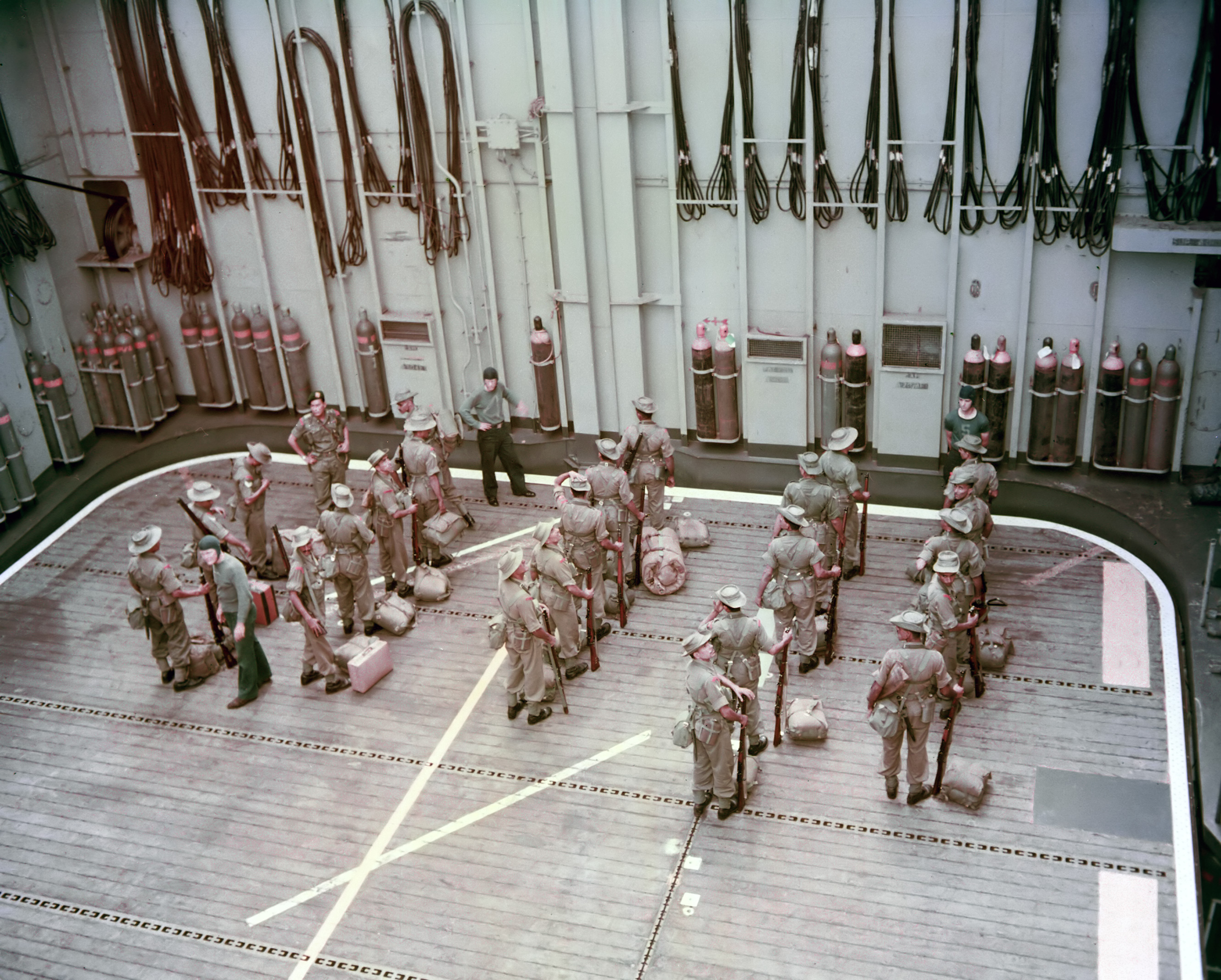
Indian troops on the USS Point Cruz get ready to be flown by helicopter to the neutral buffer zone in Korea, 7th September 1953.

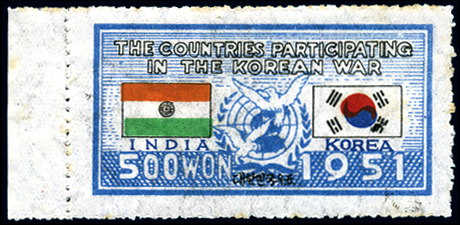
South Korean 500 won stamp issued in 1951 commemorating the role of the Indian 60th PFA during the Korean War 1950–1953.

With the North Korean invasion of South Korea in 1950, the UN sent out a call to the free world for assistance. India decided not to get involved militarily but contributed a medical unit, the 60th Parachute Field Ambulance (60th PFA), which served in Korea for a total of four years. Commander was Lieutenant Colonel A. G. Rangaraj and 60th PFA was involved in providing medical cover to the forces of the UN Command as well as the ROK Army and local civilians, and earned the title, "The Angels in Brown Berets" due to their iconic reddish-brown berets. The unit also looked after the North Korean POWs. They treated about 20,000 wounded soldiers and civilians from November 1950 to February 1954.

The highlight of the tenure undoubtedly was when the unit provided their services during Operation Tomahawk on 21 March 1951 to the U.S Army's 187 Airborne Regimental Combat Team for which the unit was awarded two Maha Vir Chakras, one bar to Vir Chakra and six Vir Chakras, and a host of other Indian and international individual and unit decorations. These included the unit citations from the US and South Korean Army chiefs, commendations from the 1st Commonwealth Division, and British commanders. There was a special mention of the unit in the House of Lords in the British Parliament. The 12 members of the unit who participated in the airborne operation were also awarded the American Parachutist Badge. On their return to India, the unit was awarded the President's Trophy by the first President of the Republic of India, Dr. Rajendra Prasad, on 10 March 1955 at Agra, the first one of its kind and the only one to date. The troops of the unit were also awarded 25 Mentioned-in-Despatches.

=== Re-raising ===
On 15 April 1952, the Parachute Regiment was re-raised by absorbing the three existing parachute battalions of the 50th Parachute Brigade. The 1st battalion, Punjab Regiment (Para) was redesignated as the 1st battalion, Parachute Regiment (Punjab). The 3rd battalion, Maratha Light Infantry (Para) was redesignated as the 2nd battalion, Parachute Regiment (Maratha). The 1st battalion, Kumaon Regiment (Para) was redesignated as the 3rd battalion, Parachute Regiment (Kumaon). The Parachute Regiment Depot and Records was raised at Agra on 15 April 1952, to coincide with the raising of the regiment. All personnel documents for troops who were serving in the three parachute battalions that were converted into the Parachute Regiment were transferred to Depot and Records from the Punjab Regiment, Maratha Light Infantry, and the Kumaon Regiment. Simultaneously, a Personal Accounts Office (PAO) for the regiment was raised at Mathura as part of PAO (OR) Artillery. Until 1952, the 50th Parachute Brigade had used the Pegasus with "India" written under it, as a formation sign. When the Parachute Regiment was raised, a new formation sign, a light blue Shatrujeet, a half-horse, half-man with wings and a bow and arrow in a ready position, signifying the operational readiness of the brigade, on a maroon background, replaced the Pegasus. Lt. General M.L. Tuli, of 3rd Para (Kumaon), designed the new cap badge and the formation sign.

In 1961, the raising of the 4th battalion augmented the strength of the regiment. After the Sino-Indian War of 1962, the regiment, as with the rest of the armed forces, saw expansion on an unprecedented scale, with the 5th battalion raised in 1962, the 6th battalion raised in 1963, and the 7th battalion raised in 1964, followed by the raising of the 8th battalion. A second parachute brigade, the 51st, was also raised to complement the 50th Brigade but was reverted to its normal infantry role in 1976. Of the original units of the 50th Parachute Brigade, only two exist as of date, namely 411th Parachute Field Company of the Bombay Sappers, the oldest parachute unit of the Indian Army, and the 50th Parachute Brigade Signal Company. The original medical unit, 80th Parachute Field Ambulance, became part of 14th Parachute Brigade and went over to Pakistan. At the same time, 43rd Para Fd Amb was disbanded, as with the other minor units of the 77th Para Brigade. Only one field ambulance, 60th Parachute Field Ambulance (now 60th Parachute Field Hospital), was retained in the airborne role. The other minor units followed suit. The Governor General's Bodyguard was retained in the pathfinder role.

=== Para (Special Forces) ===
During the Indo-Pakistani War of 1965, an irregular force with volunteers from various infantry regiments under Maj. Megh Singh Rathore of the Brigade of the Guards carried out unconventional operations and achieved results disproportionate to its strength, and the need for unconventional forces was felt. The force had been disbanded, and the volunteers reverted to their parent units. Major Megh Singh Rathore was tasked to raise a battalion for the purpose, resulting in the raising of the 9th battalion, Parachute Regiment (Commando) on 1 July 1966. The unit was originally raised as part of the Brigade of the Guards, but due to the parachute qualification being an essential part of commando operations, the battalion was transferred to the Parachute Regiment and became the 9th Battalion, Parachute Regiment (Commando). One year later, on 1 July 1967, the battalion was split into two, and both battalions were brought up to strength as the 9th Battalion, Parachute Regiment (Commando) and the 10th Battalion, Parachute Regiment (Commando). In 1979, the 1st battalion, Parachute Regiment, was put through trial conversion into a Special Forces battalion modeled on the lines of the British SAS, and after a three-year conversion period, re-designated as a Special Forces battalion, named as 1st battalion, Parachute Regiment (Commando). The two Parachute Commando battalions (9 and 10) were also subsequently re-designated as Special Forces battalions. At some point, the name "Commando" was replaced by "Para (Special Forces)". On 1 February 1996, the 21st, the conversion had been underway since 1994. In 1999, the 2nd battalion, Parachute Regiment was also converted into a Special Forces battalion, followed in 2002 by the 3rd battalion and in 2003 by the 4th battalion. Subsequently, in the year 2010, the 11th battalion, Parachute Regiment (Special Forces), and in the year 2013, the 12th battalion, Parachute Regiment (Special Forces), were raised at Agra to augment the strength of the existing Special Forces battalions. In the year 2022, in a significant boost to operational capability, airborne battalions 5th, 6th, 7th, 23rd & 29th battalions were converted to a specialist role, having honed their skills over two gruelling months that culminated in a validation over seven days. Another battalion 13th battalion, Parachute Regiment (Special Forces), was raised in Bangalore in 2022.

=== Indo-Pakistani War of 1965 ===
During the Indo-Pakistan War of 1965, 1 Para of the Parachute Regiment, placed under operational command of 68 Infantry Brigade, played an important role in the capture of the Hajipir Pass, located on the western fringe of Pir Panjal ranges on the Pakistani side and dominating the Rajouri -Poonch-Uri highway in India. The battalion under the command of Major Ranjit Singh Dayal (Later awarded MVC for the operation) was responsible for the capture of Sank, Ser, and Ledwali Gali on 26 and 27 August and the Hajipir Pass on 28 August 1965. Thereafter, repeated attempts by the enemy to recapture the Pass were thwarted by paratroopers of the battalion. In recognition of its resilient gallantry and indomitable spirit, 1 Para earned the Battle Honour ‘Hajipir’ and Theatre Honour ‘Jammu & Kashmir’ in 1965. At the same time, in the Lahore sector, the 50th Parachute Brigade was tasked with capturing the Jallo railway bridge. Despite being a newly raised battalion, 6 Para of the Parachute Regiment, with superb battle drill and fighting spirit, attacked the Jallo railway bridge, enduring stiff resistance and heavy artillery fire. The unit successfully captured and occupied the bridge on 17 September, raising the success signal ‘Ghora’.The officers and men in the brigade were overjoyed with this operationally critical capture.

=== Indo-Pakistani War of 1971 ===
During the Indo-Pakistani War of 1971, the regiment saw numerous actions in both the eastern and western theatres. For the first time in independent India's history, an airborne infantry battalion (2nd battalion, Parachute Regiment) was dropped at Tangail, which contributed substantially to speeding up the liberation of Bangladesh. Elements of the 2nd battalion became the first Indian troops to enter Dhaka. The regiment's Commando battalion proved their professional skills by conducting spectacular lightning raids into Chachro, Sindh, Pakistan, and Mandhol, Jammu and Kashmir. The regiment earned the battle honours Poongli Bridge, Chachro, Mandhol, and Defence of Poonch during these operations. While the 51st Parachute Brigade saw action in Sri Ganganagar, Rajasthan, the 50th Parachute Brigade saw action initially in Bangladesh with 2 Para in the airborne role, 7 Para as the advance guard, and the rest of the brigade in a ground role. The 50th Parachute Brigade then moved to assist its sister brigade in the western sector, thus becoming the only formation to see action on both fronts.

=== Operation Pawan ===
Five Parachute Regiment battalions (including the three Commando battalions) took part in Operation Pawan, as part of the Indian Peace Keeping Force in Sri Lanka.

=== Operation Cactus ===
With the 6 Para Battalion group comprising a company ex 3rd Para, Battery ex 17th Para Field Regiment, one Field Platoon of 411th Para Sappers, Airborne ADS of 60th Para Field Ambulance, and the Para Brigade Signalers as its spearhead in the first wave and 7 Para Battalion in the second wave, the 50th Parachute Brigade under Brigadier Farukh Bulsara took part in Operation Cactus on 3 November 1988, the first successful overseas intervention operation since Korea to rescue the president and aid the duly elected government of the Maldives.

=== Counter insurgency operations ===
Parachute Regiment battalions have been employed in counter-insurgency roles, both in the northeast and Jammu and Kashmir, earning fifteen COAS Unit Citations.

The Ashok Chakra, India's highest gallantry award in peacetime, was awarded posthumously to:-

- Capt. Arun Singh Jasrotia,SM (9 PARA CDO, 1996)
- Maj. Sudhir Kumar Walia, SM** (9 PARA CDO, 2000)
- Ptr. Sanjog Chhetri (9 PARA SF, 2003)
- Capt. Harshan R (2 PARA SF, 2007)
- Hav. Bahadur Singh Bohra (10 PARA SF, 2008)
- Hav. Gajender Singh Bisht (10 PARA SF/ SAG, 2009)
- Maj. Mohit Sharma,SM (1 PARA SF, 2010)
- L.Nk. Mohan Nath Goswami (9 PARA SF, 2016)

9 PARA SF was conferred the "Bravest of the Brave" honour by the COAS, Indian Army in 2001.

=== Kargil War ===
In 1999, seven out of the ten parachute regiment battalions were deployed in Kargil district, Jammu and Kashmir, as part of Operation Vijay, which bears testimony to the operational profile of the regiment. 6 Para and 7 Para, along with 1 Para (SF), cleared the Mushkoh Valley intrusions, while 5 Para was actively involved in the Batalik sector, where it exhibited great courage and tenacity, and was awarded the COAS unit citation. 10 Para (SF) was involved in operations at Khalubar Ridge. 9 Para (SF) saw combat at the heights of Zulu Ridge by passing through land mines and clearing them. It was one of the toughest operations in the Kargil war.

=== United Nations operations ===
Calls of international peacekeeping have taken airborne units (INDBATT) to Korea (1950–54), the Gaza Strip (1956–58), Sierra Leone (2000, as part of UNAMSIL), Congo (2004, 2014 as part of MONUSCO), Sudan (2009 as part of UNMIS), South Sudan (2011 as part of UNMISS), Ethiopia/Eritrea (2004 as part of UNMEE) and Lebanon (2005 as part of UNIFIL). The operations in Sierra Leone involved a daring rescue mission conducted by the 2 Para (SF) and 9 Para (SF). Parachute Regiment battalions have also been awarded the UN Force Commander's battalion citation on a number of occasions and have officers/PBOR serving in staff roles or as observers with various United Nations missions.

=== Recent times ===
Recently, two more infantry battalions underwent probation and were re-raised as Parachute Regiment battalions by transfer from other regiments. In 2014, the 23rd battalion, Rajputana Rifles, was transferred to the Parachute Regiment and redesignated as the 23rd battalion of the Parachute Regiment. Simultaneously, the 29th battalion, Rajput Regiment was transferred to the Parachute Regiment and redesignated as the 29th battalion of the Parachute Regiment.

== Mountaineering and South Pole Expedition ==
The Parachute Regiment has historically been active in the field of mountaineering. Late Colonel Avtar Singh Cheema of 7th Para (SF) was the first Indian to reach the top of Mount Everest in 1965. Captain Abhijeet Singh from 7th Para (SF) also summited the peak in 2003, while Brigadier Saurabh Singh Shekhawat of 21 Para (SF) scaled the peak thrice in 2001, 2003, and 2005, and has also scaled peaks in the French Alps and in Africa. Lt. Col. Bhupesh Hada of 10 Para (SF) led the Indian Army Snow Lion Everest Expedition team to the Everest summit in 2012. Col Sarfraz Singh, of 6th PARA, led a seven-member team of Nimas to the world's highest peak on 20 May 2018.

In 1981, a Parachute Regiment team scaled Nanda Devi when they attempted both main and east peaks simultaneously. The southwest face of Nanda Devi East was climbed for the first time, but both climbers, Premjit Lal and Phu Dorjee, were killed in the descent. Three others – Daya Chand, Ram Singh, and Lakha Singh – also fell to their deaths, leading to the highest ever number of casualties on the mountain. Maj. Jai Bahuguna, a famous climber of the Corps of Engineers who died on Everest, also served with the 50th Parachute Major General Mohammed Amin Naik and Colonel Anand Swaroop, also of the Corps of Engineers, who summited Nanda Devi in 1993. Maj. N. Linyu of the 60th Parachute Field Hospital is the first female airborne officer who has participated in numerous expeditions in the Himalayas. She summited Everest in May 2012 and is also an accomplished skydiver. Colonel J.K. Bajaj, an EME officer serving with the 50th Parachute Brigade, who commanded 2nd (Independent) Parachute Field Workshop, became the first Asian to ski to the South Pole with the Overland International Expedition to plant the Indian flag at the South Pole on 17 January 1989. Colonel Balwant Sandhu, Colonel J.K. Bajaj, and Colonel Anshuman Bhadauria have commanded the Nehru Institute of Mountaineering in Uttarkashi.

== Training ==
On 1 May 1952, a training wing of the Parachute Regiment was formed at Kota under the Brigade of the Guards Training Centre, and thus started the direct recruitment and training of recruits for the Parachute Regiment. The regiment started augmenting its strength in 1961. About the same time, in order to ensure a better intake of recruits into the regiment, the raising of a training centre was authorized on 13 March 1963, and the Indian government accorded sanction for the raising of an independent training centre. The executive order for raising the Parachute Regiment Training Centre was received on 22 June 1963. The Parachute Regiment Depot and Records was redesignated as the Parachute Regiment Training Centre, then located at Agra Fort. The first batch of recruits from the Rajputana Rifles, Rajput Regiment, Sikh Regiment, and Dogra Regiment started arriving in the training depots located at Kheria Camp. On 26 September 1963, the Parachute Regiment training wing at Kota joined the centre. On 5 February 1965, the centre moved to Morar Cantonment, Gwalior. In addition to conducting training, Parachute Regiment recruits were also responsible for parachute training. For this purpose, a Parachute Holding Wing was established on 1 April 1966.

The Para Holding Wing was responsible for carrying out basic and reserve training for all active and reserve paratroopers. In wartime, the Para Holding Wing had the added responsibility of providing transit camp facilities for the launching of an airborne operation. On 5 June 1967, the Personal Accounts Office (Other Ranks) of the Parachute Regiment also moved from Mathura to Gwalior. On 2 October 1975, the Parachute Regiment Training Centre, Records and PAO (OR) moved to Agra. On 15 January 1977, the erstwhile Para Holding Wing was disbanded, and additional staff and vehicles were authorised to the Parachute Regiment Training Centre to carry out all of the above functions of the Para Holding Wing. The Para Holding Wing continued functioning from Kheria, and its old name was retained. The Para Holding Wing thereafter merged with the Army Airborne Training School, Agra, on 15 January 1992. The Parachute Regiment Training Centre, along with the Records and PAO (OR), moved to Bengaluru and occupied the erstwhile location of the Pioneer Corps and Training Centre.

== Insignia ==
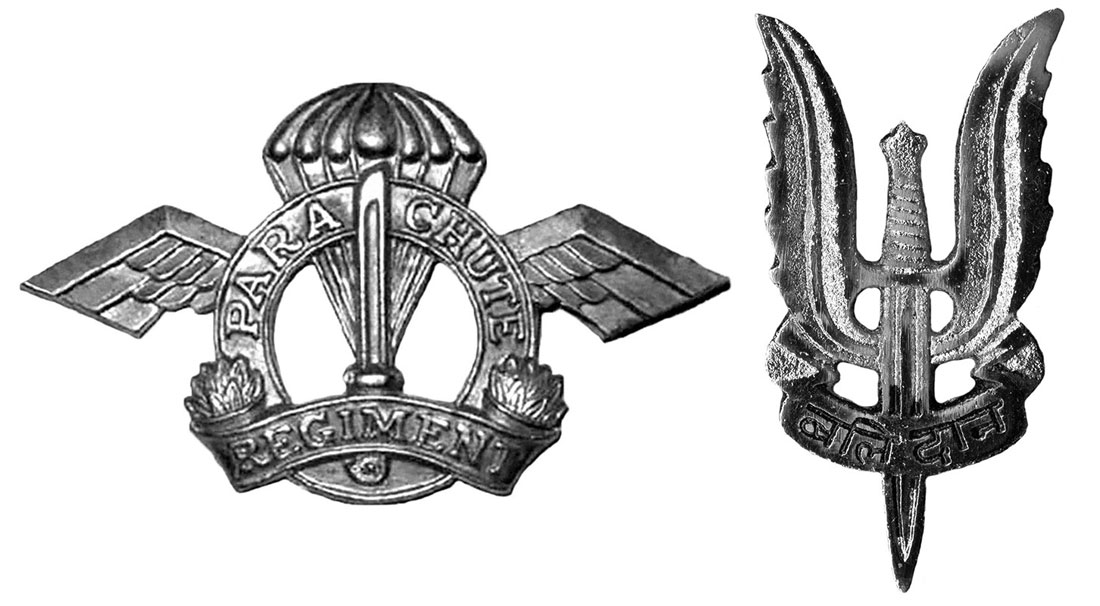

The regimental badge for the Parachute Regiment is an open parachute, partially behind a circle with the word "Parachute" at the top and a scroll at the bottom with the word "Regiment"; wings are spread out from the circle, and a dagger is superimposed on the parachute and upper portion of the circle; the whole is in silver metal. As with much of the world's parachute forces, the normal headgear is a maroon beret, although there is a maroon turban for Sikh personnel. The special forces, which form part of the Parachute Regiment, have a distinct insignia called Balidaan, which has a commando dagger point downwards, with upward-extending wings extending from the blade and a scroll superimposed on the blade with "Balidaan" inscribed in Devanagari; the whole in silver metal on an upright red plastic rectangle. The Balidaan is modeled on the world-famous cap and beret badge of the Special Air Service. The special forces personnel also wear a maroon curved shoulder title with "Special Forces" embroidered in light blue, succeeding the "Commando" tab in 2006, which was in use since inception.

There remains a single airborne brevet: an open parachute in white, with light blue wings extended from it, the whole on a grey-green drab background. Some other variants have existed for ceremonial/mess uniforms, e.g., with gold wired wings on a maroon flannel, the same on a scarlet background for the President's Bodyguard on their ceremonial tunics. This was formerly worn on the upper right sleeve, but since 1975 appears above the right chest pocket and name tab. There is also a small, enamelled version (white parachute with blue, yellow, or red wings) worn on the left pocket as Jump Indicator Wings for 25 to 100 descents, respectively. The small, enamelled badge has now been replaced by a brass badge called Para Indicator Badge with stars at the bottom of the parachute, with one star denoting 25 jumps, two stars 50, and three stars 100.

== Units ==
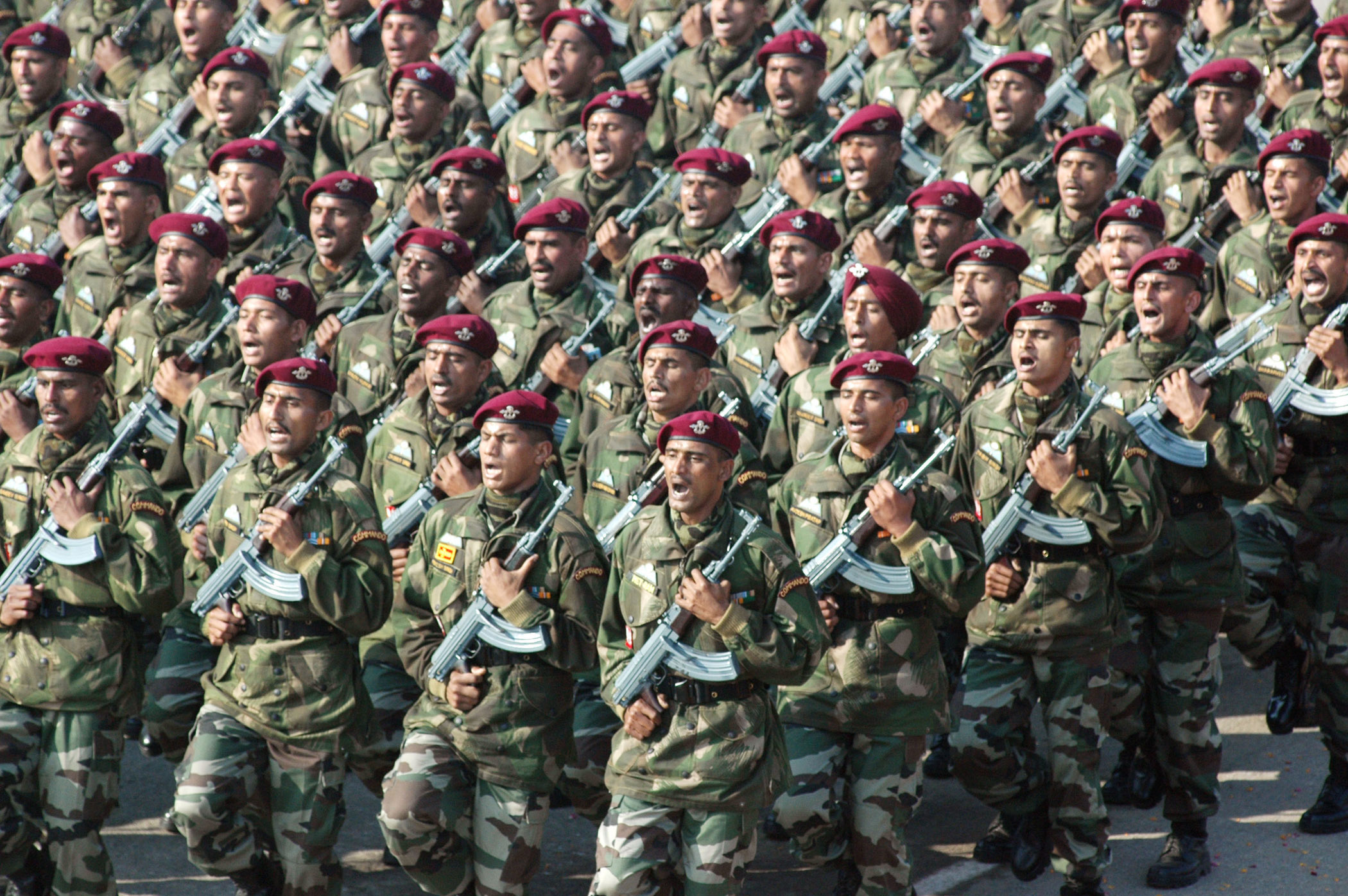
A marching contingent of the regiment during the 58th Republic Day Parade, 2007

The regiment has a total of fifteen regular Special Forces battalions, one Rashtriya Rifles battalion, and two Territorial Army battalions. These Commando units are now designated as Special Forces.

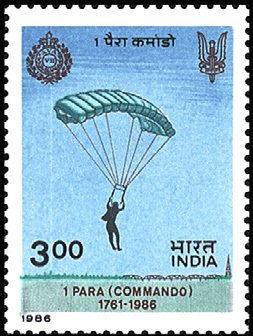
Commemorative stamp – 1 Para Commando Parachute Regiment (1986)

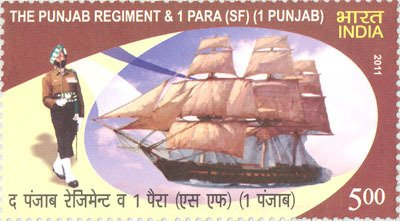
Commemorative stamp – 250th Anniversary of the Punjab Regiment and 1 Para (SF) (2011)

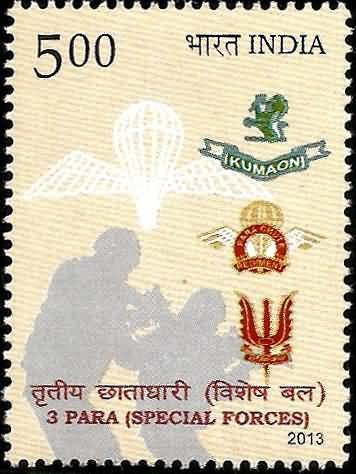
Commemorative stamp – 3 Para (Special Forces) (2013)

10 Para (SF) team which captured Chachro, December 1971

Battalion	Raising Date	Nicknames	Remarks	References
1st Battalion	1761	Cooke ki paltan, Red Devils, Pratham’s	Raised at Trichinopoly as the 8th Battalion Coast Sepoys. It underwent numerous redesignations, including 7th Carnatic Battalion (1770), 7th Madras Battalion (1774), the 1st Battalion, 7th Regiment of Madras Native Infantry (1796), 7th Regiment of Madras Native Infantry (1824), 7th Regiment of Madras Infantry (1885), 7th Madras Infantry (1901), 67th Punjabis (1903), 1/2nd Punjab Regiment (1922), and 1st Battalion, Punjab Regiment. In 1952, the battalion was converted to 1 Para (Punjab). The suffix 'Punjab' was later dropped in 1960 and later redesignated as 1 Para (Commando) in 1978. In 1979, conversion into a Special Forces battalion over a three-year period began. Pre independence battle honours – Sholinghur, Carnatic, Mysore, Maheidpore, Ava, China, Pegu, Lucknow, Burma 1885–87, Afghanistan 1919, Loos, France and Flanders 1915, Helles, Krithia, Gallipoli 1915, Suez Canal, Egypt 1915, Meggido, Sharon, Nablus, Palestine 1918, Aden, Defence of Kut al Amara, Kut al Amara 1917, Baghdad, Mesopotamia 1915-18, N.W. Frontier, India 1915 '16–17. Post independence battle honour Hajipir.	
2nd Battalion	1797	Predators	Raised at Calicut as 2nd Battalion, 5th (Travancore) Regiment of Bombay Native Infantry. Re-designated 10th Regiment of Bombay Native Infantry (1824), 10th Regiment of Bombay Native (Light) Infantry (1871), 10th Regiment of Bombay (Light) Infantry (1885), 10th Bombay Light Infantry (1901), 110th Mahratta Light Infantry (1903), 3/5th Mahratta Light Infantry (1922) and finally 3rd Battalion, Maratha Light Infantry. After conversion, 3rd battalion, Maratha Light Infantry (Para). In 1999, converted into a Special Forces battalion. The unit has won 25 Battle Honours and 5 Theatre honours.	
3rd Battalion	8 March 1813	Russel's Vipers	Raised at Bolarum by Sir Henry Russel as 2nd battalion, Russel’s Brigade. Became 2nd Regiment of Infantry, Nizam’s Army (1826), 2nd Infantry, Hyderabad Contingent (1854), 95th Russel’s Infantry (1903), 10th Battalion (Russel’s), 19th Hyderabad Regiment (1922), 1st Kumaon Regiment. Designated 1st battalion, Kumaon Regiment (Para) at the time of independence. Took part in both the world wars. Theatre honour J & K 1947-48, battle honour Shelatang and Poonch. Awarded COAS unit citation thrice. In November 2003, converted into a Special Forces battalion.	
4th Battalion	1 August 1961	Mighty Daggers	Raised in Agra as the first parachute battalion after independence. In 2003, converted into a Special Forces battalion.	
5th Battalion	1 January 1963	Batalik	Raised by Lieutenant Colonel KG Pitre at Kota. Awarded COAS unit citation thrice.	
6th Battalion	1 February1963	Sakht Para	Raised at Agra. Took part in Operation Cactus. Converted to special forces in 2002.	
7th Battalion	1 October 1964	SE7EN	Raised by Lieutenant Colonel PS Nair at Agra. Converted to special forces in 2002.	
9th Battalion	1 July 1966	Pirates, Mountain Rats, Ghost Operators	Traces its roots from the Meghdoot Force raised during the 1965 war. Raised at Gwalior by Major Megh Singh of 3 Guards as the first official Para Commando battalion, with the Meghdoot Force veterans forming its core. Though initially intended for the Brigade of the Guards, the unit was integrated into the Parachute Regiment. Designated special forces unit in 1994.	
10th Battalion	1 June 1967	Desert Scorpions	Split from the 9th Battalion, and raised as 10th Battalion, Parachute Regiment (Commando) at Gwalior with Lieutenant Colonel NS Utthaya as the first commanding officer. Theatre honour Sindh 1971 and Kargil 1999, battle honour Chachro. Awarded COAS unit citation thrice. Designated special forces unit in 1994.	
11th Battalion	1 February 2011	Vipers	Raised at Agra.	
12nd Battalion	2013	Dirty Dozens	Raised as a para special forces battalion at Agra by Colonel HS Lidder.	
13th Battalion	1 May 2022	Thunderbolt Thirteen	Raised at Bangalore as a para special forces battalion.	
21st Battalion	11 February 1985	Waghnakhs	Raised as 21st Battalion, The Maratha Light Infantry at Belgaum. Conversion began from 1994, and converted to Para on 1 February 1996. Now a special forces battalion.	
23rd Battalion		Devil’s Own	Raised as 23rd Battalion, The Rajputana Rifles. Converted to 23 Para (Airborne) in 2011, converted to Special Forces in 2022.	
29th Battalion	1997	Airborne Rajputs	Raised as 29th Battalion, The Rajput Regiment. Converted to special forces in 2022.	
106th Parachute Infantry Battalion (Territorial Army)	1 October 1960	Bengaluru Terriers	Based at Bengaluru, Karnataka.	
116th Parachute Infantry Battalion (Territorial Army)			Based at Deolali, Maharashtra	
31st Battalion, The Rashtriya Rifles (Commando)				

Former units

The 8th Battalion raised in 1965 was transferred out and redesignated as the 16th Battalion, The Mahar Regiment in 1975. In 1981, the battalion was converted to 12th Battalion, The Mechanised Infantry Regiment. When the 8th Battalion was converted, a sizeable part of the battalion was retained in the airborne role for some time, forming the armored element of the 50th Parachute Brigade, equipped with BMP-2 infantry fighting vehicles. However, due to administrative and logistical reasons, that unit was discontinued, and their role was taken over by the parachute battalions themselves, with a platoon strength of each battalion being trained and equipped for the mechanised role within the brigade. Four of the special forces' battalions were originally trained for combatting in certain environments. The 1st battalion was the strategic reserve, the 9th battalion was trained for mountains, the 10th battalion was trained for deserts, and the 21st battalion was trained for jungle warfare. However, all the special forces battalions are trained for all environments and combat roles.

== Colonels of the Regiment ==
The Colonel of the regiment is a senior officer of the regiment, usually the senior-most, who is a father-figure to the regiment and looks after the interests of the regiment. This is a tradition and position that the Indian Army has inherited from the British Army. The officers who have graced this position are as follows -

- Maj. Gen. K Bhagwati Singh
- Lt. Gen. Inderjit Singh Gill, PVSM, MC
- Maj. Gen. SC Sinha, PVSM
- Lt. Gen. M Thomas, PVSM, AVSM, VSM
- Lt. Gen. V. K. Nayar, PVSM, SM
- Maj. Gen. JN Goel
- Maj. Gen. RP Limaye, AVSM
- Maj. Gen. Shivaji Patil, UYSM, AVSM
- Maj. Gen. Hoshiar Singh, YSM
- Lt. Gen. Nirbhay Sharma, PVSM, UYSM, AVSM, VSM
- Lt. Gen. HS Lidder, PVSM, UYSM, YSM, VSM
- Lt. Gen. PC Katoch, PVSM, UYSM, AVSM, SC
- Lt. Gen. Prabodh Chandra Bhardwaj, PVSM, AVSM, VrC, SC, VSM
- Lt. Gen. Vinod Bhatia, PVSM, AVSM, SM
- Lt. Gen. NS Ghei, PVSM, AVSM**, ADC
- Lt. Gen. PS Sangha, PVSM, UYSM, AVSM, SM
- Maj. Gen. Sanjay Singh, AVSM, SM**, VSM
- Lt. Gen. Pushpendra Pal Singh, SM**

== Honorary Officers ==
- Mahendra Singh Dhoni was commissioned into the 106th Infantry Battalion, Territorial Army with the rank of Lt. Colonel by the President of India on 1 November 2011
- Deepak Rao was commissioned into the 116th Infantry Battalion, Territorial Army with the rank of Major by the President of India on 1 November 2011. He is cited to be India's foremost pioneer and specialist in close-quarter warfare by the Indian Ministry of Defence. His method of reflex shooting has been used to modernize close quarter combat shooting in Northern Command and Eastern Command under directive of Army commanders.

== Decorations ==
=== Battle Honours ===
- 3 PARA (Kumaon) - Shelatang, Jammu & Kashmir 1947
- 2 PARA (Maratha) - Jhangar, Jammu & Kashmir 1947
- 1 PARA - Hajipir, Jammu & Kashmir 1965
- 6 PARA - Jallo, Lahore 1965
- 2 PARA - Poongli Bridge, East Pakistan 1971
- 4 PARA - Sand Dune, Ganganagar 1971
- 10 PARA CDO - Chachro, Sindh 1971
- 9 PARA CDO - Mandhol, Jammu & Kashmir 1971
- 6 PARA - Maldives 1988
- 5 PARA - Batalik, Kargil 1999

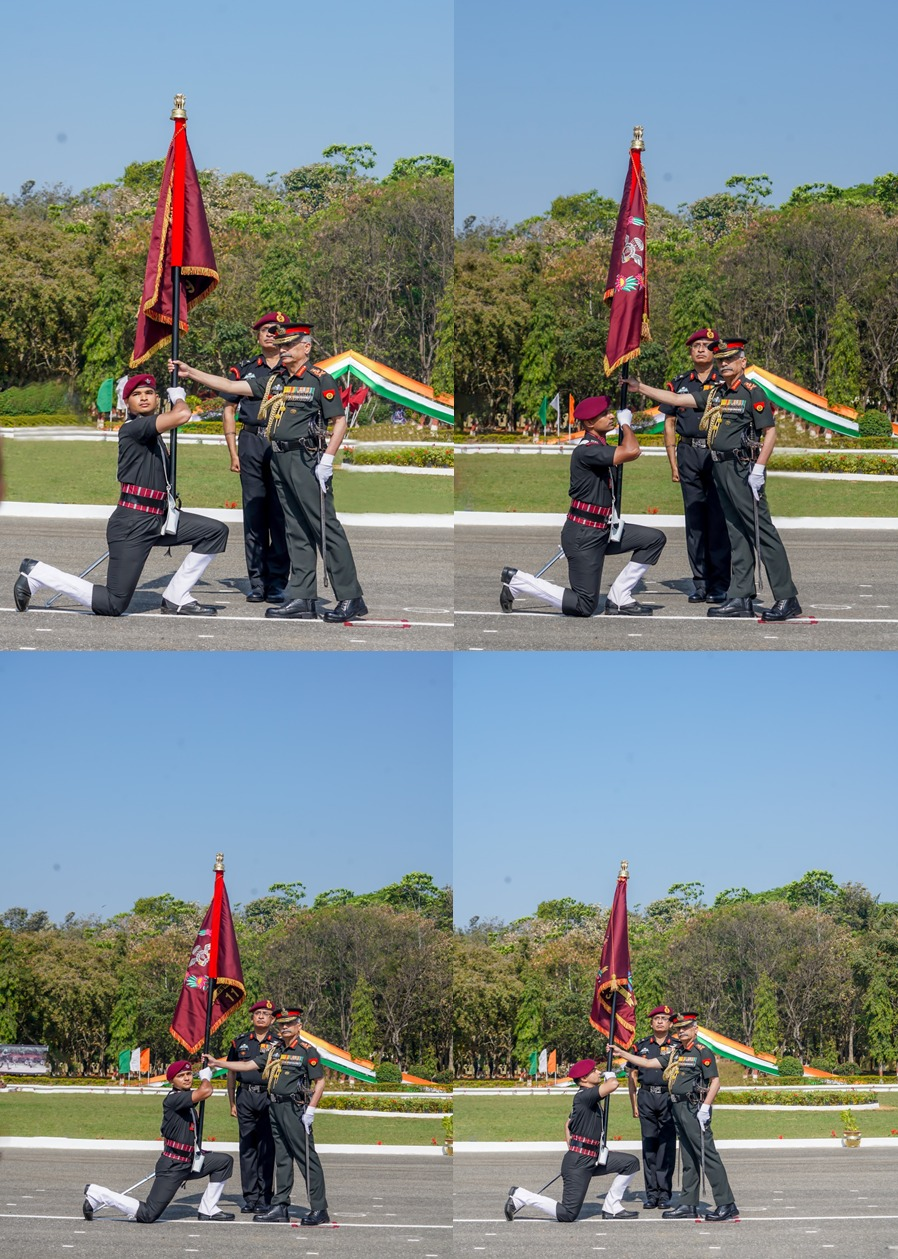
Army Chief Presents President's Colours to four units of the Parachute Regiment (11, 21, 23 and 29 Para)

=== Post-1947 ===
Theatre Honours

- 2 PARA (MARATHA) - Jammu & Kashmir 1947–1948
- 3 PARA (KUMAON) - Jammu & Kashmir 1947–1948
- 1 PARA (PUNJAB) - Jammu & Kashmir 1947–1948
- 1 PARA - Jammu & Kashmir 1965
- 2 PARA - East Pakistan (Bangladesh) 1971
- 9 PARA CDO - Jammu & Kashmir 1971
- 10 PARA CDO - Sindh 1971
- 5 PARA - Kargil 1999
- 9 PARA CDO - Kargil 1999
- 10 PARA CDO - Kargil 1999

COAS Unit Citation

- 1995 - 9 PARA CDO
- 1996 - 5 PARA
- 1997 - 3 PARA
- 1998 - 1 PARA CDO, 2 PARA
- 2000 - 5 PARA, 6 PARA
- 2001 - 9 PARA CDO, 31 RR CDO
- 2003 - 3 PARA, 9 PARA SF
- 2004 - 2 PARA SF, 31 RR CDO
- 2005 - 5 PARA, 10 PARA SF
- 2006 - 1 PARA SF, 21 PARA SF
- 2007 - 3 PARA SF
- 2009 - 2 PARA SF, 10 PARA SF
- 2011 - 1 PARA SF, 21 PARA SF
- 2012 - 4 PARA SF
- 2017 - 9 PARA SF, 4 PARA SF
- 2019 - 1 PARA SF, 9 PARA SF
- 2020 - 23 PARA
- 2021 - 10 PARA SF
- 2023 - 4 PARA SF
- 2024 - 12 PARA SF, 29 PARA SF
- 2025 - 9 PARA SF
- 2026 - 4 PARA SF, 12 PARA SF

CDS Tri Services Unit Citation

- 2023 - 2 PARA SF

Numerous soldiers of the regiment have been awarded honours for bravery in operations. These include:

- Ashoka Chakra - 8
- Maha Vir Chakra - 11
- Kirti Chakra - 13
- Param Vishisht Seva Medal - 07
- Uttam Yudh Seva Medal - 06
- Ati Vishisht Seva Medal - 13
- Vir Chakra - 61
- Shaurya Chakra - 53
- Yudh Seva Medal - 10
- Vishisht Seva Medal - 28
- Sena Medal - 246
- Bar to SM- 11
- MiD-265

Ashoka Chakra

- Capt. Arun Singh Jasrotia, AC, SM, Nishan - E - Khalsa - 9 PARA CDO (1996)
- Maj. Sudhir Kumar Walia, SM** - 9 PARA CDO (2000)
- Ptr. Sanjog Chhetri - 9 PARA SF (2003)
- Capt. Harshan R - 2 PARA SF (2007)
- Hav. Gajender Singh Bisht - 10 PARA SF (2009) on NSG deputation
- Hav. Bahadur Singh Bohra - 10 PARA SF (2009)
- Maj. Mohit Sharma, SM - 1 PARA SF (2009)
- L/Nk Mohan Nath Goswami - 9 PARA SF (2016)

Maha Vir Chakra

- Brig. Mohammad Usman - 50(I) PARA BDE (1948)
- Lt Col. Harbansh Singh Virk - 2 PARA (1948)
- Maj. AK Ramaswamy - 2 PARA (1948)
- Maj. SMS Brar - 3 PARA (1948)
- Ptr. Man Singh - 3 PARA (1948)
- Maj. SP Chopra - 2 PARA (1948)
- Lt Col. Dharam Singh - 3 PARA (1948)
- Maj. RS Dayal - 1 PARA (1965)
- Lt Col. Sawai Bhawani Singh - 10 PARA CDO (1971)
- Maj. Vijay Kumar Berry - 4 PARA (1971)
- Lt Col. Kulwant Singh Pannu - 2 PARA (1971)

Kirti Chakra

- Ptr. Jagpal Singh - PARA (1985)
- Sub. Mahavir Singh Yadav - 1 PARA CDO (1985)
- Naik. Bansode YM - 2 PARA (1991)
- Maj. Ivan Joseph Crastro - 1 PARA CDO (1993)
- Lt Col. Sunil Kumar Razdan - 7 PARA (1996)
- Hav. Badri Lal Lunawat - 10 PARA CDO (1999)
- Capt. R Subramanian - 1 PARA CDO (2001)
- N/Sub. Ishwar Singh - 5 PARA (2002)
- Capt. Sajjan Singh Malik - 10 PARA SF (2005)
- Maj. Manish Hiraji Pitambre - 3 PARA SF (2007)
- Maj. Shubash Chand Punia - 21 PARA SF (2008)
- Ptr. Shabir Ahmed Malik - 1 PARA SF (2009)
- Sub. Indra Bahadur Pun - 4 PARA SF (2009)
- Capt. Zala Ajitkumar Arshibhai - 2 PARA SF (2009)
- Lt Col. Saurab Singh Shekhawat - 21 PARA SF (2009)
- Capt. Davinder Singh Jass - 1 PARA SF (2010)
- Lt. Vikas Sharma - 6 PARA (2011)
- Lt Col. Nectar Sanjenbam - 21 PARA SF (2015)
- Capt. Jaidev Dangi - 10 PARA SF (2015)
- Sub. Mahendra Singh - 9 PARA SF (2016)
- Maj. Rohit Suri - 4 PARA SF (2017)
- Sub. Sanjeev Kumar - 4 PARA SF (2021)
- Maj. Digvijay Singh Rawat - 21 PARA SF (2024)
- Hav. Abdul Majid - 9 PARA SF (2024)

Bar to Sena Medal (Gallantry)

- Capt. Sudhir Kumar Walia - 9 PARA CDO (1994)
- Maj. Deepak Singh Bisht - 1 PARA CDO (2002)
- Col. Anup Singh Dhar - 5 PARA (2004)
- Maj. Anil Gorshi - 6 PARA (2005)
- Maj. Pranay Padmakar Panwar - 4 PARA SF (2011)
- Capt. Umesh Lamba - 1 PARA SF (2018)
- Hav. Rajesh Kumar - 1 PARA SF (2018)
- Lt Col. Bheemaiah PS - 10 PARA SF (2019)
- N/Sub. Anil Kumar - 9 PARA SF (2020)
- Maj. Nitish Tyagi - 12 PARA SF (2023)
- Maj. A Ranjith Kumar - 23 PARA (2023)

Arjuna Award

- Col. Avtar Singh Cheema - 7 PARA (1965)
- Col. Balwant Sandhu - 6 PARA (1981)

Tenzing Norgay National Adventure Award

- Col. Balwant Sandhu - 6 PARA (2010)
- Col. Sarfraz Singh, VSM - 6 PARA (2019)

== See also ==
- List of regiments of the Indian Army
- Para (Special Forces)
- 50th Parachute Brigade (India)
