= Mahendragiri =

Mahendragiri is the name of the following places in India:

- Mahendragiri, Odisha, a hill or mountain in Eastern Ghats, Gajapati district, Odisha, India
- Mahendragiri, Tamil Nadu, a hill or mountain in Eastern Ghats, Tirunelveli District, Tamil Nadu, India
- Mahendra Mountains, mountain range described in Indian epics, identified with the Eastern Ghats

== See also ==
- Indragiri (disambiguation)
