= Rengat =

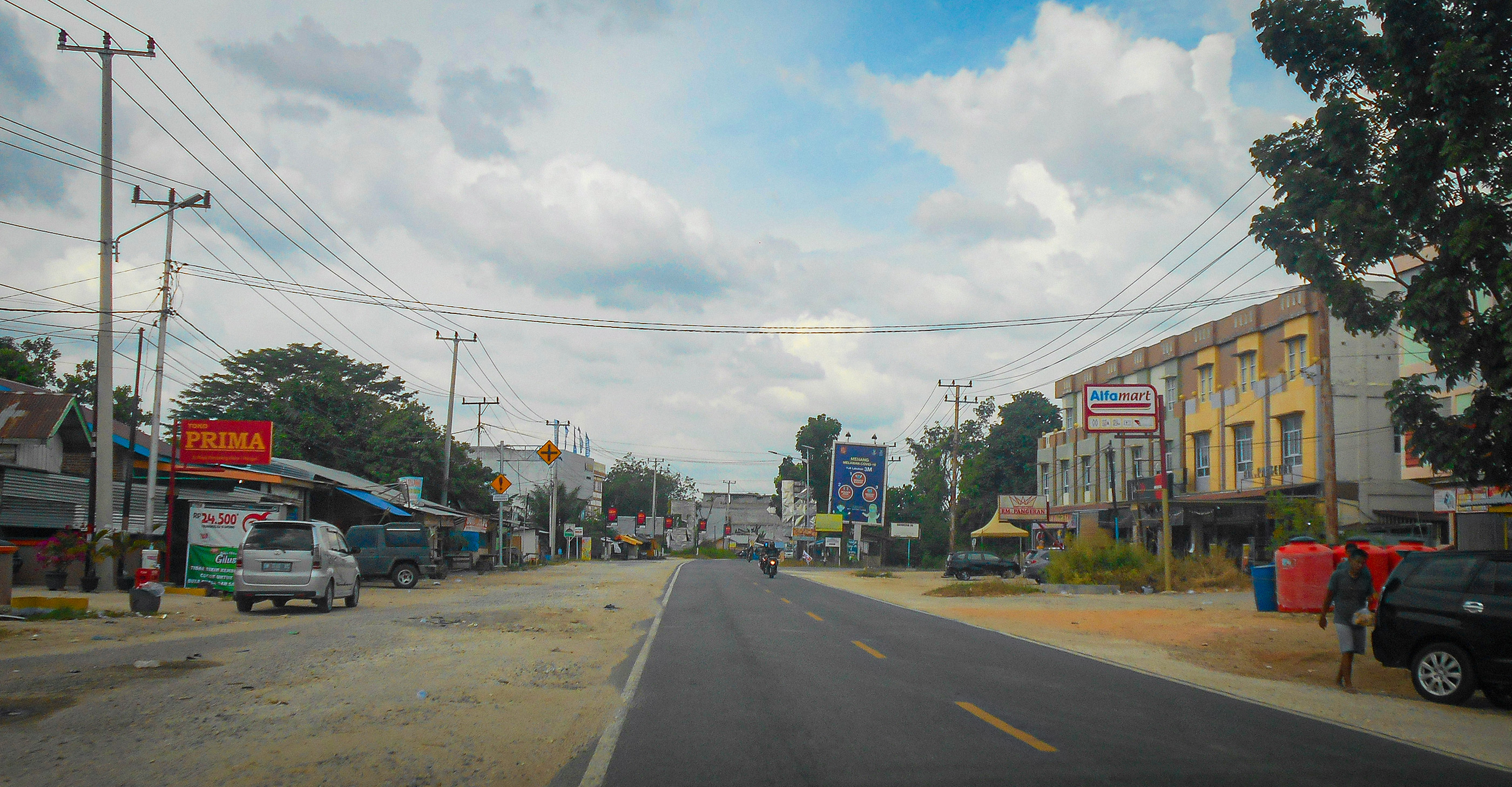
- Rengat Highway - Rengat, Indragiri Hulu
- Interactive map of Rengat
- Coordinates: 0°22′30″S 102°32′49″E
- Country: Indonesia
- Province: Riau
- Time zone: UTC+7 (WIB)
- Airport: Japura Airport

Rengat (Jawi: رڠت ) is a kecamatan (district) in Riau province of Indonesia and it is the serves as capital (seat) of Indragiri Hulu Regency. The town is traversed by Indragiri River

Theres a conservation forest monitored by WWF. Conservation status of this forest is underpressure from illegal resource extraction.

The indigenous inhabitant of the district are Talang Mamak people. Other ethnic group that is present in Rengat include: Malays, Minangkabau, Batak, Chinese Indonesian, and Sunda.

== The Rengat massacre ==
During the Indonesian National Revolution in 1949, Dutch paratroopers attacked Rengat. This event eventually called Rengat Massacre.Number of fatalities resulted from this event is very much disputed.

Indonesian sources estimates thousands killed. In contrast, Dutch documents show that 80 inhabitants were killed. Subsequent research indicates the actual numer number is significantly higher than official Dutch figure.

== Culture ==
Theres a monument is dedicated to the victims of the Rengat Massacre, Among those commemorated is the father of the noted Indonesian poet, Chairil Anwar.

The town is known for its local fruit, the kedondong (ambarella, Spondias dulcis). In the town center features a clock tower that includes a monument sculpted to resemble the fruit. Beside that there are local delicacies using the fruit called dodol kedondong. A toffee like confection made out of the processed fruit

== Climate ==
Climate data for Rengat (Japura Airport) (1991−2020 normals, extremes 1991−2023)
Month	Jan	Feb	Mar	Apr	May	Jun	Jul	Aug	Sep	Oct	Nov	Dec	Year
Record high °C (°F)	35.8 (96.4)	35.0 (95.0)	35.8 (96.4)	36.0 (96.8)	35.6 (96.1)	36.4 (97.5)	36.4 (97.5)	35.4 (95.7)	35.8 (96.4)	35.4 (95.7)	35.8 (96.4)	35.0 (95.0)	36.4 (97.5)
Mean daily maximum °C (°F)	31.3 (88.3)	31.7 (89.1)	32.5 (90.5)	32.6 (90.7)	32.9 (91.2)	32.6 (90.7)	32.2 (90.0)	32.3 (90.1)	32.3 (90.1)	32.4 (90.3)	31.9 (89.4)	31.4 (88.5)	32.2 (89.9)
Daily mean °C (°F)	26.3 (79.3)	26.6 (79.9)	26.9 (80.4)	27.1 (80.8)	27.5 (81.5)	27.3 (81.1)	26.9 (80.4)	26.9 (80.4)	26.8 (80.2)	26.8 (80.2)	26.7 (80.1)	26.5 (79.7)	26.9 (80.3)
Mean daily minimum °C (°F)	22.9 (73.2)	23.1 (73.6)	23.0 (73.4)	23.5 (74.3)	23.5 (74.3)	23.3 (73.9)	23.0 (73.4)	22.8 (73.0)	22.9 (73.2)	23.1 (73.6)	23.1 (73.6)	23.2 (73.8)	23.1 (73.6)
Record low °C (°F)	19.4 (66.9)	18.4 (65.1)	19.2 (66.6)	20.0 (68.0)	20.0 (68.0)	20.0 (68.0)	18.6 (65.5)	17.8 (64.0)	18.8 (65.8)	19.2 (66.6)	19.0 (66.2)	19.4 (66.9)	17.8 (64.0)
Average precipitation mm (inches)	194.3 (7.65)	170.8 (6.72)	244.0 (9.61)	267.7 (10.54)	191.7 (7.55)	136.5 (5.37)	115.5 (4.55)	130.6 (5.14)	148.2 (5.83)	232.6 (9.16)	330.6 (13.02)	247.9 (9.76)	2,410.4 (94.90)
Average precipitation days (≥ 1.0 mm)	14.6	11.8	15.2	15.5	12.4	8.9	9.9	9.1	10.9	13.0	16.4	15.6	153.3
Mean monthly sunshine hours	92.6	100.0	114.7	126.3	139.8	129.1	137.3	123.5	106.1	106.1	101.4	86.0	1,362.9
Source 1: World Meteorological Organization
Source 2: Starlings Roost Weather

== Hotels ==
Name	Classification
Danau Raja Hotel Rengat	★★★

== Tourism ==
Some interesting places in Rengat, among others:

- Raja Lake (Danau Raja)
- The Great Mosque of Rengat (Masjid Raya Rengat)
- Bukit Tigapuluh National Park (Taman Nasional Bukit Tigapuluh)
- Menduyan Lake (Danau Menduyan)
- Hulu Lake (Danau Hulu)
- Tall House (Rumah Tinggi)
- Sungai Arang Waterfall (Air Terjun Sungai Arang)
- Pontianai Waterfall (Air Terjun Pontianai)
- Pejangki Waterfall (Air Terjun Pejangki)
- Nunusan Waterfall (Air Terjun Nunusal)
- Siamang Waterfall (Air Terjun Siamang)
- Buyung Waterfall (Air Terjun Buyung)
- Pintu Tujuh Waterfall (Air Terjun Pintu Tujuh)
- Tembulun Waterfall (Air Terjun Tembulun)
- Bukit Lancang Waterfall (Air Terjun Bukit Lancang)
- Sungai Pampang Cave (Gua Sungai Pampang)
- Sungai Keruh Cave (Gua Sungai Keruh)
- Sungai Kandi Cave (Gua Sungai Kandi)
- Duplicate of Indragiri Palace (Duplikat Istana Indragiri)
- Kijang Serong Boat (Royal Boat) [Perahu Kijang Serong (Perahu Kebesaran Raja)]
- Loyang Pond (Kolam Loyang)
- Indigenous Culture of Talang Mamak (Budaya Suku Asli Talang Mamak)

== Other meanings ==
Rengat is also the name of a male Sumatran tiger at the Toronto Zoo.
