= Indragiri Hulu Regency =

Regency in Riau, Indonesia

Coordinates: 0°21′00″S 102°31′59″E

Indragiri Hulu Regency Kabupaten Indragiri Hulu
- Regency
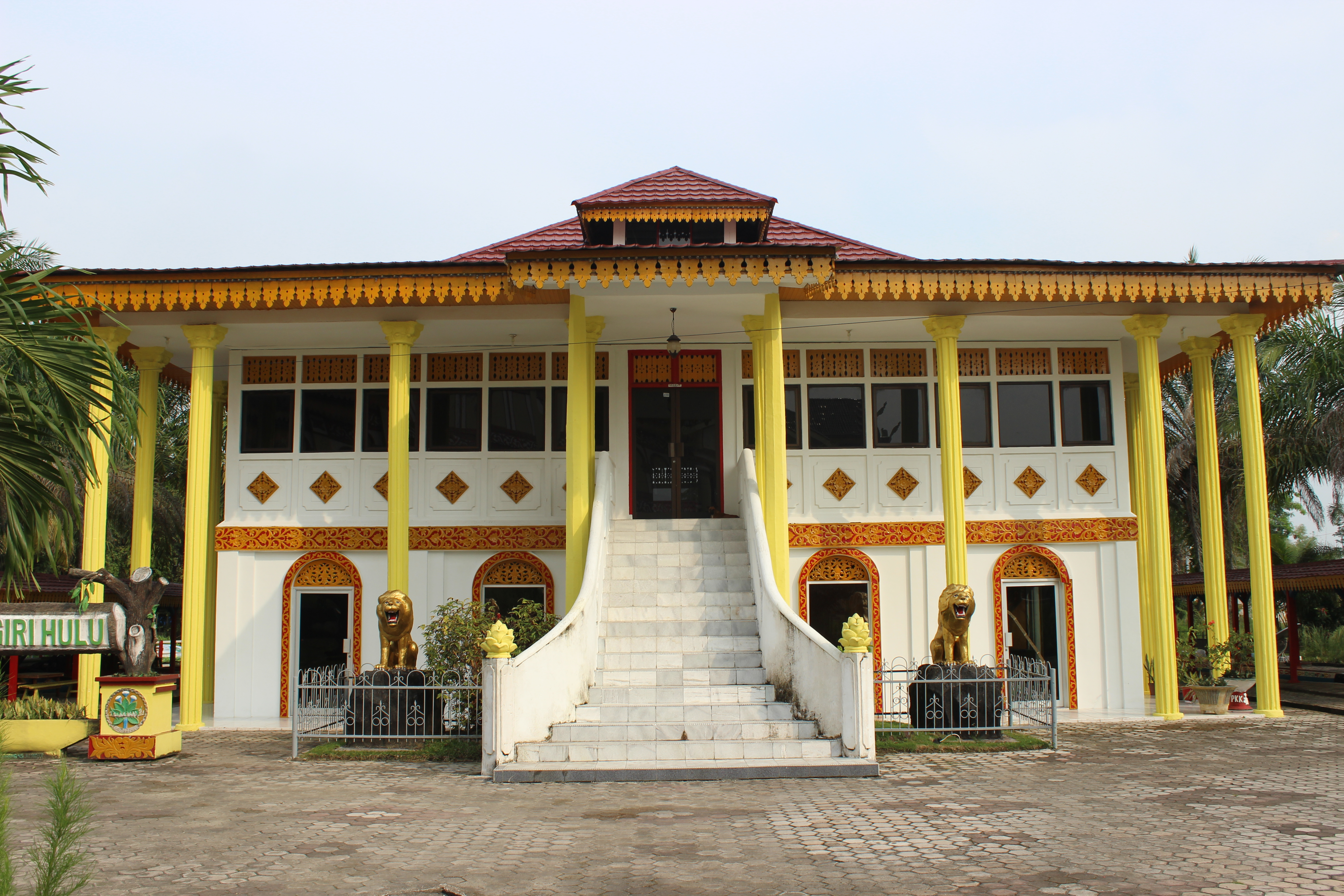
- Malay traditional house in Indragiri Hulu

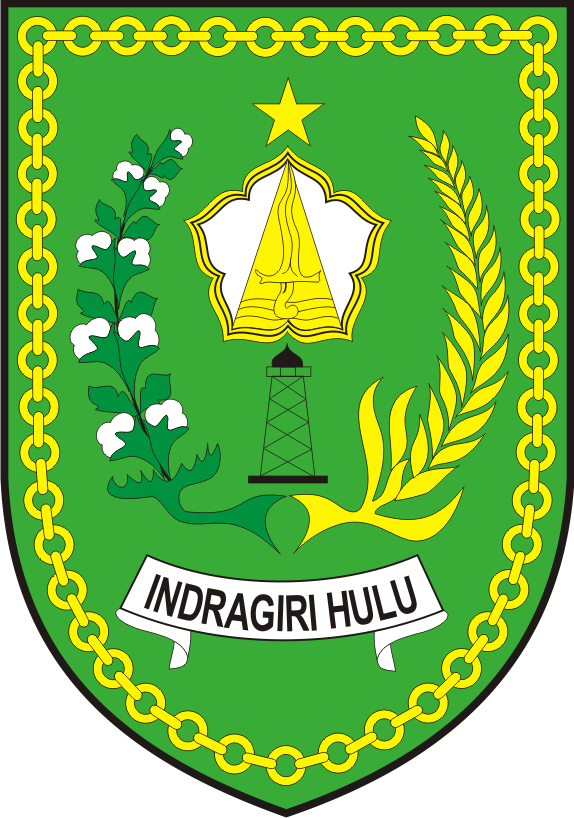
- Coat of arms

- Country: Indonesia
- Province: Riau
- Regency seat: Rengat

Government
  - Regent: Ade Agus Hartanto
  - Vice Regent: Hendrizal

Area
  - Total: 8,198.21 km^{2} (3,165.35 sq mi)

Population (2025 estimate)
  - Total: 490,861
  - Density: 59.8742/km^{2} (155.073/sq mi)
- Time zone: UTC+7 (WIB)
- Website: www.inhu.go.id

Indragiri Hulu ([indraˌɡiri ˈhulu]) or Upper Indragiri is a landlocked regency (kabupaten) of Riau, Indonesia. It is located on the island of Sumatra. The original regency was split in two on 4 October 1999, with the western half being created as a separate Kuantan Singingi Regency. The residual regency now has an area of 8,198.71 km^{2} and had a population of 363,442 at the 2010 census, and 444,548 at the 2020 census; the official estimate as at mid 2025 was 490,861 (comprising 251,498 males and 239,363 females). The administrative seat of the regency is located at the town of Rengat.

== Administrative districts ==
The regency is divided into fourteen districts (kecamatan), listed below with their areas and their populations at the 2010 census and the 2020 census, together with the official estimates as at mid 2025. The table also includes the locations of the district administrative centres, the number of administrative villages in each district (totaling 178 rural desa and 16 urban kelurahan), and its post code.

Kode Wilayag	Name of District (kecamatan)	Area in km^{2}	Pop'n census 2010	Pop'n census 2020	Pop'n estimate mid 2025	Admin centre	No. of villages	Post code
14.02.05	Peranap	1,700.98	28,231	35,161	39,571	Peranap	12 ^{(a)}	29357
14.02.14	Batang Peranap	^{(b)}	8,980	13,252	15,430	Selunak	10	29354
14.02.06	Seberida	960.29	46,155	56,571	61,960	Pangkalan Kasai	11 ^{(c)}	29371
14.02.07	Batang Cenaku	970.00	28,393	40,736	51,431	Aur Cina	20	29355
14.02.08	Batang Gansal	950.00	26,890	33,272	36,687	Seberida	10	29356
14.02.03	Kelayang	879.84	21,288	24,542	27,187	Simpang Kelayang	17 ^{(c)}	29352
14.02.13	Rakit Kulim	^{(b)}	19,833	23,836	26,442	Petonggan	19	29359
14.02.04	Pasir Penyu	372.50	31,116	36,234	38,119	Air Molek	13 ^{(d)}	29358
14.02.09	Lirik	233.60	23,418	27,624	28,906	Lirik Area	17	29353
14.02.11	Sungai Lala	^{(b)}	12,938	16,608	18,421	Kelawat	12	29363
14.02.12	Lubuk Batu Jaya	^{(b)}	18,560	22,981	24,192	Lubuk Batu Tinggal	9	29350
14.02.02	Rengat Barat (West Rengat)	921.00	39,819	48,573	53,419	Permatang Reba	18 ^{(c)}	29351 ^{(e)}
14.02.01	Rengat	1,210.50	46,049	50,603	53,239	Rengat	16 ^{(f)}	29311: 29319
14.02.10	Kuala Cenaku	^{(b)}	11,772	14,555	15,857	Kuala Cenaku	10	29335
	Totals	8,198.71	363,442	444,548	490,861	Rengat	194	

Notes: (a) including 2 kelurahan - Baturijal Hilir and Peranap. (b) the area of this district is still included in the figures for the district from which it was cut out. (c) including one kelurahan - the admin centre.
(d) including 5 kelurahan - Air Molek I, Kembang Harum, Sekar Mawar, Tanah Merah and Tanjung Gading.
(e) except the village of Rantau Bakung, which has a post code of 29345.
(f) including 6 kelurahan - Kampung Besar Kota, Kampung Besar Seberang, Kampung Dagang, Pasar Kota, Sekip Hilir and Sekip Hulu.
