= A. G. Rangaraj =

Indian Army medical officer (1917–2009)

Colonel Arcot G Rangaraj MVC**
- Born: 12 March 1917; Arcot, Tamil Nadu
- Died: 23 March 2009 (aged 92)
- Education: Madras Medical College; Willingdon Air Landing School; Osmania University; All India Institute of Medical Sciences, New Delhi
- Military career
- Allegiance: British India; India
- Branch: British Indian Army; Indian Army
- Service years: 1941–1966
- Rank: Colonel
- Service number: MR-252
- Known for: First Indian paratrooper, UN Korean War airborne medical unit commander
- Conflicts: World War II; Burma Campaign; Japanese invasion of India; Battle of Imphal; Indo-Pakistani War of 1947–1948; Korean War; Battle of the Ch'ongch'on River; UN retreat from North Korea; Operation Tomahawk; Battle of Kapyong; Battle of Maryang-san; Second Battle of Maryang-san; Third Battle of the Hook; Battle of the Samichon River; Operation Little Switch; Operation Big Switch; Indian annexation of Goa
- Awards: Maha Vir Chakra; 3rd Grade South Korean Order of Military Merit-Chungmu(2)

Colonel Dr. A. G. Rangaraj, MVC (12 March 1917– 23 March 2009) was an Indian Army medical officer who served in World War II, the Indo-Pakistani War of 1947-48, the Korean War and the Annexation of Goa in a military career spanning 2 decades.

== Early life ==
Rangaraj was born in Arcot, Tamil Nadu, then a part of the Madras Presidency in 1917.

== Military career ==
Rangaraj was a student of medicine at the Madras Medical College from where he graduated in the 1930s. He enlisted for the British Indian Army's Indian Medical Service in 1941 and was posted at the Indian General Hospital in Meerut, after going through basic military training in the same city. While working as a military doctor in India's colonial army, he volunteered to be a part of the 50th Parachute Brigade, which was supposed to be the first ever airborne unit of the Indian Army consisting of the 151 British Parachute Battalion, the 152 Indian Parachute Battalion, and the 153 Gurkha Parachute Battalion. Having received preliminary training from British troops in the Middle East, he finished his Air Landing School in Willingdon which was a part of the Willingdon Airport (now known as the Safdarjung Airport) in New Delhi. With this, he became the first ever Indian paratrooper in history along with Havildar Major Mathura Singh and was posted with the 152 Indian Parachute Battalion as its medical officer.

The Indian Army's Parachute Regiment was officially formed on 1 March 1945 after the merger of the 2nd Indian Airborne Division which consisted of the original 50th Airborne Brigade as well as the 14th and the 77th Parachute Brigades. It had a strength of four battalions and an equal number of independent companies along with various support units. One such unit was the 60th Parachute Field Ambulance, the medical element of the unit. The unit had been raised in 1942 as the 60th Indian Field Ambulance and had performed well in Burma. It was integrated into the 77th Indian Parachute Brigade during the formation of the 2nd Indian Parachute Division. Dr. Rangaraj was posted with the unit and was a part of a 1945 mission to help flood victims in the Hatiya Island.

After the Partition of India, the India Army retained the divisional HQ and the 50th and 77th Parachute Brigades, while the 14th Parachute Brigade went to Pakistan. From 1948 to 1949, Rangaraj, who had been promoted to the rank of Lieutenant Colonel commanded the 60th Parachute Field Ambulance during the First Indo-Pakistani War where it was responsible for running the famous Cariappa Hospital. The hospital catered to the needs of 27 Indian Army and Kashmir State Forces battalions from 1948 until the official peace between the 2 parties was signed in 1949. The hospital constantly faced shortages due to the war situation and inclement weather conditions. Several unit members of the 60PFA were awarded for their distinguished service during the conflict, including Captain V. Rangaswami, who was presented with the Vir Chakra for his bravery.

In June 1950, after the North Korean invasion of Southern Korea and the outbreak of the Korean War, India, which had just gained independence, supported 2 United Nations Security Council Resolution which named North Korea as the aggressor in the conflict. On 7 July, Trygve Lie, the then secretary general of the UN, requested member nations to send peacekeeping troops to assist South Korea against North Korea and the Chinese People's Volunteers, which had by then joined the conflict in support of North Korea and had the backing of the Soviet Union. Dr. Rajendra Prasad then stated that the United Nations should try to localise the Korean Conflict instead of escalating it. On 31 July, the Indian Parliament agreed to send a medical unit to support UN Operations in Korea. This led to the deployment of the 60th Parachute Field Ambulance, led by Lieutenant Colonel Rangaraj in support of the United Nations forces.

== Post military medical career and death ==
While still in the military, Rangaraj received his PhD in Public Health from Osmania University in 1961. He retired from the army in 1966 and completed his course in epidemiology from the All India Institute of Medical Sciences, New Delhi (AIIMS Delhi) in 1967.

He had a successful medical career with agencies such as United Nations International Children's Emergency Fund (UNICEF), World Health Organisation (WHO), United Nations High Commissioner for Refugees (UNHCR) and International Health for Migration where he was involved in various disease eradication programmes. In 1969, he was appointed as the senior WHO adviser on smallpox eradication in Afghanistan and played a major role in eradicating smallpox in the conflict zone alongside Dr. Abdul Mohammad Darmanger, the director of the Afghani smallpox eradication programme. The duo was credited with organizing Afghanistan's first successful public health campaign. He was also sent to Bangladesh as a coordinator of smallpox eradication field programmes. Important figures involved in the mission to eradicate smallpox in Bangladesh have recalled that his encouragement motivated them to continue working hard to achieve their goal even when things did not look good.

== Awards ==
- Maha Vir Chakra: (1951-03-24)
- Republic of Korea Order of Military Merit (Chungmu): twice (1951-08-21, 1951-11-30)
- Republic of Korea Ministry of Patriots and Veterans Affairs - Korean War Hero of the Month: July 2020

== See also ==
- India in the Korean War
- Parachute Regiment (India)
