= History of Australia (1945–present) =

The history of Australia since 1945 has seen long periods of economic prosperity and the introduction of an expanded and multi-ethnic immigration program, which has coincided with moves away from Britain in political, social and cultural terms and towards increasing engagement with the United States and Asia.

== End of the 1940s ==
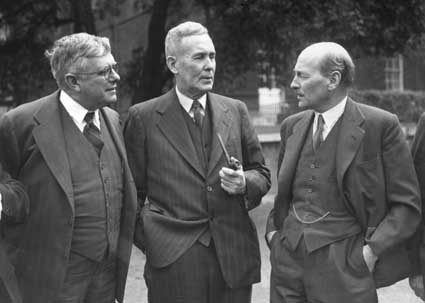
H. V. Evatt (left) and Ben Chifley (middle) with Clement Attlee (right) at the Dominion and British Leaders Conference, London, 1946

In 1944, the Liberal Party of Australia was formed, with Robert Menzies as its founding leader. The party would come to dominate the early decades of the post-war period. Outlining his vision for a new political movement in 1944, Menzies said:

"…[W]hat we must look for, and it is a matter of desperate importance to our society, is a true revival of liberal thought which will work for social justice and security, for national power and national progress, and for the full development of the individual citizen, though not through the dull and deadening process of socialism.

In April 1945, Prime Minister John Curtin despatched an Australian delegation which included attorney-general and minister for external affairs H. V. Evatt to discuss formation of the United Nations. Australia played a significant mediatory role in these early years of the United Nations, successfully lobbying for an increased role for smaller and middle-ranking nations and a stronger commitment to employment rights into the U.N. Charter. Evatt was elected president of the third session of the United Nations General Assembly (September 1948 to May 1949).

When Labor Prime Minister John Curtin died in July 1945, Frank Forde served as prime minister from 6–13 July, before the party elected Ben Chifley as Curtin's successor. Chifley, a former railway engine driver, won the 1946 election. His government introduced national projects, including the Snowy Mountains Scheme and an assisted immigration program and pursued centralist economic policies – making the Commonwealth the collector of income tax, and seeking to nationalise the private banks. At the conference of the New South Wales Labor Party in June 1949, Chifely sought to define the labour movement as having:

[A] great objective – the light on the hill – which we aim to reach by working for the betterment of mankind... [Labor would] bring something better to the people, better standards of living, greater happiness to the mass of the people’.

With an increasingly uncertain economic outlook, after his attempt to nationalise the banks and the coal strike by the Communist-dominated Miners Federation, Chifley lost office at the 1949 federal election to Menzies' newly established Liberal Party, in coalition with the Country Party.

== Immigration and the post-war boom ==
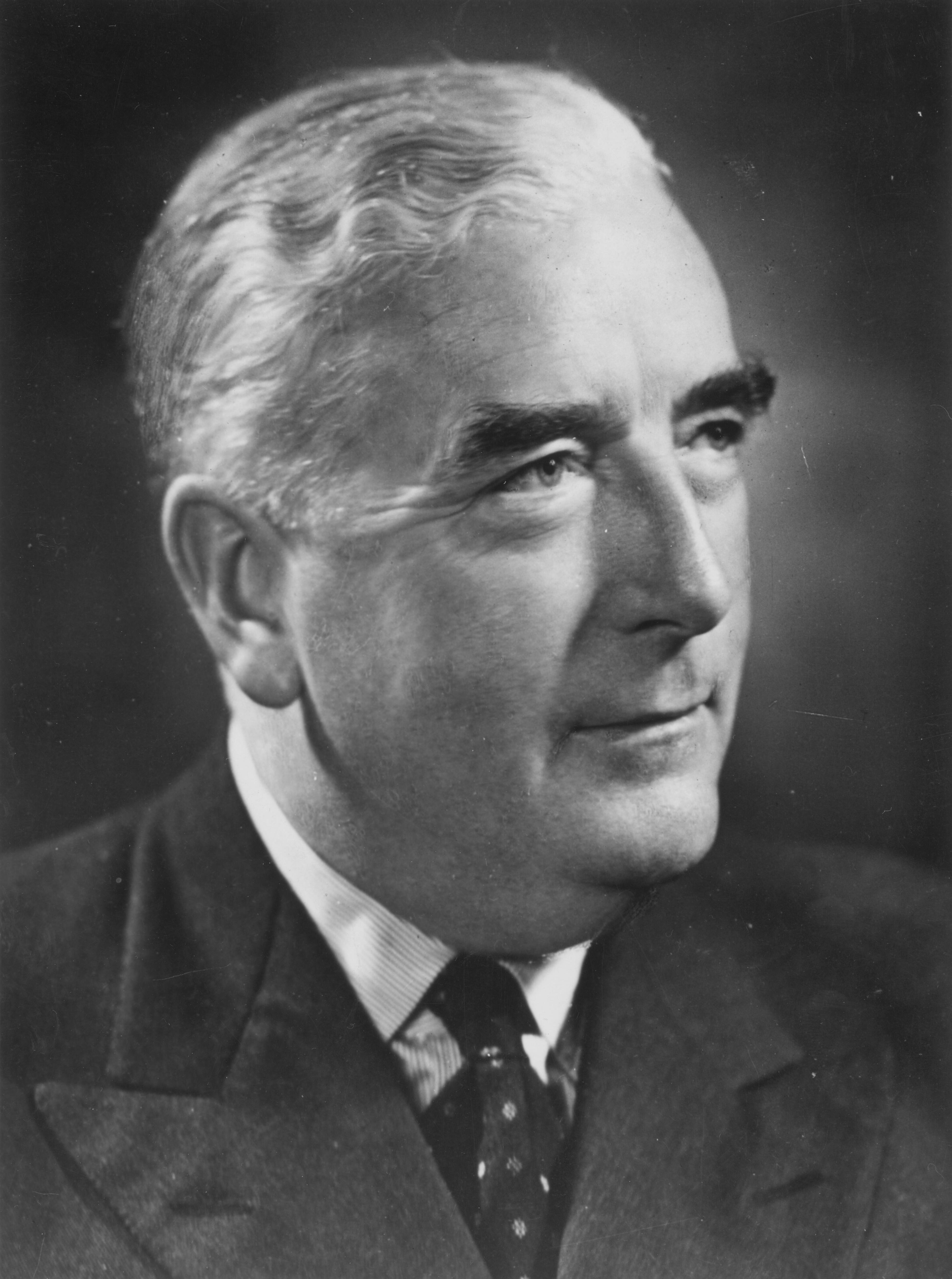
Sir Robert Menzies, founder of the Liberal Party of Australia and Prime Minister of Australia 1939–41 (UAP) and 1949–66

After World War II, Australia launched a massive immigration program, believing that having narrowly avoided a Japanese invasion, Australia must "populate or perish." As Prime Minister Ben Chifley would later declare, "a powerful enemy looked hungrily toward Australia. In tomorrow's gun flash that threat could come again. We must populate Australia as rapidly as we can before someone else decides to populate it for us." Hundreds of thousands of displaced Europeans, including for the first time large numbers of Jews, migrated to Australia. More than two million people immigrated to Australia from Europe during the 20 years after the end of the war.

From the outset, it was intended that the bulk of these immigrants should be mainly from the British Isles, and that the post-war immigration scheme would preserve the British character of Australian society. Although Great Britain remained the predominant source of immigrants, the pool of source countries was expanded to include Continental European countries in order to meet Australia's ambitious immigration targets. From the late 1940s onwards, Australia received significant waves of people from countries such as Greece, Italy, Malta, Germany, Yugoslavia and the Netherlands. Australia actively sought these immigrants, with the government assisting many of them and they found work due to an expanding economy and major infrastructure projects.

The Australian economy stood in sharp contrast to war-ravaged Europe, and newly arrived migrants found employment in a booming manufacturing industry and government assisted programs such as the Snowy Mountains Scheme. This hydroelectricity and irrigation complex in south-east Australia consisted of sixteen major dams and seven power stations constructed between 1949 and 1974. It remains the largest engineering project undertaken in Australia. Necessitating the employment of 100,000 people from over 30 countries, to many it denotes the birth of multicultural Australia.

In 1949 the 1941–1949 Labor government (led by Ben Chifley after John Curtin's death in 1945) was defeated by a Liberal–National Party Coalition government headed by Menzies. Politically, the Menzies government and the Liberal Party of Australia dominated much of the immediate post-war era, defeating the Chifley government in 1949, in part over a Labor proposal to nationalise banks and following a crippling coal strike influenced by the Australian Communist Party. Menzies became the country's longest-serving prime minister and the Liberal party, in coalition with the rural based Country Party, won every federal election until 1972.

As in the United States in the early 1950s, allegations of communist influence in society saw tensions emerge in politics. Refugees from Soviet dominated Eastern Europe immigrated to Australia, while to Australia's north, Mao Zedong won the Chinese Civil War in 1949 and in June 1950, Communist North Korea invaded South Korea. The Menzies government responded to a United States led United Nations Security Council request for military aid for South Korea and diverted forces from occupied Japan to begin Australia's involvement in the Korean War. After fighting to a bitter standstill, the UN and North Korea signed a ceasefire agreement in July 1953. Australian forces had participated in such major battles as Kapyong and Maryang San. Seventeen thousand Australians had served and casualties amounted to more than 1,500, of whom 339 were killed.

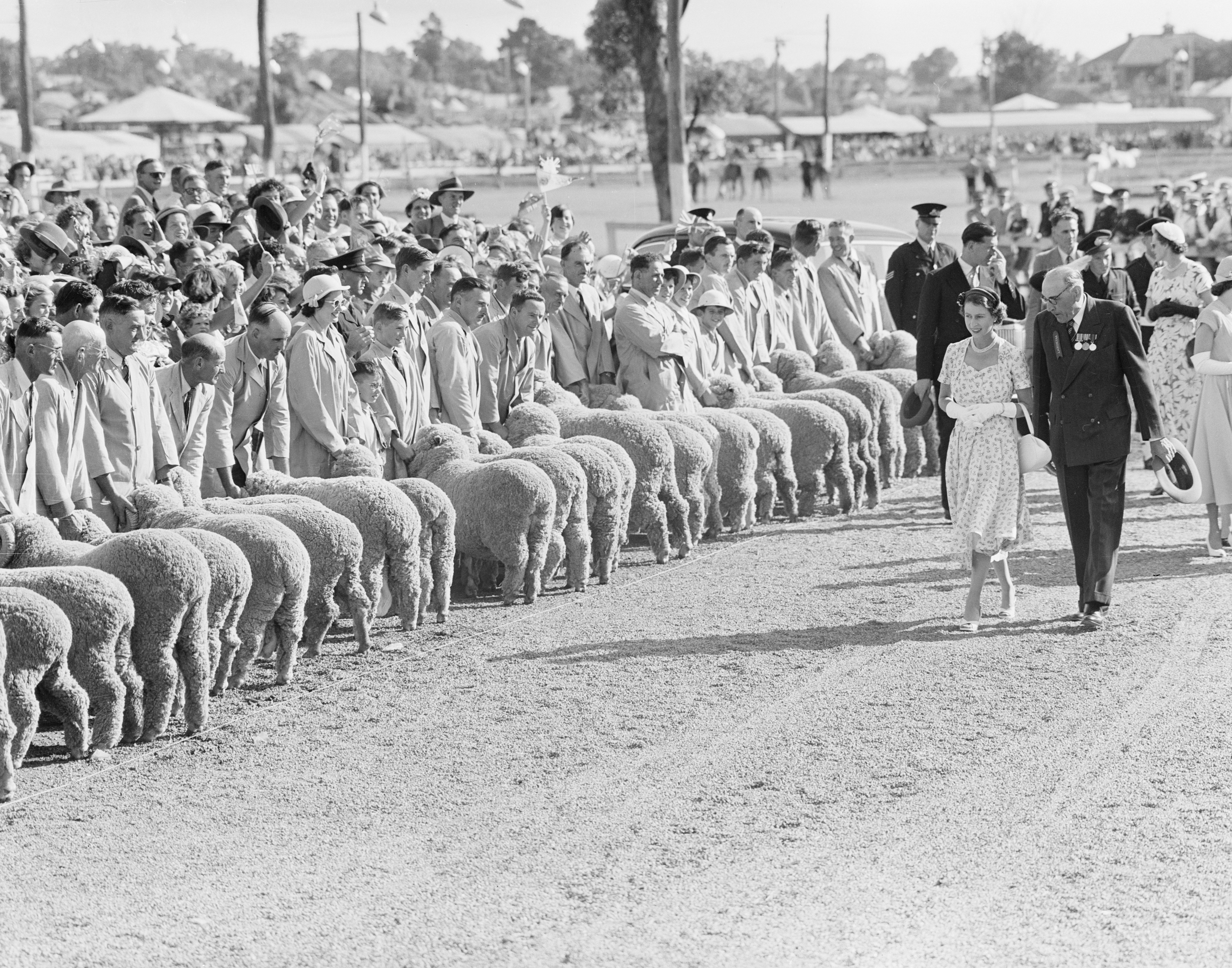
Elizabeth II inspecting sheep at Wagga Wagga on her 1954 Royal Tour. Huge crowds met the Royal party across Australia.

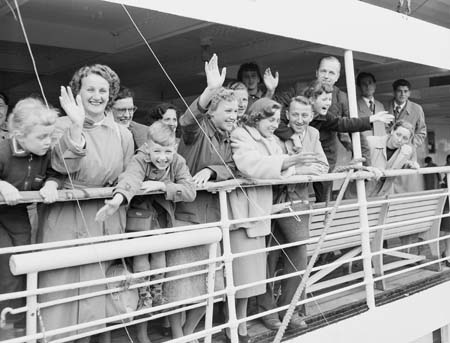
Postwar migrants arriving in Australia in 1954

During the course of the Korean War, the Menzies government attempted to ban the Communist Party of Australia, first by legislation in 1950 and later by referendum, in 1951. While both attempts were unsuccessful, further international events such as the defection of minor Soviet Embassy official Vladimir Petrov, added to a sense of impending threat that politically favoured Menzies’ Liberal-CP government, as the Labor Party pushed centralist economics and split over concerns about the influence of the Communist Party over the Trade Union movement, resulting in a bitter split in 1955 and the emergence of the breakaway Democratic Labor Party (DLP). The DLP remained an influential political force, often holding the balance of power in the Senate, until 1974; its preferences supported the Liberal and Country Party. The Labor party was led by H. V. Evatt after Chifley's death in 1951. Evatt retired in 1960, and Arthur Calwell succeeded him as leader, with a young Gough Whitlam as his deputy.

Menzies presided over a period of sustained economic boom and the beginnings of sweeping social change – with the arrivals of rock and roll music and television in the 1950s. In 1956, television in Australia began broadcasting, Melbourne hosted the Olympics and, for the first time, performing artist Barry Humphries performed the character of Edna Everage as a parody of a house-proud housewife of staid 1950s Melbourne suburbia (the character only later morphed into a critique of self-obsessed celebrity culture). It was the first of many of his satirical stage and screen creations based around quirky Australian characters.

In 1958, Australian country music singer Slim Dusty, who would become the musical embodiment of rural Australia, had Australia's first international music chart hit with his bush ballad "A Pub with No Beer", while rock and roller Johnny O'Keefe's Wild One became the first local recording to reach the national charts, peaking at #20. Before sleeping through the 1960s Australian cinema produced little of its own content in the 1950s, but British and Hollywood studios produced a string of successful epics from Australian literature, featuring home grown stars Chips Rafferty and Peter Finch.

Menzies remained a staunch supporter of links to the monarchy and British Commonwealth and formalised an alliance with the United States, but also launched post-war trade with Japan, beginning a growth of Australian exports of coal, iron ore and mineral resources that would steadily climb until Japan became Australia's largest trading partner.

In the early 1950s, the Menzies government saw Australia as part of a "triple alliance", in concert with both the US and traditional ally Britain. At first, "the Australian leadership opted for a consistently pro-British line in diplomacy", while at the same time looking for opportunities to involve the US in South East Asia. Thus, other than the Korean War, the government also committed military forces to the Malayan Emergency and hosted British nuclear tests after 1952. Australia was also the only Commonwealth country to offer support to the British during the Suez Crisis.

Menzies oversaw an effusive welcome to Queen Elizabeth II on the first visit to Australia by a reigning monarch, in 1954. However, as British influence declined in South East Asia, the US alliance came to have greater significance for Australian leaders and the Australian economy. British investment in Australia remained significant until the late 1970s, but trade with Britain declined through the 1950s and 1960s. In the late 1950s the Australian Army began to re-equip using US military equipment. In 1962, the US established a naval communications station at North West Cape, the first of several built over the next decade. Most significantly, in 1962, Australian Army advisors were sent to help train South Vietnamese forces, in a developing conflict the British had no part in.

The ANZUS security treaty, which had been signed in 1951, had its origins in Australia's and New Zealand's fears of a rearmed Japan, but found new impetus through anti-communism. Its obligations on the US, Australia and New Zealand are vague, but its influence on Australian foreign policy thinking, at times significant. The SEATO treaty, signed only three years later, clearly demonstrated Australia's position as a US ally in the emerging cold war. On 26 November 1967, Australia became the seventh nation to put a satellite into Earth orbit, launching WRESAT from Woomera.

When Menzies retired in January 1966, he was replaced as Liberal leader and prime minister by Harold Holt. The Holt government increased Australian commitment to the growing War in Vietnam; oversaw conversion to decimal currency and faced Britain's withdrawal from Asia by visiting and hosting many Asian leaders and by expanding ties to the United States, hosting the first visit to Australia by an American president, his friend Lyndon B. Johnson. Significantly, Holt's government introduced the Migration Act 1966, which effectively dismantled the vestigial mechanisms of the White Australia policy and increased access to non-European migrants, including refugees fleeing the Vietnam War. Holt also called the 1967 Referendum which removed the discriminatory clause in the Constitution of Australia which excluded Aboriginal Australians from being counted in the census – the referendum was one of the few to be overwhelmingly endorsed by the Australian electorate (over 90% voted 'yes').

Holt won the 1967 election with the largest parliamentary majority in 65 years, but Holt drowned while swimming at a surf beach in December 1967 and was replaced by John Gorton (1968–1971). The Gorton government began winding down Australia's commitment to Vietnam, increased funding for the arts, standardised rates of pay between the men and women and continued moving Australian trade closer to Asia. The Liberals suffered a decline in voter support at the 1969 election and internal party division saw Gorton replaced by William McMahon (1971–1972) and, facing a reinvigorated Australian Labor Party led by Gough Whitlam, the Liberals entered their final stretch in office of a record 23 straight years period.

== 1960s and 1970s: The "Australian New Wave" ==
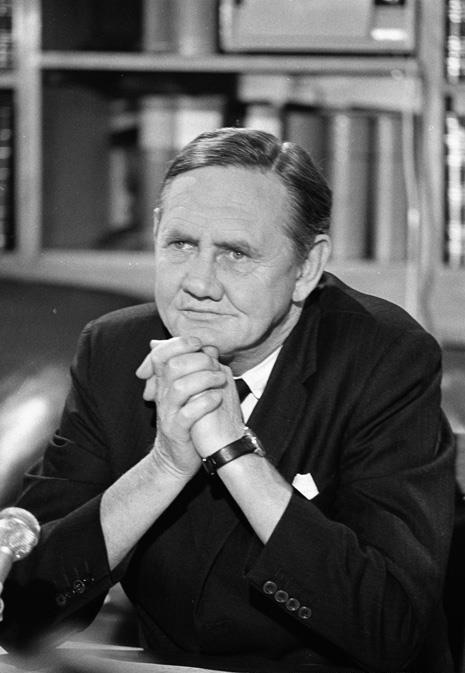
"Australian to the bootheels": Prime Minister John Gorton established government support for Australian cinema.

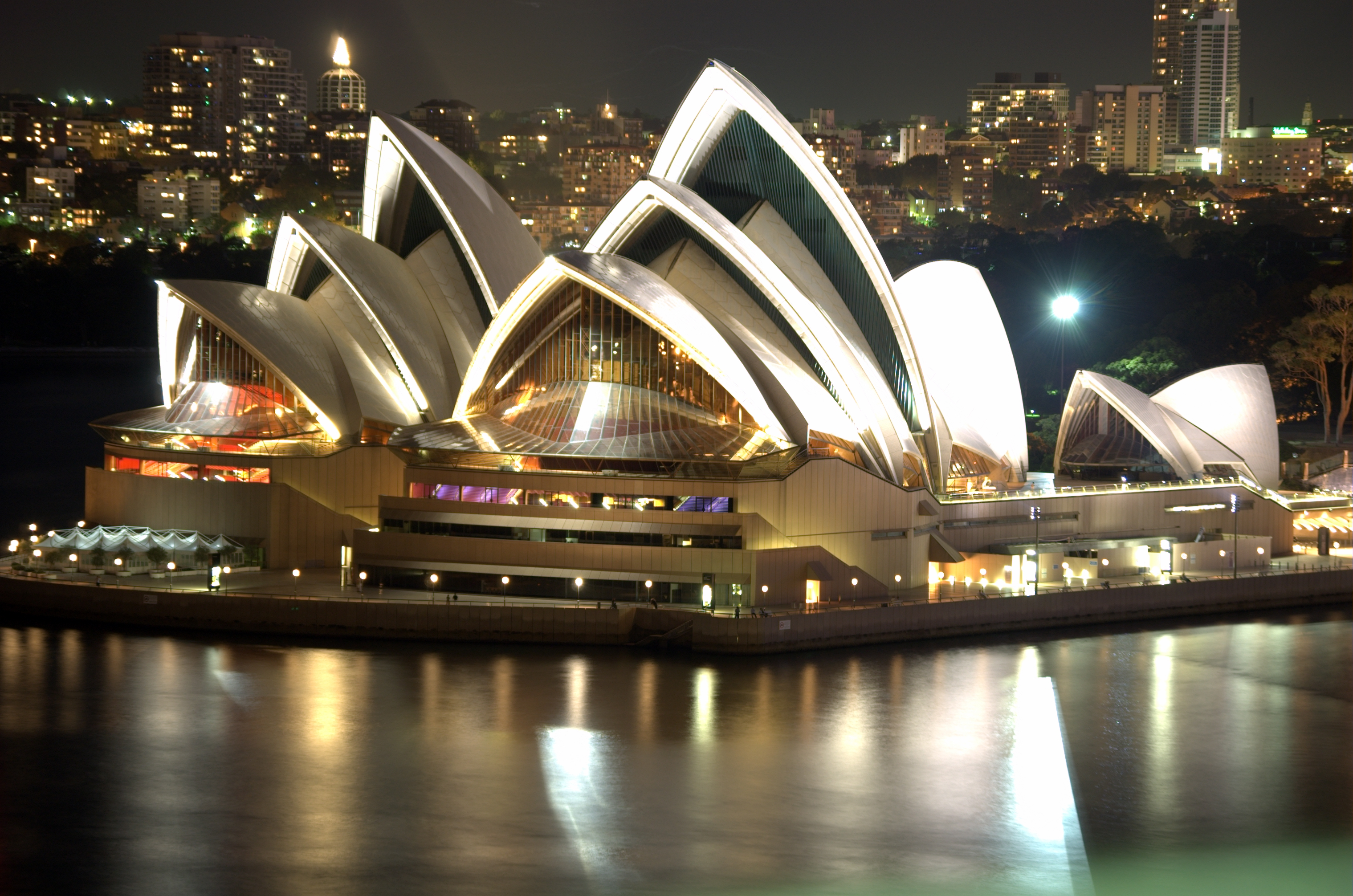
The Sydney Opera House was officially opened in 1973.

From the mid-1960s, evidence of a new and more independent sense of national pride and identity began to emerge in Australia. In the early 1960s, the National Trust of Australia began to be active in preserving Australia's natural, cultural and historic heritage. Australian TV, while always dependent on US and British imports, saw locally made dramas and comedies appear, and programs such as Homicide developed strong local loyalty while Skippy the Bush Kangaroo became a global phenomenon. Liberal prime minister John Gorton, a battle scarred former fighter pilot, described himself as "Australian to the bootheels" and the Gorton government established the Australian Council for the Arts, the Australian Film Development Corporation and the National Film and Television Training School.

The late 1960s and early 1970s are often associated with a flowering of Australian culture. Indigenous Australians achieved greater rights, immigration restrictions and censorship laws were swept aside, theatre and opera companies were established across the country, and Australian rock music blossomed. The 1971 South Africa rugby union tour of Australia was influential in raising awareness of Aboriginal injustice in Australia and also led Australia to become the first Western nation to cut sporting ties with South Africa. In a significant move against South Africa's apartheid regime, many Australians (including Wallabies) demonstrated against tours by the racially selected South African team. The Australian media tycoon Kerry Packer altered the traditionalist ethos of the game of cricket in the 1970s, inventing World Series Cricket from which have evolved many aspects of the various modern international forms of the game.

The iconic Sydney Opera House finally opened in 1973 after numerous delays. In the same year, Patrick White became the first Australian to win a Nobel Prize for Literature. Australian History had begun to appear on school curriculums by the 1970s and from the early 1970s, the Australian cinema began to produce the Australian New Wave of feature films based on uniquely Australian themes. Film funding began under the Gorton government, but it was the South Australian Film Corporation that took the lead in supporting filmmaking and among their great successes were quintessential Australian films Sunday Too Far Away (1974) Picnic at Hanging Rock (1975), Breaker Morant (1980) and Gallipoli (1981). The national funding body, the Australian Film Commission, was established in 1975.

Significant changes also occurred to Australia's censorship laws after the new Liberal Minister for Customs and Excise, Don Chipp, was appointed in 1969. In 1968, Barry Humphries and Nicholas Garland's cartoon book featuring the larrikin character Barry McKenzie was banned. Yet only a few years later, the book had been made as a film, partly with the support of government funding. Anne Pender suggests that the Barry McKenzie character both celebrated and parodied Australian nationalism. Historian Richard White also argues that "while many of the plays, novels and films produced in the 1970s were intensely critical of aspects of Australian life, they were absorbed by the ‘new nationalism’ and applauded for their Australianness."

== Australia and the Vietnam War ==
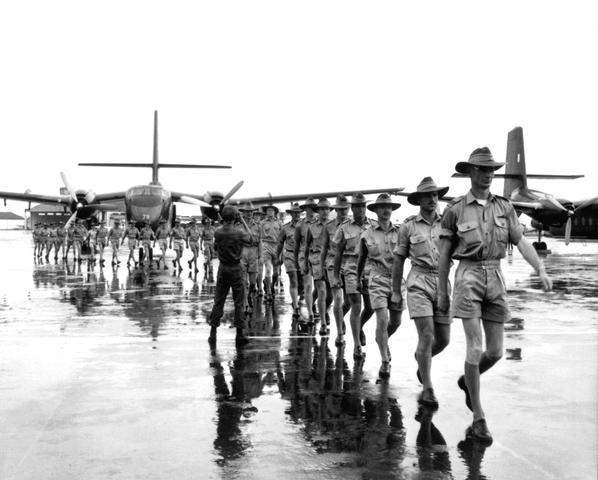
Personnel and aircraft of RAAF Transport Flight Vietnam arrive in South Vietnam in August 1964

The Menzies government despatched the first small contingent of Australian military training personnel to aid South Vietnam in 1962, so beginning Australia's decade long involvement in the Vietnam War. Ngo Dinh Diem, the leader of the government in South Vietnam, had requested security assistance from the US and its allies. The Australian government supported the commitment as part of global effort to stem the spread of communism in Europe and Asia.

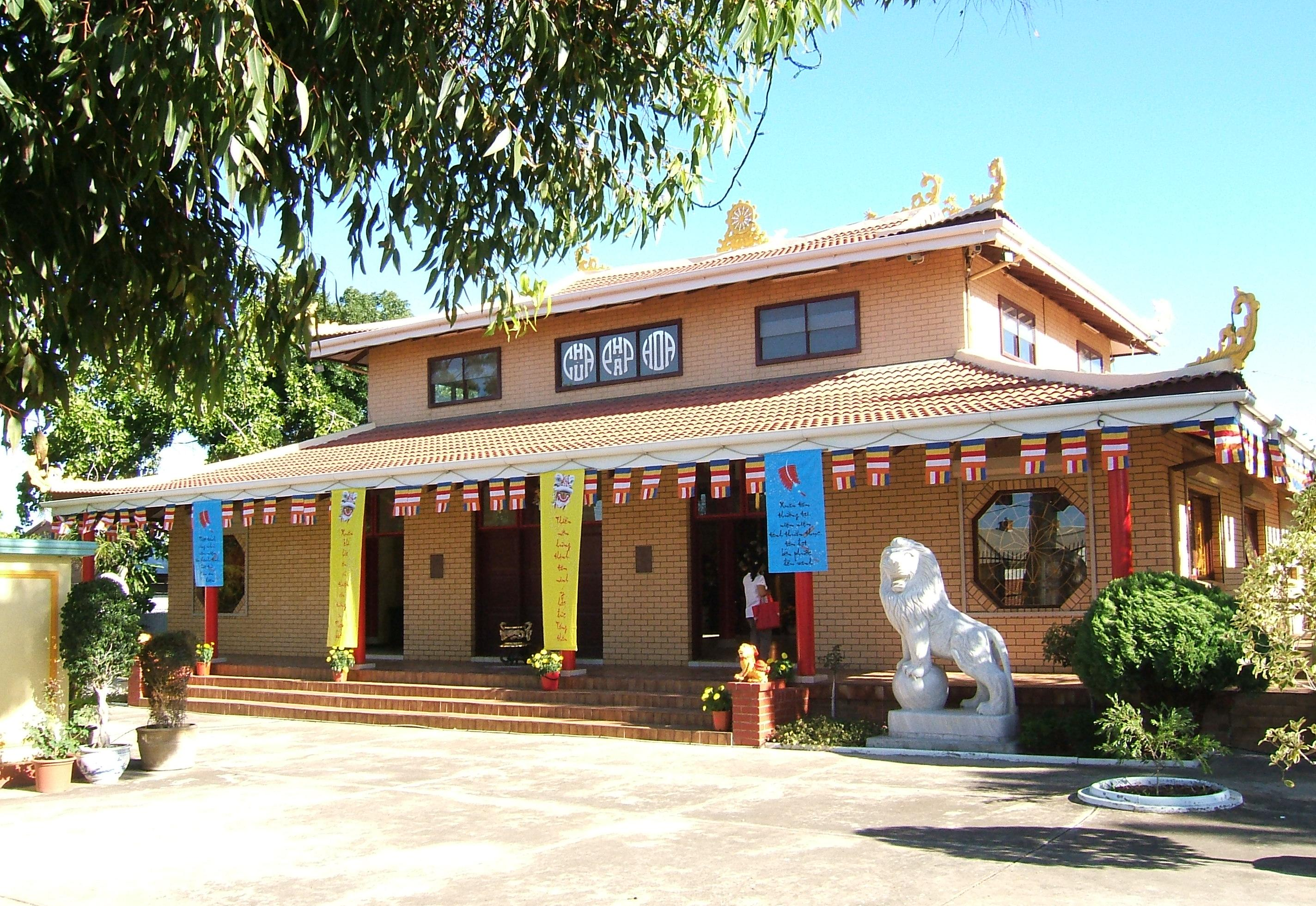
Pháp Hoa Temple, a Vietnamese Buddhist temple in Adelaide. Thousands of Vietnamese refugees were resettled in Australia following the communist victory in Vietnam.

Initially popular, Australia's participation in Vietnam, and particularly the use of conscription, later became politically contentious and saw massive protests, though they were for the most part peaceful. The United States launched a major escalation of the war in 1965 and the Holt government which succeeded Menzies, increased Australia's military commitment to the conflict. Holt won a massive majority in the 1967 Election. By 1969 however, anti-war protests were gathering momentum and opposition to conscription was growing, with more people believing the war could not be won. The Gorton government (returned with a reduced majority at the 1969 Election) ceased to replace Australian personnel from 1970. There were large Moratorium marches in 1970 and 1971 and Australia's troop commitment continued to wind down through 1971 with the last battalion leaving Nui Dat in November. The election of the Whitlam government in 1972 brought Australia's small remaining involvement in the war to an official close in June 1973 with the withdrawal of the last platoon guarding the Australian Embassy in Saigon. Australian forces were largely based at Nui Dat, Phước Tuy province, and participated in such notable battles as the Battle of Long Tan against the Viet Cong in 1966 and defending against the 1968 Tet Offensive. Almost 60,000 Australians had served in Vietnam and 521 had died as a result of the war. As the war became unpopular, protestors and conscienscious objectors became prominent and soldiers often met a hostile reception on their return home in the later stages of the conflict.

In early 1975 the communists launched a major offensive resulting in the fall of Saigon on 30 April. The Royal Australian Air Force assisted in final humanitarian evacuations. In the aftermath of the communist victory, Australia assisted in re-settlement of Vietnamese refugees, with thousands making their way to Australia through the 1970s and 1980s.

== Papua New Guinea and Nauru independence ==
Australia had administered Papua New Guinea and Nauru for much of the 20th century. British New Guinea (Papua) had passed to Australia in 1906. German New Guinea was captured by Australia during the First World War, becoming a League of Nations mandate after the war. Following the bitter New Guinea campaign of World War II which saw occupation of half the island by the Empire of Japan, the Territory of Papua and New Guinea was established by an administrative union between the Australian-administered Territory of Papua and Territory of New Guinea in 1949. Under Liberal Minister for External Territories Andrew Peacock, Papua and New Guinea adopted self-government in 1972 and on 15 September 1975, during the term of the Whitlam government in Australia, the Territory became the independent nation of Papua New Guinea.

Australia had captured the island of Nauru from the German Empire in 1914. After Japanese occupation during World War II, it became a UN Trust Territory under Australia and remained so until achieving independence in 1968. In 1989 Nauru sued Australia in the International Court of Justice in The Hague for damages caused by mining. Australia settled the case out of court agreeing to a lump sum settlement of A$107 million and an annual stipend of the equivalent of A$2.5 million toward environmental rehabilitation.

== Whitlam, Fraser and the dismissal ==
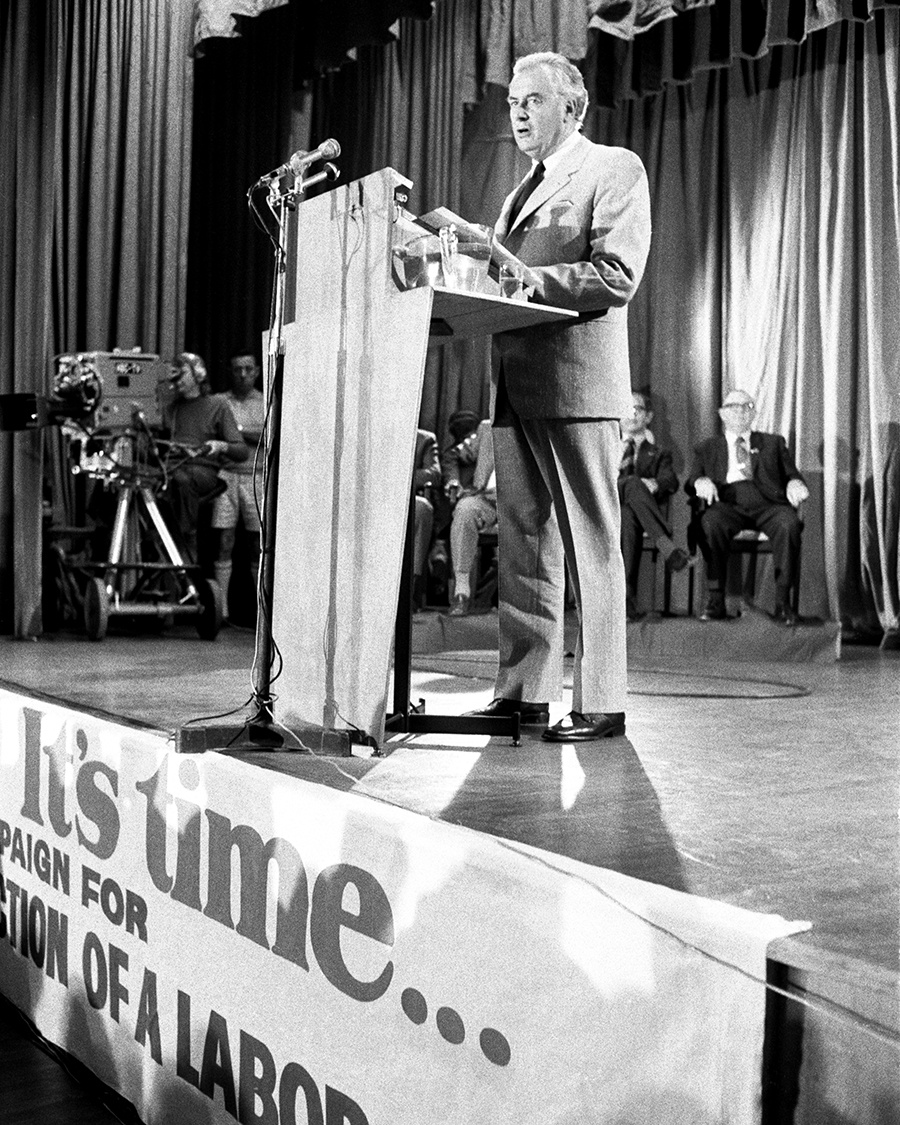
Gough Whitlam during the 1972 federal election.

Elected in December 1972 after 23 years in opposition, Labor won office under Gough Whitlam and introduced a significant program of social change and reform. Whitlam said before the election: "our program has three great aims. They are – to promote equality; to involve the people of Australia in … decision making…; and to liberate the talents and uplift the horizons of the Australian people."

Whitlam's actions were immediate and dramatic. Within a few weeks the last military advisors in Vietnam were recalled, and national service ended. The People's Republic of China was recognised (Whitlam had visited China while Opposition Leader in 1971) and the embassy in Taiwan closed. Over the next few years, university fees were abolished and a national health care scheme established. Significant changes were made to school funding, something Whitlam regarded as "the most enduring single achievement" of his government. Divorce and family law was liberalised.

Whitlam's radical and imperious style eventually alienated many voters, and some of the state governments were openly hostile to his government. As it did not control the senate, much of its legislation was rejected or amended. The Queensland Country Party government of Joh Bjelke-Petersen had particularly bad relations with the Federal government. Even after it was re-elected at elections in May 1974, the Senate remained an obstacle to its political agenda. At the only joint sitting of parliament, in August 1974, six keys pieces of legislation wering passed.

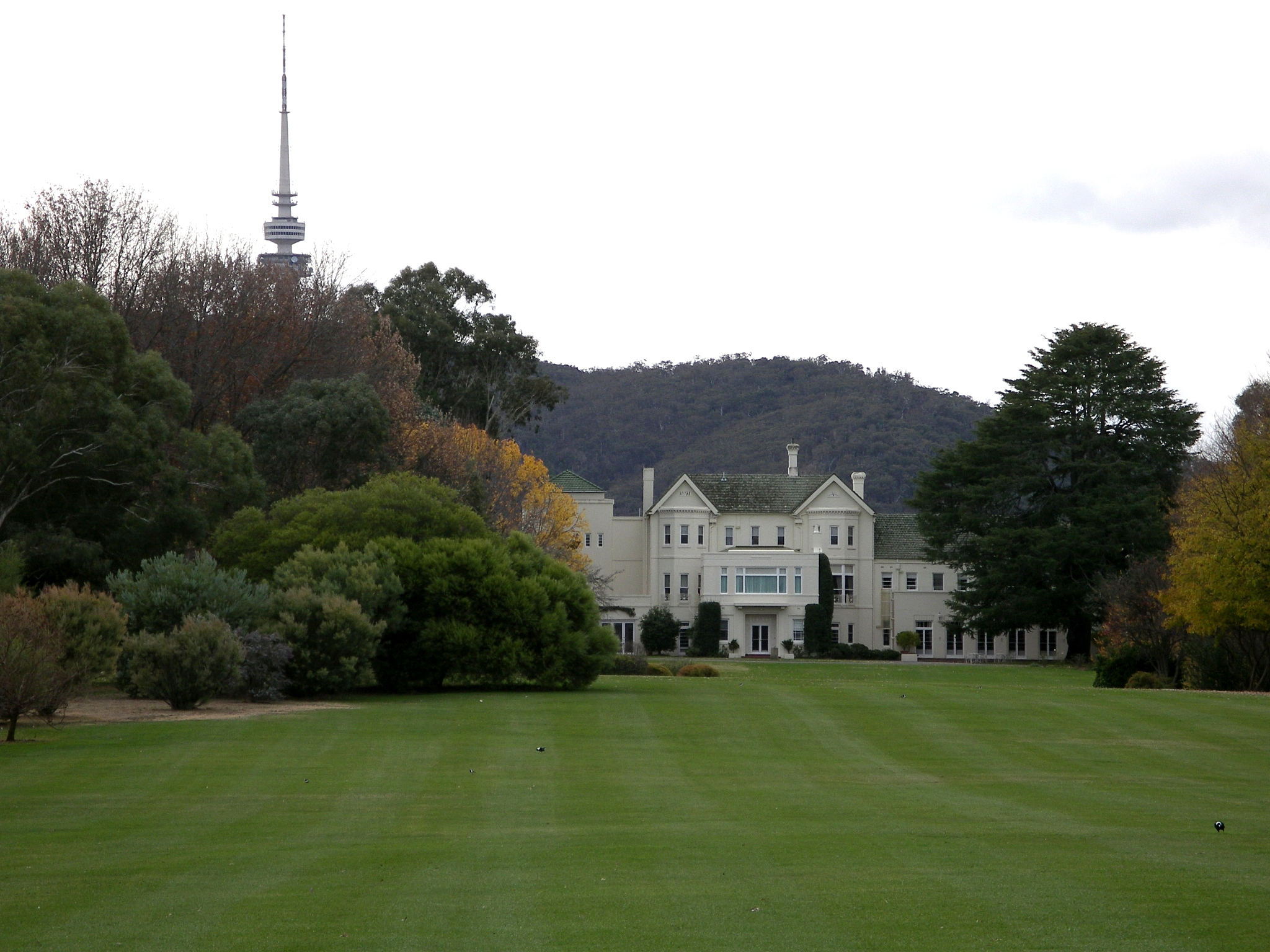
Government House, Canberra, also known as "Yarralumla". It was here that Sir John Kerr dismissed Gough Whitlam as Prime Minister of Australia on 11 November 1975 — the culmination of the 1975 Australian constitutional crisis.

In 1974, Whitlam selected John Kerr, a former member of the Labor Party and presiding Chief Justice of New South Wales to serve as Governor-General. The Whitlam government was re-elected with a decreased majority in the lower house in the 1974 Election. In 1974–75 the government thought about borrowing US$4 billion in foreign loans. Minister Rex Connor conducted secret discussions with a loan broker from Pakistan, and the Treasurer, Jim Cairns, misled parliament over the issue. Arguing the government was incompetent following the Loans affair, the opposition Liberal-Country Party Coalition delayed passage of the government's money bills in the Senate, until the government would promise a new election. Whitlam refused, Malcolm Fraser, leader of the Opposition insisted. The deadlock came to an end when the Whitlam government was dismissed by the Governor-General, John Kerr on 11 November 1975 and Fraser was installed as caretaker prime minister, pending an election. The "reserve powers" granted to the Governor General by the Constitution of Australia, had allowed an elected government to be dismissed without warning by a representative of the Monarch.

At elections held in late 1975, Malcolm Fraser and the Coalition were elected in a landslide victory.

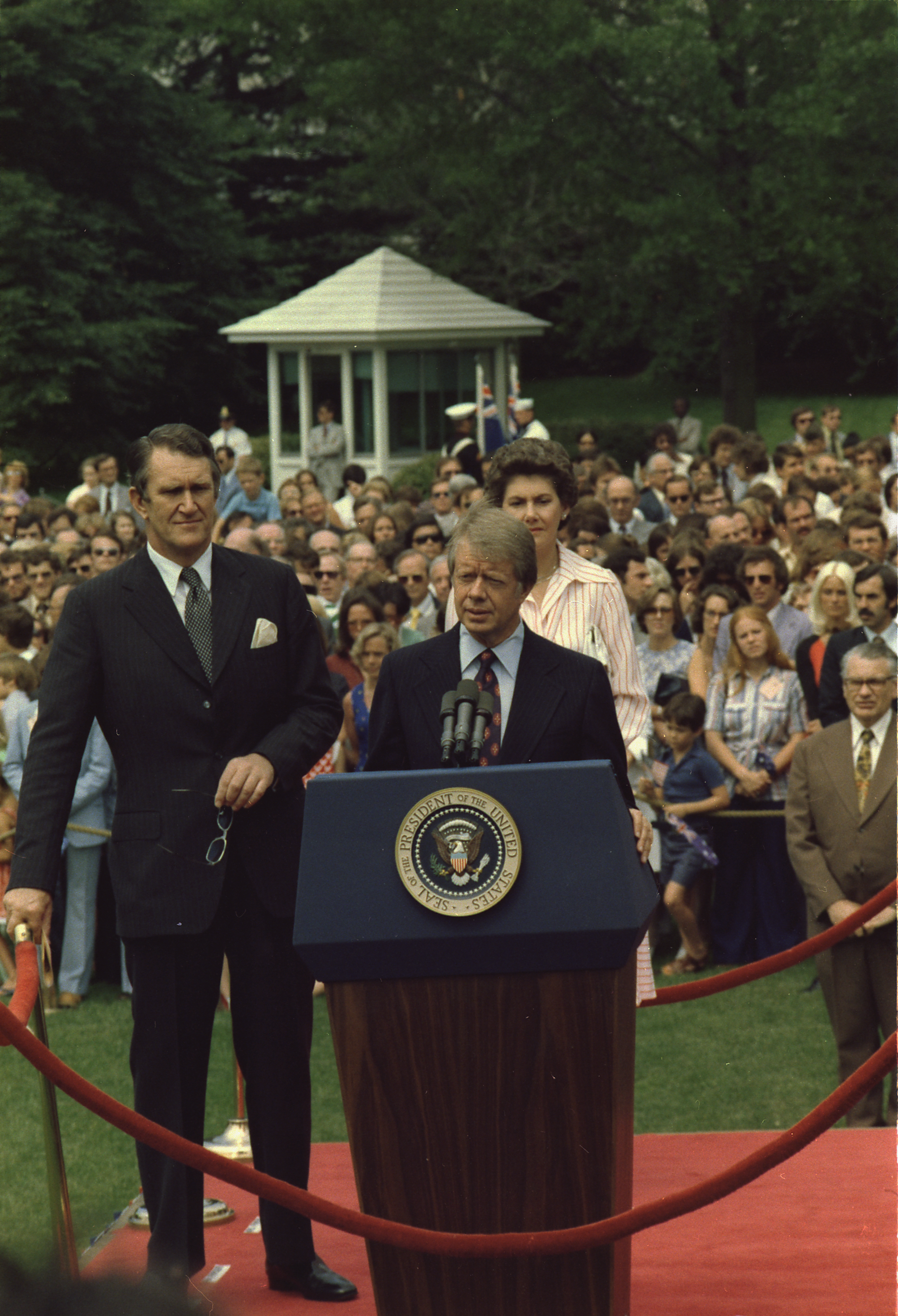
Malcolm Fraser and U.S. president Jimmy Carter (1977)

The Fraser government won two subsequent elections. Fraser maintained some of the social reforms of the Whitlam era, while seeking increased fiscal restraint. His government included the first Aboriginal federal parliamentarian, Neville Bonner, and in 1976, Parliament passed the Aboriginal Land Rights Act 1976, which, while limited to the Northern Territory, affirmed "inalienable" freehold title to some traditional lands. Fraser established the multicultural broadcaster SBS, welcomed Vietnamese boat people refugees, opposed minority white rule in Apartheid South Africa and Rhodesia and opposed Soviet expansionism. A significant program of economic reform however was not pursued and, by 1983, the Australian economy was in recession, amidst the effects of a severe drought. Fraser had promoted "states’ rights" and his government refused to use Commonwealth powers to stop the construction of the Franklin Dam in Tasmania in 1982. A Liberal minister, Don Chipp had split off from the party to form a new social liberal party, the Australian Democrats in 1977 and the Franklin Dam proposal contributed to the emergence of an influential Environmental movement in Australia, with branches including the Australian Greens, a political party which later emerged from Tasmania to pursue environmentalism as well as left-wing social and economic policies.

== 1980s and 1990s ==
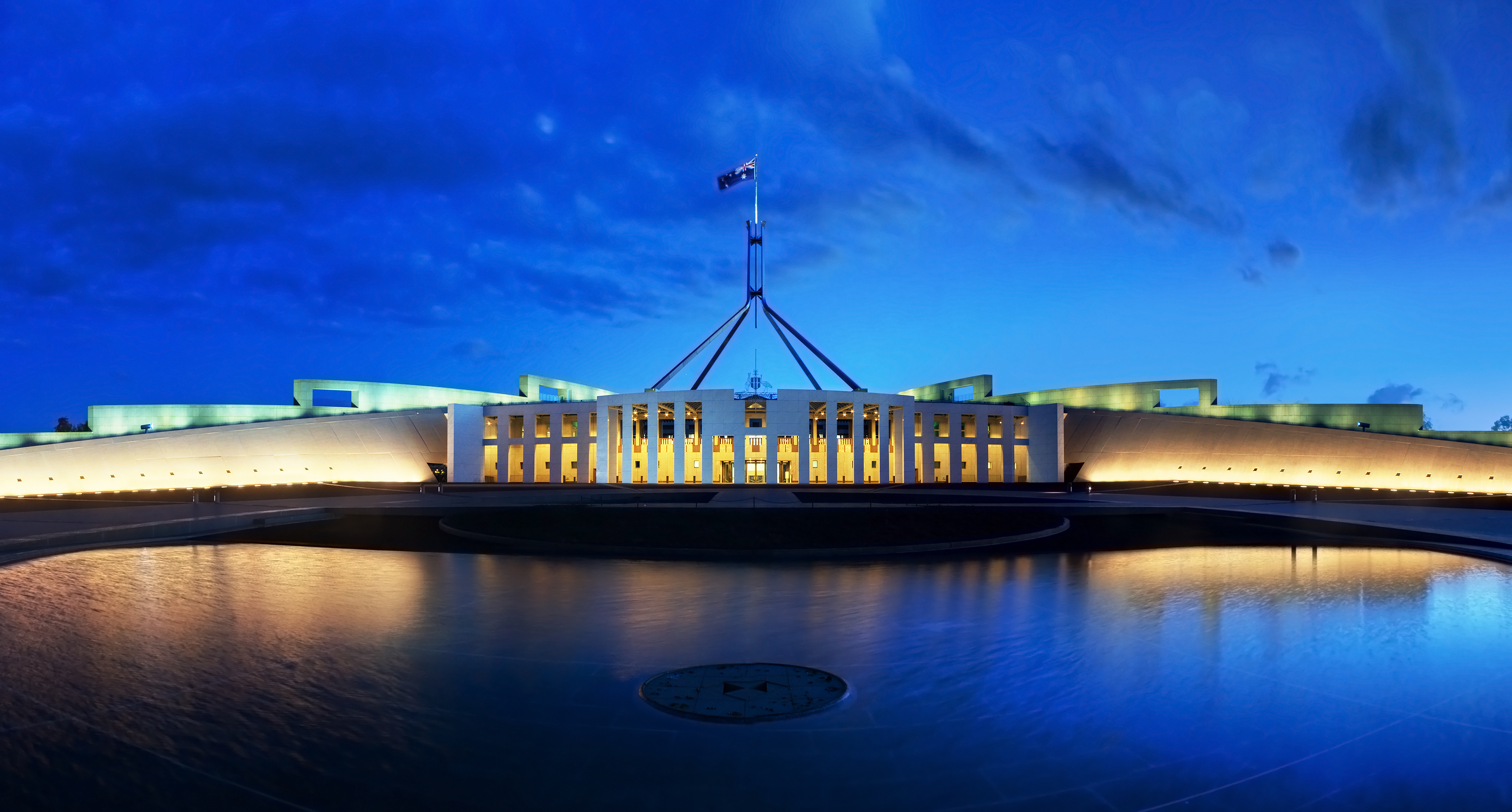
The new Parliament House in Canberra was opened in 1988.

Bob Hawke, a less polarising Labor leader than Whitlam, defeated Fraser at the 1983 Election. The new government stopped the Franklin Dam project via the High Court of Australia. The 1980s saw severe concerns about Australia's future economic health take hold, with severe current account deficits and high unemployment at times. Hawke, together with treasurer Paul Keating undertook micro-economic and industrial relations reform designed to increase efficiency and competitiveness. After the initial failure of the Whitlam model and partial dismantling under Fraser, Hawke re-established a new, universal system of health insurance called Medicare. Hawke and Keating abandoned traditional Labor support for tariffs to protect industry and jobs. They moved to deregulate Australia's financial system and ‘floated’ the Australian dollar. An agreement was reached with trade unions to moderate wage demands and accept more flexible working condition arrangements by accepting tax cuts in return. Ultimately, many of the reforms, continued by successive governments, appear to have been successful in pushing the economy along.

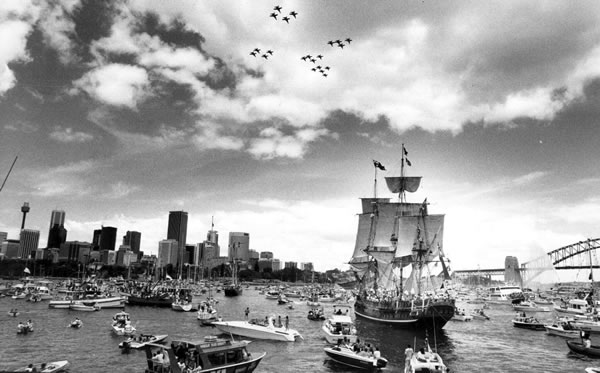
Tall ship First Fleet re-enactment on Sydney Harbour, Australia Day, 1988. The Australian Bicentenary was marked with much ceremony across Australia.

The Australian Bicentenary was celebrated in 1988 along with the opening of a new Parliament House in Canberra. The following year the Australian Capital Territory achieved self-government and Jervis Bay became a separate territory administered by the Minister for Territories.

A supporter of the US alliance, Hawke committed Australian naval forces to the Gulf War, following the 1990 invasion of Kuwait by Iraq. After four successful elections, but amid a deteriorating Australian economy and rising unemployment, the intense rivalry between Hawke and Keating led the Labor Party to replace Hawke as leader and Paul Keating became prime minister in 1991.

Unemployment reached 11.4% in 1992 – the highest since the Great Depression. The Liberal-National Opposition had proposed an ambitious plan of economic reform to take to the 1993 Election, including the introduction of a goods and services tax. Keating shuffled treasurers and campaigned strongly against the tax and won the 1993 Election. During his time in office, Keating emphasised links to the Asia Pacific region, co-operating closely with the president of Indonesia, Suharto, and campaigned to increase the role of APEC as a major forum for economic co-operation. Keating was active in indigenous affairs and the High Court of Australia's historic Mabo decision in 1992 required a legislative response to recognition of Indigenous title to land, culminating in the Native Title Act 1993 and the Land Fund Act 1994. In 1993, Keating established a Republic Advisory Committee, to examine options for Australia becoming a republic. With foreign debt, interest rates and unemployment still high, and after a series of ministerial resignations, Keating lost the 1996 Election to the Liberals' John Howard.

=== Full sovereignty from the United Kingdom ===
The Australia Act 1986 led to the severing of nearly all constitutional ties between Australia and the UK. This was achieved by the passing of the which removed the right of the British Parliament to make laws for Australia and ended any British role in the government of the Australian States. It also removed the right of appeal from Australian courts to the British Privy Council in London. Most important, the Act transferred into Australian hands full control of all Australia's constitutional documents.

== Indigenous Australia ==
Campaigns for indigenous rights in Australia have a long history. In the modern era, 1938 was an important year. With the participation of leading indigenous activists like Douglas Nicholls, the Australian Aborigines Advancement League organised a protest "Day of Mourning" to mark the 150th anniversary of the arrival of the First Fleet of British in Australia and launched its campaign for full citizenship rights for all Aborigines. In the 1940s, the conditions of life for Aborigines could be very poor. A permit system restricted movement and work opportunities for many Aboriginal people.

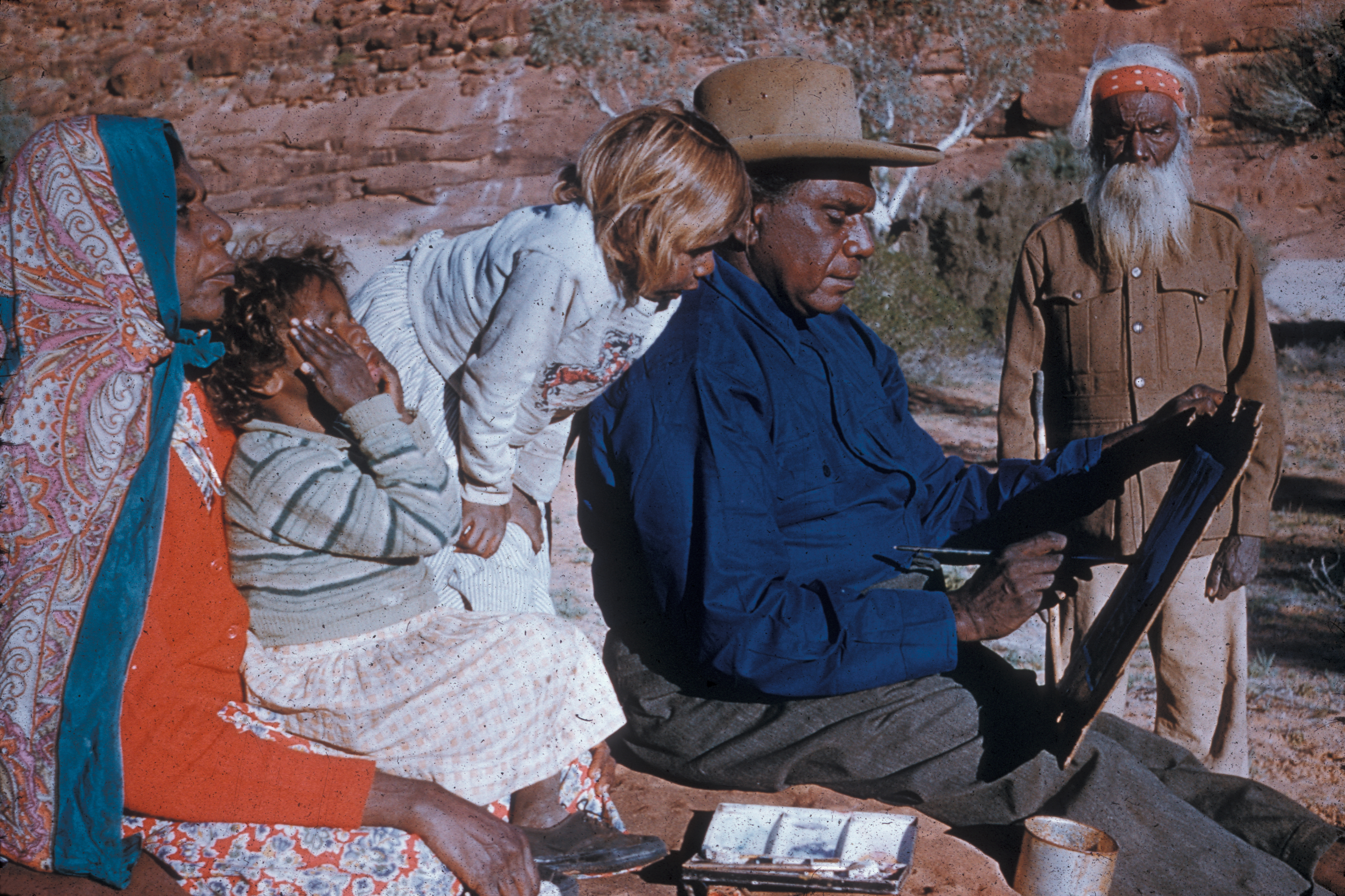
Albert Namatjira painting in Alice Springs, c.1957

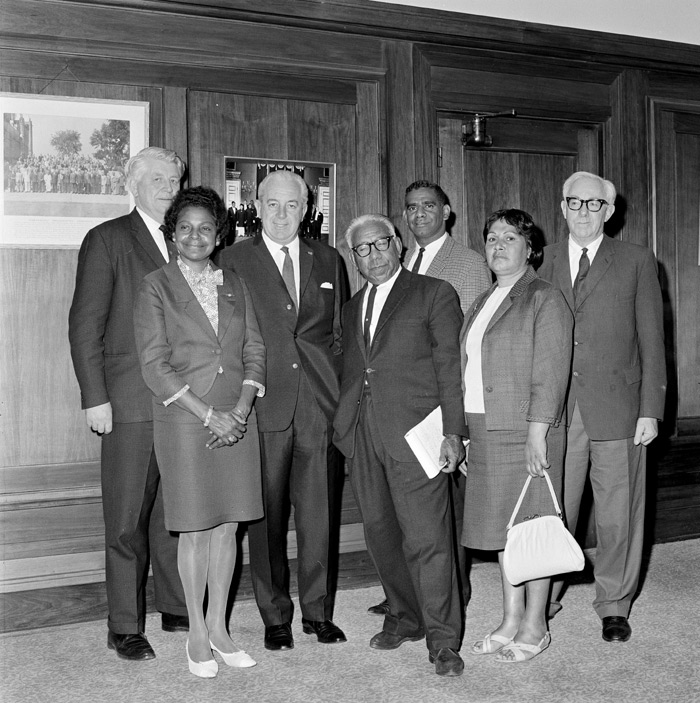
Gordon Bryant (left), Prime Minister Harold Holt (third from left) and Bill Wentworth (right) meeting with FCAATSI representatives – from left to right, Faith Bandler, Douglas Nicholls, Burnum Burnum and Winnie Branson.

During the 1950s and 60s, the government pursued a policy of "assimilation" which sought to achieve full citizenship rights for Aborigines but also wanted them to adopt the mode of life of other Australians (which very often was assumed to require suppression of cultural identity). " From the 1950s onwards, Australians began to rethink their attitudes towards racial issues, mirroring developments in other western nations. Momentum grew within the Aboriginal rights movement, building on the legacy of earlier generations of activism, and the historical White Australia Policy fell out of public favour.

With uneven voting rights for Aboriginals based on states laws, the newly elected Menzies Government legislated in 1949 to ensure that all Indigenous Australians who'd served in the military received the right to vote. The Menzies Government's historic 1962 Commonwealth Electorate Act then removed the power of states to deny Aboriginals a vote in Federal Elections, and Queensland and Western Australia removed their prohibitions on state voting rights soon after.

Menzies' successor Harold Holt called the landmark 1967 referendum, which received more than 90% approval from the electorate, and ended the discriminatory practice of not automatically counting Indigenous Australians in the electoral roll census, and of allowing the states, rather than the Federal Parliament, to legislate specifically for Indigenous Australians. Contrary to frequently repeated mythology, this referendum did not cover citizenship on Aboriginal people, nor did it give them the vote: they already had both. However, transferring this power away from the State parliaments did bring an end to the system of Aboriginal reserve which existed in each state, which allowed Indigenous people to move more freely, and exercise many of their citizenship rights for the first time. From the late 1960s a movement for Indigenous land rights also developed.

After the death of Holt, his successor John Gorton established the role of Minister for Aboriginal Affairs, and outlined a program for "advancement" of Aboriginal people by means of "the assimilation of Aboriginal Australians as fully effective members of a single Australian society":

"In other words, without destroying Aboriginal culture, we want to help our Aboriginals to become an integral part of the rest of the Australian people, and we want the Aboriginals themselves to have a voice in the pace at which this process occurs."

— Prime Minister John Gorton, 12 July 1968

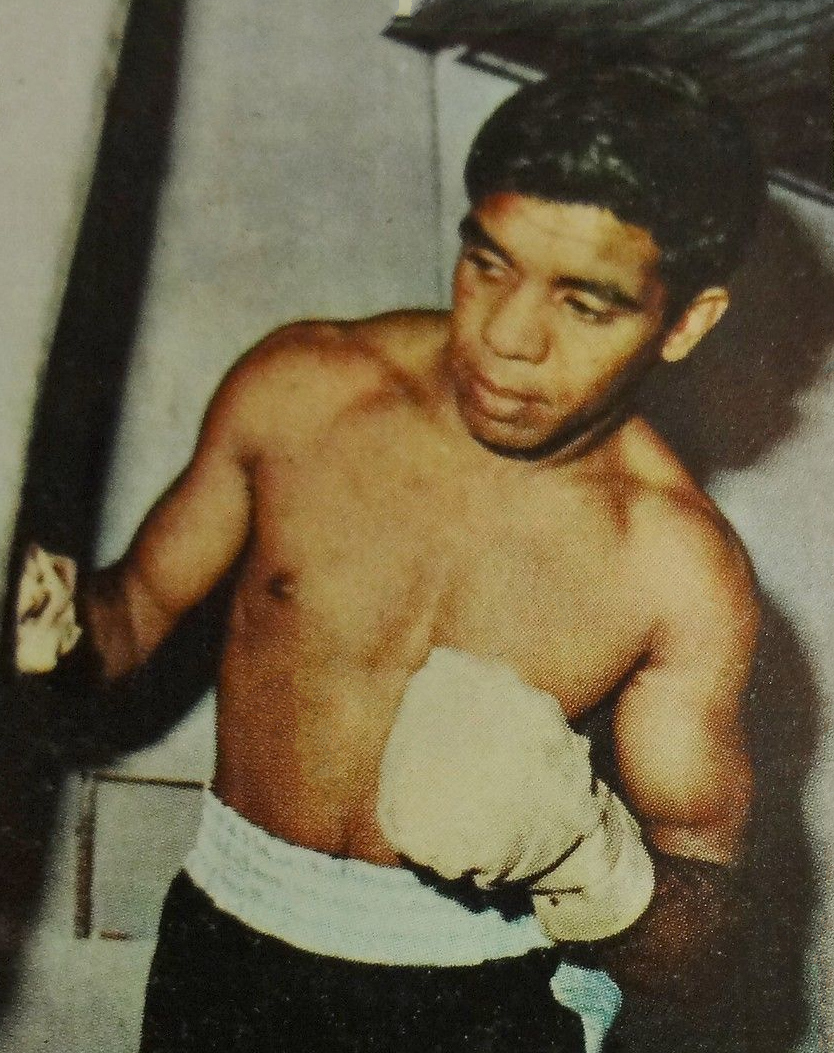
World champion boxer Lionel Rose in 1968

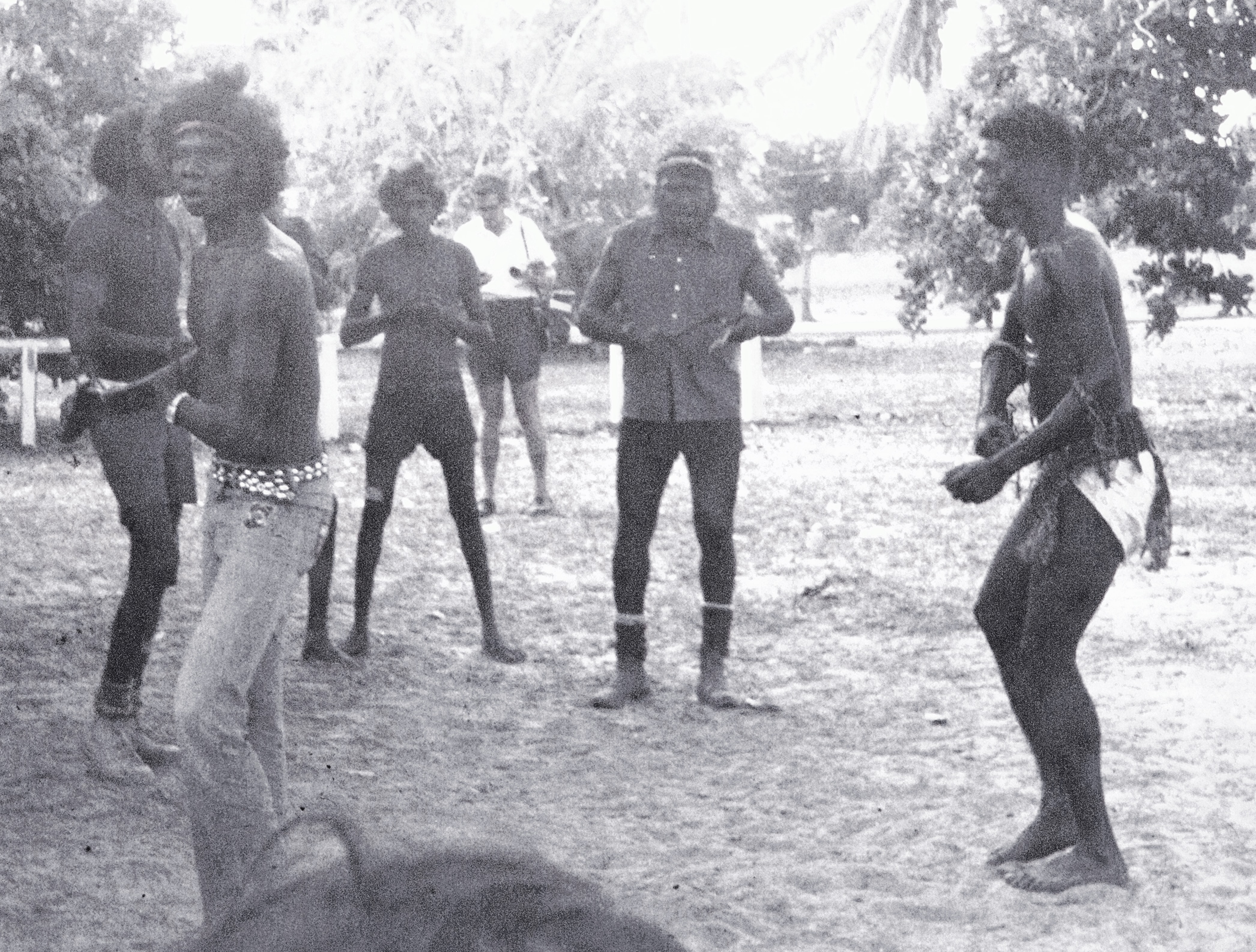
World renowned actor David Gulpilil (left) at dancing practice in Lajamanu in 1972

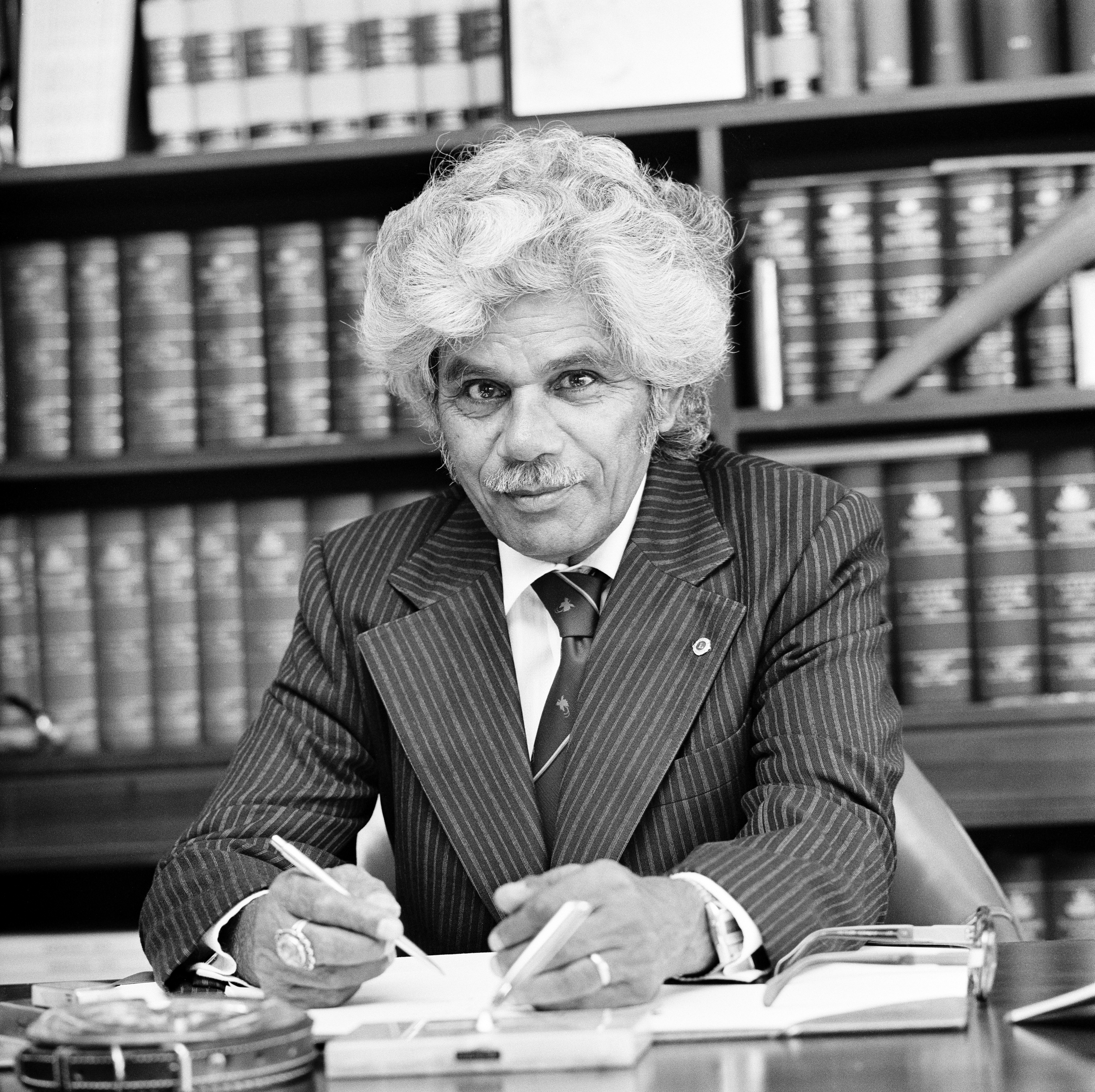
Liberal Senator Neville Bonner pictured in 1979.

Gorton considered that the "primary aim" of government policy should be to "make Aboriginals self supporting", and to end dependence on welfare and charity. The Government introduced the Aboriginal Study Grants Scheme (ABSTUDY) in 1969, in response to low participation of Indigenous Australians in higher education, and the Aboriginal Secondary Grants Scheme (ABSEG) in 1970 to boost participation in secondary schooling.

Menzies had established the Australian Institute of Aboriginal Studies in 1964 to help study and preserve traditional Aboriginal language, art and culture. The period also saw a flowering of recognition for Aboriginal artists, sportspeople and performers, including the breakthrough fame of the landscape painter Albert Namatjira in the 1950s, singer Jimmy Little and world champion boxer Lionel Rose in the 1960s, and tennis player Evonne Goolagong Cawley and acting great David Gulpilil from the 1970s.

Various groups and individuals were also active on the political front in the pursuit of equality and social justice from the 1960s. In the mid-1960s, one of the earliest Aboriginal graduates from the University of Sydney, Charles Perkins, helped organise freedom rides into parts of Australia to expose discrimination and inequality. In 1966, the Gurindji people of Wave Hill station (owned by the Vestey Group) commenced strike action led by Vincent Lingiari in a quest for equal pay and recognition of land rights.

Indigenous Australians began to take up representation in Australian parliaments during the 1970s. In 1971 Neville Bonner of the Liberal Party was appointed by the Queensland Parliament to replace a retiring senator, becoming the first Federal parliamentarian to identify as Aboriginal. Bonner was returned as a senator at the 1972 election and remained until 1983. Hyacinth Tungutalum of the Country Liberal Party in the Northern Territory and Eric Deeral of the National Party of Queensland, became the first Indigenous people elected to territory and state legislatures in 1974. In 1976, Sir Douglas Nicholls was appointed Governor of South Australia, becoming the first Aborigine to hold vice-regal office in Australia. Aden Ridgeway of the Australian Democrats served as a senator during the 1990s, but No indigenous person was elected to the House of Representatives, until West Australian Liberal Ken Wyatt, in August 2010.

In 1984, a group of Pintupi people who were living a traditional hunter-gatherer desert-dwelling life were tracked down in the Gibson Desert in Western Australia and brought in to a settlement. They are believed to be the last uncontacted tribe in Australia. In 1985, the Hawke government returned ownership of Uluru (formerly known as Ayers Rock) to the local Pitjantjatjara Aboriginal people.

In 1992, the High Court of Australia handed down its decision in the Mabo Case, declaring the previous legal concept of terra nullius to be invalid. That same year, Prime Minister Paul Keating said in his Redfern Park Speech that European settlers were responsible for the difficulties Australian Aboriginal communities continued to face: ‘We committed the murders. We took the children from their mothers. We practiced discrimination and exclusion. It was our ignorance and our prejudice’. In 1999 Parliament passed a Motion of Reconciliation drafted by Prime Minister John Howard and Aboriginal Senator Aden Ridgeway naming mistreatment of Indigenous Australians as the most "blemished chapter in our national history".

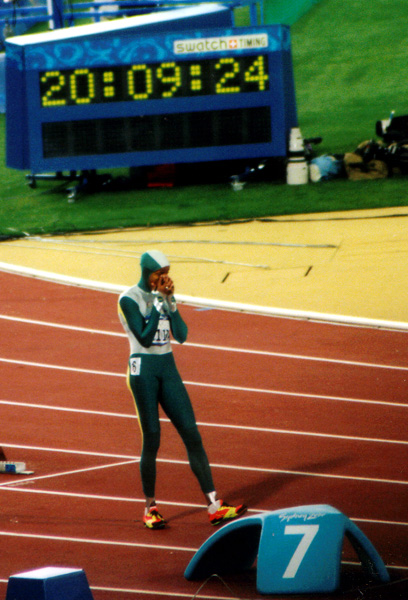
Cathy Freeman preparing to race in the Olympic 400m final at the Sydney Olympics, 2000.

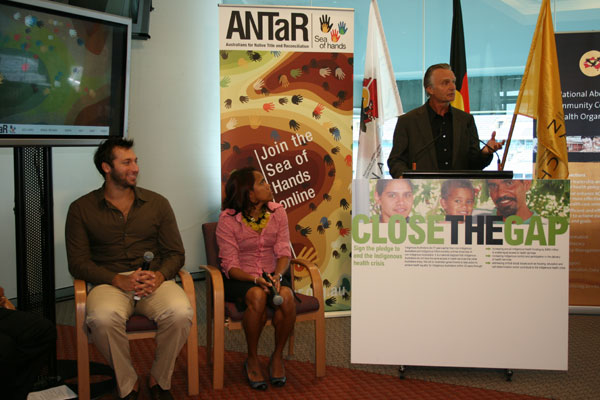
From left: Ian Thorpe, Cathy Freeman and Jeff McMullen were among some of the speakers at the Close the Gap launch in 2007. The campaign aims to achieve health equality between indigenous and non-indigenous Australia.

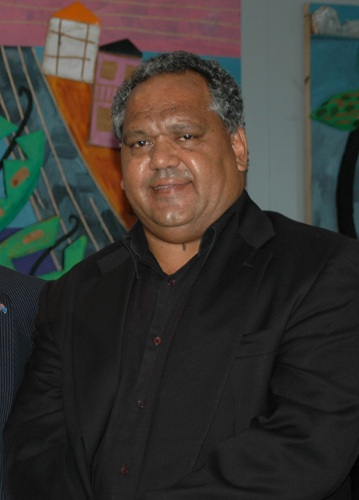
Noel Pearson is an Aboriginal lawyer, rights activist and essayist.

A great many indigenous Australians have been prominent in sport and the arts. Several styles of Aboriginal art have developed in modern times, including the watercolour paintings of Albert Namatjira's Hermannsburg School, and the acrylic Papunya Tula "dot art" movement. The Western Desert Art Movement became a globally renowned 20th-century art movement. Oodgeroo Noonuccal (1920–1995) was a famous Aboriginal poet, writer and rights activist credited with publishing the first Aboriginal book of verse: We Are Going (1964). Sally Morgan's novel My Place was considered a breakthrough memoir in terms of bringing indigenous stories to wider notice. Leading Aboriginal intellectuals Marcia Langton (First Australians, 2008) and Noel Pearson ("Up From the Mission", 2009) are active contemporary contributors to Australian literature. 1955's Jedda, was the first Australian feature film to star Aboriginal actors in lead roles and the first to be entered at the Cannes Film Festival. 1976's The Chant of Jimmie Blacksmith directed by Fred Schepisi was an award-winning historical drama from a book by Thomas Keneally about the tragic story of an Aboriginal Bushranger. The canon of films related to Indigenous Australians also increased over the period of the 1990s and early 21st century. In 2006, Rolf de Heer's Ten Canoes became the first major feature film to be shot in an indigenous language and the film was recognised at Cannes and elsewhere. In sport Evonne Goolagong Cawley became the world number-one ranked tennis player in 1971 and won 14 Grand Slam titles during her career. In 1973 Arthur Beetson became the first Indigenous Australian to captain his country in any sport when he first led the Australian National rugby league team, the Kangaroos. In 1982, Mark Ella became captain of the Australia national rugby union team. Olympic gold medalist Cathy Freeman lit the Olympic flame at the 2000 Summer Olympics opening ceremony in Sydney.

In the early 21st century, much of indigenous Australia continued to suffer lower standards of health and education than non-indigenous Australia. In 2007, the Close the Gap campaign was launched by Olympic champions Cathy Freeman and Ian Thorpe with the aim of achieving Indigenous health equality within 25 years. In 2007, Prime Minister John Howard and Indigenous Affairs Minister Mal Brough launched the Northern Territory National Emergency Response. In response to the Little Children are Sacred Report into allegations of child abuse among indigenous communities in the Territory, the government banned alcohol in prescribed communities in the Northern Territory; quarantined a percentage of welfare payments for essential goods purchasing; despatched additional police and medical personnel to the region; and suspended the permit system for access to indigenous communities.

During much of the twentieth century, Australian governments had removed many "mixed race" aboriginal children from their families. This practice did great damage to the Aboriginal people, culturally and emotionally, giving rise to the term stolen generations to describe these families. Since the publication in 1997 of a federal government report, Bringing Them Home all state governments have followed the recommendation of the report in issuing formal apologies for their past practices to the Aboriginal people, as have many local governments. The Howard government refused to make such an apology on behalf of the federal government, despite pleas from the Aboriginal people and from many sections of the wider community, saying that it implied intergenerational guilt on modern non-indigenous Australia. However, the new government under Kevin Rudd led a formal bi-partisan apology on 13 February 2008.

== Republicanism ==
In the early 21st century, Australia remains a constitutional monarchy under the Constitution of Australia adopted in 1901, with the duties of the monarch performed by a Governor-General selected by the Australian Government. Australian republicanism which had been a feature of the 1890s faded away during the First World War. Support for the Monarchy of Australia peaked during the Menzies years with the wildly successful 1954 tour by Queen Elizabeth II. Prince Charles attended school in Australia during the 1960s. The issue of a republic did not arise again until the 1970s. In the 1990s it was brought to the forefront of national debate by Prime Minister Paul Keating, who promised in 1993 to introduce an "Australian federal republic" by the centenary of Federation in 2001.

The Howard government called a Constitutional Convention to examine the issue in 1998. Delegates included appointees and elected representatives representing republicans, monarchists and neutral parties. The Convention proposed a republican model and a referendum was called for the approval of the Australian electorate. The referendum held on 6 November 1999 failed to achieve the support of either a majority of voters or a majority of states. The national vote of the electors in favour of Australia becoming a republic was 45.13%, with 54.87% against.

The Australian Labor Party advocated for the republic, while the Liberals permitted members to campaign for either side. Notable campaigners for the republic included all the living former Labor prime ministers and former Liberal prime minister Malcolm Fraser and incumbent treasurer Peter Costello. Notable Monarchists included Prime Minister John Howard, Justice Michael Kirby of the High Court of Australia, former Labor opposition leader Bill Hayden and Liberal Aboriginal elder Neville Bonner. Future leaders of the Liberal Party Malcolm Turnbull who led the Australian Republic Movement and Tony Abbott who supported Australians for Constitutional Monarchy took opposing views.

Justice Michael Kirby (a monarchist and leading figure in progressive Australian jurisprudence) ascribed the failure of the republic referendum to ten factors: lack of bi-partisanship; undue haste; a perception that the republic was supported by big city elites; a "denigration" of monarchists as "unpatriotic" by republicans; the adoption of an inflexible republican model by the convention; concerns about the specific model proposed (chiefly the ease with which a prime minister could dismiss a president); a republican strategy of using big "names" attached to the Whitlam era to promote their cause; strong opposition to the proposal in the smaller states; a counter-productive pro-republican bias in the media; and an instinctive caution among the Australian electorate regarding Constitutional change.

Some republicans blamed the conservative and monarchist Prime Minister John Howard (elected in 1996), whose leadership certainly did not aid the republican cause. But there were other significant factors, including a split between "minimalist" republicans who wanted an Australian president to be chosen by the federal Parliament (as happens in, for example, Germany), and more "radical" republicans who wanted a directly elected president, as in the Irish Republic. Public opinion suggested that a republic would only be acceptable if a president was directly elected. Since the referendum proposal was for an indirectly elected president, many radicals opposed it.

The Gillard government which took power in a hung parliament following the 2010 Australian Election has indicated an intention not to revisit the issue of a vote for an Australian republic during the reign of Queen Elizabeth II, while the Opposition Liberal-National Coalition is led by Tony Abbott, a supporter of the constitutional monarchy. Cultural interest in the Royal Family endures, with 7 million Australians (one third of the population) tuning in to watch the Wedding of Prince William and Catherine Middleton in April 2011.

In 2011, Australian public support for a republic fell to its lowest level since March 1994. Support for a republic outright was 41%, with support rising to 48% of respondents in a scenario with Charles on the throne and his wife, Camilla, as princess consort.

== Military engagements in the late 20th century ==
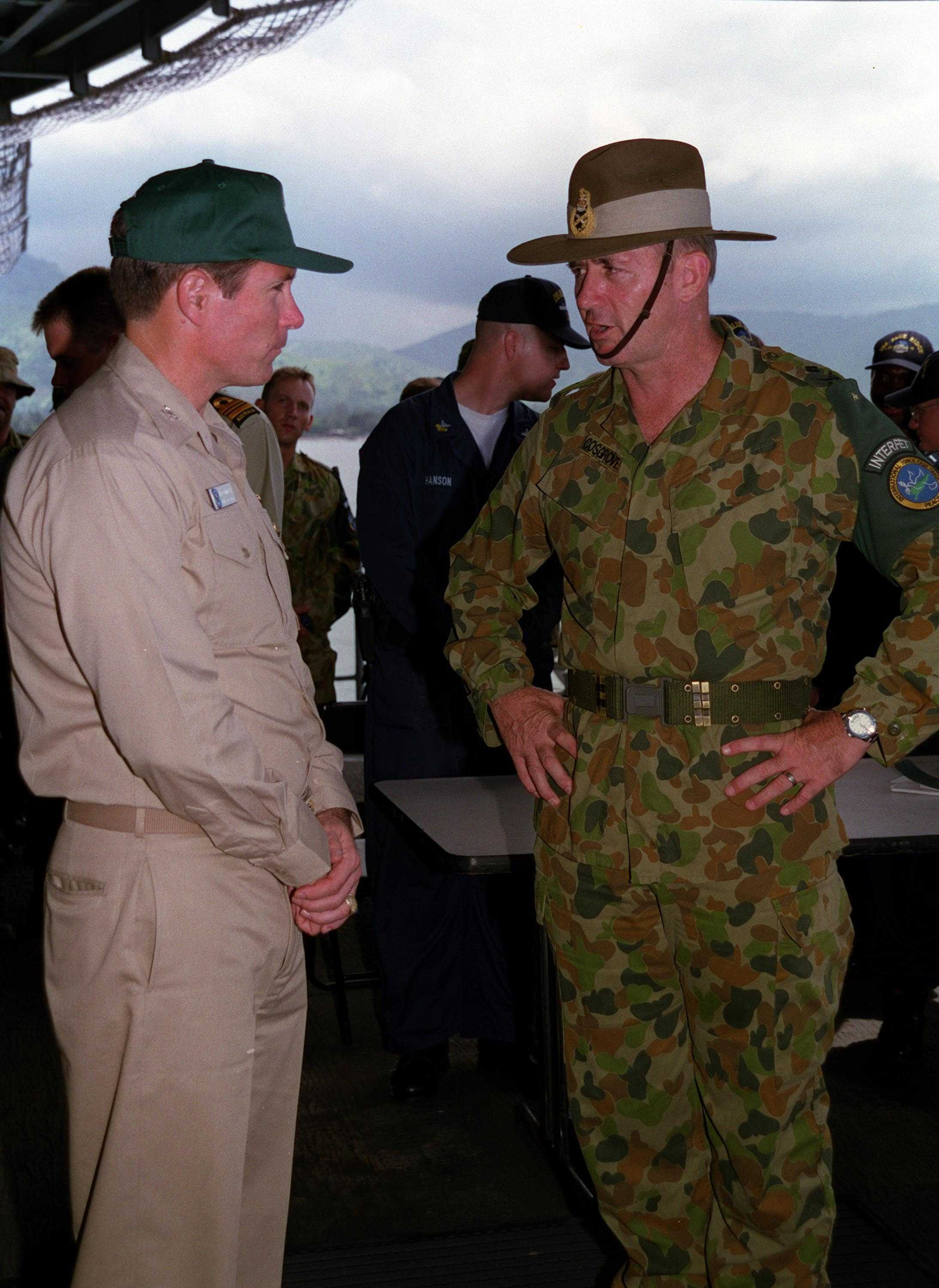
Major General Peter Cosgrove (right) Australian commander of the United Nations backed peace keeping operation (INTERFET) to East Timor.

Following the Vietnam War, Australian military forces were largely kept at home through the rest of the 1970s and 1980s, other than service in United Nations peacekeeping missions. RAAF helicopters operated in the Sinai; and Australian forces assisted in a British Commonwealth operation when Zimbabwe won its independence; as well as a similar operation in Namibia.

Bob Hawke was prime minister at the time of the Fall of the Berlin Wall and end of the Cold War which ushered in a new era of international relations. Royal Australian Navy warships were deployed to the Gulf War by the Hawke government in 1991 and remained in the region to enforce UN-imposed sanctions against Iraq.

=== Peacekeeping ===
Australian forces were very active in UN peacekeeping through the 1990s. In 1993, Foreign Minister Gareth Evans was active in the search for a settlement to ongoing troubles in Cambodia in the aftermath of the genocidal 1970s Pol Pot regime. Australia contributed the force commander and the operation's communications component to the UN operation. In the ultimately unsuccessful Somalia intervention, a battalion-level Australian contingent was employed to aid in the delivery of humanitarian aid in the Baidoa area. In 1994, Australia deployed medical staff to the UN force in Rwanda sent to deal with the aftermath of the Rwandan genocide. A UN Peacekeeping engagement in Bougainville began in 1997, to aid in resolving the long-running conflict between the Papua New Guinea government Bougainville separatists.

There have been a number of other peacekeeping and stabilisation operations: notably in Bougainville, including Operation Bel Isi (1998–2003); as well as Operation Helpem Fren and the Australian led Regional Assistance Mission to Solomon Islands (RAMSI) in the early 2000s; and the 2006 East Timorese crisis

=== East Timor ===
Australia led an important international military mission to East Timor in 1999. Indonesia invaded East Timor in 1975 and annexed the former Portuguese colony. Successive Australian governments, concerned to maintain good relations with Indonesia, had accepted Indonesia control of the territory, however the fall of Indonesian President Suharto and a shift in Australian policy by the Howard government in 1998 precipitated a proposal for a referendum on the question of independence. New Indonesian president B. J. Habibie was prepared to consider a change of status for East Timor. In late 1998, Australian prime minister John Howard with Foreign Minister Alexander Downer drafted a letter Indonesia setting out a major change in Australian policy, suggesting that the East Timor be given a chance to vote on independence within a decade. The letter upset President Habibie, who saw it as implying Indonesia was a "colonial power" and he decided in response to announce a snap referendum. A UN sponsored referendum held in August 1999 showed overwhelming approval for independence. After the result was announced, violent clashes, instigated by a suspected anti-independence militia, sparked a humanitarian and security crisis in the region.

John Howard consulted UN Secretary General Kofi Annan and lobbied U.S. president Bill Clinton to support an Australian-led peacekeeper force to end the violence. Australia, who contributed 5,500 personnel and the force commander, Major General Peter Cosgrove, to the UN-backed International Force East Timor and began deploying on 20 September 1999 and successfully restored order. The operation had been politically and militarily tense. Australia re-deployed frontline combat aircraft northward and detected an Indonesian submarine within the vicinity of Dili Harbour as INTERFET forces approached. While the intervention was ultimately successful, Australian-Indonesian relations would take several years to recover.

=== Al-Qaeda ===
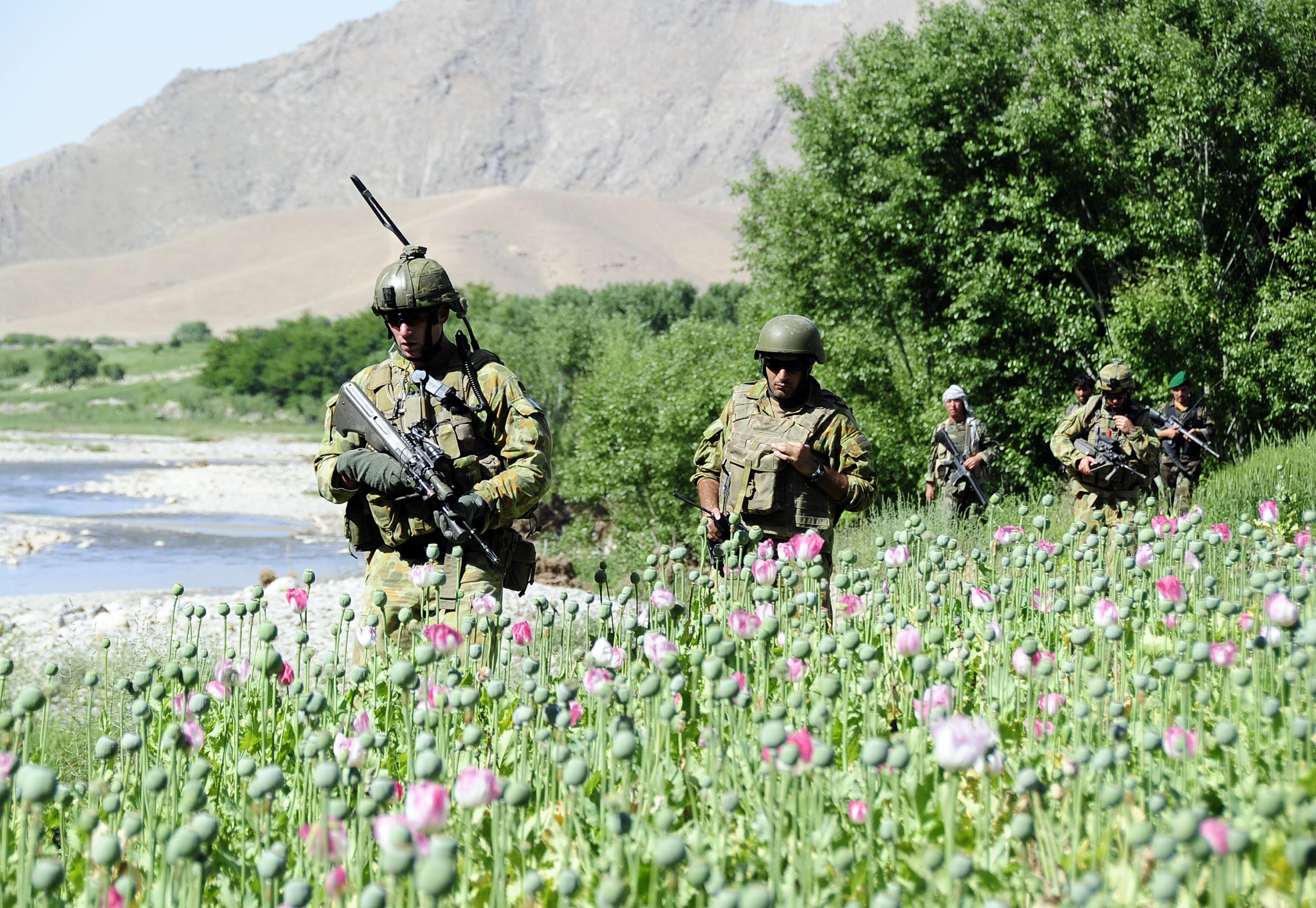
Australian and Afghan soldiers patrol the poppy fields in the Baluchi Valley Region, April 2010

In 1998, a wealthy dissident Saudi Islamist, Osama bin Laden, declared a fatwa calling for the killing of "Americans and their allies -- civilians and military... in any country in which it is possible to do it" in order to bring to an end the ongoing enforcement of the sanctions against Iraq and presence of US troops in the Arabian Peninsula, thus bringing Australians into the line of fire in what would latterly grow to be defined as the war on terror. Following the 11 September terrorist attacks by Al-Qaeda in 2001, On 14 September 2001, the Australian Government cited the terrorist attacks against the US as sufficient basis for invoking the mutual-defence clauses of the ANZUS Treaty. This was the first time the Treaty's clauses on acting to meet a common danger had been invoked since it was enacted in 1952.

The Howard government committed troops to the Afghanistan War (with bi-partisan support) and the Iraq War (meeting with the disapproval of other political parties). SAS troops formed the most high-profile part of Operation Slipper, Australia's contribution to the invading force in the 2001 United States war in Afghanistan. A small number of Australians, including David Hicks, were captured in and around the Afghan Theatre having spent time training or fighting with Al-Qaeda aligned Islamist paramilitaries. Islamists following the Al-Qaeda modus operandi bombed a nightclub in Bali in 2002 and killed 88 Australian civilians. The following year, the Iraq War was launched by a U.S.-British led coalition to overthrow the Saddam Hussein government of Iraq for its non-compliance with the 1991 Gulf War Peace Treaty. Australian contribution to the 2003 invasion of Iraq lasted until 2009 and was highly controversial. Following the death of Al-Qaeda leader Osama bin Laden at the hands of US forces in May 2011, Prime Minister Julia Gillard announced that Australian forces would remain in Afghanistan and said that Bin Laden's death offered a "small measure of justice" to the families of the 105 Australians who been killed in Al-Qaeda attacks in New York, Bali, London and Mumbai since the commencement of the conflict. As of May 2011, a further 24 Australian military personnel had been killed while serving in the Afghanistan conflict (including one with the British Armed Forces).

== Australia in the 21st century ==
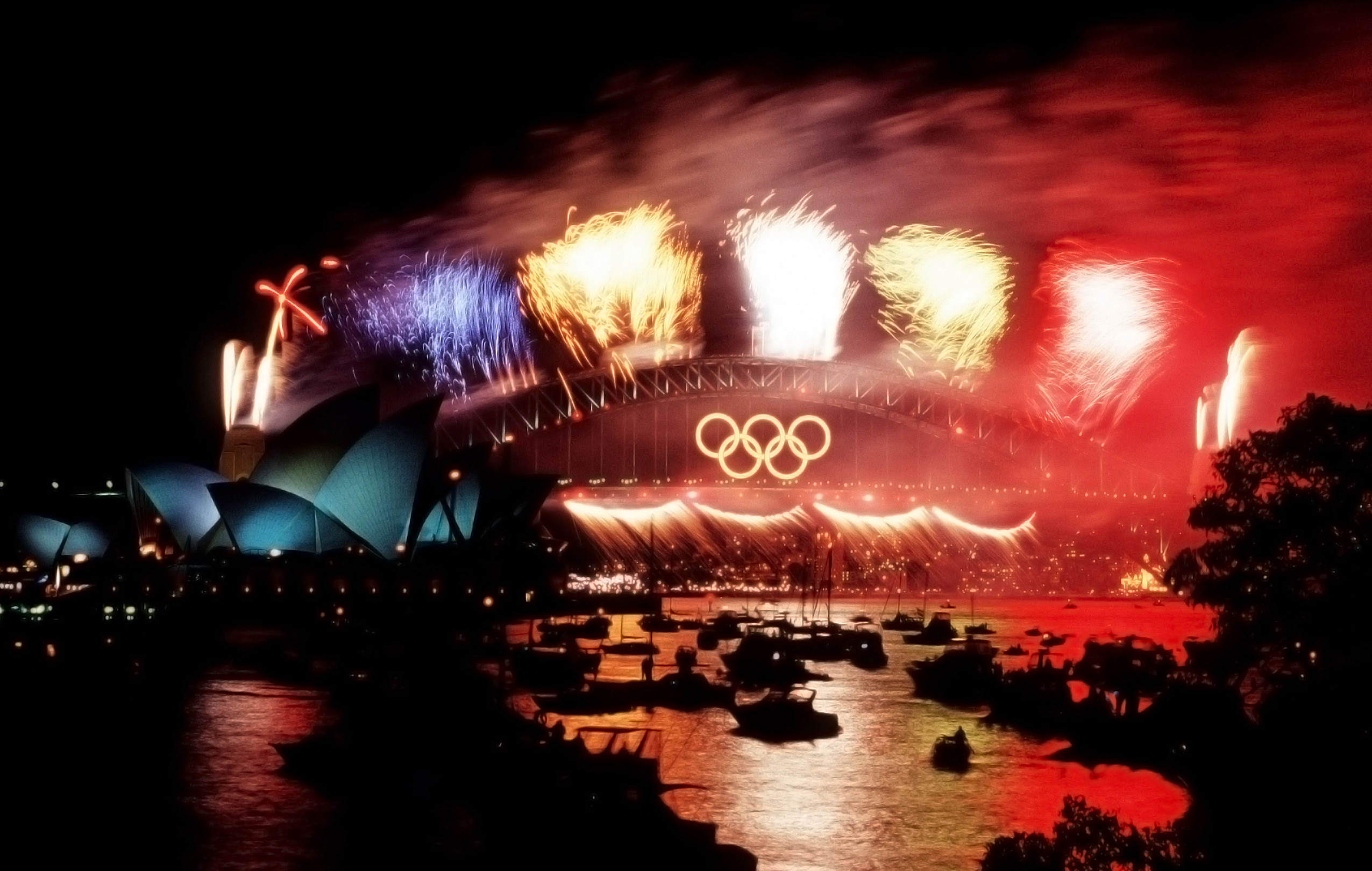
Olympic colours on the Sydney Harbour Bridge in 2000

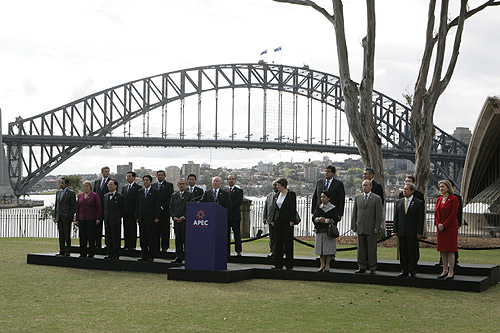
World leaders with Prime Minister John Howard in Sydney for the 2007 APEC conference

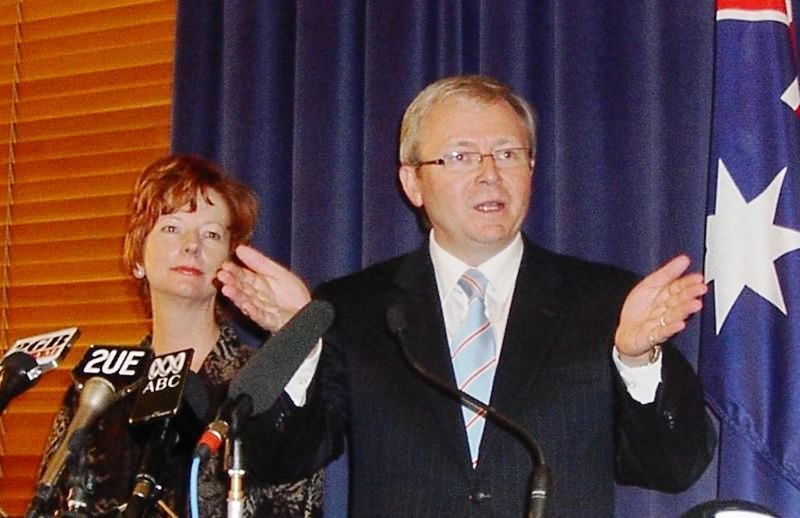
Julia Gillard (left) and Kevin Rudd deliver their first press conference as leaders of the Australian Labor Party, 4 December 2006. Rudd won the 2007 election and was replaced by Gillard in 2010.

John Howard served as Prime Minister from 1996 until 2007, the second-longest prime ministerial term after Robert Menzies. One of the first programs instigated by the Howard government was a nationwide gun control scheme, following a mass shooting at Port Arthur. The government sought to reduce Australia's government deficit and introduced industrial relations reforms, particularly as regards efficiency on the waterfront. After the 1996 election, Howard and treasurer Peter Costello proposed a goods and services tax (GST) which they successfully took to the electorate in 1998. In 1999, Australia led a United Nations force into East Timor to help establish democracy and independence for that nation, following political violence.

The government also accelerated the pace of privatisation, beginning with the government-owned telecommunications corporation, Telstra. Howard's government continued some elements of the foreign policy of its predecessors, based on relations with four key countries: the United States, Japan, China, and Indonesia. The Howard administration strongly supported US engagement in the Asia-Pacific region.

Australia hosted the 2000 Summer Olympics in Sydney to great international acclaim. The Opening Ceremony featured a host of iconic Australian imagery and history and the flame ceremony honoured women athletes, including swimmer Dawn Fraser, with Aboriginal runner Cathy Freeman lit the Olympic flame. At the Closing Ceremony, President of the International Olympic Committee, Juan Antonio Samaranch, declared:

"I am proud and happy to proclaim that you have presented to the world the best Olympic Games ever."

Few international tourists came to Melbourne in 1956 for the Olympics that year, but Sydney gained global attention for a well-attended, efficiently organised world-class event. Prince Philip, representing Queen Elizabeth II opened the 1956 games but neither was invited in 2000, as the spirit of republicanism was too strong. In the long run, as Toohey (2008) reports, many of the hoped-for benefits failed to materialize. Nationwide levels of participation in physical activity and sport did not rise, although passive spectatorship (such as TV watching) did increase. Many of the costly facilities built for the games remained underutilized in their wake.

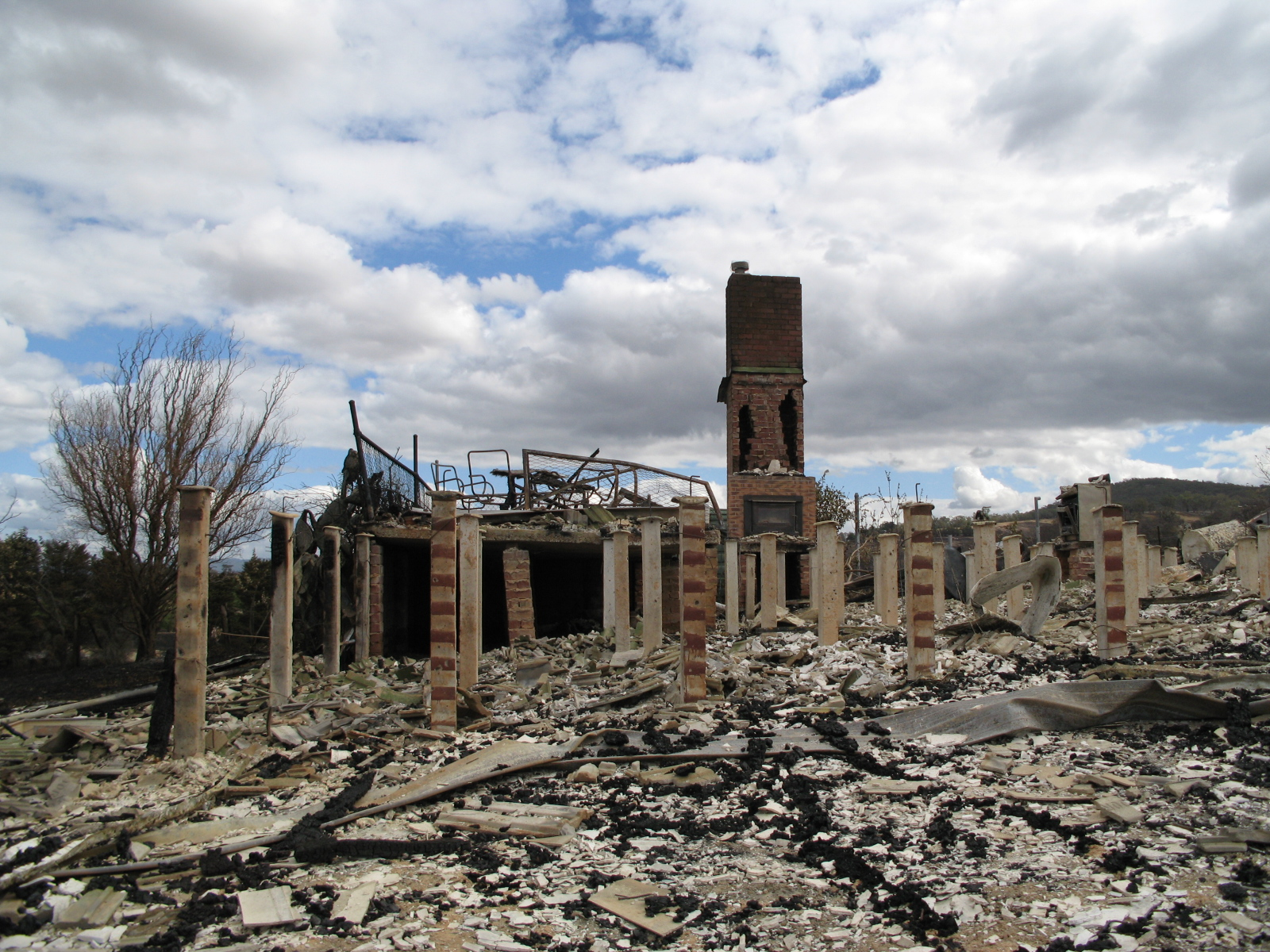
Aftermath of the devastating 2009 Victorian bushfires which killed 173 people

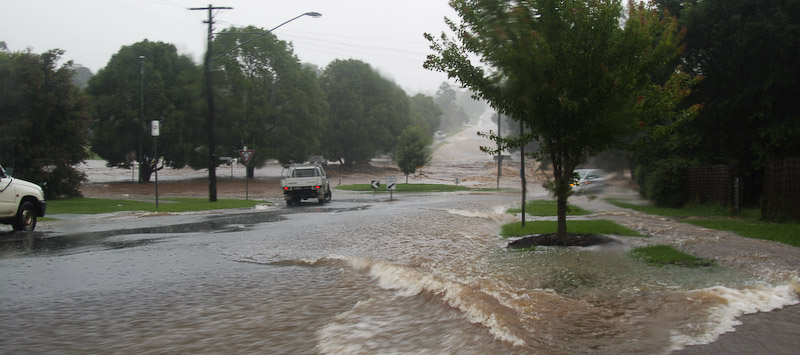
Suburban Toowoomba during the summer 2010–11 Queensland floods

Sydney played host to other important world events over the decade including the 2003 Rugby World Cup, the APEC Leaders conference of 2007 and Catholic World Youth Day 2008. Melbourne hosted the 2006 Commonwealth Games.

In 2001, Australia celebrated its Centenary of Federation, with a program of events, including the creation of the Centenary Medal to honour people who have made a contribution to Australian society or government.

The Howard government expanded immigration overall but instituted often controversial tough immigration laws to discourage unauthorised arrivals of boat people. While Howard was a strong supporter of traditional links to the Commonwealth and to the United States alliance, trade with Asia, particularly China, continued to increase dramatically, and Australia endured an extended period of prosperity. Howard's term in office coincided with the 2001 11 September attacks. In the aftermath of this event, the government committed troops to the Afghanistan War (with bi-partisan support) and the Iraq War (meeting with the disapproval of other political parties).

Southern Australia was affected by a very severe drought, through much of the first decade of the 21st century. By late 2006 water storage throughout southern Australia were at record low levels. Severe restrictions on urban water usage were put in place in every state capital city (except Hobart and Darwin) in 2005–06, and irrigation in the Murray–Darling basin was heavily curtailed. Consequently, issues relating to fresh water supply became an important topic for political discussion, though the economic impact of the drought was felt most keenly only in Australia's sparsely populated agricultural areas.

Howard lost his substantial majority at the 1998 Federal election, improved on it at the 2001 Federal election and at the 2004 election against Labor's Mark Latham. The government however resoundingly lost the 2007 Federal election to the Labor Party led by Kevin Rudd with a wave of support for change and a slogan for "new leadership" for the country.

Kevin Rudd held the office until June 2010, when he was replaced following internal Labor Party coup by his colleague and deputy Julia Gillard. Rudd used his term in office to symbolically ratify the Kyoto Protocol and lead an historic parliamentary apology to the Stolen Generation (those Indigenous Australians who had been removed from their parents by the state during the early 20th century to the 1960s). The mandarin Chinese speaking former diplomat also pursued energetic foreign policy and initially sought to instigate a price on carbon in the Australian economy to combat global warming. His prime ministership coincided with the initial phases of the 2008 financial crisis, to which his government responded through a large package of economic stimulus – the management of which later proved to be controversial.

The Black Saturday bushfires struck Victoria on and around Saturday 7 February 2009. The fires occurred during extreme bushfire-weather conditions, and resulted in Australia's highest ever loss of life from a bushfire; 173 people died and 414 were injured as a result of the fires.

Amidst increasing controversy on management of stimulus spending over policy directions on taxation, immigration and climate change, the Labor Party replaced Rudd with Julia Gillard, who became the first woman Prime Minister of Australia and narrowly retained office against the Liberal-National Coalition led by Tony Abbott, at the 2010 Federal election by securing the support of independent members of the first hung parliament in Australia since the 1940 election.

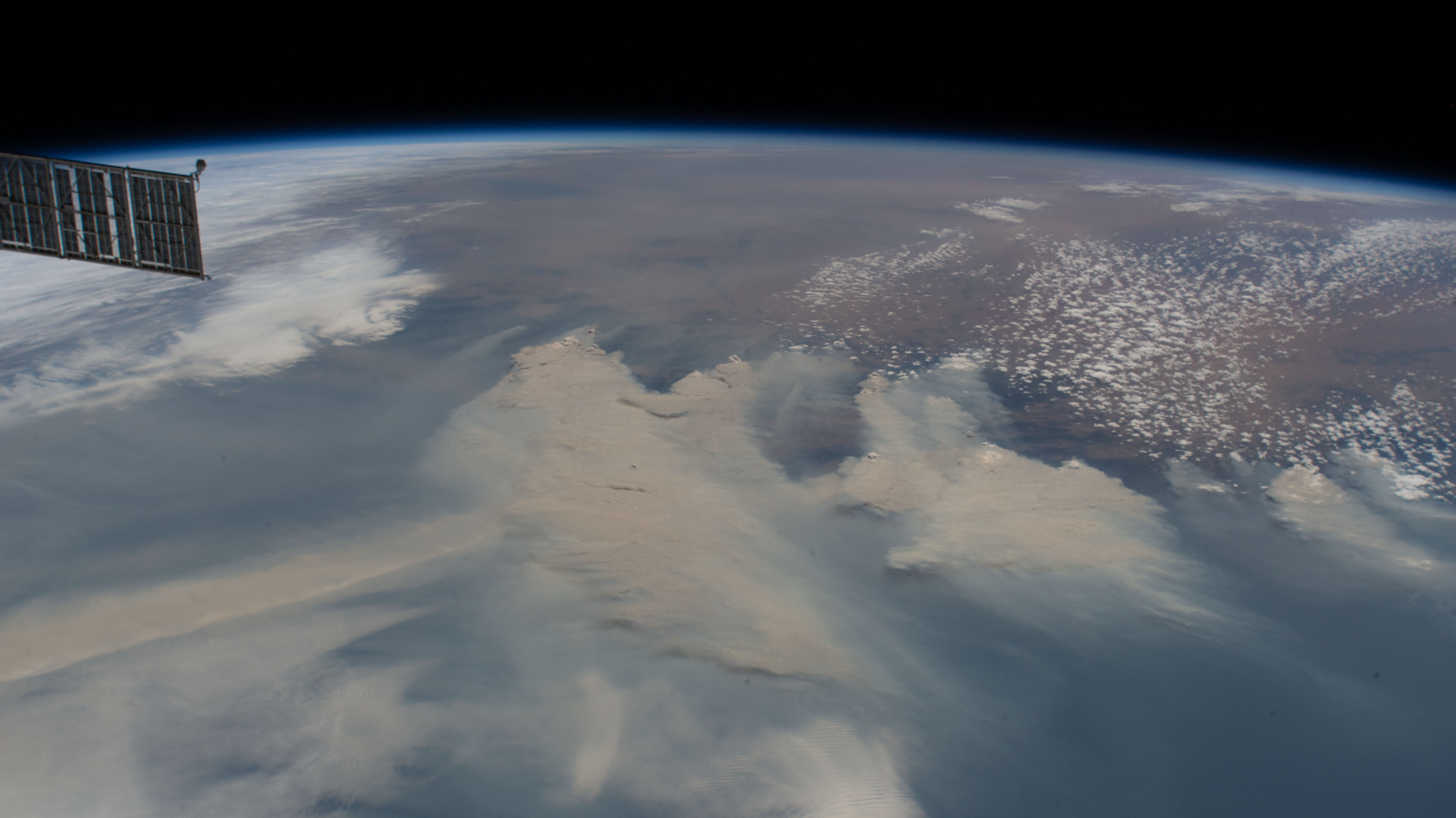
ISS image of the smoke produced from the 2019–20 Australian bushfire season, 4 January 2020

The drought was broken definitively by severe flooding associated with the La Niña weather effect in the summer of 2010–2011. Queensland in particular suffered dramatic flooding which swept through parts of the capital city of Brisbane and caused some deaths and serious financial loss. Soon after tropical cyclone Yasi struck the already beleaguered coast.

Following two and half decades of economic reform and amidst booming trade with Asia, Australia—in stark contrast to most other Western nations—avoided recession following the 2008 financial crisis. Following the 2010 election, the Gillard government entered an alliance with the Australian Greens and was destabilized by breaking an election promise not to introduce a carbon tax, by leadership rivalry and by lacking the numbers to push some controversial legislation through the Parliament. Nevertheless, the cross-bench alliance continued to operate and though facing declining poll support and firm opposition from the Liberal-National Coalition, in October the government successfully passed its Clean Energy Bill 2011 aimed to restructure the Australian economy in order to reduce greenhouse gas emissions associated with global warming by increasing costs to industry for carbon emissions. A carbon tax was introduced in Australia on 1 July 2012. Kevin Rudd was reinstated as prime minister in a Labor leadership spill on 27 June 2013. After the 2013 Australian General Election, Rudd lost the role of prime minister to Tony Abbott, the Liberal Leader. On 15 December 2013, 95% of the Australian military had withdrawn from Afghanistan with the remaining 5% presently training locals in Kabul. The Clean Energy Bill 2011 was repealed by the Abbott government on 17 July 2014, backdated to 1 July 2014. Malcolm Turnbull of the Liberal Party of Australia was elected as Tony Abbott's successor and served as prime minister from 2015 until 2018 where he resigned and was replaced by Scott Morrison.

The last months of 2019 and into early 2020 were marked by intense bushfires on the east coast that became known as the "Black Summer". The fires directly killed 34 people. Approximately 9,352 buildings were destroyed. The fires are very likely Australia's costliest natural disaster at about A$100 billion. They were also notable for the smoke that enveloped areas within Australia well away from the fires for months, and even places 12,000 km (7,500 mi) overseas, reaching as far as South America. Air quality dropped to hazardous levels in all southern and eastern states. Health researcher's modelling indicated that 80 per cent of Australians were affected by bushfire smoke at some point over the fire season. 445 people may have died indirectly from smoke inhalation.

Late January 2020 was also notable for the first local infections of a new virus, severe acute respiratory syndrome coronavirus 2 (SARS-CoV-2). This led into the world-wide COVID-19 pandemic, and the COVID-19 pandemic in Australia that by the end of 2020 had killed 909 in Australia, but as of 5 February 2021, coronavirus disease 2019 (COVID-19) had caused more than 2.29 million deaths world-wide.

In the early morning hours of 9 September 2022 Australia Eastern Standard Time, Queen Elizabeth II died. The Queen was succeeded by her eldest son, King Charles III, who now reigns as the King of Australia.

On 6 October 2025, Australia and Papua New Guinea signed a landmark security and defence cooperation treaty — Australia's first new defence treaty in more than 70 years — aimed at strengthening regional stability, joint military training, and maritime security operations.

== See also ==
- History of broadcasting in Australia
