= 60th Parachute Field Hospital =

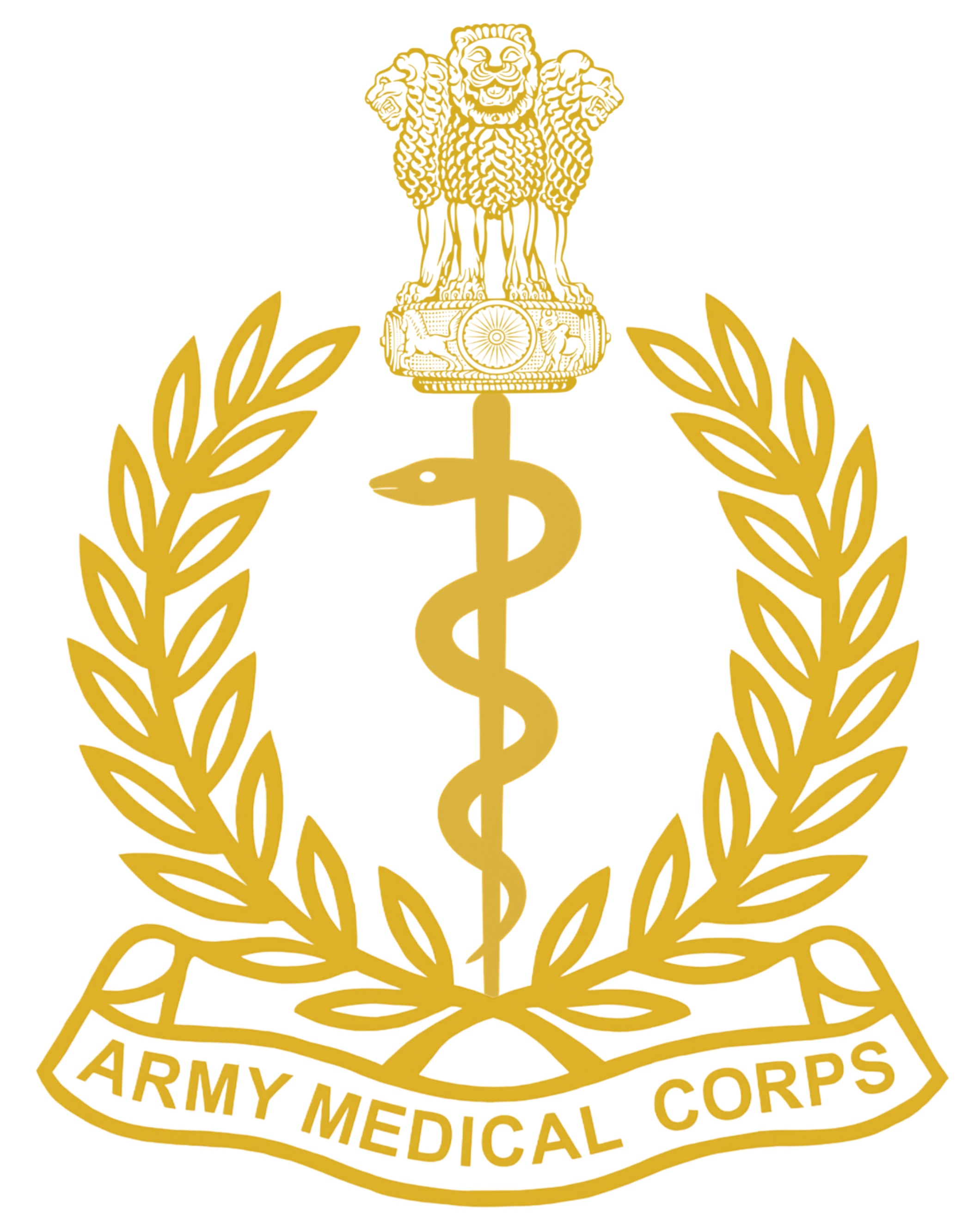
- Cap badge of the Army Medical Corps (India)
- Active: 1942-present
- Country: India
- Branch: Indian Army
- Type: Medical
- Role: Airborne forces
- Part of: Army Medical Corps (India), operationally attached to the 50th Parachute Brigade

The 60th Parachute Field Hospital is an elite airborne medical unit of the Indian Army's Army Medical Corps, and serves as the medical unit attached to the 50th Parachute Brigade. The unit is renowned for its rapid mobilization capabilities into active combat zones and international disaster relief operations, and has earned international acclaim for its work during the Korean War and a number of natural disasters in India and around the world.

== History ==
=== Formation and early operations ===
The 60th Parachute Field Hospital was raised in August 1942 during World War II. It was initially established as the 60th Airborne Field Ambulance to provide frontline medical support and trauma care to parachute brigades operating in battle environments.

== The Korean War ==
During the Korean War, the Indian government contributed the 60 Parachute Field Ambulance to the United Nations Multinational Force. The unit, under the command of Lieutenant Colonel A. G. Rangaraj, India's first military paratrooper, arrived in Busan, South Korea, on November 20, 1950. Functioning as a Mobile Army Surgical Hospital (MASH), the unit was attached to the 27th British Commonwealth Brigade.

In March 1951, the unit participated in Operation Tomahawk, a historic airborne assault where Lt. Col. Rangaraj and his team parachuted into the rice fields near Munsan alongside 4,000 troops of the US 187th Airborne Regimental Combat Team. During the conflict, the unit's personnel treated over 200,000 casualties under severe winter conditions and enemy fire, often improvising with retrieved parachutes to ward off the freezing winds. For their extraordinary gallantry and service, the unit earned numerous awards, including two Maha Vir Chakras, six Vir Chakras, One Bar to Vir Chakra, and 25 Mentions-in-Despatches. They also received honors from South Korea, the UN, a Bronze Star from the US, and a unit citation from General Douglas MacArthur. On their return to India, they were awarded the Presidential Trophy by President, Dr. Rajendra Prasad. They earned the moniker "The Maroon Angels". The unit provided medical support for 4 years and then departed South Korea on 23 February 1954.

== Natural disasters ==
The unit has provided medical assistance during the Uttarakhand floods (2013), Nepal Earthquake of 2015 under the operation name ‘Maitri’. After the 2018 Sulawesi earthquake and tsunami which devastated vast areas of Indonesia, the unit rapidly established a level-2 medical facility to treat hundreds of affected Indonesian citizens as part of operation Samudra Maitri.

In February 2023, after the 7.8-magnitude earthquake in Turkey and Syria, the unit established a level 2 medical facility and 30-bed hospital in Hatay province’s school building, providing a wide range of medical services, including rescue, surgery, dental treatment, X Ray and lab facilities for 3,600 patients over a 12-day period as a part of ‘Operation Dost’.

In April 2025 in the aftermath of the 7.7 magnitude earthquake in Mandalay, Myanmar, the unit was deployed under Operation Brahma. It established a twin parallel operation theatre and conducted 65 major surgeries, and provided medicines to the local population.

After the 2025 Cyclone Ditwah in Sri Lanka, the unit deployed an 85 member medical team which provided comprehensive medical, surgical and dental care for over 7000 Sri Lankan civilians effected by the cyclone.

In July 2026, the unit was deployed under Operation Amistad to help provide medical support in the aftermath of a devastating earthquake in Venezuela. It provided emergency first aid, trauma care and life-saving surgeries to earthquake victims.

== Notable personnel ==
- Colonel Dr. A. G. Rangaraj, awarded the Mahavir Chakra for his role in the Korean war. In a career spanning over 2 decades, he served in World War II, the India–Pakistan war of 1947–1948, the Korean War and the Liberation of Goa.
- Lt. Col. Dr. J Farida Rehana, the first woman army officer to qualify as a paratrooper. She actively participated in the India–Pakistan war of 1971, where she served on both the fronts simultaneously, earning the Paschimi Star Medal and Poorvi Star Medal. She also participated in Operation Cactus-Lilly.
