= Mathura Singh =

Indian revolutionary (1883–1918)

Doctor Mathura Singh
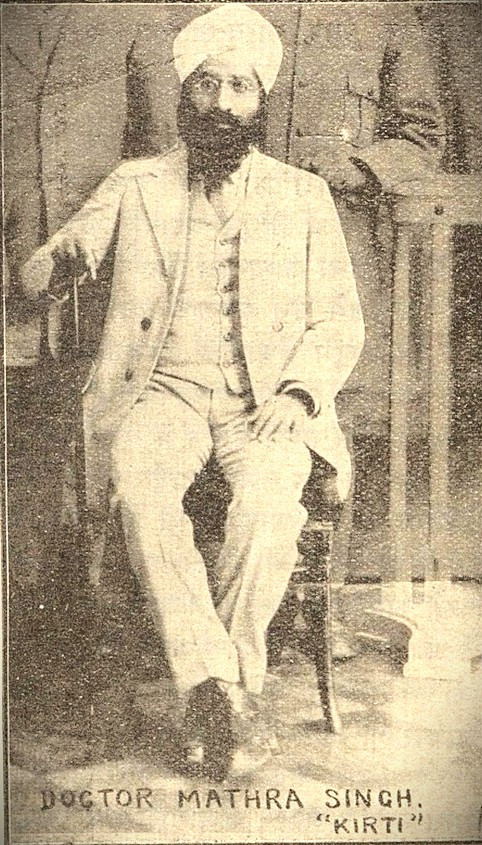
- Revolutionary Mathura Singh
- Born: 1883; Dhudial, district Jhelum (Pakistan)
- Died: 28 March 1918 (aged 34–35); Lahore Central Jail
- Cause of death: execution by hanging
- Occupation: Revolutionary
- Organization: Ghadr party
- Movement: Indian Independence Movement
- Father: Sardar Hari Singh

Mathura Singh (1883 – 28 March 1918) was the International Ambassador of Ghadar Movement. An expert in bomb-making, he waged war to overthrow the British Imperialist government to liberate India to establish a people's government based on equality, fraternity and liberty and ultimately laid his life on the gallows in Lahore jail on 28 March 1918.

== Early life and education ==
Mathura Singh was born in the village Dhudial, district Jhelum (Pakistan) in 1883. His father's name was Sardar Hari Singh. He received his early education in his village and later went to the high school in Chakwal. He had a very sharp intellect and fared very well amongst his classmates.

== Career ==
After completing his matriculation, he apprenticed privately as a doctor. Messer Jagat Singh and Brother's shop is still intact in Rawalpindi to date. He had started learning his job there. He used to work with great diligence and became proficient after performing 3-4 times. Thereafter he opened his shop. This shop was in Naushera Cantonment. He had subscribed to health journals from all the countries. He decided to go to America for specialised education. The imbroglio of the shop had still not been resolved when his wife and son passed away. However, this failed to deter him and he departed for America in 1913. He had to halt in Shanghai due to lack of money. He started practising medicine there and achieved great success. But he had a mind to go to Canada and thus left along with some other Indians. He faced enormous hardships there. Initially, only he and another Indian got permission to disembark while the rest were not. Due to this reason, he too decided not to disembark. Later, at the insistence of some friends, he did land but got into trouble with immigration officials for the sake of fellow travelers. A trial was conducted. However, the law and courts safeguard the interests of only the powerful and not the inhabitants of a slave country. He along with other Indian travellers was forced to return from there on the very same flimsy excuse of not reaching Canada directly on a ship.

=== Involvement in Ghadr movement ===
He returned to Shanghai. Upon return, he narrated his poignant tale of woe and humiliation to Indians and suggested Baba Gurdit Singh ji to hire his ship which should sail directly to Canada. Baba Ji rented a ship following his suggestion and named it Guru Nanak Ship. As he had to return to Punjab for some reason while the ship promptly got ready to leave, he could not arrive in time to board the ship. Along with 35 other co-farers, he sailed off from Singapore on another ship hoping to join the Komagata Maru at Shanghai. Upon reaching Hong Kong he discovered that the ship had already left. Now he had solemnly resolved to dedicate his life for the sake of India's liberation. He started to propagate the cause in Hong Kong. The newspaper Ghadar used to reach here was delivered from America. He too began to print and distribute a similar anonymous paper. He was constantly getting the news in respect of the atrocities being committed on Komagata Maru ship passengers. When it was learned that the Komagata Maru would have to return, he zealously started propaganda. A Sikh police inspector was engaged in the suppression of all such movements in Canton. He called on him and after the ensuing conversation, the Sikh official himself became his collaborator for the cause. He had to leave for Shanghai for some work. While leaving he told everyone that he intended to leave for India by boarding the Komagata Maru. Getting wind of the resolve, the government did not grant permission to anchor the ship in Shanghai. After two or three days everyone left for India by different ships. While the Komagata Maru ship was still anchored in Hooghly, these people had already reached Calcutta. The government booked him a ticket for Punjab and got him to board a train. Before he reached Amritsar, the saga of Budge-Budge occurred. People got so restive and furious on receiving this news; that the fires of revenge got ignited. However, he pacified other comrades by reasoning and motivated them to carry out publicity at first and started the organisational work himself. He was assigned the job of bomb-making and he was very skilled in this task. Hundreds of activists started arriving from America to augment the fire of revolt. All arrangements were executed expeditiously. Seeing such a massive organisation of the rebellion taking shape, it was planned to raise the banner of a pan-Indian revolt simultaneously and the date for the same was set. However, the entire enterprise failed. Everything planned so meticulously, went awry on account of the treachery of one Kirpal Singh. Arrests started but Dr. Mathura couldn't get caught.

=== Mission outside India ===
Once an informer, on the payroll of the government, advised Mathura Singh to become an approver instead of pardon and a big reward. He contemptuously declined it. On another occasion, a secret police official reached out to him but he was well aware that the doctor was a fearless revolutionary. Therefore, he did not dare to catch him directly. On the contrary, he told him that he had come to inform him that the government had granted him reprieve and promised a reward. He well understood that these phrases were a cover-up for his lack of courage to capture him. Therefore, he ostensibly expressed some agreement with him and then managed to flee. Thus he discovered that while living in India, it was impossible to avoid arrest any further. Therefore, he left for Kabul. He got captured at Wazirabad station but could evade arrest by bribing the officials. Thereafter he moved towards Kohat. Police got this news and a heavy police guard was positioned at the railway station. A lot of police personnel boarded the train and all the compartments were searched. But he couldn't be apprehended. After staying there for a few days he reached Kabul. Soon, he became quite famous. Taking cognizance of his competence, he was appointed Chief Medical Officer of Kabul.

=== New attempts for uprising outside India ===
Though the attempt at revolt in India failed, vigorous efforts were afoot overseas. The provisional government of India had been formed in Kabul which was devoted to India's liberation in collaboration with Germany. At that time the Indian diaspora which included Hindus, Muslims and Sikhs in Arab, Egypt, Mesopotamia, Iran etc. were attempting a revolt in India. He too involved himself in the very same endeavour. In this connection. He had to visit Germany and returned after a few days. He had to visit Iran frequently. Later it was decided that a letter be dispatched to the Tsar of Russia soliciting his support for the Indian revolution. Accompanied by numerous attendants and camels laden with goods, he departed in great style. However, he was ignorant of the fact that all the news of his travel was being leaked by a traitor to the British government. He was arrested in the city of Tashkent. He was brought to Iran for identification and the trial ensued. Many people tried to obviate handing him over to the Indian government but like all other failed attempts earlier, this one too was doomed to fail.

== Trial and death sentence ==
Mathura Singh was brought to Lahore. Those were the days when Michael O’Dwyer's writ ran large. After the charade of justice, the death sentence was pronounced on him. He received the news by evincing immense delight. His younger brother came to visit him in Jail. He asked him, “Brother, are you worried about my imminent death?” The youngster broke down. In a tone mixed with anguish and enthusiasm, he said to him, “Come on! This is a moment to celebrate. Do Sikhs shed tears while laying down their lives for the country? I am enormously happy that I had performed to the best of my abilities for the Indian freedom and I shall peacefully embrace death at the gallows.” He tried to lend him courage in this manner.

On February 21, 1917, Dr Singh was placed before a Special Tribunal with the charge of waging war against the King, etc. (Sections 121,121A,131,132,302-109 T.P.С.). The judgment awarding capital punishment was received by the accused Mathura Singh with the greatest unconcern. Dr. Mathura Singh, a redoubtable fighter and a strong arm of the revolution, was hanged on March 28, 1918, in the Lahore Central Jail.
