= Battle of Maryang-san =

Battle of Maryang-san refers to several engagements during the Korean War:

- First Battle of Maryang-san, in October 1951
- Second Battle of Maryang-san, in November 1951
