= Indian Special Forces Training School =

Indian Army training institution

The Indian Army's Special Forces Training School is the training institution for Indian Army special forces, based at Nahan, a hill town in Himachal Pradesh. It is the largest and most important training institution for special forces in India. The Indian Army conducts joint special forces exercises and training with the special forces of countries such as the United Kingdom, United States, Sri Lanka, Russia, France, Bangladesh, Poland and Thailand at this school.

== History ==
A need to reorganize the then Para commando battalions was felt as the existing battalions were essentially elite infantry troops. On 15 July 1987, the Chief of Army Staff (COAS) gave his approval for the creation of HQ Special Forces and for raising the Special Forces Training Wing (SFTW) to cater for courses specific to special forces which were neither available nor feasible in other schools of instruction. The complete process was delayed due to the deployment of all three commando battalions under an ad hoc headquarters for Operation Pawan in Sri Lanka.

== Progressive Development of School ==
The Special Forces Training School was raised as part of the Headquarters Special Forces of War Establishment. The raising was part of an upgrade of the Para SF battalions to more versatile special forces capable of conducting a wide variety of strategic and operational tasks, both overt and covert, in war and low-intensity conflict situations.

In December 1997, the Special Forces Training School was reorganized and redesignated as Special Forces Training Wing. In January 2003, Army Headquarters Military Operations Directorate approved the restructuring of the Special Forces Training Wing to overcome the drawbacks in its erstwhile organization. As part of the major policy decisions approved by the COAS, the Special Forces Training Wing was again redesignated as a Special Forces Training School, and at the same time as a Cat 'A' Training Establishment for the Indian Army. The school at present is located at its intermediate or temporary location. The land acquisition process for the permanent location of the school is in progress. The Army needs 1,500 acres for the permanent location. The school will have its airfield in its permanent location. The school is one of its kind and imparts rigorous training. Most courses conducted at the school require the students to be mentally, physically, and psychologically fit. The school has trained the Special Forces of IAF and the Indian Navy in addition to a host of foreign Special Forces. The Special Forces of the ANA share a special bond with SFTS due to the immense benefit they have acquired in being able to fight the Taliban and ISIS due to the excellent training at SFTS.

== See also ==
- Indian Army Para (Special Forces) Selection
