= Para (Special Forces) =

Military unit of the Indian Army

- Balidan Badge of the Para (SF)
- Active: 1 July 1966–present (60 years, 4 months)
- Country: India
- Branch: Indian Army
- Type: Special forces
- Size: 15 battalions (5 Airborne units, 10 Special Forces Units)
- Part of: Parachute Regiment
- Garrison/HQ: Bengaluru Cantonment, Bengaluru
- Mottos: Men apart, every man an emperor & Shatrujeet (Conqueror of Enemies)
- Colours: Maroon
- Anniversaries: 1 July
- Engagements: Indo-Pakistani War of 1965; Indo-Pakistani War of 1971; Indian Army United Nations peacekeeping missions Operation Blue Star; Operation Cactus; Operation Pawan; Operation Sunrise; Operation Golden Bird; Kargil War; Operation Rakshak; Operation Khukri; 2015 counter-insurgency operation in Myanmar; 2016 EDI-Pampore Building Attack; 2016 Line of Control strike

Commanders
- Current commander: Lt. Gen. Pushpendra Singh SM**

Insignia
- Balidan Badge or the Badge of Sacrifice

- Parachute Regiment cap badge

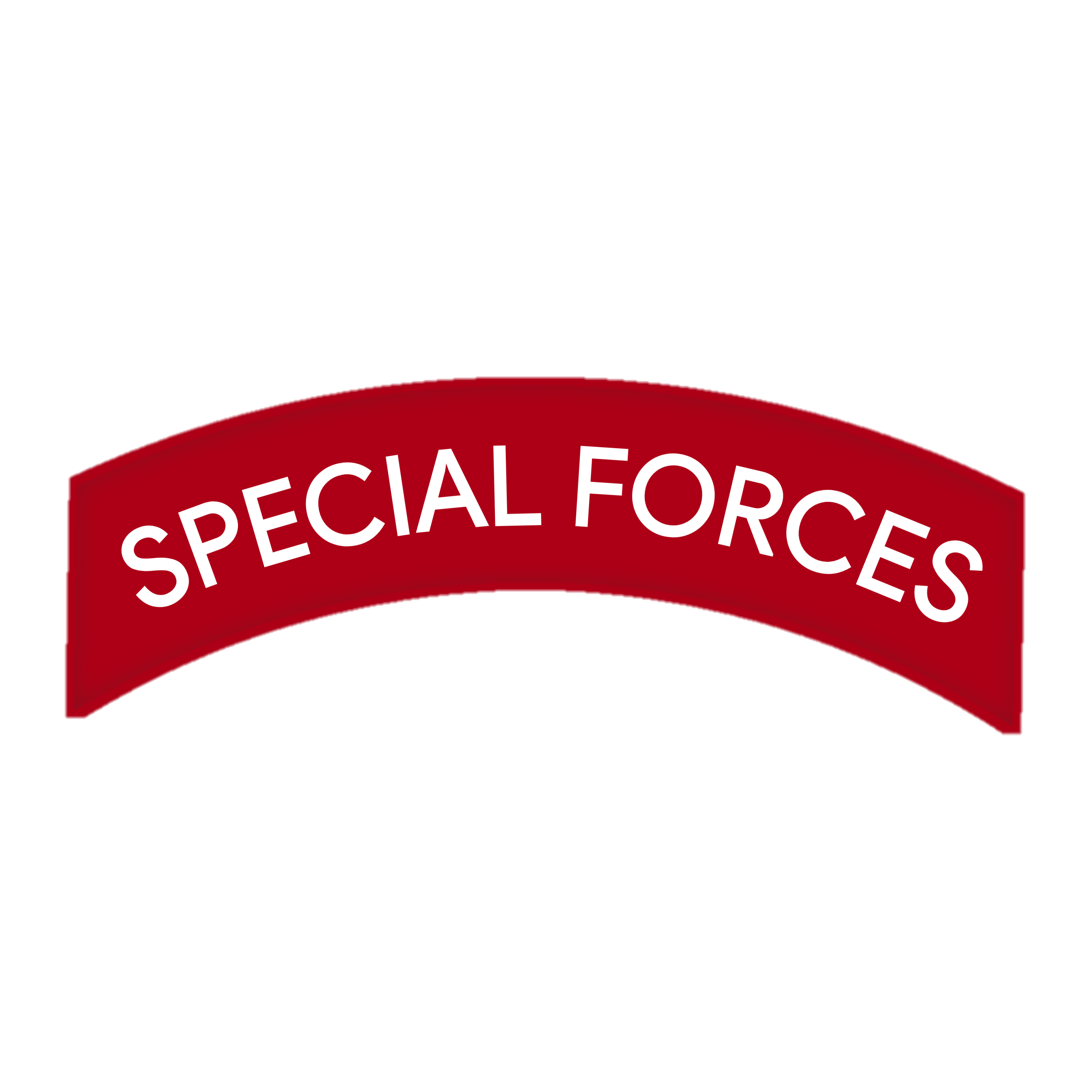
- Special Forces shoulder patch

- Parachute Wings chest patch

The Para (Special Forces), informally referred to as Para SF, is a group of special forces battalions of the Parachute Regiment in the Indian Army. These units specialise in various roles including counter-insurgency, counter-terrorism, direct action, hostage rescue, special reconnaissance and unconventional warfare.

The unit's heritage stems from World War II, with the creation of the 50th Parachute Brigade in October 1941 under the British Indian Army. 9 Para (SF) was raised in 1965 as the 9th Parachute Commando Battalion (as part of the Parachute Regiment) and is the oldest among the fifteen Para (SF) units of the Indian Army. It has been involved in various operations including the Indo-Pakistan war of 1971 (including Chachro Raid), Operation Bluestar, Operation Pawan, Operation Cactus, Kargil War, Operation Ginger, 2015 Indian counter-insurgency operation in Myanmar, 2016 Pampore stand-off, 2016 Indian Line of Control strike and in several anti-terror operations.

== History ==
The parachute units of the Indian Army are among the oldest airborne units in the world. The 50th Indian Parachute Brigade was formed on 27 October 1941, comprising the British 151st Parachute Battalion, the British Indian Army 152nd Indian Parachute Battalion, and the 153rd Gurkha Parachute Battalion. The Parachute Regiment was formed from these and several other units in 1952. The three battalions serving with the Parachute Brigade were removed from their respective Infantry Regiments to form the Parachute Regiment. Since then the Parachute Regiment has grown to comprise ten battalions including Parachute (Special Forces) battalions. In 1986, 8 PARA became 12 Battalion, Mechanised Infantry Regiment, while 21 Maratha LI converted to PARA (Special Forces). During their short but eventful existence so far, the regiment's battalions have had extensive operational experience, and singular achievements, to speak of their level of professionalism.

In 1944, the 50th was allocated to the newly founded 44th Airborne Division. In the post-independence restructuring, India retained only one parachute brigade—the 50th. This brigade consisted of three distinguished battalions personally nominated by the then Commander-in-Chief, namely 1 PARA (Punjab Regiment), 2 PARA (Maratha Light Infantry) and 3 PARA (Kumaon Regiment). During the Jammu and Kashmir operations of 1947–48, these battalions distinguished themselves with glory in the battles of Shelatang, Naushera, Jhangar, and Poonch, and were awarded the respective Battle Honours.

During the Indo-Pakistani War of 1965, an ad hoc commando unit, named Megh Force, consisting of volunteers from various infantry units was organised by then Colonel Megh Singh of the 5 Brigade of the Guards. The unit performed exceptionally well during the war destroying many strategic bridges and killing many Pakistani soldiers, and thus the government authorised the formal raising of a commando unit. Col Megh Singh was selected to raise the unit which was originally intended to be a part of the Brigade of the Guards. However, recognising parachute qualification as an integral element of special operations, the unit was transferred to the Parachute Regiment and raised as its 9th Battalion (Commando) on 1 July 1966. The erstwhile members of the Meghdoot Force formed the nucleus, and the new unit was based in Gwalior. In June 1967 the unit was split equally into two to form a second commando unit, designated as 10th Battalion, each with three Companies. 10th Battalion was mandated to operate in the Western Desert and 9th Battalion in the northern mountains. In 1969, these battalions were re-designated as 9 and 10 Para (Commando) battalions.

In 1978, the 1 Para, as an experiment, was converted to become the first special forces unit of the Indian army and was kept as the tactical reserve. Already a recipient of the Chief of Army Staff Unit Citation twice, and the GOC-in-C Eastern Command Unit Citation once, the unit was originally 1 Punjab Regiment, which was later re-designated as 1 PARA (Punjab) and in 1978 was converted to 1 PARA (SF).

On 15 January 1992, the Parachute Regiment Training Centre along with the Records and PAO (OR), and the Para Regiment, moved to Bangalore and occupied the erstwhile location of Pioneer Corps and Training Centre. Bangalore is the new Key Location Project of the center.

1995 saw the formation of the fourth commando battalion when 21 Maratha Light Infantry was selected to convert to special forces and slated for the Eastern Command. After a stringent selection and training process that spanned more than a year, on 1 February 1996, the unit under Colonel VB Shinde was formally inducted as the 21st Battalion (Special Forces), The Parachute Regiment, originally raised by Colonel I. Ramachandran. The unit has done well in its short lifespan and is the proud recipient of the Chief of Army Staff Unit Citation thrice (1992, 2006, and 2011) and the GOC-in-C Eastern Command Unit Citation twice (2008 and 2016), as well as a host of individual gallantry awards. The most notable operations are in the Loktak Lake of Manipur. With the changing scenario in military operations and the need for more special forces units, 2 Para began the conversion process from parachute to special forces role, followed closely by the 3rd Para and the 4th Para in the years 2004 and 2005. Further 11th Para (SF) in 2011, 12th Para (SF) in 2013, and 13th Para (SF) in 2022 were raised from within the strength of the regiment to augment the strength of the existing Special Forces battalions. In 2022, in 5th Para, 6th Para, 7th Para, 23rd Para, and 29th Para, the airborne punch of the Indian Army was reorganised and redesignated as PARA (SF) on Modification Airborne and were given the specialist role with dual tasking of Airborne as well as the special tasks giving a significant boost to the operational capability of Indian Army.

=== 1971 Indo-Pakistan War ===
The unit first saw action in the 1971 Indo-Pakistani war, the first six-man assault team was inserted 240 kilometres (150 miles) deep into Indus and Chachro, where they carried out raids. The assault team killed 73 and wounded 140 on the Pakistani side. In addition, they also destroyed 35mm artillery guns of the Pakistan independent battery. They also destroyed an airfield. In Bangladesh 2 PARA (Airborne), which was a part of the 50 (Independent) Parachute Brigade, carried out India's first airborne assault operation to capture Poongli Bridge in Mymensingh District near Dhaka. Subsequently, they were the first unit to enter Dhaka. For this action 2 PARA were given the Battle Honour of Poongli Bridge and the Theatre Honour Dhaka. In the Western Sector the unit was also involved in the Battle of Chamb.

==== Operation Mandhol ====
Operation Mandhol was a raid carried out by soldiers from the 9 Para (SF) to seek and destroy Pakistani artillery located in hostile territory near a village called Mandole. During the operation, aided by an artillery officer Capt. D Tyagi from 195 Mountain Regiment, six artillery guns were destroyed by a raiding team composed of six officers and around 120 soldiers led by Major C. M. Malhotra. The special forces raiders began their operation at 5.30 PM on 13 December 1971. They started from Poonch and crossed the Poonch River. After they reached the Mandole village, they started searching for the artillery guns and eventually located them. The Raiders divided themselves into six teams. Each one of the six teams was tasked to destroy one of the six guns. Subsequently, an intense gunfight took place between the Indian raiders and Pakistan Army soldiers. The gunfight resulted in two Indian casualties namely Paratrooper Rajmal and Paratrooper Balwan Singh who was a resident of Village Moungri of District Udhampur of J&K and many Pakistani casualties, with some Pakistani soldiers escaping from the battle. Finally, the raiders destroyed all the artillery using explosives and returned to their base at 6.30 AM on 14 December 1971.

This operation caused the Pakistan military to tweak its military doctrine by assigning additional soldiers to defend artillery guns. Pakistan Army officials, who came to India as a delegation after the war had ended, acknowledged the raid. Operation Mandhol is now a part of the syllabus at the Indian Military Academy.

==== Chachro Raid ====
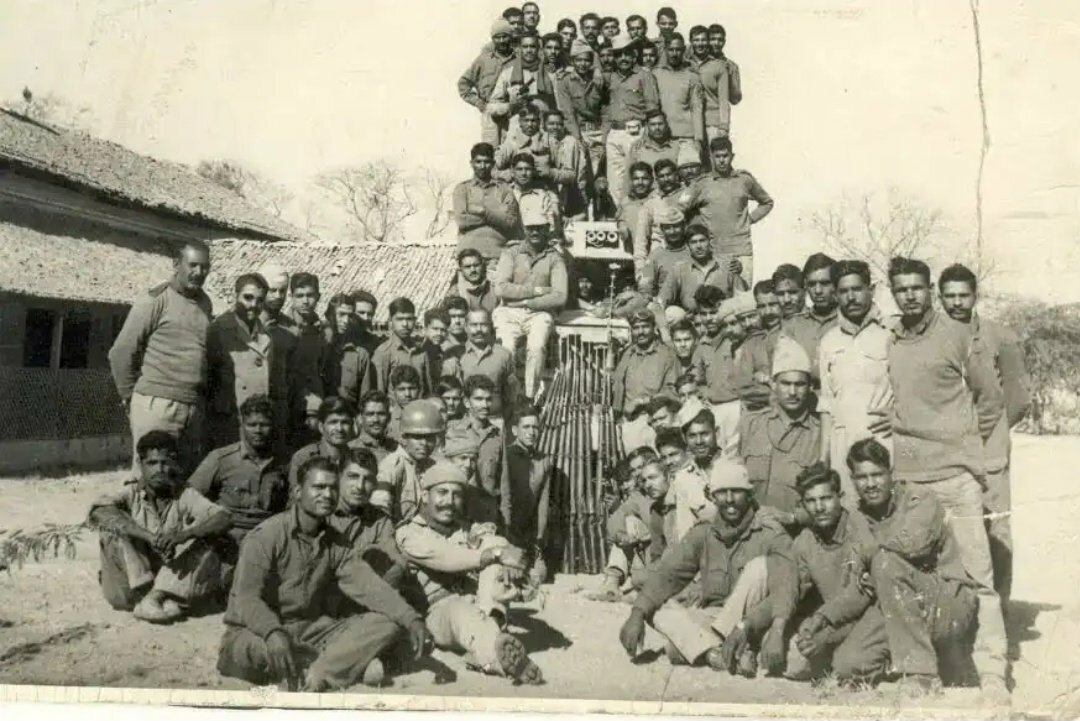
10 Para (SF) after capturing Chachro Village during 1971 war

A series of raids were conducted by soldiers from the 10 Para (also known as The Desert Scorpions) at Chachro, Virawah, Nagarparkar and Islamkot during the 1971 Indo-Pakistani war. The main objective of these raids was to hit Pakistan military installations located 80 kilometers inside hostile territory, disrupting supply lines, creating confusion, and undertaking important inroads into hostile territory. Two teams, codenamed Alpha and Charlie, trained for five months in skills such as desert warfare.

During the raids, the para commandos inserted themselves 80 kilometers deep into Pakistani territory and traversed a distance of over 500 kilometers, attacking Pakistan military installations and positions. They completed the raids with zero Indian casualties.

The raids began on 5 December 1971, when commandos from the 10 Para penetrated 70 kilometers inside hostile territory. The soldiers went into a defensive posture as they encountered heavy firing from Pakistani posts. The Indian raiders sent one of their vehicles rushing towards Pakistani positions, firing an LMG, to distract gunfire. This tactic was successful because nighttime provided cover to the para commandos. Subsequently, the other raiders too opened fire and overpowered the Pakistani posts.

Soon, a pathfinder team was assigned the task of charting a route for the Alpha team to attack the wing headquarters of the Pakistan Rangers in Chachro. The pathfinders used the cover of darkness to chart a suitable route and green-lighted the raid before the dawn of 7 December. Within a few hours, the team killed 17 Pakistani soldiers, took 12 prisoners, and captured Chachro. After this raid, the Charlie team exfiltrated out of the battlefield. Chachro was subsequently handed over to Indian infantrymen and the Alpha team proceeded further.

The Alpha team moved towards their next targets: Virawah and Nagarparkar. They reached Virawah before the dawn of 8 December, moving in broad daylight the preceding day. The first contact made by the raiders with the Pakistani soldiers was at 1:30 AM. Hand-to-hand combat between the Indian raiders and the Pakistanis ensued, followed by gunfights. Soon, Virawah was captured by the Indian raiders. The raiders then proceeded to Nagarparkar and captured it by the morning of 8 December.

Following this, the Indian raiders returned to their base in India but were again tasked to attack an ammunition dump in Islamkot. The raiders reached their target at 5:30 AM on 17 December but found the target empty. Subsequently, while retreating, the raiders ambushed a Pakistani convoy, killing 18-20 Pakistani troops and imprisoning survivors.

=== Operation Bluestar 1984 ===
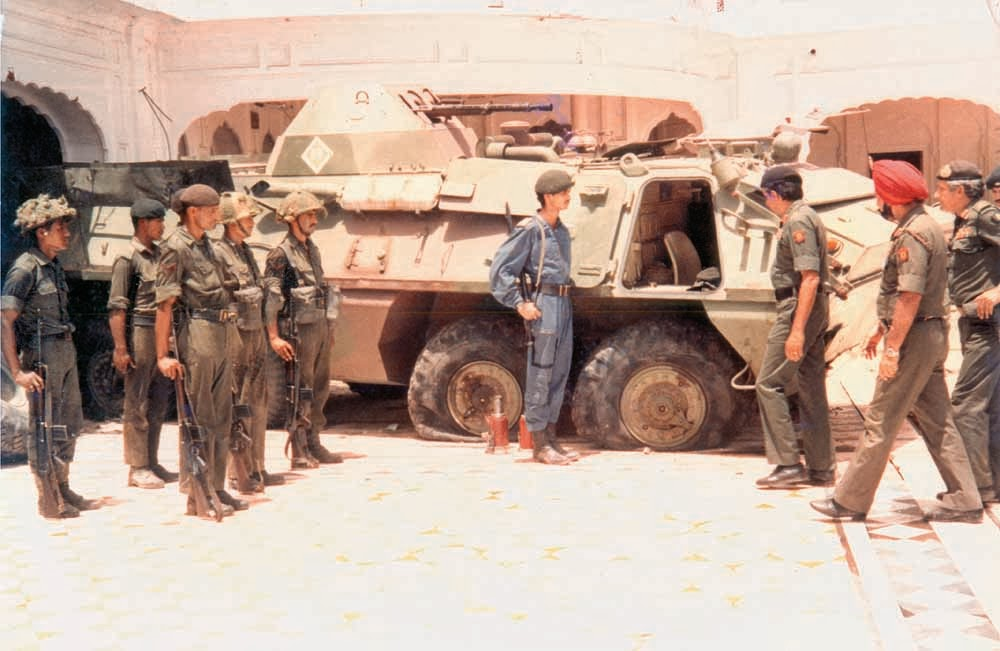
1 Para (SF) during Operation Blue Star

In 1984 the Para (SF) was involved in Operation Blue Star. They were charged with leading an attack to evict Sikh militants hiding inside the Holy Site of the Sikh religion the Golden Temple Punjab. 80 members of 1 Para (SF) were given the task of assaulting two areas of the temple, one of which required divers. However, there were several setbacks as a result of inaccurate intelligence on the strength of the militants who were trained by Gen. Shabeg Singh (ex-Indian Army), operating in low light, the conventional manner of the raid, and the lack of incentive, all of which resulted in a mission failure. The diver mission was aborted after the first team got bogged down. The commandos accompanied by Raghunath Dubey achieved their aims after a gunfight with militants that lasted hours.

=== Sri Lanka 1987 ===
The late 1980s saw the Para (SF) in action in Sri Lanka, as part of Operation Pawan. However, the lack of proper planning by the Indian Peace Keeping Force (IPF), and insufficient intelligence on the Liberation Tigers of Tamil Eelam's (LTTE) whereabouts, caused the initial heli-borne assault on Jaffna University on 11 October 1987 to be a tragic failure. However, it was because of the efforts of the Para (SF) that later led to the capture of the Jaffna peninsula, forcing the LTTE militants to take refuge in the forests.

Six soldiers lost their lives in that mission. Due to their superior training, the Para (SF) took refuge under a house, after they were misled by a youth who offered his services to help the commandos track Velupillai Prabhakaran but instead took them on a wild goose chase. They engaged the enemy for 24 hours and picked up all their dead with their weapons after reinforcements arrived the next morning.

After the failed assault on Jaffna City, the 10 Para (SF) participated in a heli-borne assault on the town of Moolai 23 kilometres (14 miles) to the northwest in November 1987. More than 200 LTTE guerrillas were killed and an arms depot was seized. To give the commandos battle experience, 1 Para (SF) was rotated home in early 1988 and replaced by 9 Para (SF).

This battalion was scheduled to return home in June 1988, but the tour of duty was extended due to a planned air assault into the coastal swamps around Mullaittivu. The mission was a success, in that it located several arms caches. The 9 Para (SF) also provided 12 men for the security of the Indian High Commission in Sri Lanka.

=== Operation Cactus 1988, Maldives ===
With the capture of Maldives, an island nation off the southwestern coast of India, on 3 November 1988 by the People's Liberation Organisation of Tamil Eelam (PLOTE) mercenaries, the army turned to the 50 (Independent) Parachute Brigade to carry out an airborne/air attempt transported operation to liberate the country and return power to the legal government. This operation had 6 Para spearheading the mission. 6 Para flew in on 4 November 1988 in a fleet of IL-76, An-32 and An-12 transport aircraft. One team rescued the president, another took over the airfield, and a third rescued Maldivian security personnel besieged in the National Security Service HQ. Later 7 Para and part of 17 Para Field Regiment were also deployed to the Maldives. When mercenaries tried to escape by sea along with hostages, they were intercepted by the Indian Navy. Thus, 6 Para and the 17 Para Field Regiment conducted the first-ever international intervention by the Indian Army without any loss of life.

=== Operation Summer Storm 2009 ===
On 11 April 2009, the 57 Mountain Division of the Indian Army based in Manipur, 21 Para (SF) along with the Para-military Assam Rifles and State Police, launched a counter-insurgency operation, code-named "Operation Summer Storm" in the Loktak Lake region and adjoining Loktak Lake in Bishnupur District, located south of State capital of Imphal. The first major mobilisation of troops in 2009 ended on 21 April. As the troops began pulling out, an Army spokesperson described the operation as a success, disclosing that 129 militants, all belonging to the People's Revolutionary Party of Kangleipak (PREPAK) were killed. The Forces also claimed to have located and destroyed five militant camps during the Operation and more than 117 weapons, including sixty-nine AK-series rifles, forty-eight rocket launchers, and an unspecified quantity of explosives and improvised explosive devices (IEDs). No militant was arrested. No fatality among the Special Force (SF) personnel or civilians was reported.

=== Ongoing counter-insurgency operations in Kashmir and northeastern India ===
External image
- Para SF operators arrive to take position before a gunfight took place at a toll plaza in Nagrota, Jammu and Kashmir in January 2020. Three armed militants were reportedly killed during the gunfight.

Paratroopers and Para (SF) have conducted thousands of counter-insurgency (COIN) operations in Jammu and Kashmir, Assam, and the eastern states of India. Sometimes these units work with the Rashtriya Rifles (COIN force) in complicated operations. Since the mid-1990s, the role of Paratroopers and Para (SF) as a counter-terrorism force has increased substantially. They are now actively involved in counter-terrorist (CT) and COIN operations in Kashmir as an essential part of the Home Ministry's decision to conduct pro-active raids against militants in the countryside and mountains. Personnel includes Para (SF), Paratroopers (Airborne), and special units of the Rashtriya Rifles – a paramilitary unit created for counter-insurgency operations in Kashmir. They have also included MARCOS personnel, many of whom are seconded to the Army for CT operations.

=== Counter-terrorist operation in Samba ===
On 26 September 2013, terrorists dressed in Army fatigues stormed a police station and then an Army camp in the Jammu region killing 10 people, including an Army officer, in twin fidayeen attacks. The terrorists sneaked across the border early on Thursday, barely three days ahead of a meeting between the prime ministers of India and Pakistan. The attack was on a police station. The 16 Cavalry unit of the Army in Samba district falls under the jurisdiction of 9 corps, headquartered at Yol Cantonment in Himachal Pradesh. The three heavily armed terrorists believed to be from the group Lashkar-e-Taiba (LeT), were holed up in the cavalry armored unit's camp at Samba for several hours after they barged into the Officer's mess until they were killed during a fierce gunfight with 1 Para (SF) of the army. The bodies of the three terrorists aged between 16 and 19 were in the custody of the Army.

Authorities moved commandos of 1 Para (SF) in helicopters to the shootout site. The Para (SF) commandos first carried out an aerial reconnaissance of the camp before landing to neutralise the three terrorists. The 1 Para (SF) had identified the exact spot during the aerial reconnaissance from where the intruders were returning the army fire. After landing, the commandos started engaging the terrorists in a direct gunfight, but to give them the impression that their exact hiding location had still not been identified, an abandoned building inside the camp was blasted. This made the terrorists complacent thinking that their hiding spot had not yet been pinpointed. They kept on intermittently returning army fire until all three of them were eliminated. The entire operation, from the moment the terrorists entered the camp until they were gunned down, took nearly nine hours to complete. The main worry of the soldiers tasked to eliminate the terrorists was the Army Public School situated some distance from the place where the terrorists had been engaged in a sustained firefight. Army men were worried about the possibility of the terrorists moving into the school and taking children and staff hostage. For this reason, the operation to eliminate the terrorists was carried out with extreme caution and patience.

=== 2015 Cross Border Counter-insurgency operation in Myanmar ===
Based on precise intelligence inputs, the Indian Air Force and 21 Para (SF) carried out a cross-border operation along the Indo-Myanmar border and destroyed two militant camps one each of the National Socialist Council of Nagaland (K) (NSCN) and the Kanglei Yawol Kanna Lup (KYKL). The operations were carried out inside Myanmar, along the Nagaland and Manipur border at two locations. One of the locations was near Ukhrul in Manipur. The army attacked two militants' transit camps.

70 commandos were reportedly involved in the operation. The commandos, equipped with assault rifles, rocket launchers, grenades, and night vision goggles, were divided into two groups. The teams trekked through the thick jungles for at least 15 kilometres (9.3 miles) before they reached training camps. Each of the teams was further divided into two sub-groups. While one was responsible for the direct assault, the second formed an outer ring to prevent any of the insurgents from running and escaping. The actual operation (hitting the camp and destroying it) took about 40 minutes. Indian Air Force Mil Mi-17 helicopters were put on standby, ready to be pressed into service to evacuate the commandos in case anything went wrong. In its statement after the operation, the Indian Army said it was in communication with Myanmar and that, "There is a history of close cooperation between our two militaries. We look forward to working with them to combat such terrorism."

The Indian Army claimed to have inflicted heavy casualties (158 reported) on the attackers behind the ambush of the Army on 4 June, which claimed the lives of 18 Army jawans (soldiers) of 6 Dogra Regiment from the Chandel district of Manipur. This has been noted as the largest attack on the Indian Army after the Kargil war of 1999.

=== Surgical Strike 2016 ===
Intelligence gathering had started a few weeks prior, through drones, satellites, and various other Indian assets, on 26 September 2016, small recon teams were tasked to infiltrate across the LoC to carry out 24-hour surveillance and observation of multiple objectives and to put together an accurate terrain analysis, patterns of life on site along with the best possible avenues of approach and exfil routes through the heavily secured border. Allegedly the intelligence was strong enough to discern the names along with an accurate slant of the fidayeens at the launch pads. After the return of the recon teams, plans were laid down for the assault, and on 29 September 2016, The Paras assaulted their targeted objectives across the Line of Control (LoC), where militants congregate for their final briefings before infiltrating across the border. An Indian security source said the operation began with fire missions of Indian forces firing artillery across the frontier to suppress Pakistani positions while three to four teams of 70–80 para SF commandos from 4 and 9 Para (Special Forces) crossed the LoC at several points shortly after midnight IST on 29 September (18:30 hours UTC, 28 Sept.). Teams from 4 Para SF crossed the LoC in the Nowgam sector of Kupwara district, with teams from 9 Para SF simultaneously crossing the LoC in Poonch district.^{[2] [16]} By 2 a.m. IST, according to army sources, the special forces teams had traveled 1 km (0.62 mi) – 3 km (1.9 mi) on foot, the teams began the assault, with hand-held grenades and 84 mm recoilless rifles destroying the ammo and the fuel dumps at the launch pads. Simultaneously, the containment and assault elements opened fire, killing the terrorists on sight and those who tried to squirt from the objective. At first light, the teams swiftly returned to the Indian side of the LoC, suffering one injured, a soldier wounded after tripping on a land mine in haste.^{[2]}

The Indian army said the strike was a pre-emptive attack on the militants' bases, claiming that it had received intelligence that the militants were planning "terrorist strikes" against India.^{[36] [37]} India said that in destroying "terrorist infrastructure" it also attacked "those who are trying to support them," indicating it also attacked Pakistani soldiers.^{[48]} India later briefed opposition parties and foreign envoys, but did not disclose operational details.^{[16]} The footage from the strike captured by overhead drones and thermal imaging was released to the media afterward. It was also informed that around 40-50 militants were killed and many more injured in one of the surgical strikes. However, the Pakistan army dismissed India's claim and instead claimed that Indian troops had not crossed the LoC but had only skirmished with Pakistani troops at the border, resulting in the deaths of two Pakistani soldiers and the wounding of nine.

=== 2020 India-China border tensions ===
The Para SF reportedly conducted reconnaissance against Chinese military posts near the Pangong Tso during the 2020 China–India skirmishes. They participated alongside the Special Frontier Force in occupying dominating positions of 'Blacktop', 'Gurung hill', 'Helmet', and various other peaks and ridges on the southern bank of Pangong Tso, west of the Kailash Range in August 2020.

=== Operation Mahadev ===
On July 28, 2025, Para SF killed three terrorists, namely Suleman Shah alias Hashim Moosa from Lashkar-e-Taiba, who was also a former member of Pakistan's Special Service Group and was linked to Pahalgam attack, Abu Hamza and Yasir, after coordinating intelligence efforts in the Harwan jungles close to Dachigam. It was a communication device, presumably a Huawei satellite phone that had been monitored since 22 April 2025, that helped tracking down the terrorists. Red flags were raised in the security grid on July 26 when this device made an unusual call.

== Organisation ==
The Parachute Regiment presently has fifteen Special Forces, one Counter Insurgency (Rashtriya Rifles) battalion and in its fold. Due to personnel the absence of centralized command and lack of a standardized process for selection procedures vary among the Para (SF) battalions. There is a variety of pipelines to get into different Para (SF) battalions. In the mid-1980s, there were plans to merge triple para commando battalions from the Parachute Regiment under a unique organization which is known as the Special Forces Regiment. However, due to several administrative and logistical obstacles, these plans were abandoned. The Parachute Regiment continues to train and recruit them. Para (SF) operates in assault teams, which work individually behind enemy lines. The total strength of the Parachute Regiment stands from 8,000 to 10,000 which includes one Rashtriya Rifles personnel and two Territorial Army battalions, while the Para (SF) includes between 5,000 and 6,000 personnel or maybe more. They have to hide their operational history unless declassified and their credentials from the general public during active service. 1 PARA SF Battalion operates under the Armed Forces Special Operations Division.

The Special Group (aka 4 Vikas/22 SF/22 SG), a clandestine special forces unit which operates under Research and Analysis Wing, are recruited from the Para Special Forces, Garud Commando Force and MARCOS. Currently, the Para Special Forces consists of 15 battalions with each battalion consisting of 620 soldiers:

- 1 PARA (SF) – Western Command
- 2 PARA (SF) – Central Command
- 3 PARA (SF) – South Western Command
- 4 PARA (SF) – Northern Command
- 5 PARA (SF) – 50(I) Para Brigade
- 6 PARA (SF) – 50(I) Para Brigade
- 7 PARA (SF) – 50(I) Para Brigade
- 9 PARA (SF) – Northern Command
- 10 PARA (SF) – Southern Command
- 11 PARA (SF) – Eastern Command
- 12 PARA (SF) – Eastern Command
- 13 PARA (SF) – Southern Command
- 21 PARA (SF) – Eastern Command
- 23 PARA (SF) – 50(I) Para Brigade
- 29 PARA (SF) – 50(I) Para Brigade

=== Functions ===
- Covert/direct action special operational elements of the Indian Army's counter-insurgency and counter-terrorism operations.
- Intelligence gathering and special reconnaissance.
- Hostage rescue operations within and beyond the Indian territories.
- Sabotage of opponent's vital communication and infrastructure networks through covert penetration and surgical strikes behind enemy lines.

The unit is tasked with various missions such as special operations, direct action, hostage rescue, counter-terrorism, special reconnaissance, foreign internal defense, counter-proliferation, counter-insurgency, search and destroy, and personnel recovery.

== Personnel ==
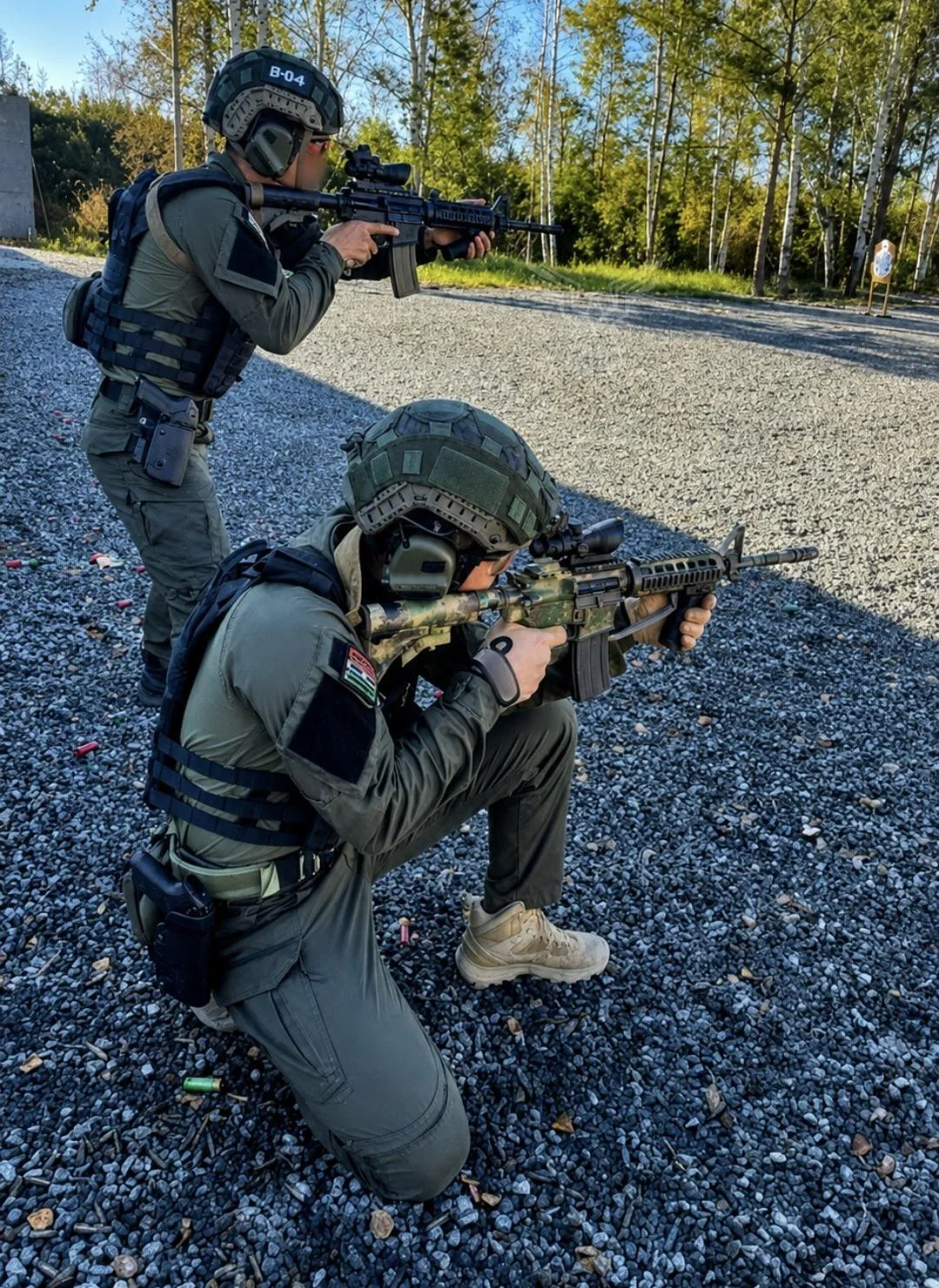
Indian Army’s PARA SF during Vyzov 7 Competition in Yekaterinburg, Russia 2026.

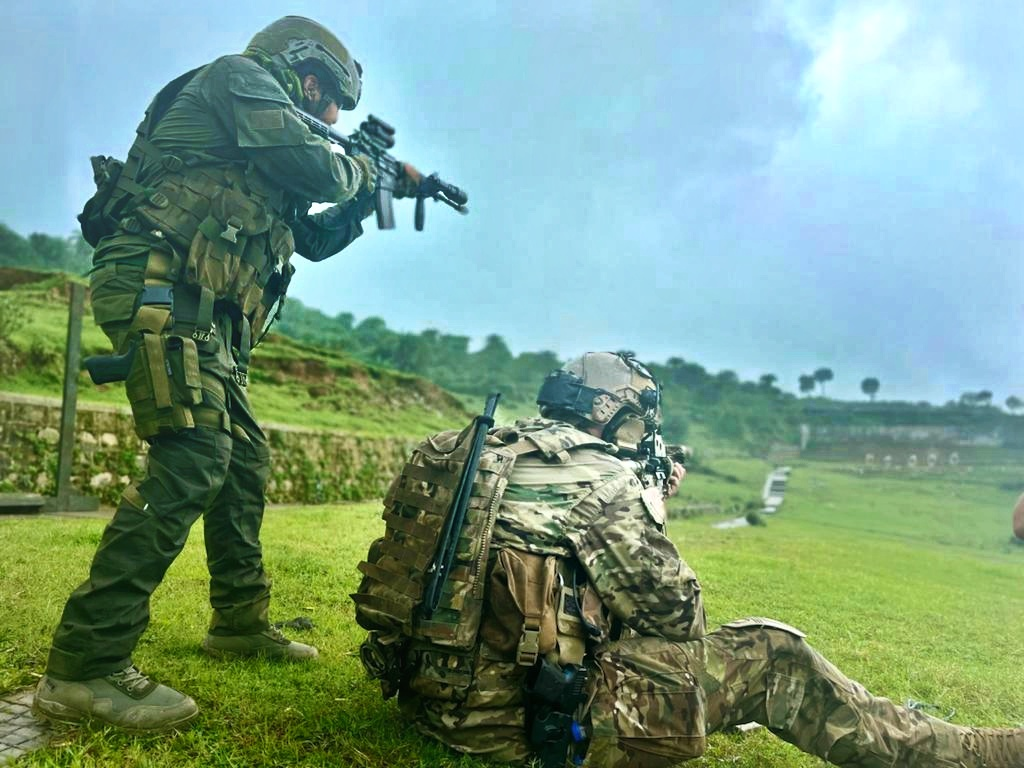
Indian Para SF (in Ranger Green uniform) and US Army Special Forces during exercise Vajra Prahar, 2022

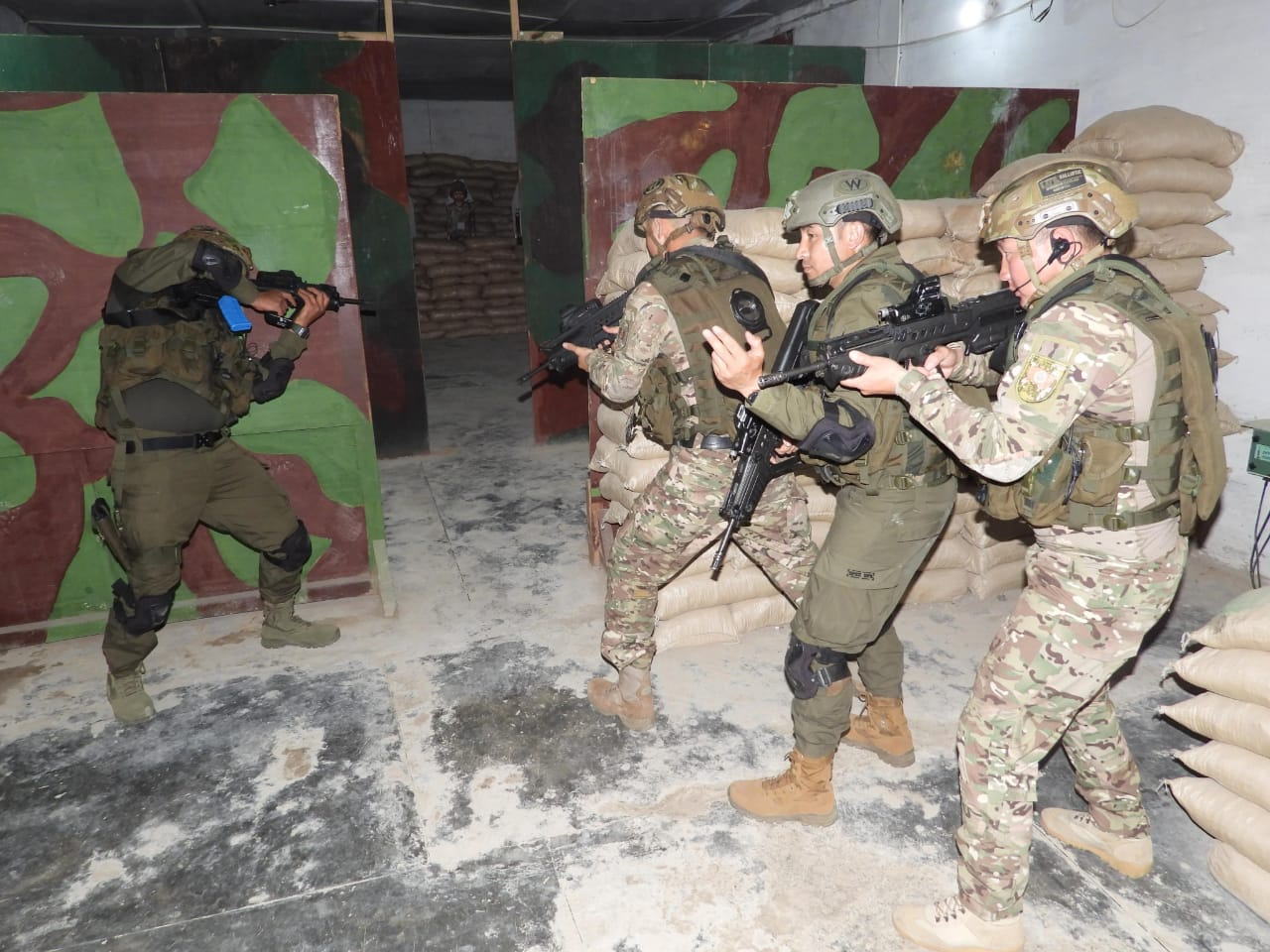
Para SF (in Ranger Green uniform) during the 9th edition of India-Kyrgyzstan joint Special Forces (SF) exercise

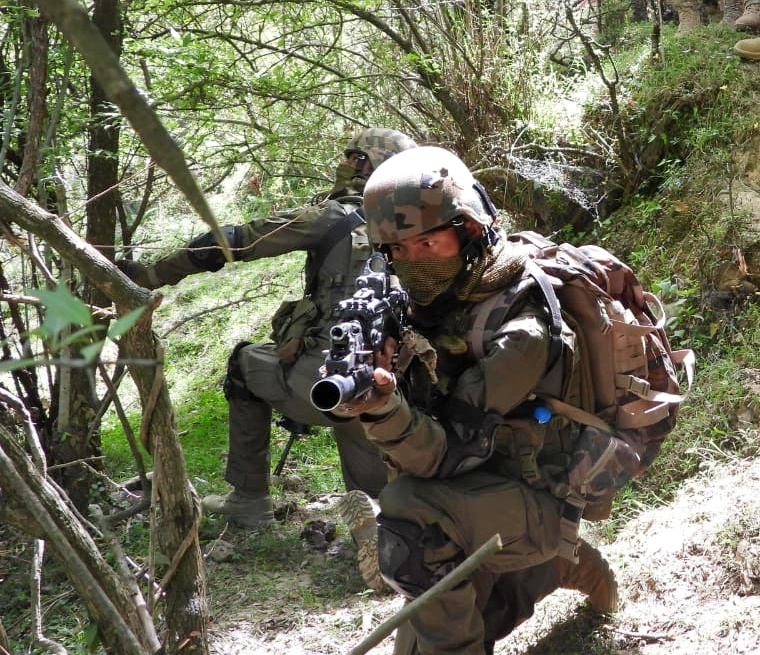
Para SF operator during India-Kyrgyzstan joint Special Forces (SF) exercise Khanjar-IX, 2022

=== Selection ===
All Indian army personnel are designated as volunteers for induction into special forces. Some enter the para regiments as rookies from recruitment, while others transfer from regular army units. In Parachute training, the probationers must complete a 3-week Basic Parachute Course at the Indian Army's Parachute Training School in Agra. They are put through a three months probationary period/selection for Para S.F (Special Forces) battalions. To be a Para S.F operator, the army personnel are primarily required to qualify as Paratroopers; once selected, they may choose to advance for the Para SF selection, which takes place during the spring and the autumn seasons twice a year. There are fifteen Para (SF) battalions and soldiers are selected accordingly. An example of this would be the 10 Para (SF) which are also known as Desert Scorpions. The probation period for this unit is three-months and the probationers are selected accordingly for desert warfare. The 9 Para (SF) who specialise in mountain warfare go through a six-month course at the Special Forces training school in Nahan, Himachal Pradesh, which is followed by further specialised selection and training. This concept of geographical specialisation was eventually modified and each Para (SF) battalions are trained to operate in different climatic conditions and various terrains.

Indian Army soldiers can volunteer for the course irrespective of their ranks. Depending on the battalion, the probation period is for three months which doesn't include additional time for specialised skills. When the probation period starts, all soldiers including officers are stripped of their ranks, who are known as probationers or probies. A probationer may opt to leave anytime during the course. The achievement rate will be 12-15 percent and above, because many probationers are drawn from their regimental battalions. Every Special Forces operator specialises in various skills such as weapons handling communication, demolition, medical procedures and navigation. PARA (SF) usually works in small teams of only six men, focusing on reconnaissance, surveillance, target designation (RSTAD), hostage rescue, and direct action tasks. Those who complete the probation period and are inducted into the Para (SF) for undergoing further selection and training stages, but to earn the Balidan Badge or "Badge of sacrifice", they should survive further training procedures, before being deployed in active operations at hostile zones.

==== Training centres and courses ====
- Basic Combat Divers Course, Indian Navy's Diving School, Kochi
- Basic Parachuting and Combat free-fall training (HAHO & HALO) at the Army Airborne Training School & Parachute Training School (Agra)
- Commando Training Wing, Belgavi, Karnataka
- Counter insurgency based courses, at the Counter Insurgency and Jungle Warfare School (CIJWS) in Vairengte, Mizoram
- Desert Warfare School, Rajasthan
- 4-week High-Altitude Commando Course, Parvat Ghatak School in Tawang, Arunachal Pradesh
- High Altitude Warfare School (HAWS), Sonamarg, Kashmir
- Special Forces Training School, Bakloh, Himachal Pradesh

==== 90-day selection and training ====
Some of the training during the 90-day selection process includes:

- Day 1 to 35: The first 35 days consists of 'Physical and Skills Training'. This includes hours of rigorous exercises apart from other tests and skills training such as blindfolded team assembly, cooking skills, communication, demolition, medical procedures, navigation, survival skills and weapons training. Probationers are also taught animal handling skills, they'll go without food and water for four days, they have to minimise their water consumption by up to 1-litre for three days and they should go without sleep for seven days. A 10 kg sandbag becomes a permanent buddy for the probationer. Routine speed marches and running from 10 km to 40 km with full battle gears are conducted. Probationers must be exceptional navigators in areas where there will be no cellular network signal, no landmarks or roads, and the dunes that keep shifting every night. Insertion and extraction techniques will include learning to communicate some foreign languages. Most of the probationers are not able to complete this phase in the course itself, as the attrition rate is 20% and above.
- Day 45: The 36-hour Para SF stress test phase includes 36 hours of exercises, maneuvers, insertion, and extraction where the probationer's stress capabilities are put to the test. It starts with a 10 km speed march with 30 kg battle loads and an additional 40 kg each. This is followed by various exercises including lifting buddies over long periods. This is followed by weight shifting. Weight shifting has three rounds, where various kinds of weights should be shifted such as 40 liters of jerry cans, tire trucks, and wooden logs which weigh up to 85 kg. During the 11th hour, trial by water is conducted – simulated drowning, allowing only to bare the minimum oxygen over a long period. This is to test the probationers' panic reactions under stress. Later on, their hands will be tied by using ropes for being pulled underwater. It is well known that hypoxia and blackout due to lack of oxygen are common during this test. The first 16 hours are completed without a drop of water or food. This is followed by immediate observational skills and operation tactics under pressure which included probationary having to recall objects placed in their exercises. This is followed by 10 km speed march and 6 hours of continuous exercises. Finally, practical combat skills were tested such as placing ambushes, responding to an ambush, making camps, stretchers, and simulated evacs. This is all done at the last stage of the stress test under lack of sleep and extreme fatigue mainly to test the mental endurance of the probationers under such conditions and how they react. The 36-hour stress test also monitors probationers leaving the training process.
- Day 56: The Para SF 100 km endurance run is a must for all probationers. With a 10 kg battle load and a personal weapon of 7 kg they have to run 100 km. The time consumption ranges from 13 to 15 hours. A known route the Para SF has used for this run is the hilly route between Rampur and Dakkal. The run is divided into four stages.
- Day 60 to 90: Those who make it to this stage is the Counter Terrorism Operations phase, which is the final and toughest test phase. All the tasks in this course are classified. After completing the 90-day probation period, successful candidates will receive and wear their maroon berets and go through a glass-eating tradition.

=== Training ===
The training in SF battalions is a continuous process. In the special forces, the members are imparted both basic and advanced training. They are taught specialized modes of infiltration and exfiltration, either by air (combat freefall) or sea (combat diving). Some trainees return to PTS to undergo the free-fall course, which requires at least 50 jumps from altitudes up to 33,500 feet (10,200 metres) to pass. Both High Altitude Low Opening (HALO) and High-Altitude High Opening (HAHO) techniques are learned. The ability to use the HAHO method and specially designed maneuverable parachutes called HAPPS (High Altitude Parachute Penetration System)/AMX-310 to conduct stealth insertions over distances up to 50 kilometres (31 mi) is also perfected.

The commandos are sent to the Naval Diving School, Kochi for combat diving training. Like other special forces, these SF operators are trained for land, air, and water. The daily routine begins with a 20 km (12 mi) morning run. Infiltration, exfiltration, combat patrolling, Urban Warfare, intelligence gathering, ambush tactics, counter-ambush tactics, counter-insurgency, unconventional warfare, guerilla warfare, asymmetric warfare, raids and sabotage, basic martial arts training, tactical shooting, combat marksmanship, buddy system drills, Close Quarter Battle tactics, tactical driving, advanced weapon courses and handling, demolition training, survival skills, linguistics training, logistics training, trade-craft training is imparted by the intelligence agencies. The training drills involve live ammunition at all times which is a reason for fatal accidents at times leading to death. Night and weapons training and field craft involving 20 km (12 mi) treks with 60 kg (130 lb) loads and live ammunition are conducted. Weekly forced marches with 65 kg (143 lb) combat loads with distances over 80 km (50 mi) to 130 km (81 mi) and quarterly night drops with full combat loads are also conducted.

In addition to this in-house training, the commandos also attend several schools run by the Army that specialize in warfare over varying types of terrain and specialisations. These include the Junior Leaders' Commando Training Camp in Belgaum, Karnataka, the Parvat Ghatak School (for high altitude mountain warfare) in Tawang Arunachal Pradesh, the desert warfare school in Rajasthan, the High Altitude Warfare School (HAWS) in Sonamarg, Kashmir, the Counterinsurgency and Jungle Warfare School (CIJWS) in Vairengte, Mizoram, and the Indian special forces training school in Nahan, Himachal Pradesh. These schools are among the finest of their kind anywhere and routinely host foreign students.

Members of USSOCOM (United States Special Operations Command) and UKSF (United Kingdom Special Forces) have conducted joint training exercises with the Indian Paras. SOF members from the three nations routinely train at each other's facilities to improve military cooperation and tactical skills. This allows the SOF operators from each nation to see tactics and perspectives offered by other top-notch organisations. It is thought that the French Foreign Legion also has approached CIJWS regarding the courses taught by them. Para SF troops can also undergo a complete Combat Divers course, after which they earn a combat diver badge. They are also experienced in conducting SHBO (special heliborne operations) and typically employ Cheetahs, MI-8/MI-17, or HAL (Dhruv) helicopters for this purpose.

=== Joint exercises with other nations ===
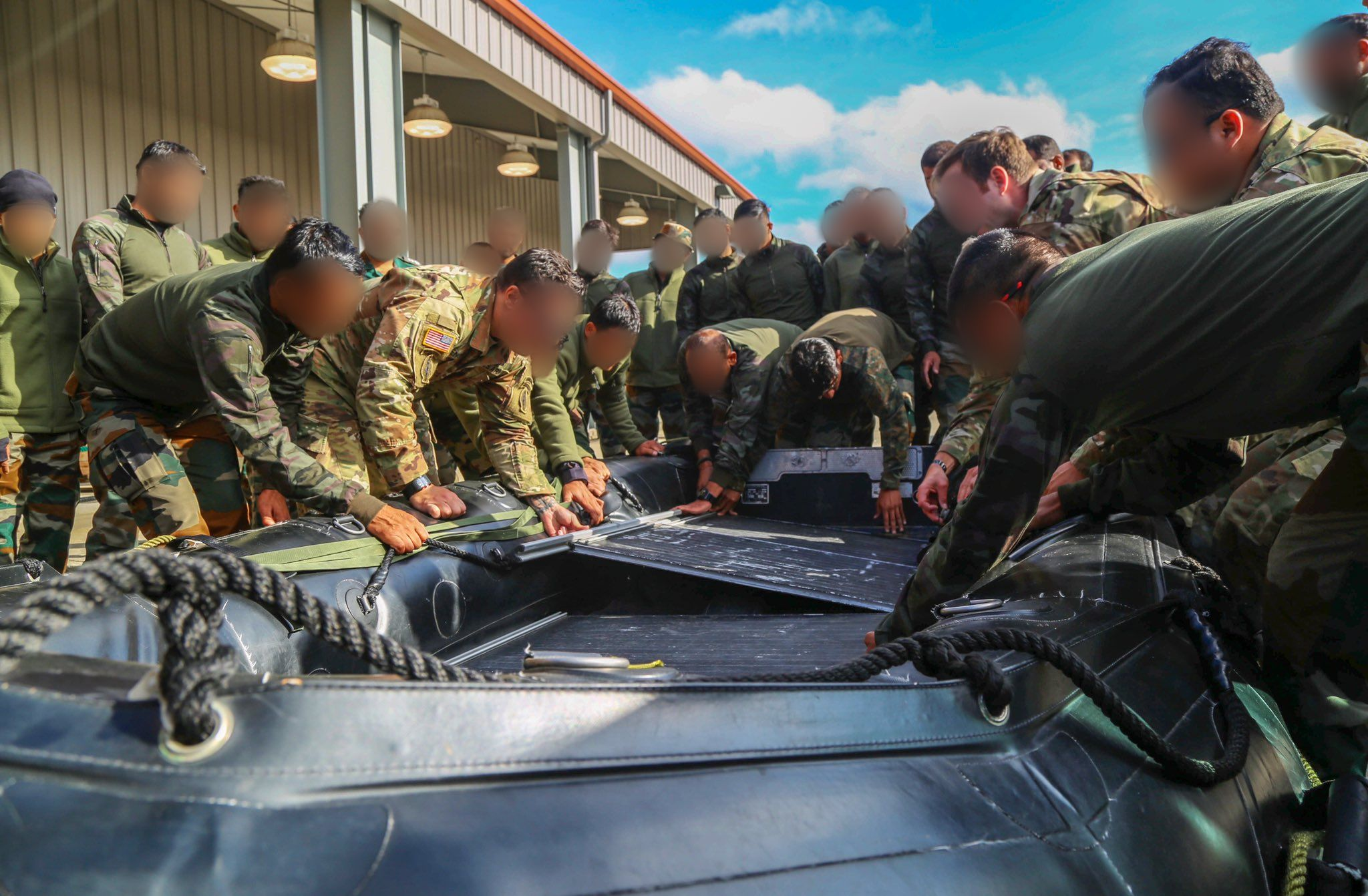
Para SF with US special forces during Vajraprahar 2019

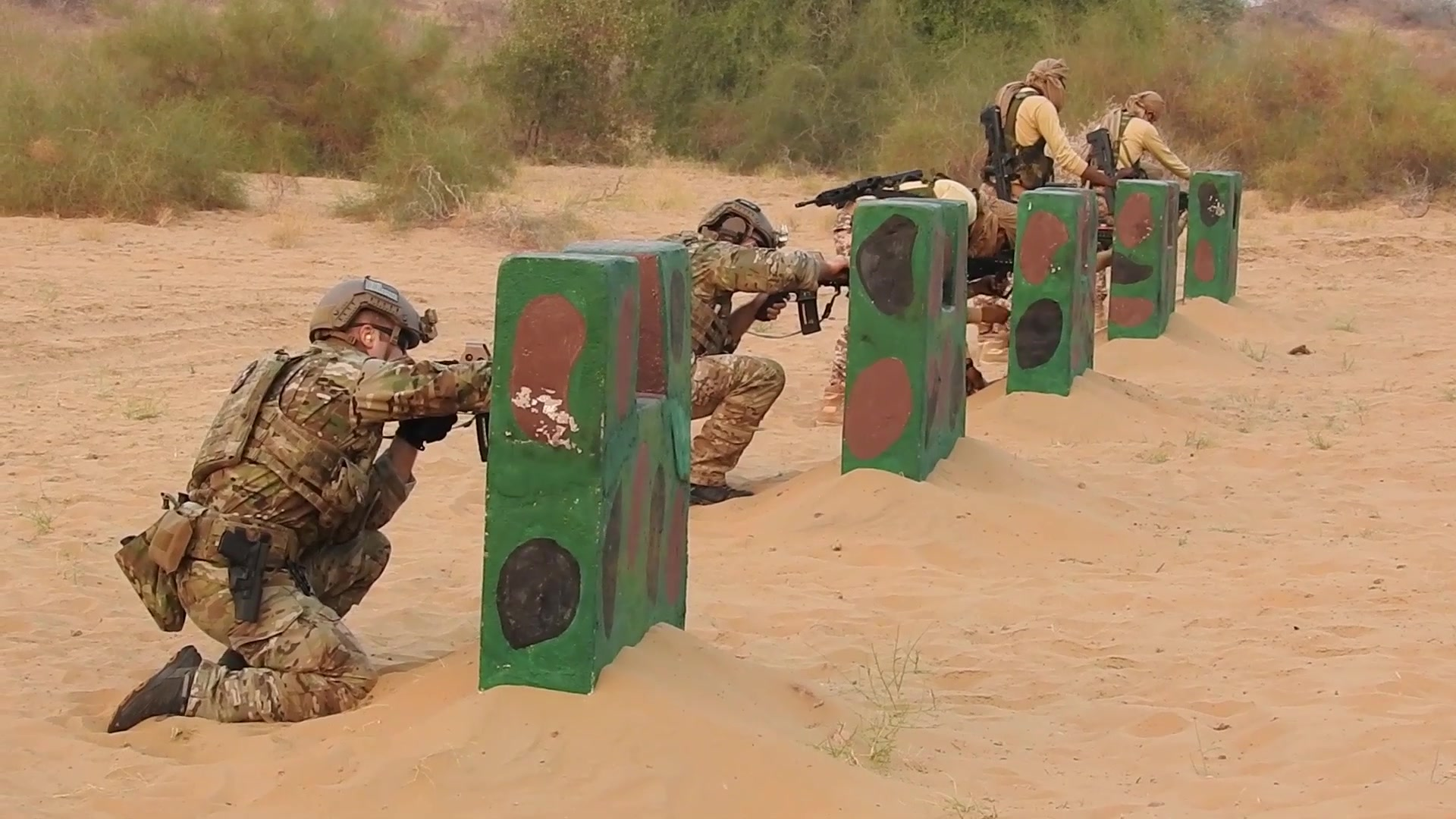
Para SF train alongside US special forces during Vajra Prahar 2018

The Para (SF) conducts a series of joint exercises, named Vajra Prahar, with the United States Army every year, in which about 100 personnel from the US and Indian special forces participate. INDRA is a series of joint exercises with Russian special forces, and operation Sampriti is the name for joint exercises with Bangladeshi special forces. Para (SF) also conducts exercises and training with the special forces of Israel. The Ajeya Warrior is a series of exercises with the SFSG of the UK. Indian special forces also conduct exercises with forces of the following 16 countries: the United States, France, the UK, Russia, Mongolia, Kazakhstan, Uzbekistan, Kyrgyzstan, Bangladesh, Myanmar, Nepal, Maldives, Seychelles, Singapore, Indonesia and Thailand.

=== Global competitions ===
Personnel from the Para (SF) have participated in international competitions like Airborne Africa, Cambrian Patrol. This exercise was designed to test the special forces community's endurance, combat efficiency, and combat readiness. The regiment has a record for the highest tally of wins in both these exercises that is hosted annually ever since their participation was inducted in the competition hosted by Botswana in Africa's Kalahari Desert from 8–10 June 2002, in which 10 Para (SF) participated. Special forces from other nations like the Special Air Service of the UK and the Green Berets of the US also participated.

In 2014 and 2021 teams from the Indian army won the gold medal out of the 140 teams that participated in Exercise Cambrian Patrol held in the UK.

=== Influence on foreign military units ===
The Para SF has provided training to special forces from Afghanistan and Tajikistan. In December 2013, 60 Afghan special forces were trained by the 10 Para (SF) at the Thar Desert. A month earlier, the Tajik special forces had undergone training. In 2021, Uzbek airborne forces were also trained in specialized para operations.

== Equipment ==
The following equipment is reportedly used by the Para (SF):

Small Arms

Pistol

- Beretta 92FS Semi-automatic Pistol
- Beretta Px4 Storm Semi-automatic Pistol
- Pistol 9mm 1-A Semi-automatic Pistol
- Glock Semi-automatic Pistol
- IWI Masada Semi-automatic Pistol
- IWI Jericho 941 Semi-automatic Pistol

Sub-machine Gun

- B&T MP9 9mm Machine Pistol
- ASMI Machine Pistol
- Heckler & Koch MP5 Sub-Machine Gun
- Micro Uzi 9mm Sub-Machine Gun

Assault Rifle

- M4A1 SOPMOD BLOCK 1 5.56mm Carbine
- IWI TAR-21 Tavor 5.56mm Assault Rifle
- IWI Arad 5.56×45mm Assault Rifle
- AK-47 (SOPMOD) 7.62×39mm Assault Rifle
- SIG Sauer 716i 7.62mm Battle Rifle
- IMI Galil SAR 5.56mm Assault Rifle
- AK 103 7.62mm Assault Rifle

Sniper Rifle

- IWI Galil Sniper 7.62mm Semi-automatic sniper Rifle
- Sako TRG .338 Lapua Magnum Sniper Rifle
- Barrett M107A1 Anti-material Sniper Rifle
- SVD Dragunov designated marksman rifle
- Beretta Victrix Scorpio TGT .338 Lapua Magnum Sniper Rifle

Machine Gun

- IWI Negev NG-7 Light Machine Gun
- PKM General Purpose Machine Gun
- MK48 General Purpose Machine Gun

Rocket Launcher

- C-90-CR-RB (M3) Rocket Propelled Grenade.
- RL MkIII 84mm Recoilless Rifle
- Carl Gustaf recoilless rifle(Mark-4) Light Weight Recoilless Rifle.
- B-300 Shipon 82mm Rocket launcher
- Spike (ATGM) Anti-Tank Guided Missile

=== Transportation ===
- C-130J Super Hercules tactical transport aircraft.
- Boeing C-17 Globemaster III transport aircraft.
- HAL Dhruv utility helicopter.
- Mil Mi 17 Troop transport helicopter
- AH-64E Apache Attack helicopter
- All-terrain vehicle All-Terrain Vehicles
- SHERP ATV 4X4 Tactical Offroad Troop Carrier

== Insignia ==
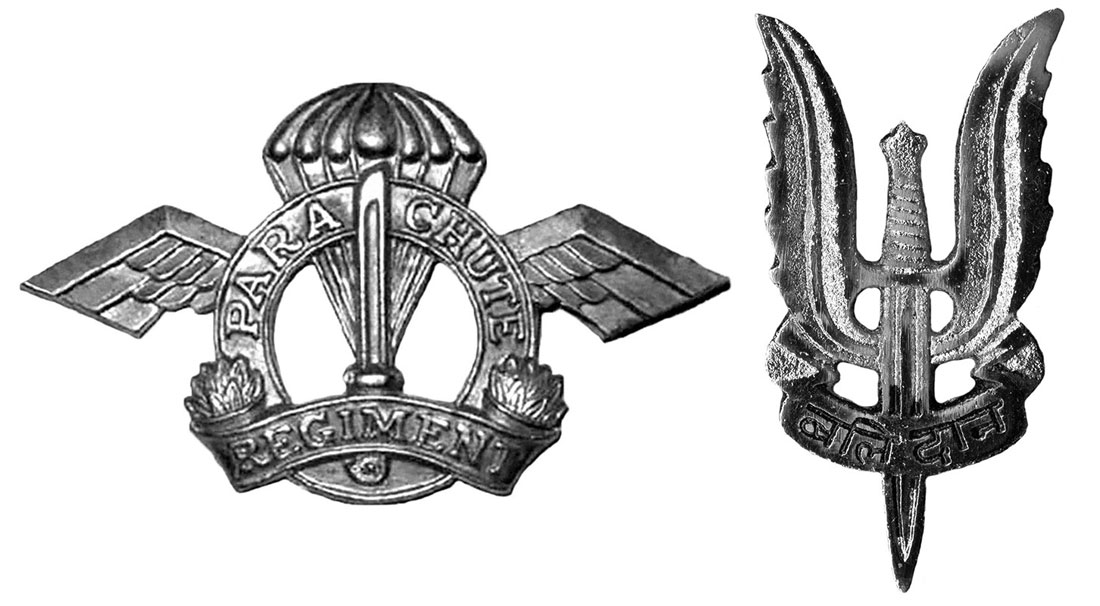

Like other parachute troopers in the Indian military, the Para special forces personnel will wear a maroon beret after they clear the Paratrooper Air diving course during the initial stages of probation. Their beret insignia is the same as what paratroopers of regular para battalions wear.

The key factor that separates Para (SF) personnel from Paratroopers, apart from their doctrine, training & task, is that the former wear Special Forces tab on each shoulder and the Balidan Badge, translated as "Badge of Sacrifice", on their right pocket below the nameplate. Only the Special Forces personnel are allowed to wear these insignias after completing the SF training and a certain number of successful combat ops. The badge is modeled after that of the UK Special Air Service. Para SF personnel are allowed to grow beard, mustache and hair which allows them to blend in with the civilian population, especially in the terrorism-plagued areas at Jammu and Kashmir.

== Gallantry awards ==
=== Ashok Chakra ===
- 1995, (Posthumous) Captain Arun Singh Jasrotia, SM of 9 PARA (Commando) for eliminating terrorists in Lolab Valley during operation Rakshak.
- 1999, (Posthumous) Major Sudhir Kumar Walia, SM* of 9 PARA (Commando) for killing 9 terrorists single-handedly during operation Rakshak in Haphruda forest of Kashmir.
- 2003, (Posthumous) Paratrooper Sanjog Chhetri of 9 PARA (Special Forces) for operation Sarp Vinash in Poonch.
- 2007, (Posthumous) Captain Harshan R Nair of the 2 PARA (Special Forces) for Baramulla Operation, 20th Mar 2007, eliminating four terrorists including, two top leaders.
- 2008, (Posthumous) Havaldar Bahadur Singh Bohra of 10 PARA (Special Force) for counter-insurgency operations in Jammu and Kashmir in 2008.
- 2008, (Posthumous) Havaldar Gajender Singh Bisht of 10 PARA (Special Forces) on deputation to 51 NSG for anti-terror operations in 26/11 Mumbai attack in 2008.
- 2009, (Posthumous) Major Mohit Sharma of 1 PARA (Special Forces) for counter-insurgency operations in Jammu and Kashmir in 2009.
- 2015, (Posthumous) Lance Naik Mohan Nath Goswami of 9 PARA (Special Forces) for counter-insurgency operations in Jammu and Kashmir in 2016.

=== Maha Vir Chakra ===
- 1965, Lt. General (then Major) Ranjit Singh Dyal of 1 Para captured Haji pir pass under Operation Bakshi of the 1965 war.
- 1971, Brigadier (then Lt Colonel) Bhawani Singh of 10 Para (Commando) for the capture of large areas of Chachro and Virawah in Pakistan during 1971 war.
- 1971 Maj Gen (Then Lt Col) Kulwant Singh Pannu of 2 Para who led the Airborne Assault on Poongli Bridge, in Tangail, and subsequently led the Indian Army's entry into Dhaka with his unit.
- 1965, Brigadier (then Lt Colonel) Russell Lazarus of the 3 Para for action in the 1965 War.
- 1971, Brigadier (then Maj) Vijay Kumar Berry of 4 Para (Commando) while fighting in Battle of Nagi in the 1965 war.

=== Kirti Chakra ===
- 1994, Maj Gen (then Lt Col) SK Razdan of 7 Para for Counter-insurgency operation Op Rhino in 1994.
- 2001,(Posthumous) Capt. R. Subramanian of 1 Para(Special Forces) for counter-insurgency operations in Kupwara area of Jammu and Kashmir in 2000
- 2009, Brig.(then Lt. Colonel) Saurabh Singh Shekhawat of 21 Para(Special Forces) for a classified operation in Manipur in 2008.
- 2010,(Posthumous) Capt. Davinder Singh Jass, of 1 Para (Special Forces) for counter-insurgency operations in Sopore area of Jammu and Kashmir in 2010
- 2011, Lt Col Vikas Sharma (Then Lieutenant)of 6 PARA(Special Forces)for Counter-insurgency operation in Jammu & Kashmir in 2011.
- 2015, Colonel (then Lt. Colonel) Nectar Sanjenbam of 21 Para(Special Forces) for 2015 Myanmar Cross Border Raid.
- 2015, Captain (Now Lieutenant Colonel)Jaidev Dangi of 10 Para (Special Forces) for eliminating a terrorist in Pulwama in 2014.
- 2017, Colonel.(then Major) Rohit Suri of 4 Para(Special Forces) for the Surgical strike against terrorist launch pads across the Line of Control in Pakistani-administered Kashmir in 2016.
- 2021, (Posthumous) Sub. Sanjiv Kumar of 4 Para(Special Forces) for Counter Insurgency Op in Kupwara, Kashmir in 2020.
- 2009, (Posthumous) Paratrooper Shabir Ahmad Malik of 1 Para SF for fighting terrorists at Kupwara, Kashmir on 21 March 2009.
- 2023, (Posthumous) Havildar Abdul Majid of 9 Para SF laid down his life in December 2023 while fighting terrorist in Kupwara, Kashmir.
- 2023, Maj Digvijay Singh Rawat of 21 Para SF for multiple cross border operation in the North Eastern States

=== Vir Chakra ===
- 1988, Maj. General (then Lt. Colonel) Dalvir Singh, of 10 Para (Commando) for the rescue of 74 personnel as well as the infantry personnel trapped, along with recovery of 6 para casualties during the Operation Jaffna University Helidrop in 1987.
- 1999, Brigadier (then Capt) B.M. Carriappa, SM of 5 Para (Commando) managed to capture one of the difficult features in the Battalik sector of Kargil in Operation Vijay.

=== Shaurya Chakra ===
- 1985, Lt. General (then Major) Prakash Chand Katoch of 1 Para(Special Forces) for Operation Blue Star, in 1984.
- 1996, Maj. Kaluvakolan Bhushan of 9 Para (Special Forces) for Counter-Insurgency Operation in Jammu and Kashmir.
- 1998, Col (then 2/Lt) Paramjeet Singh Bajwa of 6 Para (Special Forces) for Counter-Insurgency Operation in Jammu & Kashmir.
- 1998,(Posthumous) Ptr, Baldev Raj of 6 Para (Special Forces) for Counter-Insurgency Operation in Jammu & Kashmir which resulted in the killing of 9 militants.
- 1999,(Posthumous) Ptr, Gian Singh of 6 Para (Special Forces) for Counter-Insurgency Operation in Jammu & Kashmir.
- 2002, Col (then Lt) Manav Yadav of 1 Para(Special Forces) for Counter-Insurgency Operation in Kashmir.
- 2004, (Posthumous) Major Udai Singh of 1 Para(Special Forces) for Rajouri operation in 2003.
- 2007, Col. (then Capt.) Kaushal Kashyap of 21 Para (Special Forces) for operation against militants in North East.
- 2008, Colonel. (then Major) N. S. Bal of 2 Para(Special Forces) for a covert operation in Lolab Valley in 2008.
- 2010, Capt Tushar Dhasmana of 6 Para (Special Forces)for Counter-Insurgency Operation in Jammu & Kashmir.
- 2014, Lt. Col (then Lieutenant) Manish Singh of 9 Para(Special Forces) for Operation in Kashmir in 2012.
- 2016, (Posthumous) Captain Pawan Kumar of 10 Para(Special Forces) for 2016 Pampore stand-off.
- 2016, (Posthumous) Captain Tushar Mahajan of 9 Para(Special Forces) for 2016 Pampore stand-off.
- 2017, Major D. K. Upadhyay of 9 Para(Special Forces) for 2016 Surgical Strike in Pakistan
- 2017, Major Rajat Chandra of 4 Para(Special Forces) for 2016 Surgical Strike in Pakistan
- 2017, Captain Ashutosh Kumar of 4 Para(Special Forces) for 2016 Surgical Strike in Pakistan
- 2017, Nb. Subedar Vijay Kumar of 4 Para(Special Forces) for 2016 Surgical Strike in Pakistan
- 2017, Ptr. Abdul Qayum of 9 Para(Special Forces) for 2016 Surgical Strike in Pakistan
- 2018, Col(then Lt. Col) Vikrant Prashar of 10 Para(Special Forces) for a covert operation in Kashmir, 2018.
- 2019, Nb. Subedar Anil Kumar Dahiya of 1 Para(Special Forces) for killing 3 terrorists, during a covert strike across the Line of Control in 2018.
- 2021, Ptr. Sonam Tshering Tamang of 4 Para(Special Forces) for killing 2 terrorists and for evacuating his squad commander, in 2020.
- 2015, Col Santosh Mahadik, SM ‘Commanding Officer’ of 41 RR (on deputation) laid down his life while fighting terrorist in Kupwara sector of Jammu and Kashmir.

=== Sena Medal ===
- 2024, Captain Shubham Gupta (IC-84541K) of the Indian Army's elite 9 Para (Special Forces) was posthumously awarded the Sena Medal (Gallantry) for his extraordinary courage and leadership during a counter-terrorism operation.

== See also ==
- Special Forces of India
- MARCOS
- Garud Commando Force
- National Security Guard
- Special Air Service
- Special Boat Service
- Parachute Regiment
- United States Navy SEALs
- R&AW

== Bibliography ==
- Gen. P. C. Katoch, Saikat Datta (2013). India's Special Forces: 1: History and Future of Special Forces. VIJ Books (India) Pty Ltd. ISBN 9789382573975
- Col V S Yadav. (2012) Employment of Special Forces: Challenges and Opportunities for the Future. Centre for Joint Warfare Studies (New Delhi). ISBN 9789381411698
