= ASMI =

Asmi
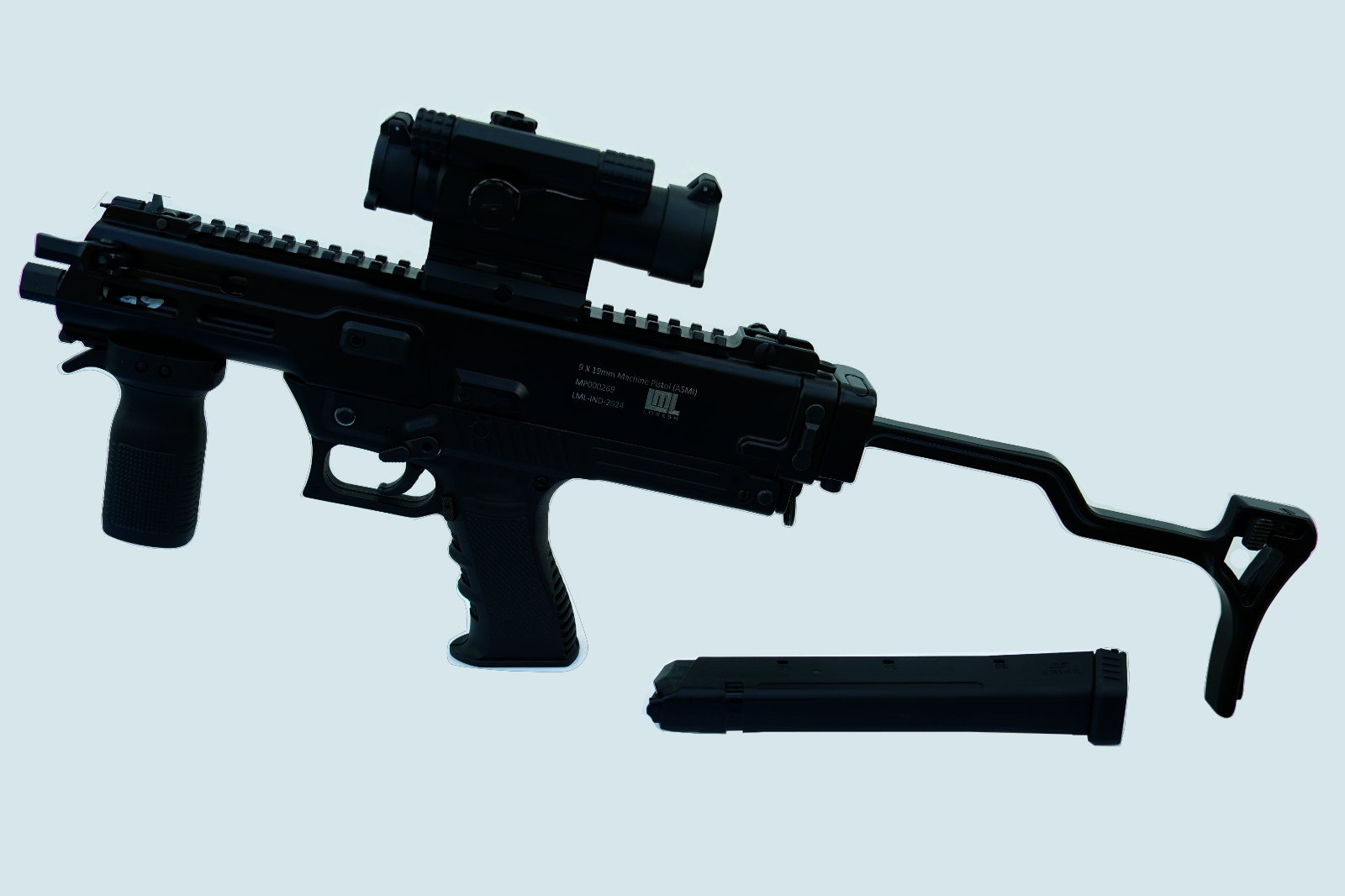
- Asmi 9mm submachine gun
- Type: Submachine gun Machine pistol
- Place of origin: India

Service history
- In service: 2024-present

Production history
- Designer: Lt. Colonel Prasad Bansod
- Designed: 2020
- Manufacturer: Lokesh Machines Limited
- Unit cost: est. ₹50,000 (US$520)
- Produced: August 2024 - present
- No. built: 570

Specifications
- Mass: 1.7–2 kg (3.75–4.41 lb) (empty)
- Length: 382 mm (stock folded); 612 mm (stock extended)
- Barrel length: 7.2-inch (180 mm); 6.5-inch (170 mm)
- Cartridge: 9×19mm Parabellum
- Action: Straight blowback
- Rate of fire: 600 rounds/min
- Effective firing range: 100 m
- Feed system: 33 round Glock magazine
- Sights: Reflex sight

The ASMI, short for Asmita (lit. 'pride, self respect and hard work'), is an Indian submachine gun designed and developed in 2020 by the Armament Research and Development Establishment.

The ASMI was designed as a replacement for the 1A Carbine, India's domestically produced copy of the Sterling submachine gun, which has been in service since the 1960s. Alongside the 1A, India is also somewhat reliant on imported submachine guns, such as the Brügger & Thomet MP9, Heckler & Koch MP5 and Uzi. It will serve as a cheaper alternative to imports, with an Asmi costing only a third as much as an MP5.

== History ==
In the 2000s, the DRDO developed the Modern Sub Machine Carbine to attempt to replace the 1A, but it failed to meet the military's requirements. The ASMI was showcased at the 7th edition of the International Police Expo in New Delhi on 6 July 2022 and DEFEXPO 2022.

The ASMI was developed over the course of four months by Lieutenant Colonel Prasad Bansod, who had previous experience reverse engineering an INSAS rifle to produce a bullpup carbine variant.

=== Adoption ===
In April 2024, Lokesh Machines has emerged as the L1 contender, beating the likes of PLR Systems and Jindal Defence, to clinch a contract to supply 550 9×19mm ASMI Submachine Pistols to the Para (Special Forces) of the Indian Army.

The per unit cost of the gun is around ₹50,000 (US$520). The contract worth ₹4.6 crore (US$480,000) is particularly significant as it marks the first order for an indigenous small arm after the INSAS rifle.

The entire 550 guns were delivered to the Indian Army by 1 October 2024. The consignment was flagged off by Major General Rakesh Manocha, General Officer Commanding of the Telangana and Andhra sub-area.

On 12 February 2026, the Assam Rifles placed an order for 1,013 ASMI carbines after the bid of Lokesh Machines emerged as the lowest during techno-commercial evaluation.

== Design ==
Unlike its predecessor, the Modern Sub Machine Carbine, the ASMI is chambered in 9×19mm Parabellum, a cartridge already in use in the Indian Army, giving it a major logistical advantage over the MSMC, whose round was purpose built for the design.

Similar to the Uzi, the Asmi is a straight blowback submachine gun with a side-folding stock, a low rate of fire, and its magazine is loaded inside of the pistol grip. The ASMI has two barrel configurations: 7.2-inch (180 mm) and 6.5-inch (170 mm) barrel, and has a weight of around 2 kilograms (4.4 lb).

The upper receiver is made from aluminium, and the lower receiver is made from carbon fiber. The upper receiver has a full-length Picatinny rail, and there are M-LOK slots on the left and right side of the weapon. 3D printing was utilised to make parts of the gun.

Typical for a submachine gun, its main application is for close-quarters combat, where it can be used by heavy weapon detachments, tank and aircraft crews, drivers, and radio or radar operators as a personal defence weapon.

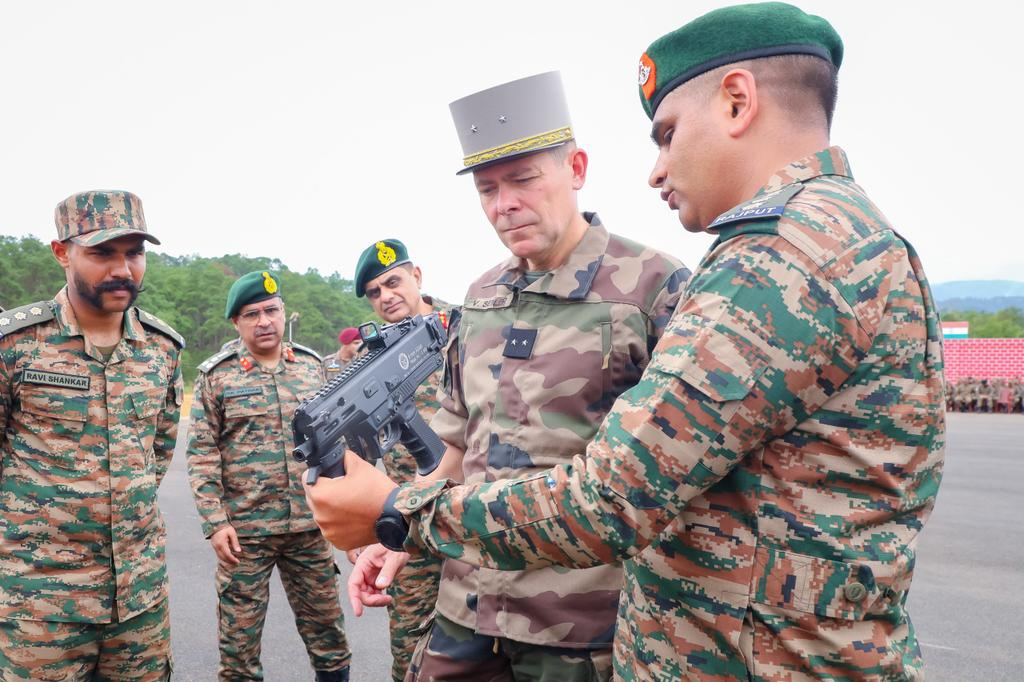
Indian Army showcasing ASMI to French soldier during Exercise Shakti

== Operators ==
- India
  - Indian Army
    - 550 delivered to Para (Special Forces) in Northern Command.
      - Delivered by 1 October 2024.
      - Inducted on 5 November 2024.
  - Assam Rifles
    - 10 delivered for trials. Further contract placed for 1,013 carbines in .
  - Border Security Force
    - 4 on order for trials.
  - National Security Guard
    - 10 delivered for trials.

== See also ==
- Joint Venture Protective Carbine
