= Shubham Gupta =

Indian Army officer(1995–2023)

Captain Shubham Gupta SM
- Born: 7 October 1995; Agra, Uttar Pradesh
- Died: 22 November 2023 (aged 28); Jammu and Kashmir, India
- Education: Indian Military Academy
- Military career
- Allegiance: India
- Branch: Indian Army
- Service years: 2015-2023
- Rank: Captain
- Service number: (IC-84541K)
- Units: 9 Para (Special Forces)
- Conflicts: Counter-insurgency operations in Jammu and Kashmir
- Awards: Sena Medal (Posthumous)

Captain Shubham Gupta, SM (7 October 1995 – 22 November 2023) was an elite officer in the Indian Army 9 Para (SF) unit.

He was posthumously awarded the Sena Medal (Gallantry) for his exceptional bravery during a counter-insurgency operation in the Rajouri sector of Jammu and Kashmir in November 2023.

== Early life and education ==
Gupta was commissioned into the Corps of Signals in 2018 before volunteering for the Special Forces.
