= Special forces of India =

Special units or platoons of the Indian army performing special tasks

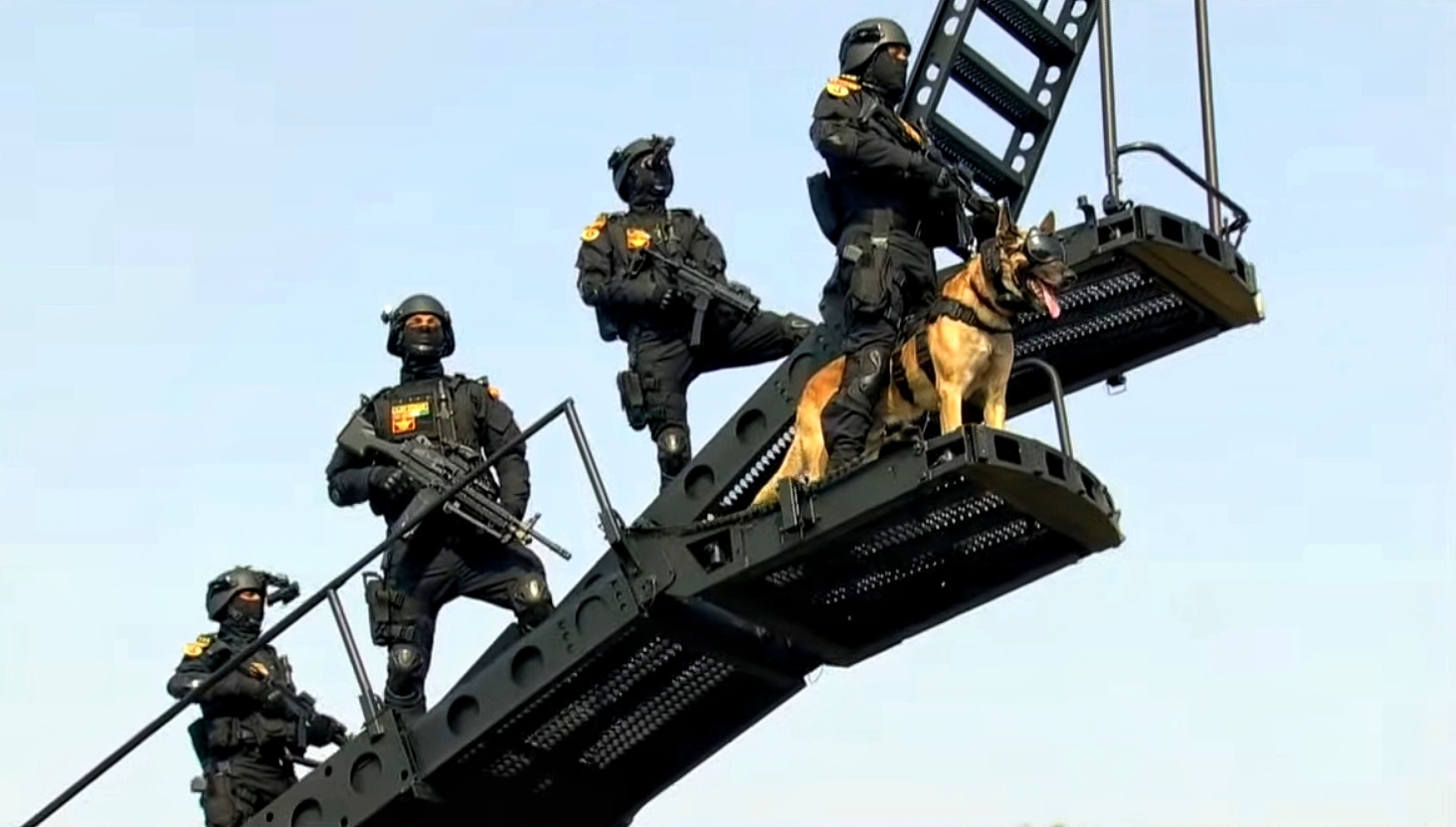
NSG commandos armed with SIG MPX, M249 SAWs and MP5s with their Belgian Malinois K-9 commando during the 2021 Indian Republic Day parade

India has several special forces (SF) units, with the various branches of the Indian Armed Forces having their own separate special forces units. The Para SF of the Indian Army, MARCOS of the Indian Navy and the Garud Commando Force of the Indian Air Force. There are other special forces which are not controlled by the military, but operate under civilian organisations, such as the National Security Guard under the Home Ministry, the Special Group and the Special Frontier Force under the Research & Analysis Wing (R&AW), the external intelligence agency of India. Small groups from the military SF units are deputed in the Armed Forces Special Operations Division, a unified command and control structure.

== Indian Army ==
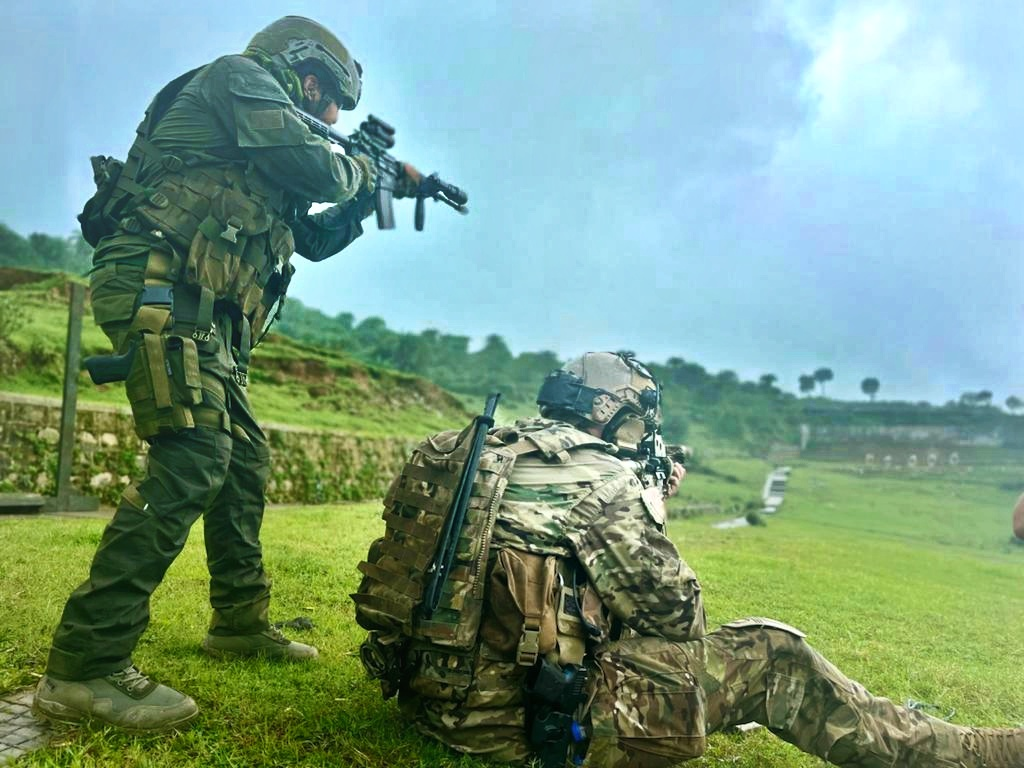
Indian Para SF (in Ranger Green uniform) and US Army Green Beret during exercise Vajra Prahar, 2022

=== Para (Special Forces) ===
The Para (Special Forces), or Para (SF), are the special forces of the Indian Army. This unit was created in June 1966 in the aftermath of the 1965 Indo-Pakistani war. An impromptu commando unit called Meghdoot Force, raised by Col Megh Singh VrC, which took part in the 1965 war, formed the first nucleus of the permanent Para commando battalion, which was to be raised under the Parachute Regiment. By 1969, the unit had grown into 2 battalions, viz. the 9 Para and the 1 Para. The unit's first combat missions were conducted during the 1971 Indo-Pakistani war in which they undertook raids against Pakistan's military.

Since the 1990s, the Para (Commando) have been deployed on counter-terrorism operations in the Kashmir region against insurgents. These operations include raids and ambushes. In 1999, Para (SF) undertook operations against Pakistan's military during the Kargil war, which included raids against Pakistani infantry and special forces. In 2002, the 2 Para (SF) participated in Operation Khukri in Sierra Leone to rescue 223 soldiers of the Indian Army's 5/8 Gorkha Rifles who were deployed as UN peacekeepers but were surrounded by militants from the Revolutionary United Front of Sierra Leone. Some of the later reported missions carried out by Para (SF) include the counter-insurgency operation purportedly undertaken inside Myanmar in 2015, and the 2016 Surgical Strikes.

In 1988, 6 Para spearheaded the only foreign intervention operation conducted by the Indian Armed Forces to restore democracy in Maldives by the order of Prime Minister Rajiv Gandhi. The operation was code-named Operation Cactus. Operation Cactus was launched to thwart a coup against the government of President Maumoon Abdul Gayoom. In the late 1980s, the Para (Commando) were deployed in Sri Lanka where they conducted helicopter-borne assaults and security operations. The unit 21 Para (SF) is reported to have killed many terrorists of Meitei and Kuki groups along the India-Myanmar boundary in 2022-23 while also avenging the killing of a Commanding Officer of 46 Assam Rifles and his family and eliminating the masterminds of the ambush on the Army column in 2015, earning many awards, accolades, and praise for the leadership. This has firmly established the unit as the best in the Indian Army.

The list of PARA (SF) Battalions is as follows:

- 1 PARA (SF) "Pratham"
- 2 PARA (SF) "Predators"
- 3 PARA (SF) "Russell's Vipers"
- 4 PARA (SF) "Daggers"
- 5 PARA (SF) "Batalik"
- 6 PARA (SF) "Sakht Para"
- 7 PARA (SF) "SE7EN"
- 9 PARA (SF) "Mountain Rats/Pirates"
- 10 PARA (SF) "Desert Scorpions"
- 11 PARA (SF) "Helleven"
- 12 PARA (SF) "Dirty Dozens"
- 13 PARA (SF) "Thunderbolts"
- 21 PARA (SF) "Waghnakhs"
- 23 PARA (SF) "Devil's Own"
- 29 PARA (SF) "Warriors N Monks"

== Indian Navy ==
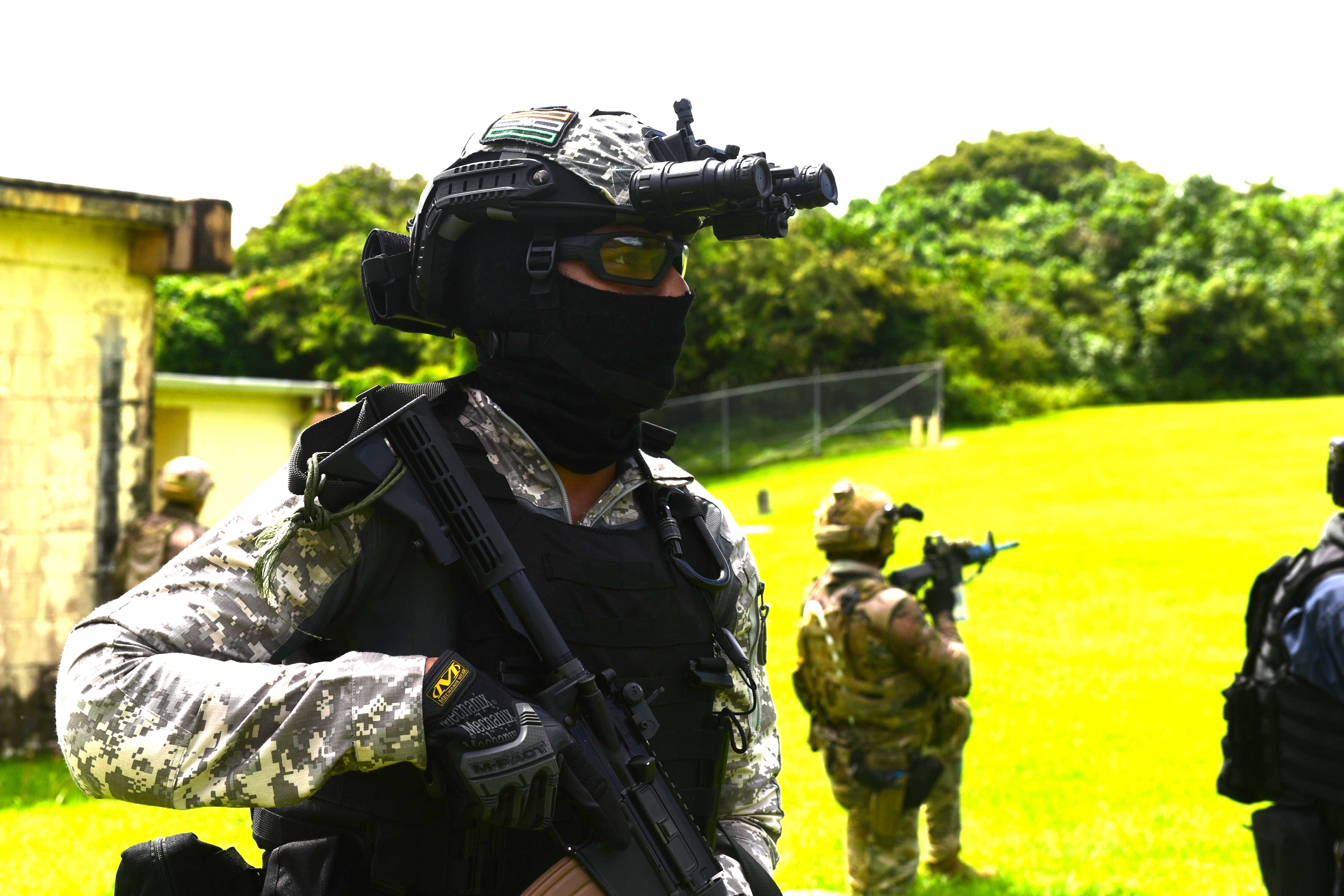
MARCOS and US Navy SEALs, Urban Combat Training, MALABAR 2021

=== MARCOS ===
First conceived in 1985, the Marine Commando Force, also called MARCOS, was raised in February 1987. It is the special forces unit of the Indian Navy. Initially, the U.S. Navy SEALs and British special forces trained a few officers of the Indian navy who formed the first core of MARCOS. Months after their creation, MARCOS were deployed in Sri Lanka against the Liberation Tigers of Tamil Eelam (LTTE) in July 1987. In the 1990s, MARCOS undertook numerous operations such as Operation Tasha (1991) against the LTTE, and Operation Zabardust (1992) against a ship that was smuggling arms, and in support of the United Nations in Somalia (1993). They also participated in the 1999 Kargil War. Since 1995, MARCOS have been permanently deployed for counter-terrorism operations in Jammu and Kashmir against militants. MARCOS had participated in efforts against the 2008 Mumbai attacks alongside the National Security Guards but their effectiveness was diluted due to bureaucratic indecision. MARCOS have also been deployed in anti-piracy operations.

After a 10-week-long basic training, MARCOS are sent to train alongside the Indian Army's Para (SF) for 3 weeks. Advanced training follows, during which MARCOS learn skills such as sky-diving, weapons training, counter-insurgency, languages, and warfare in different terrains, among other things. Each MARCOS squad, called Prahar, is composed of 8 soldiers. Some of the responsibilities of MARCOS are-

- Clandestine operations inside hostile territory, including diving operations and raids.
- Counter-terrorism operations.
- Providing support to Amphibious operations.
- Special surveillance and reconnaissance operations.

== Indian Air Force ==
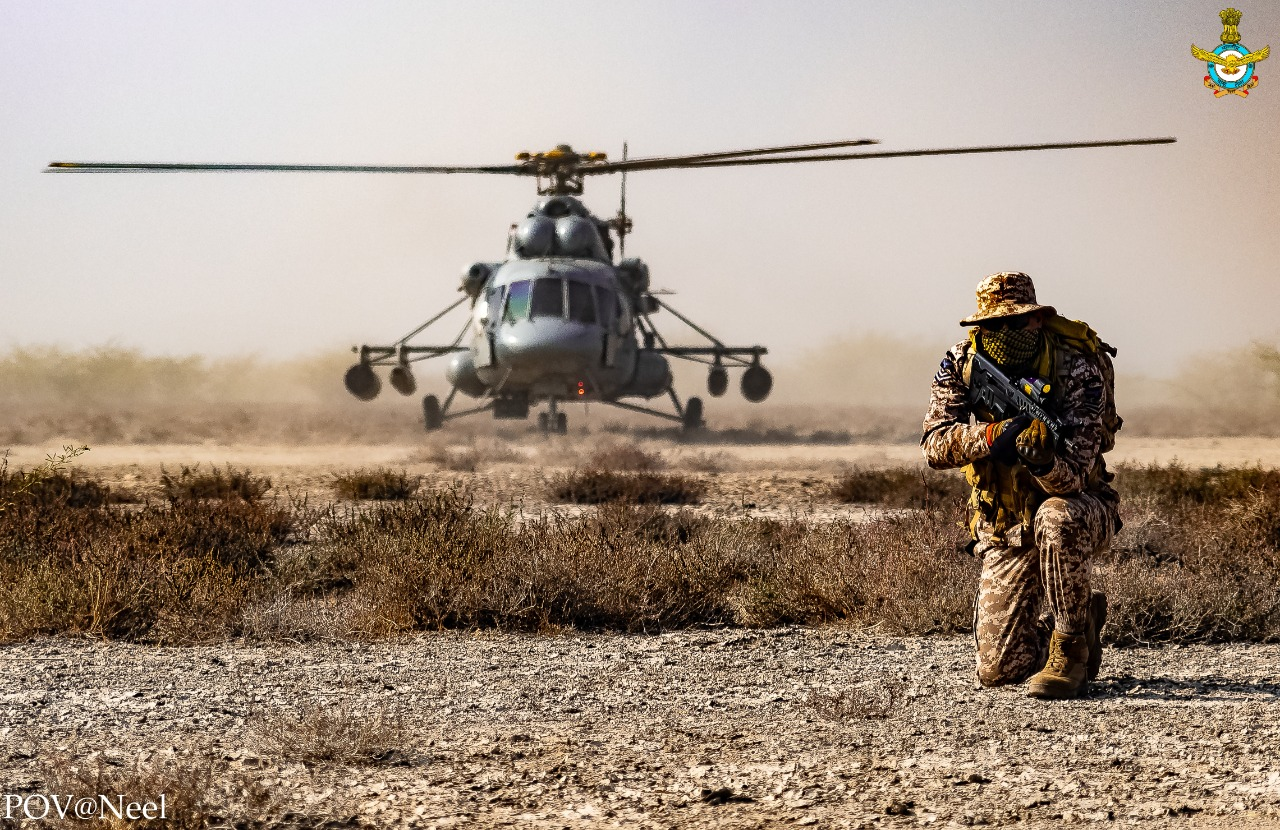
IAF Garud commando

=== Garud Commando Force ===
The Garud commandos are the special forces of the Indian Air Force (IAF). Their tasks include counter-terrorism, hostage rescue, providing security to IAF's assets, and various air force-specific special operations. First conceived in 2002, this unit was officially established on 6 February 2004.

All Garud cadets are volunteers who have received a 52-week basic training, which includes a three-month probation followed by basic airborne training, special operations training, other warfare methods, and survival skills. The last phase of basic training sees Garuds being deployed to get combat experience. Advanced training follows, which includes specialised weapons training.

The mandated tasks of the Garuds include direct action, special reconnaissance, rescuing downed pilots in hostile territory, establishing airbases in hostile territory, and providing air-traffic control to these airbases. The Garuds also undertake suppression of enemy air defences and the destruction of other enemy assets such as radars, evaluation of the outcomes of Indian airstrikes and use laser designators to guide Indian airstrikes. The security of IAF installations and assets is usually performed by the Air Force Police and the Defence Security Corps, even though some critical assets are protected by the Garuds.

== National Security Guard ==
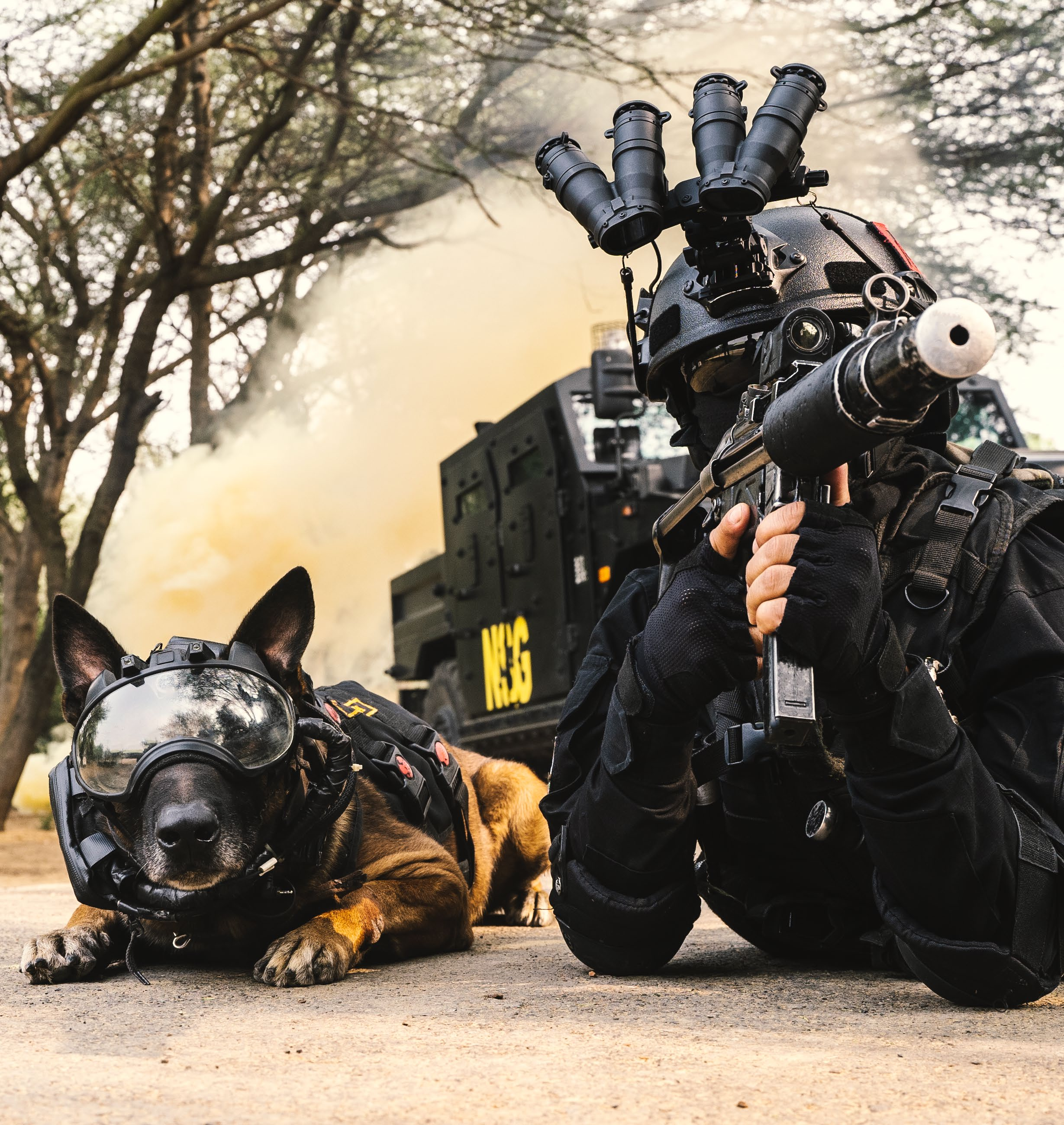
A NSG commando with his K-9 commando

The National Security Guard (NSG) is a specialized counter-terrorism federal contingency force. It was formally created in 1986. It is based on the British Army's Special Air Service and the German GSG 9. The NSG is popularly referred to as the 'Black Cats' due to its distinct black uniforms. It consists of the following two elements-

- SAG (Special Action Group), recruits personnel from the Indian Army.
- SRG (Special Rangers Group), recruits personnel from the state police, and Central Armed Police Forces.

The NSG consists entirely of volunteers on deputation from the Central Armed Police Forces, or the State Police departments and the Indian Army. NSG commandos are sent back to their parent department after serving with the force for a certain period. The Director General of the National Security Guard is an officer who is appointed from the Indian Police Service. Since 2012, women at the Central Armed Police Forces have been serving in the NSG.

== Research and Analysis Wing ==
=== Special Group ===
The Special Group is a clandestine special forces unit of the Research and Analysis Wing (R&AW). It was formed in 1981. The responsibilities of the Special Group include clandestine intelligence operations and covert and paramilitary operations and is known as 4 Vikas, 22 SF and 22 SG.The Special Group is different from the Vikas battalions of the Special Frontier Force; the name "4 Vikas" was given to it to create confusion. The designation of "22 SF" was given to the SG when it was deployed in Jammu and Kashmir (for counter-insurgency operations) to conceal the real name of the unit; obituaries for SG personnel who died carried this name. The number 22 in this designation is in succession with the number 21 in Indian Army‘s 21 Para (SF). Its responsibilities include conducting operations to thwart urban terrorism with which the Indian Armed Forces may not wish to be overtly associated.

=== Special Frontier Force ===
The Special Frontier Force (SFF) is a paramilitary Indian special forces unit composed primarily of Tibetan refugees and Gurkhas in India. It was established after the Sino-Indian War of 1962 to primarily conduct covert operations behind the Chinese lines in case of another war with China. Later it increased in size and scope of operations.

Based in Chakrata, Uttarakhand, the force was put under the direct supervision of the Intelligence Bureau (IB), and later the Research and Analysis Wing (R&AW), India's external intelligence agency, and is not part of the Indian Army but functions under their operational control with its own rank structure, charter and training infrastructure. It falls under the authority of the Directorate General on Security in the Cabinet Secretariat headed by an Inspector General (SFF) who is selected from the Major General rank of the Indian Army and who reports directly to the Prime Minister's Office.

The SFF has a total of six battalions called 1 Vikas, 2 Vikas, 3 Vikas, 5 Vikas, 6 Vikas, and 7 Vikas. Each battalion has around 800 troopers. The six battalions are commanded by Indian Army officers of colonel rank. At least five other Indian Army officers are in a battalion. At the helm of SFF is the Inspector General (SFF), an officer of Major General rank. The Special Group, or 4 Vikas, functions under a separate chain of command under the R&AW. Historically, by the late 1960s, the SFF was organised into six battalions for administrative purposes. In the past, each battalion, consisting of six companies, was commanded by a Tibetan who had a rank equivalent to a lieutenant colonel in the Indian Army. A Tibetan major or captain commanded each company, which was the primary unit used in operations. After the 1980s, the practice of giving Indian Army commissions to Tibetans was discontinued.

== In popular culture ==
- Uri: The Surgical Strike (2019) is an account of the tactical strikes conducted by Para (Special Forces) at the terrorist camps across the Line of Control in retaliation for the 2016 Uri attack.
- Maj Sandeep Unnikrishnan’s biopic Major was based on the attack of 26/11 Mumbai terror attack.
- State of Siege: 26/11 (2020), a TV show which shows how the NSG Commandos neutralized the terrorists from Pakistan in the 26/11 terror attack in Mumbai.
- State of Siege: Temple Attack (2021), is loosely based on the 2002 Akshardham Temple attack and the subsequent operation by the NSG to kill the terrorists.
- Jeet Ki Zid (2021) TV Show, is based on the life of a retired Indian Army special forces officer Major Deependra Singh Sengar.

== See also ==
- Armed Forces Special Operations Division (Indian tri-services command at operational level)
- Special Protection Group
