= 2016 Pampore stand-off =

Lashkar-e-Taiba attack in Kashmir, India

2016 Pampore standoff
- Part of the Insurgency in Jammu and Kashmir
Date	February 20 – 22, 2016
Location	Pampore, Jammu and Kasmir, India
Result	Standoff ends, militants killed

Belligerents
India: Indian Army; CRPF	Lashkar-e-Taiba

Units involved
Indian Army; Para (Special Forces); Central Reserve Police Force	

Strength
	4

Casualties and losses
3 Para SF personnel Killed; 2 CRPF personnel killed 4 CRPF personnel wounded.	4 killed
- 1 civilian killed

On 20 February 2016, four Lashkar-e-Taiba terrorists armed with AK-47 Assault rifles, UBGL, hand grenades, and explosives attacked a CRPF convoy on the main road linking Srinagar to Jammu, killing two CRPF personnel and a civilian. The militants then took refuge in the government-run multi-story building hosting "Entrepreneurship Development Institute" in Pampore. For Security forces, their main focus was to safely evacuate the civilians, stuck in the building. Units of the Indian Army and Central Reserve Police Force cordoned off the building and launched a joint operation, in they used armored vehicles to evacuate 120 civilians from the building. During the ongoing evacuation, the militants attacked with automatic gunfire and hand grenades. During the ensuing battle, three personnel from Indian Army lost their lives. The first army personnel was killed on the first day during the firefight, a terrorist was also killed in the firefight. After the firefight part of the EDI building caught on fire.

The next day, Special Forces personnel launched a final assault to flush out the militants held up in the building. Reconnaissance drones were used in preparation for the assault. The 48-hour stand-off ended with the deaths of all three of the remaining militants. Two personnel also lost their lives on that day.

Captain Pawan Kumar from 10 Para Special Forces, Captain Tushar Mahajan & Lance Naik Om Prakash from 9 Para Special Forces lost their life, in two long operations. With Captain Pawan Kumar losing his life on the first day and Captain Tushar Mahajan & Lance Naik Om Prakash losing their lives on the second.

== See also ==
- List of terrorist incidents, January–June 2016
