= Operation Khukri =

Part of the United Nations Mission in Sierra Leone

- Part of Sierra Leone Civil War
Date	13–16 July 2000
Location	Sierra Leone
Result	United Nations victory: Besieged Indian Forces extracted.; Freetown successfully defended against RUF attack.

Belligerents
(United Nations) UNAMSIL: India; United Kingdom; Ghana; Nigeria	Revolutionary United Front

Commanders and leaders
Maj. Gen. V.K. Jetley; Col. Randhir Kumar Mehta (Commander 5/8 Gurkha Rifles); Grp. Capt. Bijender Singh Siwach	Unknown

Strength
2,000: Ground & Airborne units; 223 troops (5/8th Gorkha Rifles, besieged at Kailahun); 6 riflemen companies (5/8th Gorkha Rifles & 14th Mechanised Infantry Battalion); 1 rapid reaction company (Mechanised infantry & Para SF); 18th Grenadiers; QRC of mechanised infantry; 1 company of engineers; 2 Para (SF); several mortars; 1 light gun; Aircraft; 3 Mil Mi-35s; 8 Mil Mi-8; 2 HAL Chetaks; 2 Chinooks; 1 C-130 Hercules; Reserves; 2 Ghanaian companies; 2 Nigerian companies	5,000 (5 battalions)

Casualties and losses
1 killed 7 wounded 1 vehicle destroyed	34 killed 150 injured

Operation Khukri was a multinational operation launched in the United Nations Mission in Sierra Leone (UNAMSIL), involving India, Ghana, Britain and Nigeria. The aim of the operation was to break the two-month-long siege laid by armed cadres of the Revolutionary United Front (RUF) around two companies of 5/8th Gorkha Rifles Infantry Battalion Group of the Indian Army at Kailahun by effecting a fighting breakout and redeploying them with the main battalion at Daru.

== Background ==
The Indian 5/8th Gorkha Rifles, 14th Mechanised Infantry and elements of the 23rd Mechanised Infantry, together designated as INDBATT-1, had been sent to Sierra Leone to aid the government in the disarmament of the RUF rebels. Two rifle companies had been kept as a quick reaction force. Elements of the 9th Para (SF), were also included.

By mid-April 2000, two of the companies of INDBATT-1 were deployed in Kailahun, while the rest were deployed in Daru. On May 1, elements of the RUF attacked and overran the KENBATT forces at Makeni. Due to a communication gap, the INDBATT-1 were not informed, and some of their commanders at Kailahun were captured the next day at a meeting with the RUF. Within ten days of this, some of the hostages were released due to intense pressure by INDBATT-1 and civilians; however, some, including the 2IC who had gone to negotiate, remained in 'honourable custody', being allowed to return to the base every day.

The situation worsened when the RUF disarmed 500 Kenyan peacekeepers and began advancing towards Freetown. As panic broke out, British troops evacuated the civilian staff at Freetown. The INDBATT-1 QRF was launched to Magburaka, where more Kenyans had been besieged. They made a 180-kilometer advance, pushing back several ambushes, and rescued the Kenyans. However, the situation at Kailahun kept deteriorating, and the two companies of 5/8th Gorkha Rifles remained in their base surrounded by hundreds of RUF rebels of the 1st Brigade.

Negotiations with the RUF rebels to release the 2IC and his party lasted seventy-five days, but were ultimately successful due to the involvement of Charles Taylor and Liberia. Meanwhile additional forces ex India were built up to launch operations to seize control over nearly 100 km of jungle track to break the siege at Kailahun.

== Order of battle ==
=== RUF Forces ===
The RUF rebels had six brigades, one of which were deployed in the sector. This brigade consisted of four main battalions, and one Strike Battalion. They were armed with AK-47s, RPGs, APCs, and SAMs. Each battalion was deployed in a particular area:

- 1st Battalion – Mobai
- 2nd Battalion – Kuiva
- 3rd Battalion – Neama
- 4th Battalion – Koindu
- 5th Battalion – Segbwema

=== UNAMSIL Forces ===
Indian:

- INDBATT-1 – 5/8th Gorkha Rifles Battalion and elements of 14th Mechanised Infantry
- QRC – A quick reaction force formed by elements of INDBATT-1, alongside 23 Mechanised Infantry and 9 Para (SF)
- INDMECH QRC – A Mechanised Infantry QRF
- INDENG Coy-2 – A Company of 116 Engineer Regiment
- INDSF Coy – A Team of 2nd Para (SF)
- Indian Aviation Unit – 8 Mil Mi-8s, 3 Mil Mi-35s, 2 HAL Chetaks
- INDBATT-2 – 18th Grenadiers Battalion
- Independent Composite Battery – Mortars 120 mm from 301 Light Regiment, Light Field Gun (105 mm) from 255th Field Regiment

Alongside these the Indians had set up a Sector HQ, Surgical HQ, and a Forward Surgical Team.

Other:

- GHANBATT – 2 Infantry Companies of the Ghana Army
- NIBATT – 2 Companies of the Nigerian Army
- RAF Aviation Unit: 2 Chinook Helicopters, 1 C-130
- Elements of B Squadron of the British SAS; These units guided the Aviation units during their tasks

== Plan of Operations ==
The battle was planned to involve five phases:

- Phase I: Mobilisation of UNAMSIL forces.
- Phase II: Pre-emptive strikes by the helicopters, and breakout by the besieged forces at Kailahun. The UNAMSIL forces were to secure the area for a clear extraction.
- Phase III: Link up of the besieged Kailahun column and Special Forces units at Giehun. 5/8 Gorkha Rifles (Daru column) to secure Pendembu.
- Phase IV: Link up of Daru column and Kailahun column at Pendembu. Extraction to begin by air.
- Phase V: All forces to fall back to Daru.

== Battle ==
=== Buildup ===
Phase I of the operation was the buildup of forces. Between 13th and 15th, the UNAMSIL forces were assembled at Daru and Kenewa. The IAF and RAF Aviation units were critical in the buildup, especially at Daru, since the area was cut off from the rest of the UN-controlled areas. By midnight, 14 July, the buildup was complete.

=== The role of Indian and UK Forces ===
The mission was conducted in a classical VUCA environment, in the absence of geographical information, using tourist maps and borrowing equipment from friendly nations. B squadron (22 SAS) collected valuable intelligence by conducting reconnaissance and inserting personnel in the area. Prior to the launch of the operation areas were mapped and UKSF and Indian forces liaised collecting intelligence which enabled the planning and execution of what would become one of the most daring operations conducted by the Indian Army on foreign soil.

The units at Kailahun were informed of the plan, and constantly kept in touch with the HQ through satellite phones. The operational plans were conveyed in Malayalam to overcome RUF monitoring of communications. Since the operation required insertion by helicopters, the two companies at Kailahun were required to fall back 500 metres from the town itself, and secure two helicopter landing zones.

=== Rescue Phase 1 ===
On 15 Jul 06:00, before first light, 20 special forces personnel from B squadron (22 SAS) were inserted by two British Chinook helicopters. The air assault was carried out under adverse conditions, with heavy rain and poor visibility, attack helicopter support was provided via the only remaining serviceable Sierra Leone MI-24 HIND piloted by Neall Ellis. This was hastily fitted with improvised NATO communications equipment. The RAF chinooks briefly landed at the helipad within the company location and extricated all MILOBs including an "inconvenienced" British Major, attached to the UN mission, Andrew Harrison (2 PARA). The INBATT Kailahun column thereafter delivered a comprehensive fire assault using fire assault using RLs, MMGs and AGLs and linked up in with the remaining armoured elements.

=== Rescue Phase 2 ===
The weather cleared at 09:30, and the UN helicopters were now available for providing much-needed air support to the advancing column. The RUF Forces reorganised, taking advantage of dense jungle and knowledge of jungle tracks to constantly snipe at the rearguard, making the Indian advance difficult and slow. The Indian MI-35 attack helicopter on the scene provided fire support to the advancing columns, making their advance much swifter. At 09:45 hours, the attack helicopters were tasked to provide covering fire to the Mi-8 helicopters as one company of 18th Grenadiers, part the INDBATT-2, was airlifted and dropped off north-east of Giehun, where they awaited the arrival of the Kailahun column.

At approximately 10:20 the KAilahun column linked up with the 18th Grenadiers at Giehun (1807), which had landed there at around 10:00. The force commander landed at Geihun to congratulate all ranks.

After the airlift, the column reorganised and advanced towards Pendembu. They were faced with two major roadblocks along the road, the first was an 8-foot-deep ditch, and the second, a 4-foot-deep one, each covered by troops with small arms and RPGs. Continuous sniping and slushy roads hampered the progress, but the column secured the area, and using bridging stores carried in the column and dropped by the MI-8s, the units crossed the bridges, and continued on their way.

=== Daru Column ===
At 06:20, after the extraction of personnel at Kailahun, the INDBATT-2, INDMECH QRC (Mech-2 company), and the rest of the 5/8th Gorkha Rifles (Mot-2 company) at Daru, commenced their operations. The 18th Grenadiers, alongside Infantry Fighting Vehicles from the Mech-2, and aided by artillery bombardment, secured a firm base along the road.

Immediately after securing the base, the Daru Column advanced along the road, with Mech-2 company's IFVs leading the advance. At 08:30, the column came under heavy fire from the north of the road, 500 metres short of Tikono. The IFVs neutralised the enemy and continued. The unit faced heavy resistance at both Bewobu, and Kuiva, but broke through with ease. Though the plan originally called for a physical capture and search of Kuiva, the speed of the advance of the Kailahun column, indicated a possibility of a link-up and evacuation on the same day. So the Daru column continued to advance quickly to Pendembu. Though the rebels had dug in positions in the town, they fled in the face of small arms fire by the column, and supporting fire from nearby mortars.

The column continued to move towards Area 3 bridges, suppressing enemy fire with their IFVs, while 9th Para, part of the battalion's QRC, was airlifted from Daru in 3 Mi-8s, and secured the bridges in Area 3. Maintaining momentum, the column met up with the QRC forces near the bridges at 1230 hours, and continued onwards to Pendembu.

=== Securing Pendembu ===
The Daru column and the QRC reached Pendembu, and prepared to assault the town. It was the HQ of the RUF 1st Brigade, and heavily defended. At 13:00 hours, an attack helicopter made five passes over the town strafing the defenders, and performed pinpoint engaging of the defenders in their entrenched positions. Meanwhile, the mortars relocated to a location north of the Area 3 bridges. Mot-2 Company was to attack and secure the nearly 300 houses of the town, as well as an air head to the south-west. Mech-2 moved in from the north, and neutralised all the targets, and occupied the northern side of the town. Mot-2 moved up and silenced the enemy positions in the south-west corner, using the IFVs, and then cleared the houses systematically with its riflemen. 4th Platoon of Mot-2, killed several rebels in the south-west pocket, and several more were killed in the armoury, cleared by 6th Platoon. A suitable airhead was established along the Daru-Pendembu road. All units linked up in the south-west corner, and reorganised into defensive positions for the evening.

At about 16:30 hours, the Daru Column personally led by the Commanding Officer of 5/8 Gurkha Rifles advanced through the jungle to link up with Kailahun column. A link up was established at 17:30 hours, and the entire force was gathered back at Pendembu by 19:00 hours. The units took up defensive positions around and inside Pendembu. Any attempts by the RUF to counter-attack were thwarted with accurate fire from the troops. The routes used by the RUF for reinforcements were constantly kept under surveillance by the scout helicopter. On two occasions regrouping militia were observed approaching Pendembu by the scout helicopter which directed the Mi-35 to carry out dissuading attacks on them using rockets and guns. Approach paths to the town were shelled by mortars and a 105 mm Light Field Gun throughout the night.

=== Helilift operations ===
The next day, 16 July, at 07:00 hours, Mot-2 secured an airhead and also prepared a helipad as well as readjusted the defences to prepare for the forthcoming helilift extraction. At 08:15 hours, Mil Mi-8 helicopters began arriving to extract the units. In 12 sorties, Mech-1 Company, Mot-1 Company, SF Company, D Company of the 18th Grenadiers, and 2 Platoons of QRC Company were extracted. At 09:30 hours, 50–60 enemies were spotted to the north of the town and effectively neutralised by the attack helicopters directed by Adjutant-GLO of 5/8GR and MFC grouped with Mech 2 ICVs which also brought down heavy fire. The last Mi-8s took off at 10:30 hours. The Gurkha battalion pioneers demolished the selected RUF bunkers, and the RUF ammunition store.

=== Move to Daru ===
After the last helicopter took off the remaining troops, consisting of Daru Column of 5/8th Gorkha Rifles, D-Company of the 18th Grenadiers, remaining QRC Companies, and the vehicles of the Kailahun Companies, began to make their way back to Daru, with Mot-2 in the lead. Mech-2 was to hold on to the northern edge of town, and then bring up the rear of the column, after a tactical disengagement. The column was constantly supported by one Mi-35 helicopter at all times. After neutralising enemies at the bridges, the column reached Kuiva without incident. At Kuiva, the Mi-35 helicopter and the IFVs blind fired on any suspected enemy positions repeatedly to ensure the safety of the column.

Despite the firm base being secured by 18th Grenadiers, the columns were ambushed near Kuiva. At 14:00 hours, scout helicopters reported that the road between Kuiva and Bewabu had been dug up. The 18th Grenadiers secured the roadblock position, but the column had to be halted as they had stretched over too long a distance. At this time, one of the vehicles was attacked by an RPG. The Mi-35 operating overhead was immediately called upon to engage the ambushing militia. The riflemen and IFVs cleared any remainder ambushing forces. Under the cover of helicopters the column continued to advance towards Daru.

At 14:30 hours, near Bewabu, the leading IFVs came across a ditch, covered by heavy small arms fire from higher ground on both sides. The Commanding Officer realised that his troops were in the kill zone. He immediately sent 4 Rifle Platoon to engage the enemy targets. The firefight continued for fifteen minutes, and the Mi-35 strafed enemies on both sides of the road. 6 Platoon and INDENG units bridged the gap, and the column immediately set off.

While the 5/8th Gorkha Rifles engaged the enemy at Bewabu, the 18th Grenadiers about six kilometers behind, supported by 2 BMPs from Mech-2, and 2 BRDMs of Mech-1, were engaged by enemy units just short of Kuiva. The units fought the enemy for about ten minutes, and continued to advance. About 500 metres from here, a vehicle carrying ammunition was hit by an RPG. Once again the Mi-35 was called upon and it carried out a strafing run in the direction of attack. No further opposition was encountered after this. The casualty was evacuated by a Chetak.

The convoy continued the rest of the way uneventfully. By 17:30 hours, all the units had safely reached Daru.

== Aftermath ==
The Indian military operation within the framework of the United Nations Mission in Sierra Leone (UNAMSIL) successfully achieved its objectives, resulting in the evacuation of all besieged personnel with a single reported casualty. This rescue mission significantly elevated the morale of UNAMSIL forces. Upon their arrival in Daru, the Indian contingent received a favorable reception from the local populace. Strategically, the engagement marked a substantial setback for the Revolutionary United Front (RUF).

The people of Sierra Leone helped build the Khukri War Memorial on the bank of the River Moa. The memorial honors Havaldar Krishan Kumar, who died during the operation.

== Popular culture ==
Red Chillies Entertainment, Dharma Productions, Azure Entertainment, and Flying Unicorn Entertainment are making a film based on Operation Khukri. The film will have Randip Hooda, Ayushmann Khurrana, and Rajkummar Rao in lead roles.

== See also ==
- Operation Barras, similar operation to rescue British soldiers
