= Airborne forces =

Military units deployed via parachute

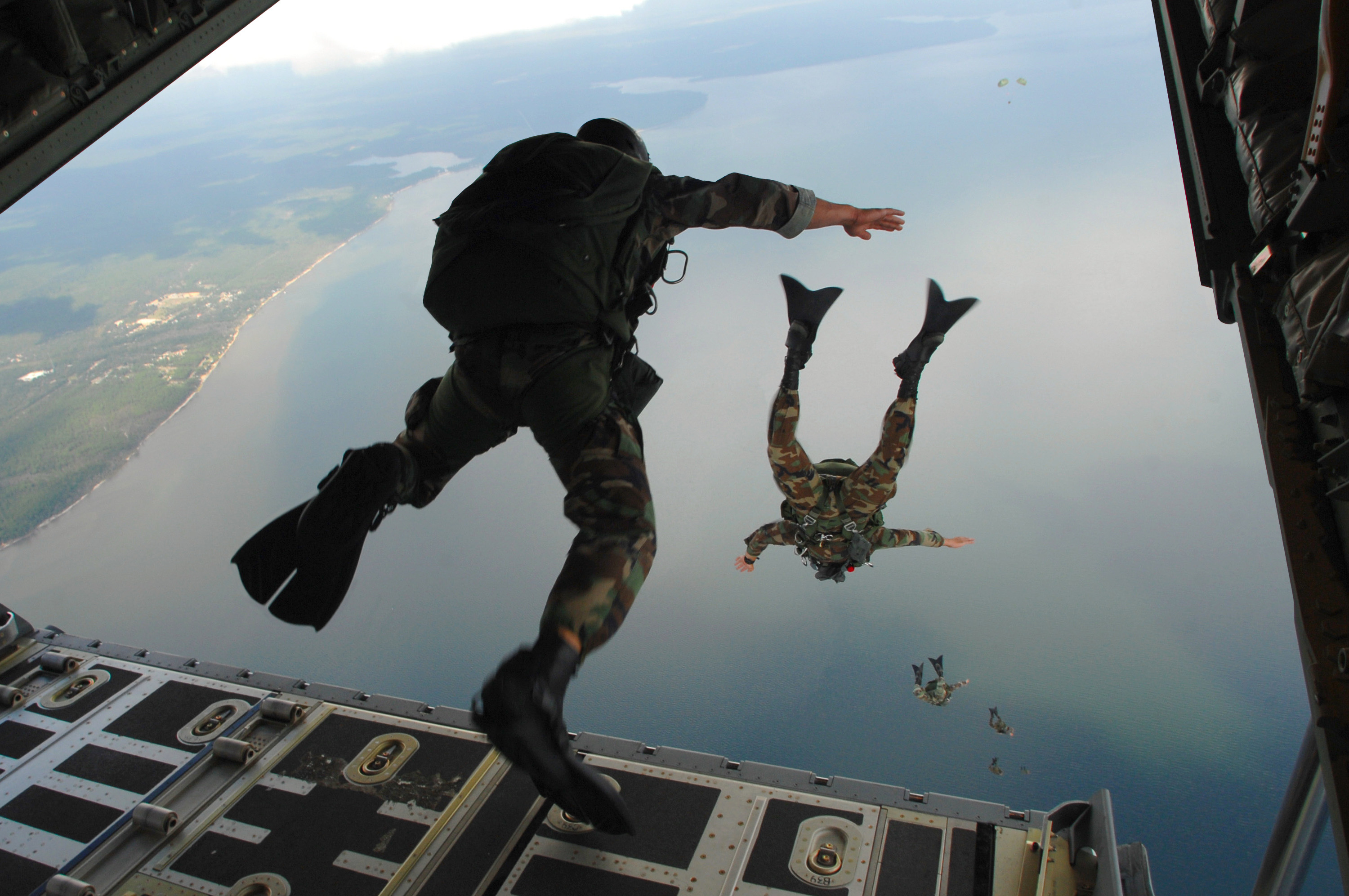
United States Air Force paratroopers from the 720th Special Tactics Group jumping from a C-130J Hercules aircraft during water rescue training off the Florida panhandle

Airborne forces are ground combat units carried by aircraft and airdropped into battle zones, typically by parachute drop. Parachute-qualified infantry and support personnel serving in airborne units are also known as paratroopers.

The main advantage of airborne forces is their ability to be deployed into combat zones without a land passage, as long as the airspace is accessible. Formations of airborne forces are limited only by the number and size of their transport aircraft; a sizeable force can appear "out of the sky" behind enemy lines in merely hours if not minutes, an action known as vertical envelopment.

Airborne forces typically lack enough supplies for prolonged combat and so they are used for establishing an airhead to bring in larger forces before carrying out other combat objectives. Some infantry fighting vehicles have also been modified for paradropping with infantry to provide heavier firepower.

Protocol I of the Geneva Conventions protects parachutists in distress, but not airborne troops. Their necessarily-slow descent causes paratroopers to be vulnerable to anti-air fire from ground defenders, but combat jumps are at low altitude (400–500 ft) and normally carried out a short distance away (or directly on if lightly defended) from the target area at night. Airborne operations are also particularly sensitive to weather conditions, which can be dangerous to both the paratroopers and airlifters, and so extensive planning is critical to the success of an airborne operation.

Advances in VTOL technologies (helicopter and tiltrotor) since World War II have brought increased flexibility, and air assaults have largely been the preferred method of insertion for recent conflicts, but airborne insertion is still maintained as a rapid response capability to get troops on the ground anywhere in the world within hours for a variety of missions.

== Early history ==
Benjamin Franklin envisioned the danger of airborne attack in 1784, only a few months after the first manned flight in a hot air balloon:

Five Thousand Balloons capable of raising two Men each, would not cost more than Five Ships of the Line: And where is the Prince who can afford so to cover his Country with Troops for its Defense, as that Ten Thousand Men descending from the Clouds, might not in many Places do an infinite deal of Mischief, before a Force could be brought together to repel them?

An early modern operation was first envisioned by Winston Churchill who proposed the creation of an airborne force to assault behind the German lines in 1917 during the First World War. Later in late 1918. Major Lewis H. Brereton and his superior Brigadier General Billy Mitchell suggested dropping elements of the U.S. 1st Division behind German lines near Metz. The operation was planned for February 1919 but the war ended before the attack could be seriously planned. Mitchell conceived that US troops could be rapidly trained to utilize parachutes and drop from converted bombers to land behind Metz in synchronisation with a planned infantry offensive.

Following the war, the United States Army Air Service experimented with the concept of carrying troops on the wings of aircraft, with them pulled off by the opening of their parachutes. The first true paratroop drop was by Italy in November 1927. Within a few years, several battalions were raised and eventually formed into two 185th Infantry Division "Folgore" and 184th Infantry Division "Nembo" divisions. Although they later fought with distinction in World War II, they were never used in a parachute drop. Men drawn from the Italian parachute forces were dropped in a special-forces operation in North Africa in 1943 in an attempt to destroy parked aircraft of the United States Army Air Forces.

At about the same time, the Soviet Union was also experimenting with the idea, planning to drop entire units complete with vehicles and light tanks. To help train enough experienced jumpers, parachute clubs were organized with the aim of transferring into the armed forces if needed. Planning progressed to the point that Corps-size drops were demonstrated to foreign observers, including the British Military Attaché Archibald Wavell, in the Kiev military district maneuvers of 1935.

One of the observing parties, Nazi Germany, was particularly interested. In 1936, Major F. W. Immans was ordered to set up a parachute school at Stendal (Borstel), and was allocated a number of Junkers Ju 52 aircraft to train on. The military had already purchased large numbers of Junkers Ju 52s which were slightly modified for use as paratroop transports in addition to their other duties. The first training class was known as Ausbildungskommando Immans. They commenced the first course on 3 May 1936.

Other nations, including Argentina, Peru, Japan, France and Poland also organized airborne units around this time. France became the first nation to organize women in an airborne unit, recruiting 200 nurses who during peacetime would parachute into natural disaster zones but also as reservists who would be a uniformed medical unit during wartime.

== World War II ==
=== Axis operations ===
Several groups within the German armed forces attempted to raise their own paratroop formations, resulting in confusion. As a result, Luftwaffe General Kurt Student was put in overall command of developing a paratrooper force to be known as the Fallschirmjäger.

During the invasions of Norway and Denmark in Operation Weserübung, the Luftwaffe dropped paratroopers on several locations. In Denmark, a small unit dropped on the Masnedøfort on the small island of Masnedø to seize the Storstrøm Bridge linking the islands of Falster and Zealand. A paratroop detachment also dropped at the airfield of Aalborg which was crucial for the Luftwaffe for operations over Norway. In Norway, a company of paratroopers dropped at Oslo's undefended airstrip. Over the course of the morning and early afternoon of 9 April 1940, the Germans flew in sufficient reinforcements to move into the capital in the afternoon, but by that time the Norwegian government had fled.

In the Battle of France, members of the Brandenburg Regiment landed by Fieseler Fi 156 Storch light reconnaissance planes on the bridges immediately to the south of the 10th Panzer Division's route of march through the southern Ardennes. In Belgium, a small group of German glider-borne troops landed on top of the Belgian fortress of Eben Emael on the morning of 10 May 1940, and disabled the majority of its artillery. The fort held on for another day before surrendering. This opened up Belgium to attack by German Army Group B.

The Dutch were exposed to the first large scale airborne attack in history. During the invasion of the Netherlands, the Germans threw into battle almost their entire Luftlandekorps, an airborne assault army corps that consisted of one parachute division and one division of airlanding troops plus the necessary transport capacity. The existence of this formation had been carefully kept secret until then. Two simultaneous airborne operations were launched. German paratroopers landed at three airfields near The Hague, hoping to seize the Dutch government. From one of these airfields, they were driven out after the first wave of reinforcements, brought in by Ju 52s, was annihilated by anti-aircraft fire and fierce resistance by some remaining Dutch defenders. As a result, numerous crashed and burning aircraft blocked the runway, preventing further reinforcements from landing. This was one of the few occasions where an airfield captured by paratroops has been recaptured. The other two airfields were recaptured as well. Simultaneously, the Germans dropped small packets of paratroopers to seize the crucial bridges that led directly across the Netherlands and into the heart of the country. They opened the way for the 9th Panzer Division. Within a day, the Dutch position became hopeless. Nevertheless, Dutch forces inflicted high losses on German transportation aircraft. Moreover, 1200 German elite troops from the Luftlandekorps taken prisoner around The Hague, were shipped to England just before the capitulation of the Dutch armed forces.

The Fallschirmjägers' greatest victory and greatest losses occurred during the Battle of Crete. Signals intelligence, in the form of Ultra, enabled the British to wait on each German drop zone, yet despite compromised secrecy, surviving German paratroops and airlanded mountain troops pushed the Commonwealth forces off the island in part by unexpected fire support from their light 75 mm guns, though seaborne reinforcements were destroyed by the Royal Navy. However, the losses were so great that Adolf Hitler forbade their use in such operations in the future. He felt that the main strength of the paratroopers was novelty, and now that the British had clearly figured out how to defend against them, there was no real point to using them any more.

One notable exception was the use of airborne forces in special operations. On 12 September 1943, Otto Skorzeny led a daring glider-based assault on the Gran Sasso Hotel, high in the Apennines mountains, and rescued Benito Mussolini from house arrest with very few shots being fired. On 25 May 1944, paratroopers were dropped as part of a failed attempt to capture Josip Broz Tito, the head of the Yugoslav Partisans and later postwar leader of Yugoslavia.

Before the Pacific War began, the Imperial Japanese Army formed Teishin Dan ("Raiding Brigades") and the Imperial Japanese Navy trained marine (Rikusentai) paratroopers. They used paratroops in several battles in the Dutch East Indies campaign of 1941–1942.

Rikusentai airborne troops were first dropped at the Battle of Manado, Celebes in January 1942, and then near Usua, during the Timor campaign, in February 1942. Teishin made a jump at the Battle of Palembang, on Sumatra in February 1942. Japanese airborne units suffered heavy casualties during the Dutch East Indies campaign, and were rarely used as parachute troops afterward.

On 6 December 1944, a 750-strong detachment from Teishin Shudan ("Raiding Division") and the Takachiho special forces unit, attacked U.S. airbases in the Burauen area on Leyte, in the Philippines. The force destroyed some planes and inflicted casualties, but was eventually wiped out.

Japan built a combat strike force of 825 gliders but never committed it to battle.

=== Allied operations ===
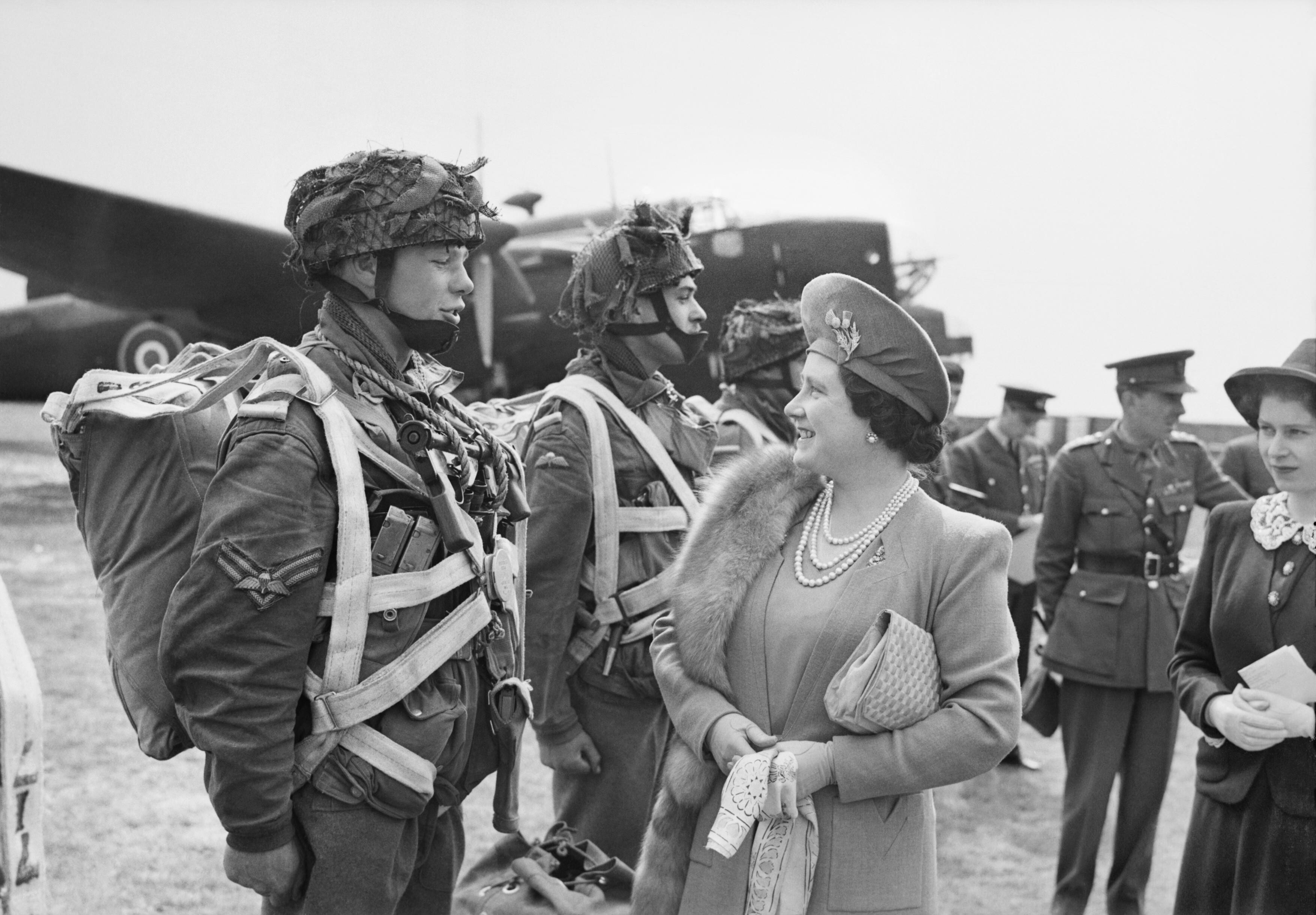
Queen Elizabeth and Princess Elizabeth talking to paratroopers in preparation of D-Day, 19 May 1944

Ironically, the battle that ended Germany's paratrooper operations had the opposite effect on the Allies. Convinced of the effectiveness of airborne assaults after Crete, the Allies hurried to train and organize their own airborne units. The British established No.1 Parachute Training School at RAF Ringway near Manchester, which trained all 60,000 European paratroopers recruited by the Allies during World War II.

An Airlanding School was also set up in New Delhi, India, in October/November 1941, at the then-Welllingdon Airport (now the defunct Safdarjang Airport) to train paratroopers for the British Indian Army which had been authorised to raise an airborne-capable formation earlier, resulting in the formation of the 50th Indian Parachute Brigade. The Indian airborne forces expanded during the war to the point that an airborne corps was planned bringing together the 2nd Indian Airborne Division and the British 6th Airborne Division, but the war ended before it could materialize.

A fundamental decision was whether to create small airborne units to be used in specific coup-de-main type operations, or to organize entire airborne divisions for larger operations. Many of the early successful airborne operations were small, carried out by a few units, such as seizing a bridge. After seeing success of other units and observing smokejumper training methods on how training can be done in June 1940, General William C. Lee of the U.S. Army established the Army's first airborne division. The 101st would be reorganized into the 101st Airborne Division.

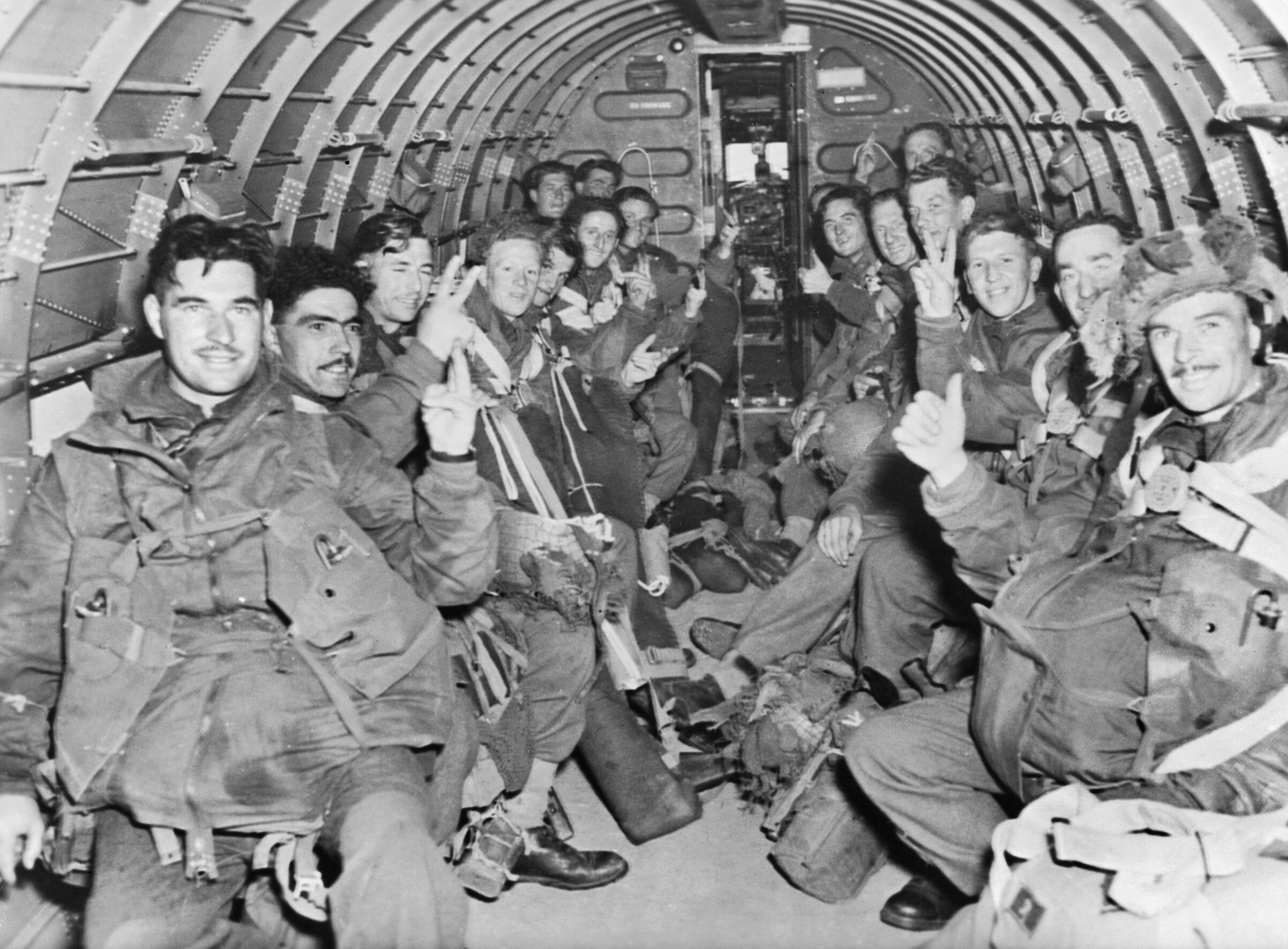
Paratroopers of the 3rd Parachute Battalion, 1st Airborne Division, inside an RAF Dakota (C-47) during the flight to Arnhem, 17 September 1944

The Allies eventually formed two British and five American divisions: the British 1st and 6th Airborne Divisions, and the U.S. 11th, 13th, 17th, 82nd, and 101st Airborne Divisions. By 1944, the British divisions were grouped into the 1st Airborne Corps under Lieutenant-General Sir Frederick Browning, while the American divisions in the European Theatre (the 17th, 82nd, and 101st) were organized into the XVIII Airborne Corps under Major General Matthew Ridgway. Both corps fell under the First Allied Airborne Army under U.S. Lieutenant General Lewis H. Brereton.

The first U.S. airborne operation was by the 509th Parachute Infantry Battalion in November 1942, as part of Operation Torch in North Africa. The U.S. 82nd and 101st Airborne Divisions saw the most action in the European Theater, with the former in Sicily and Italy in 1943, and both in Normandy and the Netherlands in 1944. The 517th Parachute Regimental Combat Team was the principal force in Operation Dragoon in Southern France. The 17th Airborne Division deployed to England in 1944 but did not see combat until the Battle of the Bulge in January 1945 where they, along with the 82nd and 101st Airborne Divisions were deployed as ground troops.

The U.S. 11th and 13th Airborne Divisions were held in reserve in the United States until 1944 when the 11th Airborne Division was deployed to the Pacific, but mostly used as ground troops or for smaller airborne operations. The 13th Airborne Division was deployed to France in January 1945 but never saw combat as a unit.

==== Soviet operations ====
The Soviets mounted only one large-scale airborne operation in World War II, despite their early leadership in the field in the 1930s. Russia also pioneered the development of combat gliders, but used them only for cargo during the war.

Axis air superiority early in the conflict limited the ability of the Soviets to mount such operations, whilst later in the conflict ongoing shortages of materiel, including silk for parachutes, was also a problem. Nonetheless, the Soviets maintained their doctrinal belief in the effectiveness of airborne forces, as part of their concept of "deep battle", throughout the war. The largest drop during the war was corps-sized (the Vyazma airborne Operation, the 4th Airborne Corps). It was unsuccessful. Airborne formations were used as elite infantry units however, and played a critical role in several battles. For example, at the Battle of Kursk, the Guards Airborne defended the eastern shoulder of the southern penetration and was critical to holding back the German penetration.

The Soviets sent at least one team of observers to the British and American airborne planning for D-Day, but did not reciprocate the liaison.

==== Early commando raids ====
===== Operation Colossus: Raid on the Tragino Aqueduct =====
Britain's first airborne assault took place on 10 February 1941, when 'X' Troop, No 11 Special Air Service Battalion (which was formed from No 2 Commando and subsequently became 1st Battalion, The Parachute Regiment) dropped into southern Italy from converted Whitley bombers flying from Malta and demolished a span of the aqueduct near Tragino in a daring night raid named Operation Colossus.

===== Operation Squatter: Raid on Axis airfields in Libya =====
54 effectives of 'L' Detachment, Special Air Service Brigade (largely drawn from the disbanded Layforce) mounted a night parachute insertion onto two drop zones in Bir Temrad, North Africa on the night of 16/17 November 1941 in preparation for a stealthy attack on the forward airfields of Gambut and Tmimi in order to destroy the Axis fighter force on the ground before the start of Operation Crusader, a major offensive by the British Eighth Army.

===== Operation Biting: The Bruneval raid =====
A Würzburg radar site on the coast of France was attacked by a company of 120 British paratroopers from 2 Battalion, Parachute Regiment, commanded by Major John Frost, in Operation Biting on 27 February 1942. The key electronic components of the system were dismantled by an English radar mechanic and brought back to Britain for examination so that countermeasures could be devised. The result was a British victory. Of the 120 paratroopers who dropped in the dead of night, there were two killed, six wounded, and six captured.

==== Mediterranean ====
===== Operation Mercury: Crete =====
This was the last large-scale airborne assault by Hitler and the Germans. The German paratroopers had such a high casualty rate that Hitler forbade any further large-scale airborne attacks. The Allies, on the other hand, were very impressed by the potential of paratroopers, and started to build their own airborne divisions.

===== Operation Torch: North Africa =====
The first United States airborne combat mission occurred during Operation Torch in North Africa on 8 November 1942. 531 men of the 2nd Battalion, 509th Parachute Infantry Regiment flew over 1,600 miles (2,600 km) at night from Britain, over Spain, intending to drop near Oran and capture two airfields. Navigation errors, communications problems, and bad weather scattered the forces. Seven of the 39 C-47s landed far from Oran from Gibraltar to Tunisia, and only ten actually delivered their troops by parachute drop. The remainder off-loaded after 28 C-47 troop carriers, short on fuel, landed on the Sebkra d'Oran dry lake, and marched overland to their objectives.

One week later, after repacking their own chutes, 304 men of the battalion conducted a second combat jump on 15 November 1942 to secure the airfield at Youk-les-Bains near the Tunisian border. From this base, the battalion conducted combined operations with various French forces against the German Afrika Korps in Tunisia. A unit of French Algerian infantry, the 3rd Regiment of Zouaves, was present at Youk-les-Bains and awarded the American paratroopers their own regimental crest as a gesture of respect. This badge was awarded to the battalion commander on 15 November 1942 by the 3rd Zouaves' regimental commander, and is worn today by all members of the 509th Infantry.

===== Operation Husky: Sicily =====
As part of Operation Husky, the Allied invasion of the island of Sicily, four airborne operations (two British and two American) were carried out, landing during the nights of 9 and 10 July 1943. The American paratroopers were from the 82nd Airborne Division, mainly Colonel James Gavin's 505th Parachute Regimental Combat Team (consisting of the 3rd Battalion of the 504th PIR, Company 'B' of the 307th Airborne Engineer Battalion and the 456th Parachute Field Artillery Battalion, with other supporting units), making their first combat jump. Strong winds encountered en route blew the dropping aircraft off course and scattered them widely. The result was that around half the paratroopers failed to make it to their rallying points. The British airborne troops from the 1st Airborne Division were glider infantry of the 1st Airlanding Brigade, commanded by Brigadier Philip Hicks, and they fared little better. Only 12 out of 137 gliders in Operation Ladbroke landed on target, with more than half landing in the sea. Nevertheless, the scattered airborne troops maximised their opportunities, attacking patrols and creating confusion wherever possible. On the night of 11 July, a reinforcement drop of the 82nd, consisting of the 504th Parachute Regimental Combat Team (composed of the 1st and 2nd Battalions, the 376th Parachute Field Artillery and Company 'A' of the 307th Airborne Engineer Battalion), under Colonel Reuben Tucker, behind American lines at Farello airfield resulted in heavy friendly fire casualties when, despite forewarnings, Allied anti-aircraft fire both ashore and aboard U.S Navy ships shot down 23 of the transports as they flew over the beachhead.

Despite a catastrophic loss of gliders and troops loads at sea, the British 1st Airlanding Brigade captured the Ponte Grande bridge south of Syracuse. Before the German counterattack, the beach landings took place unopposed and the 1st Airlanding Brigade was relieved by the British 5th Infantry Division as it swept inland towards Catania and Messina.

On the evening of 13 July 1943, more than 112 aircraft carrying 1,856 men and 16 gliders with 77 artillerymen and ten 6 pounder guns, took off from North Africa in Operation Fustian. The initial target of the British 1st Parachute Brigade, under Brigadier Gerald Lathbury, was to capture the Primosole bridge and the high ground around it, providing a pathway for the Eighth Army, but heavy anti-aircraft fire shot down many of the Dakotas before they reached their target. Only 295 officers and men were dropped close enough to carry out the assault. They captured the bridge, but the German 4th Parachute Regiment recaptured it. They held the high ground until relieved by the 50th (Northumbrian) Infantry Division of the Eighth Army, which re-took the bridge at dawn on 16 July.

The Allied commanders were forced to reassess the use of airborne forces after the many misdrops and the deadly friendly fire incident.

===== Swing Board and the Knollwood Maneuver =====
General Dwight D. Eisenhower reviewed the airborne role in Operation Husky and concluded that large-scale formations were too difficult to control in combat to be practical. Lieutenant General Lesley J. McNair, the overall commander of Army Ground Forces, had similar misgivings: once an airborne supporter, he had been greatly disappointed by the performance of airborne units in North Africa and more recently Sicily. However, other high-ranking officers, including the Army Chief of Staff George Marshall, believed otherwise. Marshall persuaded Eisenhower to set up a review board and to withhold judgement until the outcome of a large-scale maneuver, planned for December 1943, could be assessed.

McNair ordered 11th Airborne Division commander Major general Joseph May Swing to form a committee—the Swing Board—composed of air force, parachute, glider infantry and artillery officers, whose arrangements for the maneuver would effectively decide the fate of divisional-sized airborne forces. As the 11th Airborne Division was in reserve in the United States and had not yet been earmarked for combat, the Swing Board selected it as the test formation. The maneuver would additionally provide the 11th Airborne and its individual units with further training, as had occurred several months previously in an earlier large-scale exercise conducted by the 82nd and 101st Airborne Divisions.

The 11th Airborne, as the attacking force, was assigned the objective of capturing Knollwood Army Auxiliary Airfield near Fort Bragg in North Carolina. The force defending the airfield and its environs was a combat team composed of elements of the 17th Airborne Division and a battalion from the 541st Parachute Infantry Regiment. The entire operation was observed by McNair, who would ultimately have a significant say in deciding the fate of the parachute infantry divisions.

The Knollwood Maneuver took place on the night of 7 December 1943, with the 11th Airborne Division being airlifted to thirteen separate objectives by 200 C-47 Skytrain transport aircraft and 234 Waco CG-4A gliders. The transport aircraft were divided into four groups, two of which carried paratroopers while the other two towed gliders. Each group took off from a different airfield in the Carolinas. The four groups deployed a total of 4,800 troops in the first wave. Eighty-five percent were delivered to their targets without navigational error, and the airborne troops seized the Knollwood Army Auxiliary Airfield and secured the landing area for the rest of the division before daylight. With its initial objectives taken, the 11th Airborne Division then launched a coordinated ground attack against a reinforced infantry regiment and conducted several aerial resupply and casualty evacuation missions in coordination with United States Army Air Forces transport aircraft. The exercise was judged by observers to be a great success. McNair, pleased by its results, attributed this success to the great improvements in airborne training that had been implemented in the months following Operation Husky. As a result of the Knollwood Maneuver, division-sized airborne forces were deemed to be feasible and Eisenhower permitted their retention.

===== Italy =====
Italy agreed to an armistice with the Allies on 3 September 1943, with the stipulation that the Allies would provide military support to Italy in defending Rome from German occupation. Operation Giant II was a planned drop of one regiment of the U.S. 82nd Airborne Division northwest of Rome, to assist four Italian divisions in seizing the Italian capital. An airborne assault plan to seize crossings of the Volturno river during the Allied invasion of Italy, called Operation Giant, was abandoned in favor of the Rome mission. However, doubts about the willingness and capability of Italian forces to cooperate, and the distance of the mission far beyond support by the Allied military, resulted in the 82nd Airborne artillery commander, Brigadier General Maxwell Taylor (future commander of the 101st Airborne Division), being sent on a personal reconnaissance mission to Rome to assess the prospects of success. His report via radio on 8 September caused the operation to be postponed (and canceled the next day) as troop carriers loaded with two battalions of the 504th PIR were warming up for takeoff.

With Giant II cancelled, Operation Giant I was reactivated to drop two battalions of the 504th PIR at Capua on 13 September. However, significant German counterattacks, beginning on 12 September, resulted in a shrinking of the American perimeter and threatened destruction of the Salerno beachhead. As a result, Giant I was cancelled and the 504th PIR instead dropped into the beachhead on the night of 13 September using transponding radar beacons as a guide. The next night the 505th PIR was also dropped into the beachhead as reinforcement. In all, 3,500 paratroopers made the most concentrated mass night drop in history, providing the model for the American airborne landings in Normandy in June 1944. An additional drop on the night of 14–15 September of the 509th PIB to destroy a key bridge at Avellino, to disrupt German motorized movements, was badly dispersed and failed to destroy the bridge before the Germans withdrew to the north.

In April 1945, Operation Herring, an Italian commando-style airborne drop aimed at disrupting German rear area communications and movement over key areas in Northern Italy, took place. However the Italian troops were not dropped as a unit, but as a series of small (8–10 man) groups. Another operation, Operation Potato, was mounted by men drawn from the Folgore and Nembo divisions, operating with British equipment and under British command as No. 1 Italian Special Air Service Regiment. The men dropped in small groups from American C-47s and carried out a successful railway sabotage operation in northern Italy.

==== Western Europe ====
The Allies had learned better tactics and logistics from their earlier airborne drops, and these lessons were applied for the assaults along the Western Front.

===== Operation Neptune =====
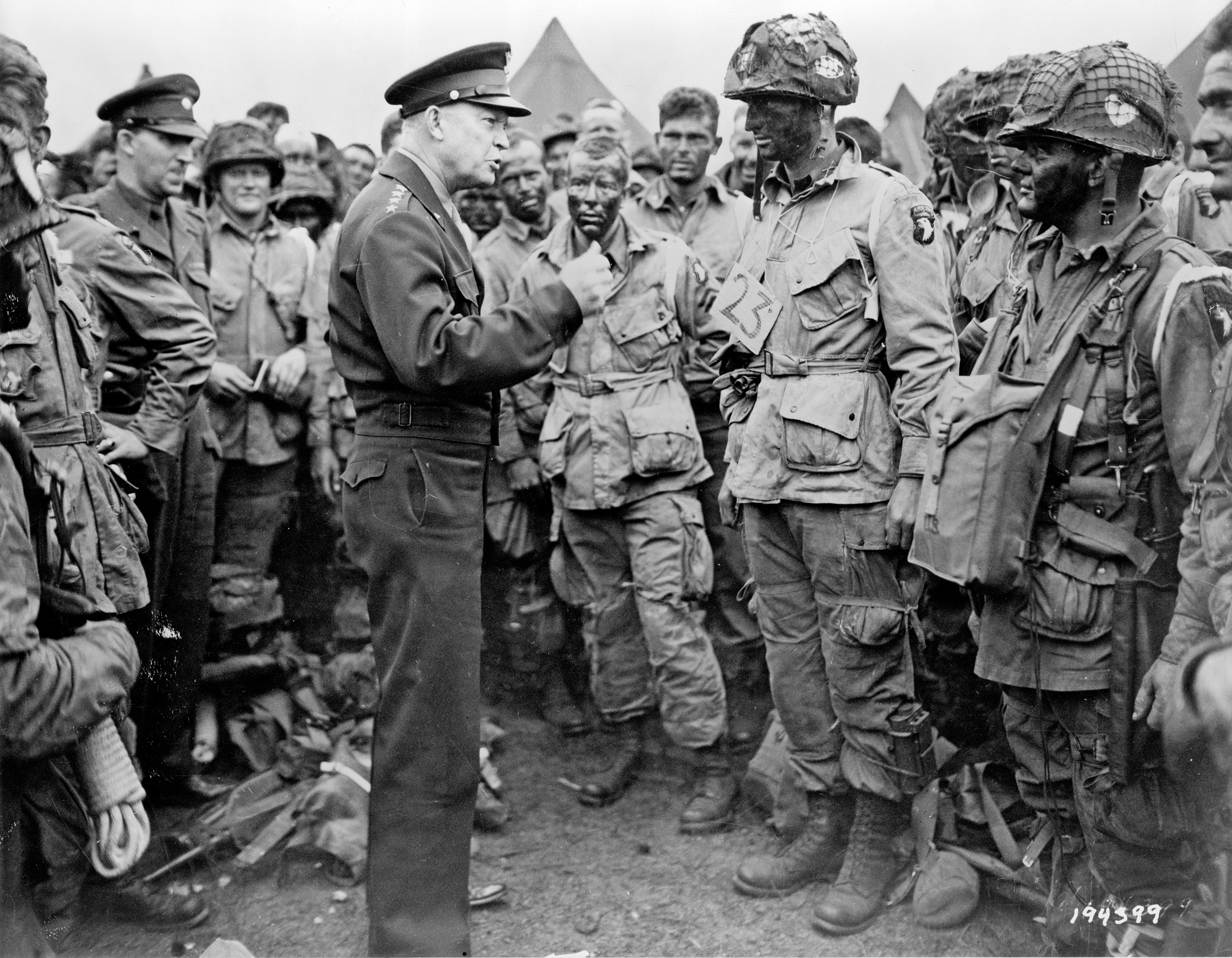
Dwight D. Eisenhower speaks with American paratroopers of the 502nd Parachute Infantry Regiment, 101st Airborne Division on the evening of 5 June 1944.

One of the most famous of airborne operations was Operation Neptune, the assault of Normandy, part of Operation Overlord of the Normandy landings on 6 June 1944. The task of the airborne forces was to secure the flanks and approaches of the landing beaches in Normandy. The British glider transported troops and paratroopers of the 6th Airborne Division, which secured the eastern flank during Operation Tonga. This operation included the capture of the Caen canal and Orne river bridges, and the attack on the Merville gun battery. The American glider and parachute infantry of the 82nd (Operation Detroit) and 101st Airborne Divisions (Operation Chicago), though widely scattered by poor weather and poorly marked landing zones in the American airborne landings in Normandy, secured the western flank of U.S. VII Corps with heavy casualties. All together, airborne casualties in Normandy on D-Day totaled around 2,300.

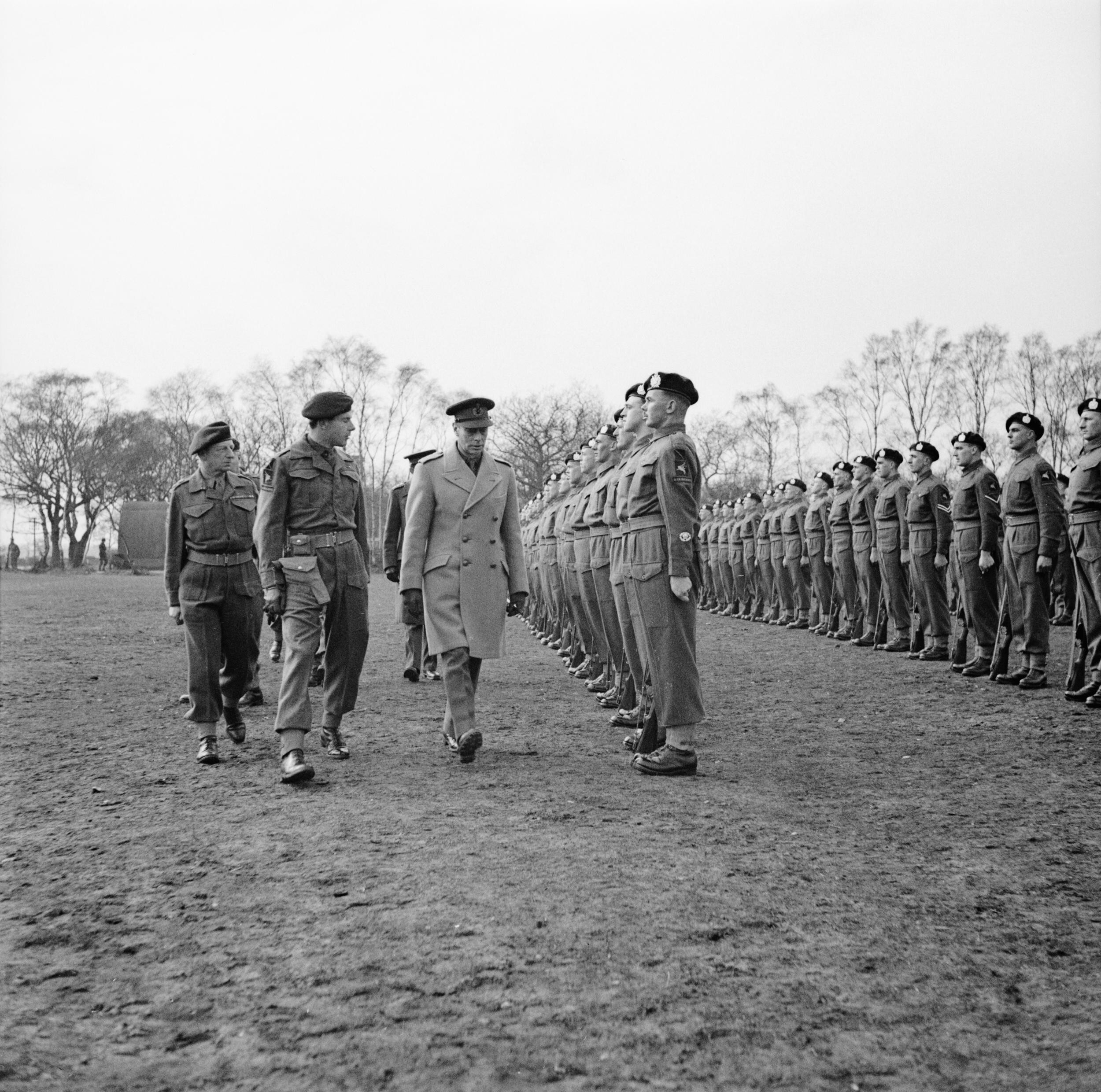
King George VI inspects men of the 7th Battalion, King's Own Scottish Borderers, 1st Airborne Division, in the North Midlands, 1944.

Operation Dingson (5–18 June 1944) was conducted by about 178 Free French paratroops of the 4th Special Air Service (SAS), commanded by Colonel Pierre-Louis Bourgoin, who jumped into German-occupied France near Vannes, Morbihan, southern Brittany, in Plumelec, at 1130 on the night of 5 June and Saint-Marcel (8–18 June). At this time, there was approximately 100,000 German troops and artillery preparing to move to the Normandy landing areas. Immediately upon landing, 18 Free French went into action near Plumelec against German troops (Vlassov's army). The Free French established a base at Saint-Marcel and began to arm and equip local resistance fighters, operating with up to 3,000 Maquis. However, their base was heavily attacked by a German paratroop division on 18 June, and the men were forced to disperse. Captain Pierre Marienne with 17 of his companions (six paratroopers, eight resistance fighters and three farmers) died a few weeks later in Kerihuel, Plumelec, at dawn of 12 July. The Dingson team was joined by the men who had just completed Operation Cooney. Dingson was conducted alongside Operation Samwest and Operation Lost as part of Overlord.

In Operation Dingson 35A, on 5 August 1944, 10 Waco CG-4A gliders towed by aircraft of 298 Squadron and 644 Squadron transported Free French SAS men and armed jeeps to Brittany near Vannes (Locoal-Mendon), each glider carrying three Free French troopers and a jeep. One glider was lost with the death of the British pilot. The SAS teams remained behind enemy lines until the Allies arrived.

===== Operation Dragoon: Southern France =====
On 15 August 1944, airborne units of the 6th Army Group provisional airborne division, commanded by U.S. Major General Robert T. Frederick, opened Operation Dragoon, the invasion of Southern France, with a dawn assault. Called the "1st Airborne Task Force", the force was composed of the 1st Special Services Forces, British 2nd Independent Parachute Brigade, the 517th Parachute Regimental Combat Team, the 509th and 551st Parachute Infantry Battalions, the glider-borne 550th Airborne Infantry Battalion, and supporting units. Nearly 400 aircraft delivered 5,600 paratroopers and 150 guns to three drops zones surrounding Le Muy, between Fréjus and Cannes, in phase 1, Operation Albatross. Once they had captured their initial targets, they were reinforced by 2,600 soldiers and critical equipment carried in 408 gliders daylight missions code-named Operation Bluebird, phase 2, simultaneous with the beach landings, and Operation Dove, phase 3. A second daylight parachute drop, Operation Canary, dropped 736 men of the 551st PIB with nearly 100% effectiveness late on the afternoon of 15 August. The airborne objective was to capture the area, destroy all enemy positions and hold the ground until the U.S. Seventh Army came ashore.

===== Operation Market Garden: "A Bridge Too Far" =====
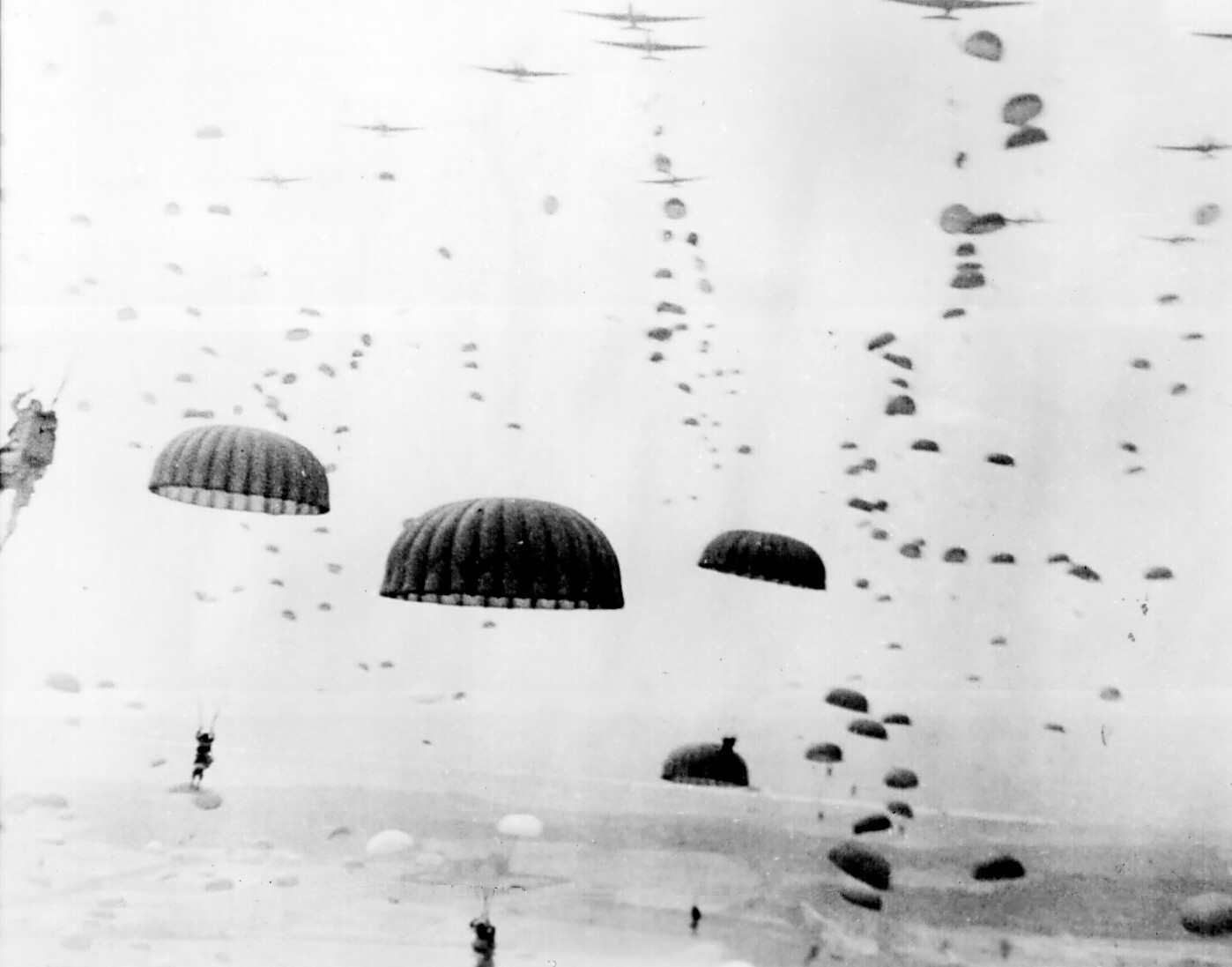
Waves of paratroops land in the Netherlands during Operation Market Garden in September 1944.

Operation Market Garden of September 1944, involved 35,000 airborne troops dropped up to 100 miles (160 km) behind German lines in an attempt to capture a series of bridges over the Maas, Waal and Rhine Rivers, in an attempt to outflank German fortifications and penetrate into Germany. The operation was hastily planned and many key planning tasks were inadequately completed. Three complete airborne divisions executed Operation Market, the airborne phase. These were the British 1st Airborne Division, the U.S. 82nd and 101st Airborne Divisions, as well as the Polish 1st Independent Parachute Brigade. All units were landed or dropped at various points along Highway 69 ("Hell's Highway") in order to create a "carpet" over which the British XXX Corps could rapidly advance in Operation Garden, the land phase. It was a daylight assault, with little initial opposition, and most units achieved high accuracy on drop and landing zones. In the end, after strong German counterattacks, the overall plan failed: the British 1st Airborne Division was all but destroyed at Arnhem, and the final Rhine bridge remained in German hands.

===== Operation Repulse: re-supply of Bastogne =====
Operation Repulse, which took place in Bastogne on 23, 24, 26 and 27 December 1944, as part of the Battle of the Bulge, glider pilots, although flying directly through enemy fire, were able to land, delivering the badly needed ammunition, gasoline and medical supplies that enabled defenders against the German offensive to persevere and secure the ultimate victory.

===== Operation Varsity: The Rhine Crossing =====
Operation Varsity was a daylight assault conducted by two airborne divisions, the British 6th Airborne Division and the U.S. 17th Airborne Division, both of which were part of the U.S. XVIII Airborne Corps. Conducted as a part of Operation Plunder, the operation took place on 24 March 1945 in aid of an attempt by the Anglo-Canadian 21st Army Group to cross the Rhine River. Having learnt from the heavy casualties inflicted upon the airborne formations in Operation Market Garden, the two airborne divisions were dropped several thousand yards forward of friendly positions, and only some thirteen hours after Operation Plunder had begun and Allied ground forces had already crossed the Rhine. There was heavy resistance in some of the areas that the airborne troops landed in, with casualties actually statistically heavier than those incurred during Operation Market Garden. The British military historian Max Hastings has labelled the operation both costly and unnecessary, writing that "Operation Varsity was a folly for which more than a thousand men paid for with their lives ..."

==== Pacific Theater ====
The following airborne operations against the Japanese are famous.

===== New Guinea =====
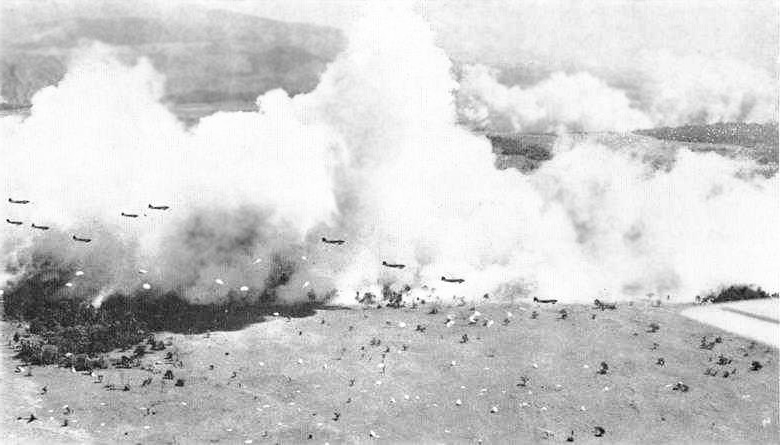
5 September 1943. C-47 transport planes, silhouetted against clouds of smoke created to provide cover, drop a battalion of the U.S. 503d Parachute Regiment and elements of the Australian Army's 2/4th Field Regiment at Nadzab, New Guinea, during the Battle of Lae. A battalion dropped minutes earlier is landing in the foreground.

In September 1943, in New Guinea, the U.S. Army's 503rd Parachute Infantry Regiment and elements of the Australian Army's 2/4th Field Regiment made a highly successful, unopposed landing at Nadzab, during the Salamaua-Lae campaign. This was the first Allied airborne assault in the Pacific Theater.

In July 1944, the 503rd jumped again, onto Noemfoor Island, off Dutch New Guinea, in the Battle of Noemfoor.

===== Philippines =====
The honors for recapturing the Rock went to the 503rd Parachute Regimental Combat Team of Lieutenant Colonel George M. Jones and elements of Major General Roscoe B. Woodruff's 24th Infantry Division, the same units which undertook the capture of Mindoro island. The U.S. 503rd Parachute Infantry Regiment's most famous operation was a landing on Corregidor ("The Rock") in February 1945, during the Philippines campaign of 1944–45.

The U.S. Army's 11th Airborne Division saw a great deal of action in the Philippines as a ground unit. The 511th Parachute Infantry Regiment made the division's first jump near Tagaytay Ridge on 3 February 1945, meeting no resistance at the drop zone. Elements of the division also jumped to liberate 2,000 Allied civilians interned at Los Baños, 23 February 1945. The final operation of the division was conducted on 23 June 1945, in conjunction with an advance by U.S. ground forces in northern Luzon. A task force from the 11th was formed and jumped on Camalaniugan Airfield, south of Aparri.

===== Burma =====
A large British force, known as the Chindits, operated behind Japanese lines during 1944. In Operation Thursday, most of the units were flown into landing grounds which had been seized by glider infantry transported by the American 1st Air Commando Group, commencing on 5 March. Aircraft continued to land reinforcements at captured or hastily constructed landing strips until monsoon rains made them unusable. Small detachments were subsequently landed by parachute. The operation eventually wound down in July, with the exhausted Chindits making their way overland to link up with advancing American and Chinese forces.

For Operation Dracula, an ad hoc parachute battalion group made up of personnel from the 153 and 154 (Gurkha) Parachute Battalions of the Indian Army secured Japanese coastal defences, which enabled the seaborne assault by the 26th Indian Infantry Division to attain its objectives with a minimum of casualties and time.

== Ecuadorian–Peruvian War ==
During the Ecuadorian–Peruvian War, the Peruvian army established its own paratrooper unit and used it to great effect by seizing the Ecuadorian port city of Puerto Bolívar, on 27 July 1941, marking the first time in the Americas that airborne troops were used in combat.

== After World War II ==
=== Indonesian War of Independence ===
The Dutch Korps Speciale Troepen made two combat jumps during the Indonesian War of Independence. The first jump was as part of Operation Kraai: the capture of Yogyakarta, and the capture of Sukarno and Mohammad Hatta on 19 and 20 December 1948. The second combat jump happened during Operation Ekster: the capture of Jambi and the oilfields surrounding is, on Sumatra from 29 December 1948 to 23 January 1949. From the Indonesian side, the first airborne operation was an airborne-infiltration operation by 14 paratroopers on 17 October 1947, in Kotawaringin, Kalimantan.

=== Korean War ===
The 187th Airborne Regimental Combat Team ("Rakkasans") made two combat jumps in Korea during the Korean War. The first combat jump was made on 20 October 1950, at Sunchon and Sukchon, North Korea. The missions of the 187th were to cut the road north going to China, preventing North Korean leaders from escaping from Pyongyang; and to rescue American prisoners of war.

The second combat jump was made on Wednesday, 21 March 1951, at Munsan-ni, South Korea codenamed Operation Tomahawk. The mission was to get behind Chinese forces and block their movement north. The Indian Army 60th Parachute Field Ambulance provided the medical cover for the operations, dropping an ADS and a surgical team totalling 7 officers and 5 other ranks, treating over 400 battle casualties apart from the civilian casualties that formed the core of their objective as the unit was on a humanitarian mission. The unit was to become the longest-serving military unit in any UN operation till date, serving from October 1950 till May 1953, a total of three and a half years, returning home to a heroes' welcome.

The 187th served in six campaigns in Korea. Shortly after the war the 187th ARCT was considered for use in an Airborne drop to relieve the surrounded French garrison at Dien Bien Phu in Vietnam but the United States, at that time, decided not to send its troops into the combat zone.

The unit was assigned to the reactivated 101st Airborne Division and subsequently inactivated as a combat team in 1956 as part of the division's reorganization into the Pentomic structure, which featured battle groups in place of regiments and battalions. The 1st and 3rd Battalions, 187th Infantry, bearing the lineages of the former Co A and Co C, 187AIR, are now with the 101st Airborne Division as air assault units.

=== First Indochina War ===
The French used paratroopers extensively during their 1946-54 war against the Viet Minh. Troupes de marine, Foreign Legion and colonial Vietnamese units took part in numerous operations such as Operation Lea (1947), One of the first large-scale airborne operations in the conflict, French paratroopers landed at Bắc Kạn in an attempt to capture General Võ Nguyên Giáp and disrupt Viet Minh command, While tactically successful in scattering the Viet Minh and capturing equipment, Giáp escaped, and the operation failed to deliver a decisive blow, The Battle of Nà Sản (1952), where they were able to secure a key defensive victory using the Hedgehog Defense tactic or (le hérisson) for the first time in Indochina, Operation Hirondelle (1953) was a focused raid to destroy Viet Minh supply depots near Lạng Sơn, Paratroopers successfully disrupted Viet Minh logistics by destroying hidden supply caches, Despite achieving several tactical successes through their elite training and mobility, the paratroopers' efforts were frequently countered by the Viet Minh's adaptability and logistical constraints, were to culminate in the disastrous siege of Dien Bien Phu.

=== Suez crisis: Operations Machbesh & Musketeer ===
Launching the 1956 Suez War, on 29 October 1956, Israeli paratroopers led by Ariel Sharon dropped onto the important Mitla Pass to cut off and engage Egyptian forces. Operation Machbesh (Press) was the IDF's first and largest combat parachute drop.

A few days later, Operation Musketeer needed the element of total surprise to succeed, and all 660 men had to be on the ground at El Gamil airfield and ready for action within four and a half minutes. At 04.15 hours on 5 November 1956, British 3rd Battalion, Parachute Regiment jumped in and although opposition was heavy, casualties were few. Meanwhile, French paratroopers of the 2nd Marine Infantry Parachute Regiment under the command of Colonel Chateau-Jobert jumped on the water treatment factory South of Port Said.

The landings from the sea the next day saw the first large-scale heliborne assault, as 45 Commando, Royal Marines were landed by helicopters in Port Said from ships offshore. Both the British and the French accomplished total military victory against the disorganized Egyptian military and local armed civilians but political events forced total retreat of these forces after 48 hours of fighting.

=== Indo-Pakistani War of 1965 ===
Paratroopers were used in combat in South Asia after the Second World War during the Indo-Pakistan War of 1947, Indian Annexation of Goa in 1961 and Indo-Pakistani War of 1965. The war in 1965 had the largest use of paratrooper forces, and unlike in previous conflicts, they were used in their intended capacity fully (They were not used in the airborne capacity in 1961, and it is unconfirmed in 1947). A covert operation was launched by the Pakistani Army with the intention of infiltrating Indian airbases and sabotaging them. The SSG (Special Service Group) commandos, were parachuted into Indian territory. Of the 180 para-commandos dropped, 138, including all officers but one, were captured and safely taken to prisoner of war (POW) camps. Twenty-two were killed, or rather lynched by joint combing teams of villagers armed with sticks, police and even bands of muleteers released by the Army, from the animal transport battalion of the nearby Corps headquarters.

Only 20 para-commandos were unaccounted for and most escaped back to Pakistan under the fog. Most of these were from the Pathankot group, dropped less than 10 km from the border in an area that had plenty of ravines, riverine tracks to navigate back along.

The War also saw the establishment of the first Indian Airborne Special Forces Unit - The Meghdoot Force - which was tasked with operations behind Pakistani Lines. This force is the predecessor to the modern India Para commando (SF) units, and had a major influence on modern Indian Special forces units.

=== Bangladesh Liberation War of 1971 ===
During the Bangladesh Liberation War of 1971, the Parachute Regiment of the Indian Army fought in numerous contacts in both the Eastern and Western Theatres. On 11 December, India airdropped the 2nd battalion (2 Para) in what is now famous as the Tangail airdrop. The paratroop unit was instrumental in denying the retreat and regrouping of the Pakistani Army and contributed substantially to the early collapse of Dhaka via covert operations. The regiment earned the battle honours of Poongli Bridge, Chachro and Defence of Poonch—during these operations.

=== Indonesian Invasion of East Timor ===
The Indonesian Army used airborne troops in their 1975 invasion of East Timor. Following a naval bombardment of Dili, on 7 December 1975, Indonesian seaborne troops landed in the city while paratroops simultaneously descended on the city. 641 Indonesian paratroopers jumped into Dili, where they engaged in six-hours combat with East Timorese gunmen.

=== Vietnam War ===
In 1963, in the Battle of Ap Bac, ARVN forces delivered airborne troops by helicopter and air drop, to little effect. The use of helicopter-borne airmobile troops by the United States Army in the Vietnam War was widespread, and became an iconic image featuring in newsreels and movies about the conflict.

In February 1967 Operation Junction City was launched, it would be the largest operation the Allied forces would assemble. During this operation, 845 members of the 2nd Battalion, 503rd Airmen (Airborne), the 319th Artillery (Airborne), and elements of H&H company of the 173rd Airborne Brigade made the only combat jump in Vietnam.

=== Rhodesian Bush War ===
The men of the Rhodesian Light Infantry made more parachute jumps than any other military unit in history. While an Allied paratrooper of the Second World War would be considered a "veteran" after one operational jump, an RLI paratrooper could make three operational jumps in a single day, each in a different location, and each preceding a successful contact with the enemy. Between 1976 and 1980, over 14,000 jumps were recorded by the Rhodesian Security Forces as a whole.

The world record for operational jumps by an individual soldier is held by Corporal Des Archer of 1 Commando, RLI, who made 73 operational jumps between 1977 and the end of the war.

Fireforce is a variant of the tactic of vertical envelopment of a target by helicopter-borne and small groups of parachute infantry developed by the Rhodesian Security Force.

Fireforce counter-insurgency missions were designed to trap and eliminate insurgents before they could flee. The Rhodesian Security Force could react quickly to insurgent ambushes, farm attacks, Observation Post sightings, and could also be called in as reinforcements by trackers or patrols which made contact with the enemy. It was first deployed in January 1974 and saw its first action a month later on 24 February 1974. By the end of Rhodesian operations with internal peace agreements, Fireforce was a well-developed counterinsurgency tactic.

Fireforce was an operational assault or response usually composed of a first wave of 32 soldiers carried to the scene by three Alouette III helicopters and one Dakota transport aircraft, with another Alouette III helicopter as a command/gunship aircraft and a light attack aircraft in support. One of the advantages of the Fireforce was its flexibility as all that was needed was a reasonable airstrip. It was such a successful tactic that some Rhodesian Light Infantry soldiers reputedly made as many as three parachute combat jumps in one day.

=== Angolan Bush War: Cassinga ===
During the War in Angola, paratroopers of the South African Army attacked a South West Africa People's Organization (SWAPO) military base at the former town of Cassinga, Angola on 4 May 1978. Conducted as one of the three major actions of Operation Reindeer during the South African Border War, it was the South African Army's first major airborne assault.

=== Soviet and Russian VDV ===
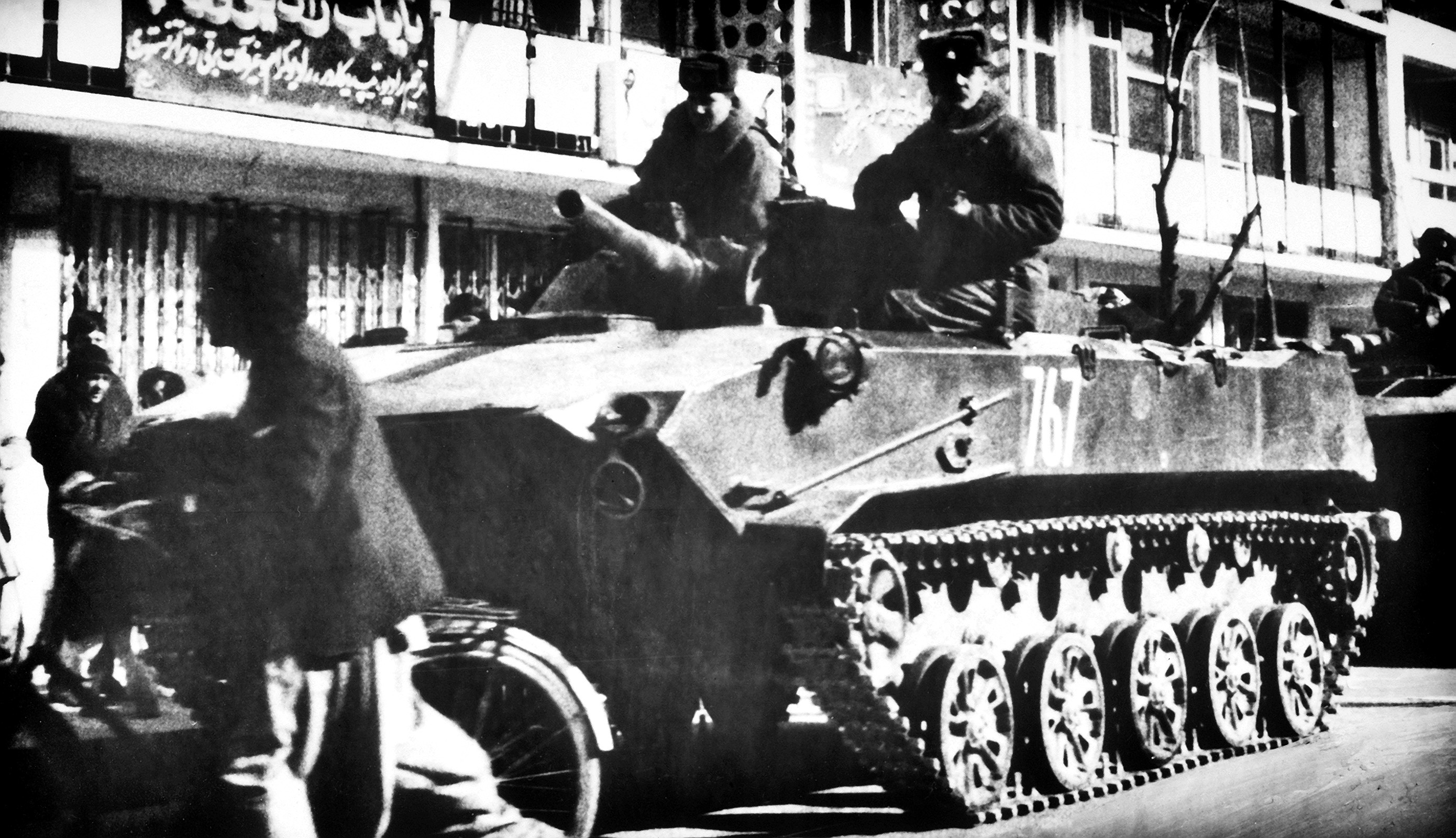
A BMD-1 in Kabul, Afghanistan, 1986

The Soviet Union maintained the world's largest airborne force during the Cold War, consisting of seven airborne divisions and a training division. The VDV was subordinated directly to the Ministry of Defense of USSR, and was a 'prestige service' in the armed forces of the USSR and Russia to reflect its strategic purpose. Recruits received much more rigorous training and better equipment than ordinary Soviet units. Unlike most airborne forces, which are a light infantry force, VDV has evolved into a fully mechanized parachute-deployed force thanks to its use of BMD-series light IFVs, BTR-D armoured carriers, 2S9 Nona self-propelled 120 mm gun-howitzer-mortars and 2S25 Sprut-SD 125 mm tank destroyers.

The VDV have participated in virtually all Soviet and Russian conflicts since the Second World War, including the Soviet–Afghan War. As an elite force, the VDV developed two distinctive items of clothing: the telnyashka, or striped shirt, and the famous blue beret. Airborne assault (десантно-штурмовые войска or DShV) units wore similar striped shirts (as did the naval infantry) but used helicopters, rather than the Military Transport Aviation's An-12s, An-22s, and Il-76s, which carried the airborne troops and their equipment.

==== Russian Airborne Troops ====
The Russian Airborne Forces (VDV) have played a major role throughout the Russia–Ukraine war. Before 2022, they were considered some of Russia's most elite troops, trained for airborne assaults, rapid deployment, and high-intensity combat. During the war, however, they suffered very heavy losses and gradually shifted from elite paratrooper operations into more conventional infantry roles. Some of the best-known VDV operations were during the opening invasion in February 2022:

- The attempted seizure of Hostomel Airport near Kyiv.
- Helicopter air assaults around Kyiv and Kharkiv.
- Rapid operations in southern Ukraine, including crossings near Kherson.

At Hostomel, Russian airborne troops initially captured parts of the airport, but Ukrainian forces counterattacked and prevented Russia from fully using it as an air bridge for reinforcements. Many analysts later described this as one of the key failures of Russia's early invasion strategy. Russian airborne forces were also deployed deep inside Chernigov Oblast and Mykolaiv Oblast 60 kilometer behind enemy positions. Russian airborne were repeatedly redeployed to critical sectors because Russia viewed them as more capable than regular infantry units. However, Western military assessments and some Russian military commentators argued that the VDV lost much of its pre-war "elite" status as airborne assaults became increasingly dangerous in the face of modern air defenses. Heavy casualties among experienced personnel, combined with the prolonged use of elite airborne units as conventional frontline infantry, further diminished their effectiveness and distinctiveness as an elite force.

The war also changed Russian doctrine. Instead of large airborne operations, Russia increasingly relied on drones, artillery, small assault groups, and mechanized infantry tactics. By 2025–2026, VDV units were still considered among Russia's better-trained formations, but they were often used as rapid-reaction ground troops rather than classic parachute forces. Recent reports show VDV units being moved between fronts to stabilize difficult situations, especially in Kherson and Zaporizhia fronts. Russian airborne divisions are:

- 76th Guards Air Assault Division
- 98th Guards Airborne Division
- 106th Guards Airborne Division

=== Soviet Glider Infantry ===
The Soviets maintained three glider infantry regiments until 1965.

=== Operation Meghdoot ===
Operation Meghdoot (lit. "Operation Cloud Messenger"), launched in the early hours of 13 April 1984, was the codename given to the preemptive strike launched by the Indian Armed Forces' to gain control of the Siachen Glacier in Kashmir, precipitating the Siachen conflict.

Executed in the highest battlefield in the world, Meghdoot was the first ever military offensive of its kind. The operation was a success, resulting in Indian forces gaining control of the Siachen Glacier in its entirety.

=== Recent history ===
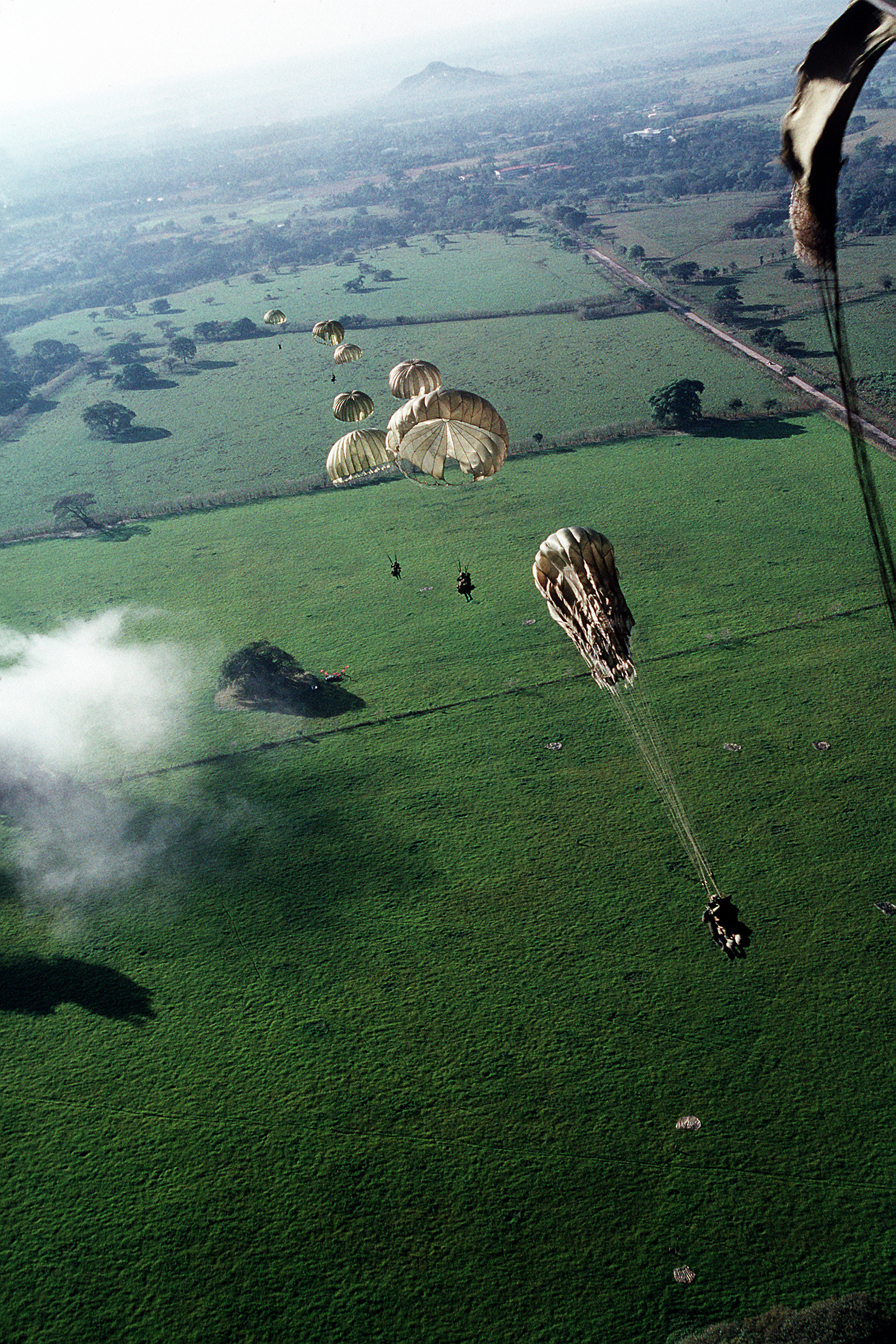
Elements of 1st Bn, 508th Infantry parachuting onto a drop zone, outside of Panama City in support of Operation Just Cause.

With the advantages of helicopter use, airborne forces have dwindled in numbers in recent years.

- On 20 July 1974, several landings took place at north of Nicosia, during Operation Atilla.
- The Battle of Kolwezi was an airborne operation by the French 2nd Foreign Parachute Regiment and Belgian Paracommando Regiment that took place in May 1978 in Zaire during the Shaba II invasion of Zaire by the Front for the National Liberation of the Congo (FLNC). It aimed at rescuing European and Zairean hostages held by FLNC rebels after they conquered the city of Kolwezi. The operation succeeded with the liberation of the hostages and light military casualties.
- During the 1983 Invasion of Grenada, the 75th Ranger Regiment made a combat jump on Point Salines International Airport.
- In 1989 during the U.S invasion of Panama the U.S. 82nd Airborne Division made its first combat jump in over 40 years. The 1st Brigade of the 82nd secured Omar Torrijos International Airport in Tocumen, Panama. The jump followed the 1st Ranger Battalion(+) of the 75th Ranger Regiment's combat jump onto the airfield. M551 Sheridan tanks were also dropped by air, the only time this capability was used in combat. At the same time as the combat jump onto Omar Torrijos International Airport, the 2nd and 3rd(-) Ranger Battalions, along with the 75th Ranger Regiment regimental headquarters, conducted a combat jump onto Rio Hato Airport.
- On 16 September 1994, elements of the U.S. 82nd Airborne Division planned to jump into Port-au-Prince Airport in Haiti as part of Operation Restore Democracy, an effort to overthrow the military dictatorship of Raoul Cédras, and to restore the democratically elected president, Jean-Bertrand Aristide. As they were already in the air to be deployed over the target, Cédras finally stepped down from his rule in part due to the diplomatic efforts led by former President Jimmy Carter, averting the entire mission.
- On 19 October 2001, as part of Operation Enduring Freedom, the 3rd Ranger Battalion and a small command and control element from the regimental headquarters of the 75th Ranger Regiment jumped into Kandahar to secure an airfield.
- On 23 March 2003, 3/75 Ranger Regiment conducted a combat jump into northern Iraq to seize a desert airfield.
- On 26 March 2003, the U.S. 173rd Airborne Brigade conducted a combat jump into northern Iraq, during the 2003 invasion of Iraq, to seize an airfield and support special forces (Task Force Viking). The paratroopers departed from Aviano Air Base, Italy on fifteen C-17s.
- On 14 May 2008, the People's Liberation Army Air Force Airborne Corps was deployed to provide intel and aid to Mao County and Wenchuan County which became inaccessible due to the 2008 Sichuan earthquake.
- In 2009, Pakistan Army's paratroopers conducted combat jump operations during Operation Black Thunderstorm and Operation Rah-e-Nijat against the Pakistani Taliban in northwest Pakistan, to seize control of strategic mountain areas in order to support special forces and infantry troops.
- In January 2013, 250 French paratroopers from the 11th Parachute Brigade jumped into northern Mali to support an offensive to capture the city of Timbuktu.

== Doctrine ==
- NATO Tactical Air Doctrine ATP-33 B

British Parawings. Wings are a symbol commonly worn by airborne forces.

== See also ==
- Airborne gun
- High-altitude military parachuting
- List of airborne artillery units
- List of paratrooper forces
- Pathfinder (military)
