= List of airborne artillery units =

Airborne artillery units provide artillery support to airborne forces.

== A ==
- Australia
  - 'A' Field Battery, Royal Australian Artillery
- Argentina
  - 4th Paratrooper Artillery Group

== B ==
- Brazil
  - 8th Group Artillery Pára-que
  - 21st Battery Anti-Aérea Pára-que

== C ==
- China (People’s Republic of China)
  - Light Artillery Regiment, 43rd Parachute Division
  - Light Artillery Regiment, 44th Parachute Division
  - Light Artillery Regiment, 45th Parachute Division

== F ==
- France
  - 35^{e} Régiment d'Artillerie Parachutiste

== G ==
- Germany
  - Light Air Defence Battery (Airborne) 100
- Greece
  - 116th Airmobile Artillery Squadron
  - 71st Light Air Defence Battery

== I ==
- India
  - 9 Para Field Regiment
  - 17 (Parachute) Field Regiment (Zojila & Poongali Bridge)
- Indonesia
  - Batalyon Artileri Medan 9 (Para)
  - Batalyon Artileri Medan 10 (Para)
  - Batalyon Artileri Medan 13 (Para)
- Italy
  - 185th Paratroopers Artillery Regiment "Folgore"

== J ==
- Japan
  - Narashino Airborne Brigade Field Artillery Battalion

== M ==
- Malaysia
  - Rejimen Pertama Artileri Diraja (PARA)
  - 361 Bti Rejimen Artileri Diraja (PARA)

== N ==
- Netherlands
  - 11 Air Defense Company (Air Assault) Samarinda

== R ==
- Russia
  - 1137th Guards Artillery Regiment
  - 1140th Guards Artillery Regiment
  - 1065th Guards Artillery Regiment
  - 1182nd Guards Artillery Regiment
  - 1120th Training Artillery Regiment

== S ==
- South Africa
  - 18 Light Regiment of 44 Parachute Brigade, South African Defence Force
- Spain
  - 6th Parachute Artillery Battalion Paracaidista

== U ==
- Ukraine
  - 25th Separate Dnipropetrovsk Airborne Brigade Artillery Group and Anti-Aircraft Artillery Battalion
  - 95th Airmobile Brigade Artillery Battalion
- United Kingdom
  - 7th Parachute Regiment Royal Horse Artillery
- United States of America
  - 319th Airborne Field Artillery Regiment (1st, 2nd, 3rd) and 4th Battalions.
  - 2nd Battalion, 321st Airborne Field Artillery Regiment
  - 2nd Battalion (Airborne), 377th Field Artillery Regiment (Brigade Combat Team (Airborne), 25th Infantry Division)
  - 18th Fires Brigade
