= 17 (Parachute) Field Regiment (India) =

Indian Army artillery unit

17 Parachute Field Regiment
- Active: 1941 – present
- Country: India
- Allegiance: British India; India
- Branch: British Indian Army; Indian Army
- Type: Artillery
- Size: Regiment
- Mottos: SARVATRA, IZZAT-O-IQBAL "Everywhere with Honour and Glory".
- Colors: "Red & Navy Blue"
- Decorations: Vir Chakra 1 Shaurya Chakra 3 Sena Medal 7 Mention in Despatches 10; COAS Commendation Card 34; VCOAS Commendation Card 14; GOC-in-C Commendation Card 32; AOC (J&K) Commendation Card 1 UN Force Commander Citation 13; UN Brigade Commanded Citation / Appreciation 35
- Battle honours: Zojila, Poongli Bridge

Commanders
- Notable commanders: Lt Gen JK Khanna PVSM, MC; Lt Gen Arjun Singh Khanna PVSM, AVSM, VrC; Lt Gen KK Hazari, PVSM, AVSM; Lt Gen KM Seth, PVSM, AVSM; Lt Gen VG Patankar, PVSM, UYSM, VSM; Maj Gen VB Batra

Insignia
- Abbreviation: 17 Para Fd Regt

17 Parachute Field Regiment (Zojila & Poongli Bridge) is part of the Regiment of Artillery of the Indian Army.

== Formation ==
17 Parachute Field Regiment was raised as the 8th Battalion, the 7th Rajput Regiment on 1 February 1941 at Fatehgarh by Major DW Dawson.

== History ==
The Regiment moved to Calcutta on 7 January 1942. On 1 February 1942, the battalion was converted and redesignated as 7 Rajput Heavy Anti-Aircraft Regiment.

On 19 December 1945, the Regiment was converted to a Field Artillery Regiment and was redesignated as 17 (Independent) Field Regiment RIA. On 3 November 1946, it was converted to a Parachute Field Regiment and was designated as 17 Parachute Field Regiment RIA with Lieutenant Colonel DHN Baker Carr as its Commanding Officer. The Regiment became part of the 2nd Indian Airborne Division (previously 44th Indian Airborne Division) at Karachi. After partition, the Regiment moved to Khadakwasla, Poona. Lieutenant Colonel JK Khanna, MC became the first Indian Commanding Officer on 22 October 1947.

The regiment consists of the 49, 51 and 52 Field Batteries.

== Operations ==
World War II
The Regiment saw its action as an outcome of the bombing by Japanese aircraft on its location. On 24 December 1942, 20 Battery shot down one enemy aircraft. On 25 June 1943, the Regiment moved to Assam and fought against the Japanese.
Indo-Pakistani War of 1947–1948
The Regiment moved to Srinagar on 6 October 1948 to be part of the operations in Zojila. The guns of the Regiment were instrumental in its capture, for which it was awarded the honour title Zojila

Annexation of Goa
On 30 November 1961, the Regiment received orders to move to Goa. The Regiment as part of the 50th Parachute Brigade moved in on 2 December and by 17 December, 49, 51 and 52 Field Batteries were deployed. The guns directed fire on the Portuguese posts on 18 and 19 December. The Portuguese withdrew and surrendered on 19 December.

Sino-Indian War
In 1961, as tensions between India and China rose, elements of the para brigade patrolled the Chinese frontier. When war erupted, the Regiment was the only airborne unit sent to battle. On 6 October 1962, men from the Regiment were flown by helicopter to the North East in Tsangdhar, where they bought two field guns into action (Operation Leghorn). This section was eventually overrun and taken prisoner. The remainder of the Regiment was employed in the defence of the town of Walong along with 71 Heavy Mortar Battery.
Indo-Pak War (1965)
The initial skirmish occurred in the Rann of Kutch during the months of January to June 1965 wherein Pakistan launched a well-planned attack on the Indian post at Biār Bet with overwhelming numbers, supported by armour and artillery. On 11 April 1965, the Regiment received its mobilisation orders to the Rann of Kutch. It saw action on 24 and 25 April in Biār Bet in support of C Company of 2 Parachute Battalion. 2nd Lieutenant AS Khanna was awarded the Vir Chakra in recognition of his effort to direct fire at the Pakistani intrusion. The Regiment moved to Tarn Taran on 9 September 1965. 51 and 52 Para Field Batteries provide artillery support to the attack by 6 Kumaon Regiment in Raniyan. On 14 September, the Regiment was ordered to move to the Grand Trunk Road Axis and re-join the Parachute Brigade, which was tasked to capture the Upper Bari Doab Canal and Ichhogil bridgehead on Grand Trunk Road. On 20 September 1965, the Regiment provided artillery support to the 3 Para Battalion.

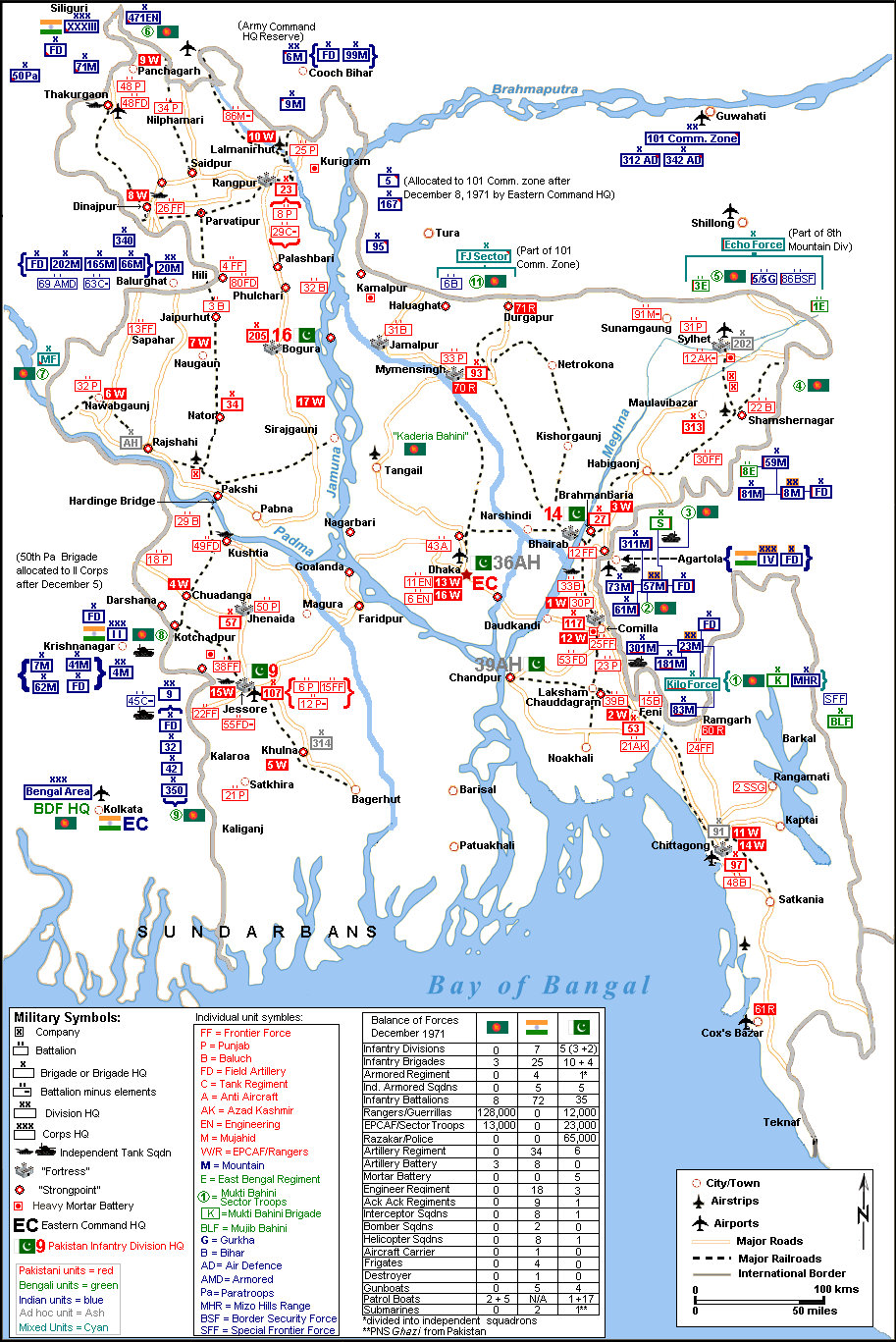
Deployment of troops in the eastern sector during the 1971 war

Indo-Pakistani War of 1971
On 16 November 1971, the 51 and 52 Parachute Field Batteries moved from Calcutta to a border location east of Basirhat in support of 1/3 Gorkha Rifles. 49 Parachute Field Battery was part of the 2 Parachute Battalion Group under Lt Col KS Pannu which executed the Tangail para-drop around dusk on 11 December. The mission was to capture the Poongli bridge and cut off the 93 Brigade of Pakistan Army, which was retreating from the north to defend Dacca and its approaches. Unfortunately, the artillery the drop got spread over 20 km area, some guns and ammunition landing into ponds. Notwithstanding the problems, four guns were made operational quickly and the enemy was engaged. By midnight, 2 Parachute Battalion captured Poongli bridge on the Tangail – Dacca road, but were counterattacked by the enemy thrice during the night. Fierce enemy attacks were defeated mostly due to continuous artillery salvos fired on the enemy by 49 Parachute Field Battery. 2 Parachute Battalion with 49 Parachute Field Battery entered Dacca at 1130 hours on 16 December followed by 851 Light Battery and 852 Light Battery. They witnessed the historic surrender by Lt Gen AAK Niazi to Lt Gen JS Aurora. Military history commentators often refer to Indian paratroopers dropping from aircraft near Tangail as one of the decisive factor of the operations in the East Pakistan and surrender by Lt Gen AAK Niazi. For their decisive role in the battle, the Regiment was awarded the honour title Poongli Bridge.

Operation Pawan
The Regiment less 52 Field Battery were part of the Indian Peace Keeping Force in Sri Lanka.
Operation Cactus 1988, Maldives
With the capture of Maldives on 3 November 1988 by the People's Liberation Organisation of Tamil Eelam (PLOTE) mercenaries, the army turned to the 50 (Independent) Parachute Brigade to carry out an airborne/air transported operation to liberate the country and return power to the legal government. This operation had 6th Battalion of the Parachute Regiment and the 17 (Para) Field Regiment spearheading the mission. They flew in on 4 November 1988 in a fleet of IL-76, An-32 and An-12 transport aircraft. One team rescued the president, another took over the airfield, and a third rescued Maldivian security personnel besieged in the National Security Service HQ. When mercenaries tried to escape by sea along with hostages, they were intercepted by the Indian navy. Thus, 6 Para, and the 17 (Para) Field Regiment conducted the first-ever international intervention by the Indian army without any loss of life.
Counter Insurgency Operations
17 (Para) Field Regiment was inducted into insurgency prone North Cachar Hill region in Assam and Jiribam in Manipur in 2000. Its exceptional management of the environment and relentless operations against the terrorists resulted in enviable operational results. In a short time, the operational successes against National Socialist Council of Nagaland counted over twenty-five elimination of militants, more than forty apprehensions and recovery of over forty-five weapons that included modern automatic weapons. The unit was awarded the prestigious Chief of Army Staff Unit Citation for successful counter insurgency tenure in the North East. Major Sameerul Islam and Major Vijit Kumar Singh were posthumously awarded the Shaurya Chakra for their acts of bravery during the counter insurgency operations. Colonel Deepak Dhanda, Major Pramod VO, Captain Saminder Mor, Havildar Fulbir Singh and Lance Naik Antony PA were awarded the Sena Medal. In addition, the Regiment won 20 Chief of Army Staff Commendation Cards and 12 GOC-in-C Commendation Cards.

Siachen Glacier
The Regiment had two tenures in the Siachen Glacier as part of Operation Meghdoot and won the GOC-in-C (Northern Command) Unit Appreciation on 15 August 2009.

United Nations
The Regiment took part in the United Nations Organization Stabilization Mission in the Democratic Republic of the Congo or MONUSCO and United Nations Disengagement Observer Force (UNDOF) in Golan Heights between 2011 and 2014. The Regiment received the Force Commander's Unit Citation.

== See also ==
- List of artillery regiments of Indian Army
- 9 Parachute Field Regiment
- 50 Parachute Brigade
