= 9 (Parachute) Field Regiment (India) =

Indian Army artillery unit

9 Parachute Field Regiment
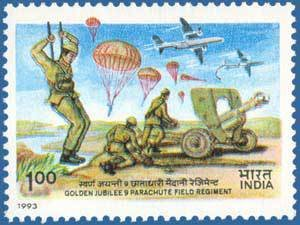
- Active: 1943–present
- Country: India
- Allegiance: British India; India
- Branch: British Indian Army; Indian Army
- Type: Artillery
- Size: Regiment
- Nickname: Niners
- Mottos: Sarvatra, Izzat-O-Iqbal "Everywhere with Honour and Glory" "Josh Aur Hosh, Sada Aage"
- Colors: Red and navy blue

Insignia
- Abbreviation: 9 Para Fd Regt

9 Parachute Field Regiment is part of the Regiment of Artillery of the Indian Army.

== Formation ==
9 Parachute Field Regiment was raised on 1 April 1943 at Kumbergaon, Pune, by Lieutenant Colonel R. A. Eden as 9 Field Regiment of the Royal Indian Artillery, British Indian Army.

== History ==
The unit was raised as a pure Madrasi unit and was converted to become the first Parachute Field Regiment in the Indian Army in November 1945. The unit briefly formed part of the 2nd Indian Airborne Division (previously 44th Indian Airborne Division), while located in Quetta, prior to independence. Between 1946 and 1948, it was involved in internal security duties at Quetta, Karachi and Satara.

Following the partition, the regiment was allotted to India. The first Indian commanding officer post independence, in 1947, was Lieutenant Colonel (later Brigadier) FSB Mehta, an Army Aviator.

The regiment along with 17 (Parachute) Field Regiment alternatively form part of the 50th Parachute Brigade, while the other serves out its field tenure on rotation.

== Operations ==
Following independence, the unit has been involved in numerous operations including:

Operation Polo (Annexation of Hyderabad)
In 1948, when the state of Hyderabad was annexed by India; the regiment was part of the 7th Infantry Brigade (Kill Force).
Operation Vijay (Annexation of Goa)
In 1961, the regiment took part in the operations which ended the Portuguese colonial rule in Goa, the culmination of which was the capture of Daman.
Operation Cactus Lily (Indo-Pakistani War of 1971)
The regiment had for the second time changed over to the Parachute Field in 1966 and played an extremely important role in the war. It took part in the capture of Nagi Post in Sriganganagar Sector. On December 25 and 26, 1971, Pakistani forces had occupied the Indian territory at Nagi, a small village located in vicinity of the international boundary near Karanpur, after announcement of the ceasefire on December 16. Indian Army units – 4th Battalion, Parachute Regiment, 9 Parachute Field Regiment and 410 Field Company under 51 Parachute Brigade effectively supported by 18 Cavalry, evicted the enemy in a swift operation on December 28.
Other operations
The regiment during its field tenures has taken part in counter-insurgency operations and internal security duties in Assam between 1982 and 1983 (Operation Rhino) and in Kashmir Valley in 1988 as part of 'Operation Rakshak'. It also participated as one of the parties that captured the Siachen Glacier under 'Operation Meghdoot'. It took part in 'Operation Hifazat' – counter-insurgency operations in Tripura, Manipur's Jiribam subdivision and adjoining Cachar district; Operation All Clear and Operation Falcon.

== Notable officers ==
The unit boasts of having 56 of its officers becoming Flag officers, including:

- Lieutenant General Sir William Gregory Huddleston Pike KCB, CBE, DSO – commanded the regiment and eventually became the Vice Chief of the Imperial General Staff.
- Brigadier Furdoon Siavax Byramji Mehta – first Indian Artillery officer to wear the wings of the Air Observation Post (Air OP), now known as Army Aviation Corps, first Indian commanding officer of 9 Parachute Field Regiment, believed to be the only Indian officer to have flown with a British Air Observation Post Squadron in the Second World War.
- General Sunith Francis Rodrigues PVSM, VSM – Chief of the Army Staff of the Indian Army from 1990 to 1993 and Governor of Punjab from 2004 to 2010.

== Gallantry awards and honours ==
- The regiment holds the coveted honour of getting four unit citations. The regiment was honoured with the Chief of Army Staff Unit Citation in January 2025.
- Vishisht Seva Medal – Major Chandra Shekhar Manda
- Sena Medal – Major Vikesh Kumar
- COAS Commendation Cards

== See also ==
- List of artillery regiments of Indian Army
- 17 (Parachute) Field Regiment
- 50 Parachute Brigade
