= 50th Parachute Brigade =

Indian airborne unit

50th (Independent) Parachute Brigade
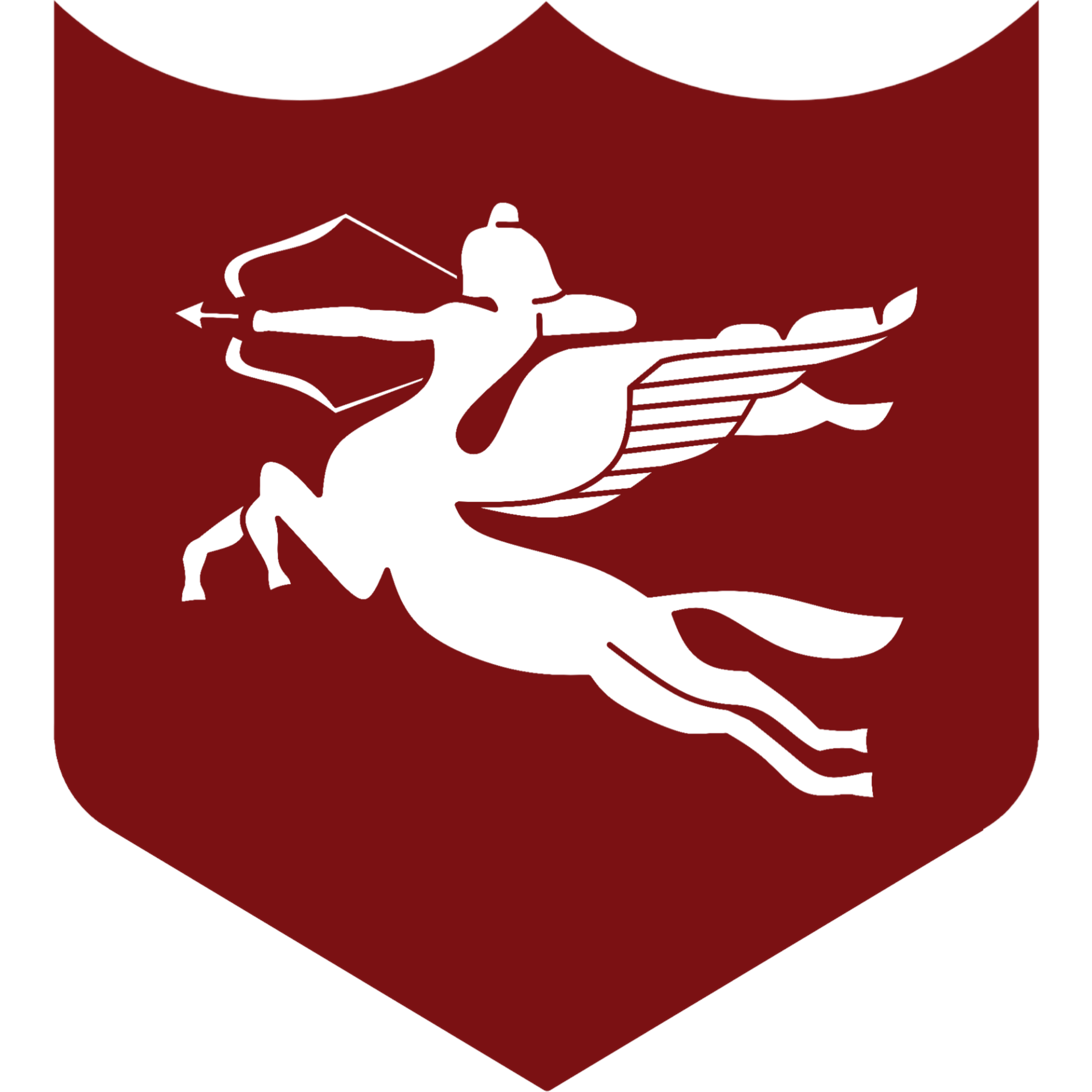
- Badge of the 50th Parachute Brigade
- Active: 1941 – present
- Country: British India (1941–1947); India (1947–present)
- Branch: British Indian Army (1941–1947); Indian Army (1947–present)
- Type: Airborne forces
- Size: Brigade
- Headquarters: Agra
- Nickname: Shatrujeet Brigade
- Mascot: Centaur
- Anniversaries: Raising day : 26 October
- Engagements: Burma Campaign; 1961 Indian Annexation of Goa; Operation Cactus; Operation Vijay

Commanders
- Notable commanders: Brigadier Mohammad Usman; Brigadier Sagat Singh (Later Lt. Gen); Brigadier Farukh Bulsara

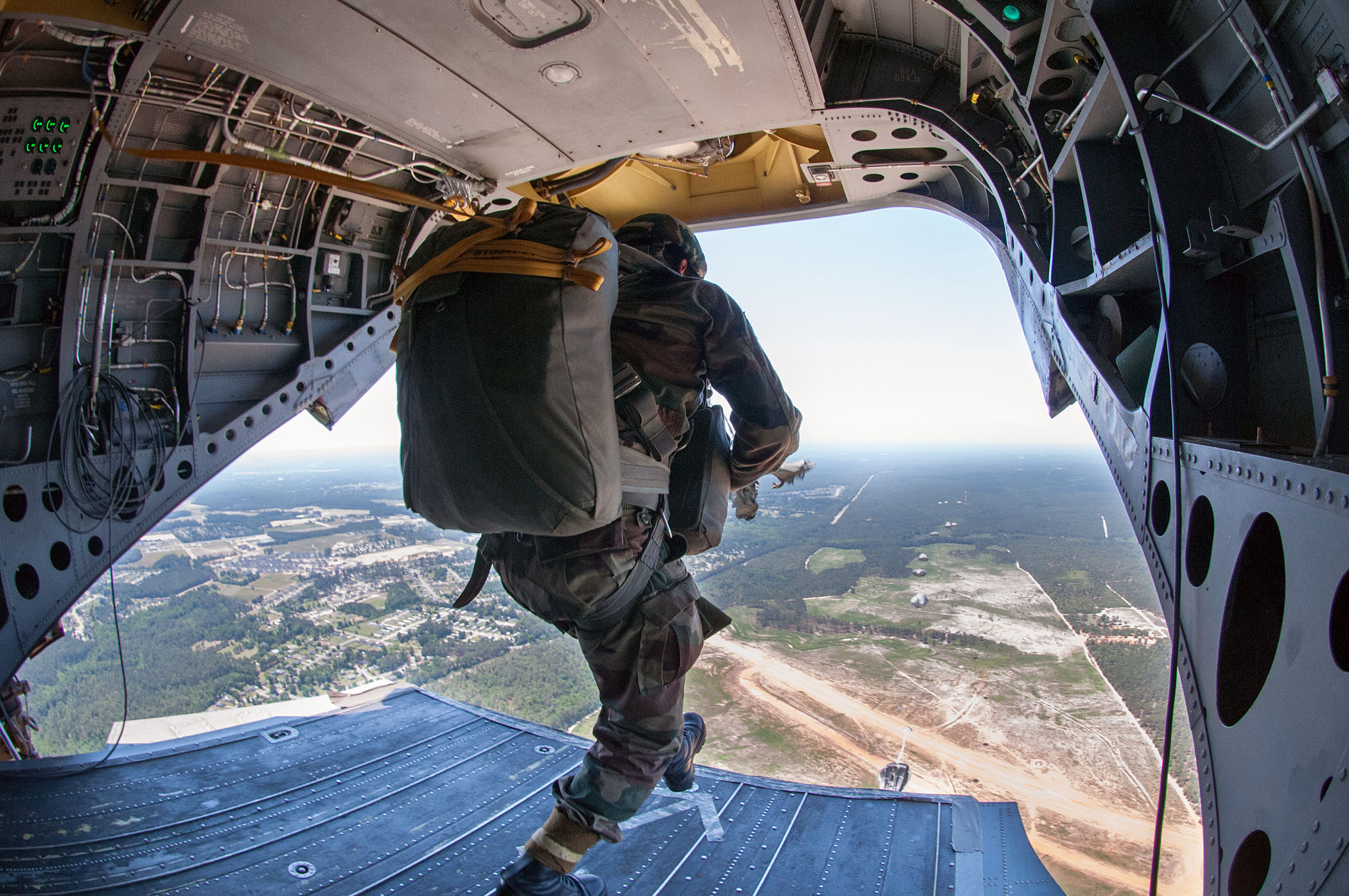
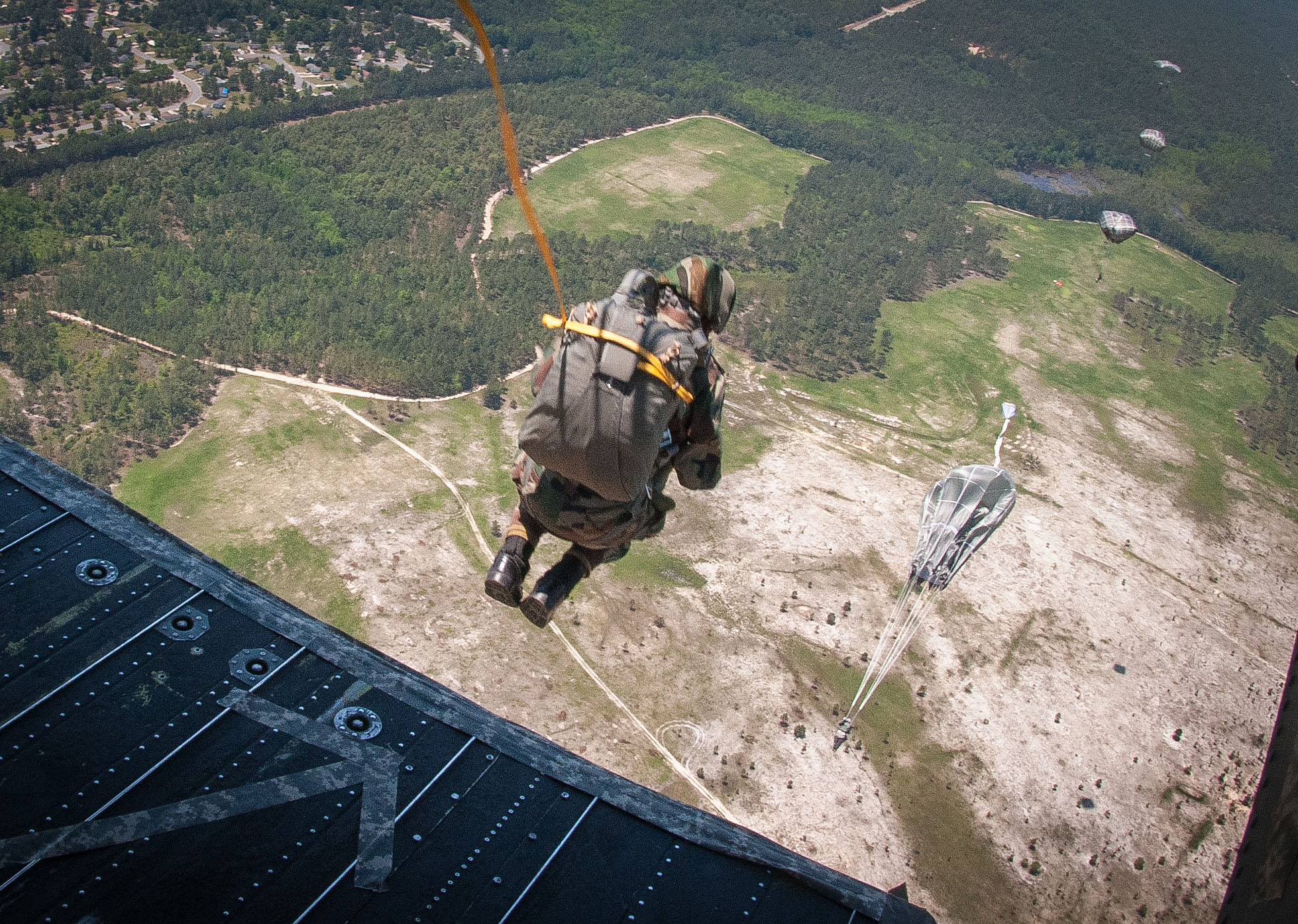
An Indian Army paratrooper with the 50th Parachute Brigade jumps from an aircraft.

The 50th (Independent) Parachute Brigade is an elite airborne forces (special operations capable) brigade sized formation of the Indian Army. Its main force is formed of battalions of the Parachute Regiment. It consists of Parachute Regiment battalions and the President's Bodyguard, supported by units of the Regiment of Artillery, the Corps of Engineers and the Army Medical Corps.

== History ==
The brigade was initially raised as part of the Indian Army during World War II. It was formed in October 1941, during the Second World War, as an independent parachute brigade under command of Brigadier WHG Gough. Later, it was one of two parachute brigades in the 44th Indian Airborne Division. The brigade took part in the Battle of Sangshak, which has been credited with delaying the Japanese forces moving up for the Battle of Imphal which allowed British and Indian reinforcement to reach Kohima.

After formation, the brigade had the following structure:

- Brigade Headquarters
- Brigade Signal Section
- 151st Parachute Battalion - commanded by Lieutenant Colonel MA Lindsay and was made up from volunteers from 23 British infantry battalions serving in India.
- 152nd Parachute Battalion - commanded by Lieutenant Colonel BE Abbott, from volunteers from 19 Indian infantry regiments.
- 153rd Parachute Battalion - commanded by Lieutenant Colonel FJ Loftus-Tottenham with volunteers from 10 Gurkha regiments.
- 411th (Royal Bombay) Parachute Engineer Section, Royal Indian Engineers

== Engagements ==
=== Indo-Pakistani War of 1947-48 ===
The 50th Parachute Brigade saw extensive action in the Kashmir operations of 1947–48. The 1st, 2nd and 3rd battalions of the Parachute Regiment each won a battle honour in the Jammu & Kashmir theater. The brigade commander, Brig. Mohammad Usman, was killed in action on July 3, 1948, and was awarded the Maha Vir Chakra posthumously.

=== Annexation of Goa 1961 ===
The brigade took part in the annexation of Goa along with 17th Indian Infantry Division. Although the 50th Parachute Brigade was charged with merely assisting the main thrust conducted by the 17th Division, its units moved rapidly across minefields, roadblocks and four riverine obstacles to be the first to reach Panjim.

On the morning of 18 December, the 50th Parachute Brigade moved into Goa in three columns.

1. The eastern column, comprising the 2nd battalion, Parachute Regiment, advanced via the town of Ponda in central Goa.
2. The central column, comprising the 1st battalion, Parachute Regiment, advanced via the village of Banastari.
3. The western column - the main thrust of the attack - comprised the 2nd battalion, Sikh Light Infantry as well as an armoured division which crossed the border at 0630 hours in the morning and advanced along Tivim.

The western column, facing no resistance, reached the town of Betim at 1700 hours, just a 500 metre wide river crossing away from Panjim, the capital town. In the absence of orders, the units set camp at Betim and proceeded to secure areas up and down the riverfront.

The order to cross the river was received on the morning of 19 December, upon which two rifle companies advanced on Panjim at 0730 hours and secured the town without facing any resistance. On orders from Brig. Sagat Singh, the troops entering Panjim removed their steel helmets and donned the Parachute Regiment's maroon berets. As the men marched into the town, they were welcomed as liberators by the locals.

=== Indo-Pakistani War of 1965 ===
The 50 Parachute Brigade was tasked with capturing of the Jallo railway bridge. Despite being a newly raised battalion 6 Para of the Parachute Regiment with superb battle drill and fighting spirit attacked the Jallo railway bridge enduring stiff resistance and heavy artillery fire. The unit successfully captured and occupied the bridge on September 17 raising the success signal 'Ghora'.The officers and men in the brigade were overjoyed with this operationally critical capture.

=== Indo-Pakistani War of 1971 ===
In 1971, the brigade saw numerous actions both in the eastern and western theatres. For the first time in the annals of independent India's history, an airborne infantry battle group, formed around the 2nd battalion, Parachute Regiment, was dropped at Tangail, which contributed substantially to speeding up the liberation of Bangladesh. Elements of 2 Para became the first Indian troops to enter Dhaka. The 50th Parachute Brigade saw action initially in Bangladesh with 2 Para in the airborne role, 7 Para as the advance guard, and the rest of the brigade in a ground role. The brigade then moved to assist its sister brigade in the western sector, thus becoming the only formation to see action on both fronts.

=== Operation Cactus ===
In response to an attempted coup d'état in the Maldives, and on the request of Maldivian President Maumoon Abdul Gayoom, the Indian Army launched Operation Cactus. The operation started on the night of 3 November 1988, when Ilyushin Il-76 aircraft of the Indian Air Force airlifted elements of the 50th Independent Parachute Brigade, commanded by Brigadier Farukh Bulsara, from Agra Air Force Station and flew them non-stop over 2,000 kilometres (1,240 mi) to land them over the Malé International Airport on Hulhulé Island. The 6th battalion The Parachute Regiment (6 Para), commanded by Col Subash Joshi, and the 17th Parachute Field Regiment made up the first wave, followed by the 7th battalion, Parachute Regiment as the second wave. The paratroopers arrived in Hulhule nine hours after the appeal from President Gayoom. They immediately secured the airfield, crossed over to Male using commandeered boats and rescued President Gayoom. The paratroopers restored control of the capital to President Gayoom's government within hours.

=== Kargil War ===
The 50th Parachute Brigade, at the time consisting of the 6th, 7th and 1st battalions of the Parachute Regiment and an ATGM detachment of the 19th battalion, Brigade of the Guards, was deployed in the Mushkoh Valley as the Army HQ reserve. Elements of the brigade were awarded with the COAS Unit Citation for their performance in clearing the Mushkoh valley intrusions.

== Structure ==
Elements of the 50th Parachute Brigade training with the US Army XVIII Airborne Corps during Exercise Yudh Abhyas 2013

The 50th Parachute Brigade comprises the following units:

- Three battalions of the Parachute Regiment in rotation.
- One Parachute Field Regiment (Artillery) (9 Parachute Field Regiment and 17 Parachute Field Regiments in rotation)
- 60 Parachute Field Hospital (AMC)
- 411 (Independent) Parachute Field Company (Bombay Sappers)
- 622 Parachute Composite Company (ASC)
- 50th (Independent) Parachute Brigade OFP (Ordnance)
- 50th (Independent) Parachute Brigade Signal Company (Signals)
- 2 (Independent) Parachute Field Workshop Company (EME)
- 252 (Parachute) Air Defence Battery (AAD)
- 50th (Independent) Parachute Brigade Provost Section (CMP)

The President's Bodyguard also forms part of the brigade as the pathfinder company.

The Airborne Special Forces Battalions of the Parachute Regiment rotate to form part of the brigade, alternatively serving their field tenures in counter-insurgency/high-altitude areas.

In December 1990, a company-strength element of the 12th Battalion, Mechanised Infantry was selected and underwent specialized training for an airborne role. Designated as the Para Mech Company, the sub-unit was operationally deployed under the command of the 50th Parachute Brigade. During the major military exercise, Exercise Vijay Path, the Para Mech Company validated its strategic integration with airborne forces. The unit successfully executed 32 heavy drops of BMP Infantry Combat Vehicles (ICVs) alongside fully equipped combat personnel. Currently, the brigade holds twelve BMP-2 Infantry Combat Vehicles that are crewed by personnel from the parachute regiment battalions.

== See also ==
- List of Indian Army Brigades in World War II
- Brig Mohammad Usman, MVC (posthumous)
- Pathfinders
- List of Airborne Artillery Units
- List of paratrooper forces
- Paratrooper
