= Operation Bluebird =

1987 Indian anti-separatist military operation

The post of the Assam Rifles near Oinam village, Manipur, India was attacked and looted by the National Socialist Council of Nagaland (NSCN) on 9 July 1987. This act resulted in the killing of nine Indian soldiers at the post and the looting of a large amount of machinery and ammunition. In response to this act, and to recapture the looted firearms, Operation Bluebird was launched by the Indian Army. The search operation continued for more than three months until October 1987 in more than 30 villages but no arms and ammunitions were recovered.

However, the villagers were brutally tortured, human-rights were violated on a large scale during this period and even pregnant women were forced to give birth to their babies in the presence of the Indian soldiers. Innocent villagers were tortured by the high-ranked military officials and even some of them were buried alive after third degree torture. More than 300 people claimed to be tortured, 3 women claimed to be raped and 5 claimed of being molested. The villagers were also forced to prepare food for the soldiers for more than 2 months until the villagers ended their granary stocks.

After months of suffering the villagers requested the regional government for help, to which the Chief Minister of Manipur wrote to the Home Minister and even met Prime Minister Rajiv Gandhi regarding the torture and killing of the villagers by the soldiers of Assam Rifles. But this step enraged the military officers and they even tried to trap the Chief Minister, and other MP and MLA's in false cases of being involved in Anti-Nationalist Activities.

Later, petition against the army officials was filed by the villagers in the Gauhati High Court. For more than 28 years, no action was taken on this case and later, due to the absence of any other records except the pleadings of the villagers it was discarded.

== Legacy ==
Every year, villagers commemorate the day as Onae Reh Dah on 9 July.
