= Dakha (Ludhiana West) =

- Village
- Location in Punjab, India Dakha (India)
- Coordinates: 30.8567249°N 75.6826606°E
- Country: India
- State: Punjab
- District: Ludhiana
- Tehsil: Ludhiana West

Government
  - Type: Panchayati raj (India)
  - Body: Gram panchayat

Population (2011)
  - Total: 6,321

Languages
  - Official: Punjabi
  - Other spoken: Hindi
- Time zone: UTC+5:30 (IST)
- PIN: 141101
- Telephone code: 0161
- ISO 3166 code: IN-PB
- Vehicle registration: PB-10
- Website: ludhiana.nic.in

Dakha is a village located in the Ludhiana West tehsil, of Ludhiana District, Punjab.

== Administration ==
The village is administered by a Sarpanch who is an elected representative of the village as per the constitution of India and Panchayati raj.

Particulars	Total	Male	Female
Total No. of Houses	1,270		
Population	6,321	3,294	3,027
Child (0-6)	637	340	297
Schedule Caste	1,959	1,034	925
Schedule Tribe	0	0	0
Literacy	80.79 %	83.99 %	77.33 %
Total Workers	2,199	1,844	355
Main Worker	2,119	0	0
Marginal Worker	80	46	34

== Air travel connectivity ==
The closest airport to the village is Sahnewal Airport.
