= Mission Dove =

Glider-borne assault

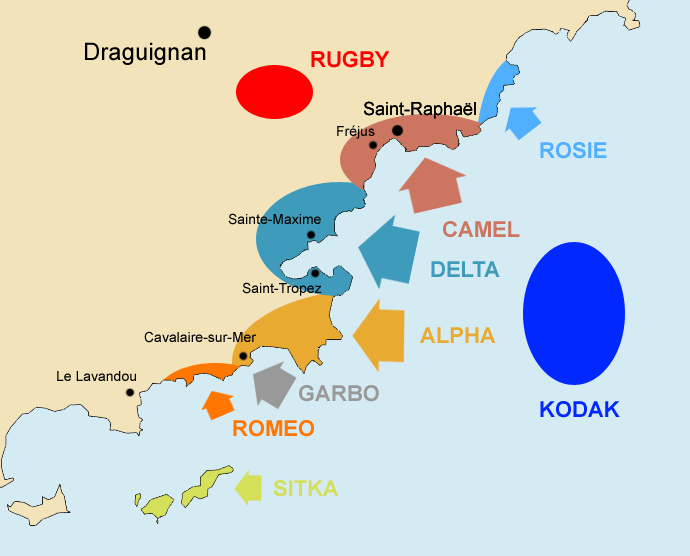
Diagram of Operation Dragoon: Mission Dove personnel were dropped in the area marked "Rugby."

In World War II, Mission Dove (Allies, 1944) was the glider-borne assault conducted as part of the invasion of southern France (Operation Dragoon) on 15 August 1944. The original parachute landing, Mission Albatross comprising 396 aircraft carrying 5,600 paratroopers and 150 field guns arrived over the drop zone at 0430hrs. Fog and low cloud resulting in 600 paratroops landing 10 miles away, others were closer, but some ended up 15 miles away.

Three hundred and thirty five Waco CG-4 gliders carried the 55th Glider Infantry Battalion together with equipment to reinforce paratroopers who had already landed, came in at 1810hrs.

Dove was one of three reinforcement operations, the other two being:

- Mission Bluebird - 35 Horsa and 40 Waco CG-4 gliders mainly carrying artillery. The Horsa's turned back because of thick fog, 33 CG-4 managed to land.

Most of the gliders returned that afternoon and managed to land.

- Mission Canary - A parachute reinforcement from 41 transports, landing from 1804hrs.
