= Sher =

Sher may refer to:

== People ==
=== Title ===
- Sher-e-Mysore (Lion of Mysore), a popular title of Tipu Sultan of the Mysore Sultanate
- Sher-e-Punjab (disambiguation)
  - Sher-e-Punjab (Lion of Punjab), a popular title of Ranjit Singh of the Sikh Empire
- Sher-e-Punjab (Lion of Punjab), Lala Lajpat Rai, an Indian independence activist
- Sher-e-Bangla (Tiger of Bengal), a popular title of the 20th century Bengali statesman A. K. Fazlul Huq
- Sher-e-Delhi (Lion of Delhi), a popular title of 20th-century Indian statesman Chaudhary Brahm Prakash
- Sher-e-Hindustan (disambiguation)

=== Surname ===
- Avner Sher (born 1951), Israeli architect and artist
- Antony Sher (1949–2021), British actor
- Barbara Sher (1935–2020), career/lifestyle coach, and author
- Bartlett Sher (born 1959), American theatre director
- Byron Sher (1928–2026), American Democratic politician
- Eden Sher (born 1991), American television actor
- George Sher, American professor
- Gila Sher, Israeli professor
- Gilead Sher (born 1953), Israeli attorney
- Izzy Sher (1912–1999), Jewish-American sculptor
- Jack Sher (1913–1988), American director and writer
- Julian Sher, Canadian journalist
- Lawrence Sher (born 1970), American cinematographer
- Neal Sher, American lawyer
- Richard Sher (disambiguation)
- Stacey Sher (born 1962), American film producer
- Tamara Sher (born 1962), American psychologist
- Zaheer Sher (born 1975), English cricketer, also known by his nickname, Bobby

=== Given name ===
- Ali Sher (disambiguation)
- Sher Afzal Marwat, (born 1971) Pakistani Pashtun lawyer
- Sher Ahmad Khan (died 1861), Pashtun chief
- Sher Ahmed Khan (1902–1972), Kashmiri guerrilla commander
- Sher Ali (disambiguation)
- Sher Alam Ibrahimi (born 1955), Afghan governor and military commander
- Sher Bahadur Deuba (born 1946), Nepalese politician and former Prime Minister
- Sher Bahadur Kunwor, Nepalese politician
- Sher Bahadur Singh (died 2020), Indian politician
- Sher Bahadur Thapa (1921–1944), Nepalese army officer in the British Indian Army
- Sher Jung Thapa (1907–1999), Gurkha military officer
- Sher Lama (born 1973), Hong Kong cricketer
- Sher Malang, Afghan governor of Nimruz Province, Afghanistan under the Taliban government
- Sher Mian Dad (born 1968), Pakistani folk singer
- Sher Mohammed (disambiguation)
- Sher Muhammad, a Khan of Moghlistan from 1421 to 1425
- Sher Shah Suri (1486–1545), king of the Sur Empire in India
- Sher Singh (1807–1843), Sikh ruler of the sovereign country of Punjab and the Sikh Empire
- Sher Singh Attariwalla (died 1858), 19th century Sikh military commander
- Sher Singh Ghubaya (born 1962), Indian politician
- Sher Singh Rana, Indian criminal
- Sher Valenzuela, American political candidate
- Sher Ali Bacha (1935–1998), Pashtun revolutionary leader
- Sher Zaman Taizi (1931–2009), Pashtun journalist

== Other uses ==
- Sher (film), a 2015 Indian film
- Sher (poem), the common word for couplet in Persian and Urdu
- Sher A 2025 Pakistani television series starring Danish Taimoor and Sarah Khan
- Sher (dance), a form of dance in Eastern European folk music, notably Russian and Klezmer music

== See also ==
- Shera (disambiguation)
- Sherni (disambiguation)
- Sher Khan (disambiguation)
- Sher Shah (disambiguation)
- Falak Sher (disambiguation)
- Sherabad (disambiguation)
- Shear (disambiguation)
- Sheer (disambiguation)
- Cher (disambiguation)
- Shir (disambiguation)
- Shere, village in England
