= Sher Shah =

Sher Shah may refer to:

== People ==
- Sher Shah Suri (1486–1545), founder of the Suri dynasty
- Sher Shah (VC) (1917–1945), British Indian Army soldier and Victoria Cross recipient
- Shershah Syed, Pakistani physician
- Vikram Batra (1974–1999), Indian army officer, nicknamed Shershah

== Places ==
=== India ===
- Sher Shah Suri Mosque, mosque in Patna, Bihar, India
- Tomb of Sher Shah Suri, tomb of Sher Shah Suri in Sasaram, Bihar, India
- Sher Shah Suri Marg, another name for some of the Indian parts of the Grand Trunk Road
- Shershahabad, another name for Purana Qila in Delhi, India

=== Pakistan ===
- Sher Shah (Karachi), neighbourhood of Kiamari Town, Karachi, Pakistan
  - Sher Shah Bridge, a flyover in the neighborhood
- Sher Shah, Multan, town in Multan District, Pakistan

== Others ==
- Shershah College of Engineering, Sasaram, Bihar, India
- Shershaah, 2021 Indian war film by Vishnuvardhan, about Vikram Batra
- Shershahabadia, an Indian Muslim community
- Tarikh-i-Sher Shahi, a chronicle of the rule of Sher Shah Suri
- Shershah Suri, Indian television show about Sher Shah Suri, broadcast by Doordarshan

== See also ==
- Sher Khan (disambiguation)
