= Ajay Singh Jasrotia =

Indian army officer (1972–1999)

Major Ajay Singh Jasrotia SM
- Born: 31 March 1972; Gandhi Nagar, Jammu, Jammu and Kashmir, India
- Died: 15 June 1999 (aged 27); Dras, Jammu and Kashmir, India
- Military career
- Allegiance: India
- Branch: Indian Army
- Service years: 1996–1999
- Rank: Major
- Nicknames: Jassi; Rambo
- Service number: SS-36635
- Unit: 13 JAK RIF
- Conflicts: Kargil War †
- Awards: Sena Medal

Major Ajay Singh Jasrotia, SM (31 March 1972 – 15 June 1999) was an Indian military officer with the 13 Jammu and Kashmir Rifles (13 JAK RIF) who laid down his life during Kargil War to save the lives of his six comrades.

He was deployed in Sopore in the Baramulla district of Jammu and Kashmir when the Kargil War broke out. In spite of his weight-bearing restrictions after ankle surgery, he volunteered to join his unit 13 JAK RIF under the command of Lt General then Colonel Yogesh Kumar Joshi which was moved to the Dras sector as a reserve force.

On 15 June 1999, the base camp came under heavy artillery shelling and six of his soldiers were injured. Amidst heavy artillery shelling which continued unabated, he evacuated the wounded to safety by carrying them on his back. While rescuing the last soldier he was fatally wounded by shrapnel. All of the six lived to tell the tale. He was posthumously awarded the Sena Medal for his courage and sacrifice.

Contrary to British Indian Army times when officers commanded from behind, today Indian Army officers lead their troops from front and Jasrotia was among the few senior most officers to be martyred while evacuating the wounded soldiers during Kargil War. Knowing that he won't survive he refused to be evacuated before his wounded men, giving a new definition of valour, devotion to duty and supreme sacrifice.

His death played a role in motivating his juniors Captain then Lieutenant Vikram Batra PVC and Colonel then Lieutenant Sanjeev Singh Jamwal VrC to capture Point 5140 without any casualty. Coincidentally Batra was killed in a similar way as Jasrotia during the capture of Point 4875 when he exposed himself to enemy fire while rescuing an injured soldier.

== Early life ==
He was born into a family of military traditions, his grandfather Khajoor Singh Jasrotia was a Lieutenant Colonel in J&K State Forces and later ADC to Karan Singh, his father Arjun Singh Jasrotia was the DIG of Border Security Force. He was fondly known as “Rambo” during his schooling days in Jammu. He did his primary education from BSF School Paloura in Jammu, senior secondary from Kendriya Vidyalaya Jalandhar Cantt, B.Com. from SPMR Commerce College in Jammu, SSB from Allahabad and military training from OTA Chennai.

== Legacy ==
- A road in Gandhi Nagar area of Jammu has been named as Kargil Shaheed Major Ajay Jasrotia Marg to honour his sacrifice.
- Major Ajay Singh Jasrotia Park is a park in a Sainik Colony in Jammu with his bust in the center.
- His graduation college dedicated college library to him.
- Shaheed Ajay Jasrotia Gas Agency is a gas agency at Sainik School Road Nagrota, Jammu named after him.
- His character was portrayed in the movie LOC: Kargil (2003) by actor Amit Behl and by Nikitin Dheer in Shershaah (2021).
