= Sher Shah Kabari Market =

Open-air bazaar in Karachi, Pakistan

- شیر شاہ کباڑی بازار
- Location: Sher Shah, Karachi, Sindh, Pakistan
- Coordinates: 24.885°N 66.987°E
- Opened: Early 1960s
- Num. of stores: More than 4,000

Sher Shah Kabari Market (Urdu: شیر شاہ کباڑی بازار) is a large aggregation of scrapyards and used‑parts dealers situated along the northern bank of the Lyari River in the Sher Shah neighbourhood of Karachi, Sindh, Pakistan. It is one of the largest clearing house for second‑hand machinery, vehicle engines and industrial salvage in Pakistan.

== History ==
The market originated after the Karachi Metropolitan Corporation earmarked a former landfill beside Sher Shah Bridge for regulated scrap trading in the early 1960s. Merchants recall that the first purpose‑built row of shops appeared in 1960, attracting junk collectors who had previously worked out of Rattan Talao, Akbar Road and Lea Market. Over subsequent decades the bazaar spread into adjoining plots within the Sindh Industrial and Trading Estate, drawing supplies from Karachi Port and, by road, the Gadani Ship Breaking Yard, whose dismantled vessels provided a steady flow of ferrous scrap and marine equipment.

By the late 1980s, Sher Shah had become integral to Karachi's informal repair economy, supplying refurbished Japanese‑made engines as well as motors, switchgear and bearings for small industrial units across Pakistan. Journalistic surveys in the 1990s and 2000s described it as a "mother market" that spawned satellite auto‑parts hubs at Shafiq Morr and Magazine Line; traders attribute the growth to Karachi's rising population and the chronic shortage of affordable new spares.

=== 2010 extortion attack ===
On 19 October 2010, twelve shopkeepers in lane‑413 were shot dead after refusing to pay protection money to gang members from the neighbouring Lyari district. The killings, followed by a partial shutdown and heavy police deployment, marked the market's worst single episode of violence and underscored its exposure to criminal rackets then prevalent in west Karachi. A security crackdown after 2013 largely restored daytime order, though dealers contend the incident accelerated the migration of businesses to emerging parts markets elsewhere in the city.
