= 2026 Multan train derailment =

Train derailment in Multan, Pakistan

Details
- Date: 13 October 2026 c. 5:15 a.m. PKT
- Location: Multan, Punjab
- Country: Pakistan
- Line: Karachi–Peshawar Line
- Operator: Pakistan Railways
- Incident type: Derailment
- Cause: Fault in passenger coach: under investigation

Statistics
- Trains: A passenger train (Train No. 8223)
- Passengers: 500+
- Deaths: 7
- Injured: 50+

On 13 October 2026, the Rehman Baba Express passenger train derailed in Multan, Punjab, Pakistan, killing seven people and injuring over 50 others.

== Background ==
The Rehman Baba Express is a passenger train operated daily by Pakistan Railways between Karachi and Peshawar. The train was inaugurated on 23 December 2018 by former Minister for Railways Sheikh Rasheed Ahmad at Peshawar Cantonment railway station. The train similarly derailed near Hyderabad on 13 May 2022 while bound for Karachi from Peshawar. All of the bogies derailed along with the engine, however, no casualties were reported.

== Accident ==
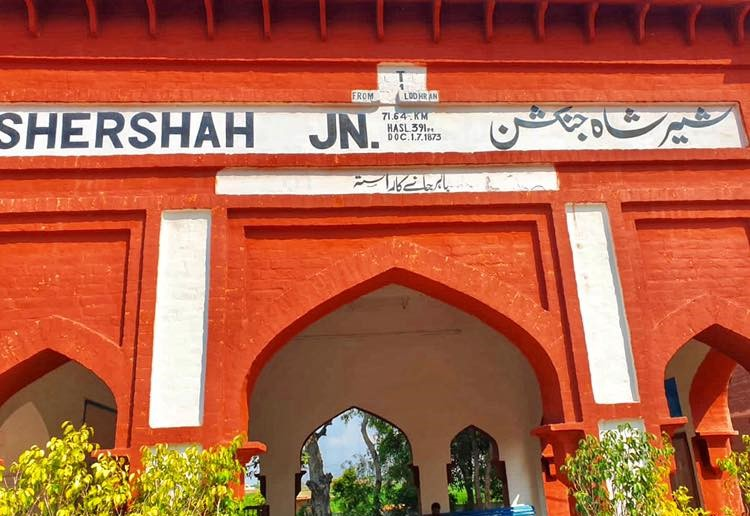
The Sher Shah Junction railway station in 2023

The derailment happened at around 5:15 a.m. while the train was passing through the Sher Shah Junction railway station in Multan. The train driver said while travelling at 100 kilometres per hour (62 mph), he suddenly felt a push and applied the brakes. After stopping, some 14 coaches derailed near the Sher Shah Bridge. Search and rescue teams immediately launched an evacuation operation.

== Aftermath ==
Railway traffic on the affected section were suspended, while an additional train was dispatched to transport the stranded passengers to Peshawar.

== Victims ==
Seven people were killed, including a one-year-old, and more than 50 others were injured. The injured victims were transported to the nearby Nishtar Hospital for treatment, including some in critical condition. 21 people were still receiving treatment a day after the accident.

== Investigation ==
According to an initial investigation report, the derailment was likely caused by a fault in a passenger coach. The train driver said the train was in working order, while a passenger said that workers had repaired the nuts and bolts of coach number nine near Rohri. Minister for Railways Hanif Abbasi appointed the federal government inspector of railways (FGIR) as the inquiry officer.

== See also ==
- 2023 Hazara Express derailment
