= Battle of point 5140 =

1999 battle during India/Pakistan war

Capture of Point 5140
- Part of Kargil War
Date	20 June 1999
Location	Dras, Kargil
Result	Indian victory
Territorial changes	Point 5140 recaptured by India

Belligerents
India	Pakistan

Commanders and leaders
Yogesh Kumar Joshi; Vikram Batra; Sanjeev Jamwal	Unknown

Units involved
13th Jammu and Kashmir Rifles	Northern Light Infantry Regiment

The Battle of point 5140 was fought on 20 June 1999 and was major military offensive carried out by the Jammu and Kashmir Rifles regiment as a part of the Operation Vijay (Kargil War). The Indian forces under Lieutenant Colonel Yogesh Kumar Joshi were able to capture the point.

== Overview ==
After the capture of Tololing on 14 June, the task of capturing the supply source of Tololing, Point 5140 was assigned to 13 JAK Rif of the 56 Mountain brigade. Its commanding officer had to be evacuated out of Kargil for medical reasons and Major YK Joshi was promoted to Lt Col to carry out the assault on 17 June. After the capture of Rocky Knob, located at the base of Point 5140 and about 800 metres away, Humps IX and X (part of Hump Complex, consisting of about ten high grounds numbered I to X on the same ridgeline about 500–700 metres north of Point 4590) on 17 June, the battalion's commanding officer, Joshi, fell back to Tololing, and started planning for their next objective — Point 5140. Point 5140, about 1500 metres north of Tololing on the same ridgeline, is at an altitude of 16,962 feet above sea level and overlooks the Tololing nullah. It is the highest point on the Tololing ridgeline and the most formidable feature in the Dras sub-sector.

On 18 June, the battalion carried out a detailed reconnaissance of Point 5140 which revealed the enemy had put in place seven sangars on the feature; two on the top, four towards the east and one towards the north. It also revealed the eastern approach to the feature was comparatively easier than that from the front, which had a near vertical climb, dominated by the top, though it was also more heavily defended. It was decided the assaulting troops must capture the Top before dawn, or else the enemy would inflict maximum casualties on them.

Joshi decided to attack Point 5140 with Bravo Company, under the command of Lieutenant Sanjeev Singh Jamwal, and Delta Company, under the command of Lieutenant Vikram Batra, from two sides; East and South. At the Hump Complex, Sanjeev Jamwal and Vikram received their briefing about the mission from Joshi. During the briefing, Jamwal chose the words "Oh! Yeah, yeah, yeah!" to be the success signal for his company whilst Vikram chose the words "Yeh Dil Mange More!" (This heart wants more! — from a popular advertising slogan of Pepsi) as his success signal for his company. D-Day was set for 19 June, and H-Hour at 20:30.

Under the cover of artillery fire, the two assault companies began climbing Point 5140 after midnight on 20 June. The artillery at Hump Complex had already begun its preparatory bombardment of Point 5140. As planned, the artillery guns would stop firing when the troops were 200 metres short of the objective.

Once the artillery guns, including the MBRLs and 105 mm guns, had ceased firing, the Pakistani soldiers immediately came out of their bunkers and put down heavy fire with their machine guns on the advancing Indian soldiers. At that moment, both Jamwal and Batra, contacted commanders at the base via radio, asking to continue artillery bombardment of the enemy positions till the companies were 100 metres from their target.

By 0315 hours, both B and D Companies had reached the vicinity of Point 5140 despite the treacherous terrain. B company reached the top of the feature first and assaulted from the left flank. By 0330 hours, B company had captured its objective, and at 0335 hours Jamwal radioed his command post, saying the words "Oh! Yeah, yeah, yeah!"

Batra decided to approach the hill from the rear, aiming to surprise the enemy, and to cut off their withdrawal route. Batra fired three rockets towards the bunkers on the east side of the feature, before attacking them. He and his men ascended the sheer rock-cliff, but as the group neared the top, the enemy pinned them on the face of the bare cliff with machine gun fire. Batra, along with five of his men, climbed up and after reaching the top, hurled two grenades at the machine gun post. Batra then killed three enemy soldiers single-handedly in close combat. He was seriously injured in the process, but insisted on regrouping his men to continue with the mission. He continued to lead his troops, and then charged at the next enemy position, capturing Point 5140. In all its actions, his company killed at least eight Pakistani intruders and recovered a heavy anti-aircraft machine gun. The remaining enemy soldiers fled.

At 0435 hours, Batra radioed his command post, saying the words "Yeh dil mange more!". Considerable quantities of arms and ammunition were recovered from the feature. The captured munitions indicated the enemy's strength was about a platoon. Neither B or D companies suffered any casualties in the battle. The capture of Point 5140 set in motion a string of successes, such as the captures of Point 5100, Point 4700, Junction Peak and the Three Pimple Complex.

== Aftermath ==
After the capture of Point 5140, Batra was promoted to the rank of captain. General Ved Prakash Malik, the then Chief of Army Staff, called to congratulate him. All across the nation, his triumph was being played out on television screens.

On 26 June, shortly after the capture of Point 5140, 13 JAK Rif was ordered to move from Dras to Ghumri to rest, refit, and regroup. The battalion then moved to Mushkoh Valley on 30 June.
