= Shera =

Shera may refer to:

== People ==
- Shera (Indian bodyguard), Indian celebrity bodyguard
- Jack Shera, Canadian politician of the Northwest Territories
- John Shera (1840–1906), New Zealand politician
- Mahabali Shera, Indian professional wrestler
- Mark Shera, American actor

== Other uses ==
- She-Ra, a fictional character and the heroine in the Filmation cartoon and series of toys produced by Mattel called She-Ra: Princess of Power as well as the Netflix series She-Ra and the Princesses of Power
- Shera (mascot), the mascot for the 2010 Commonwealth Games
- Shera (film), a 1999 Indian film
- Shera, Hansot, a place in Gujarat, India
- Shamsher Singh "Shera", fictional gangster in the 1984 Indian film Andar Baahar, played by Danny Denzongpa
- Shera, fictional villain in the 1975 Indian film Kaala Sona, played by Denzongpa

== See also ==
- Sher (disambiguation)
- Reshma Aur Shera, a 1971 Indian film
