= Shershaah =

2021 Indian film by Vishnuvardhan

- Official release poster
- Directed by: Vishnuvardhan
- Written by: Sandeep Shrivastava
- Produced by: Hiroo Yash Johar; Karan Johar; Apoorva Mehta; Shabbir Boxwala; Ajay Shah; Himanshu Gandhi
- Starring: Sidharth Malhotra; Kiara Advani
- Cinematography: Kamaljeet Negi
- Edited by: A. Sreekar Prasad
- Music by: Score: John Stewart Eduri; Songs: Tanishk Bagchi; B Praak; Jasleen Royal; Javed–Mohsin; Vikram Montrose
- Production companies: Dharma Productions; Kaash Entertainment
- Distributed by: Amazon Prime Video
- Release date: 12 August 2021
- Running time: 135 minutes
- Country: India
- Language: Hindi

Shershaah (transl. Lion-king) is a 2021 Indian Hindi-language biographical war drama film based on the life of Vikram Batra, martyred in action in the Kargil War, directed by Vishnuvardhan in his Hindi film debut and written by Sandeep Shrivastava. The film was produced by Dharma Productions and Kaash Entertainment, with Hiroo Yash Johar, Karan Johar, Apoorva Mehta, Shabbir Boxwala, Ajay Shah and Himanshu Gandhi serving as producers. Sidharth Malhotra stars in a dual role as Vikram Batra and Vishal Batra, with Kiara Advani as his girlfriend Dimple Cheema.

Announced in May 2019, principal photography began in the same month and concluded in January 2020. Initially slated to be released on 3 July 2020, the film was postponed due to the COVID-19 pandemic. The film then premiered on 12 August 2021 on Amazon Prime Video.

Shershaah received positive reviews from critics and audiences. The performances (especially Malhotra's and Advani's), direction, music, cinematography, action sequences, editing, and visual effects received high critical acclaim. However, the writing received some criticism. On 31 August 2021, Amazon stated that Shershaah had become the most watched Indian film on the platform in India.

Shershaah led the 67th Filmfare Awards with 19 nominations, including Best Actor (Malhotra) and Best Actress (Advani), and won 7 awards including Best Film, Best Director (Vishnuvardhan), Best Music Director (Tanishk Bagchi, B Praak, Jasleen Royal, Javed-Mohsin and Vikram Montrose), Best Male Playback Singer (Praak for "Mann Bharrya") and Best Female Playback Singer (Asees Kaur for "Raatan Lambiyaan"). At the 69th National Film Awards, the film won the Special Jury Award (Feature Film) (Vishnuvardhan and Johar).

== Plot ==
Vishal Batra delivers a Ted Talk on his brother Vikram narrating the story of his life.

The young Vikram is playing cricket when he gets into a fight with elder teenage kids over a ball, revealing the fearless nature he later became known for. Vikram, watching the TV series Param Vir Chakra used to talk about his wish to join the Indian Army. His desire to join the army increases intensely as he grows up.

In his college days, Vikram, studying English as his major subject, wanted to join the Indian Navy or the Indian Army. He was selected for the Merchant Navy which made his girlfriend Dimple happy yet confused about his career. Vikram and Dimple wanted to get married, however, Dimple's father refuses to accept Vikram because they belong to different castes. Meanwhile, Vikram realised that he was not meant for the Merchant Navy but for the Army. He cracks CDS (Combined Defence Services) after completing his master's degree and joins the Indian Army. Vikram was commissioned as a lieutenant of Jammu and Kashmir Rifles and posted in Sopore of Jammu and Kashmir. He develops cordial relations with both his men and locals and takes part in counter-insurgency operations. On one such operation, he defies his CO Lt. Sanjeev "Jimmy" Jamwal but neutralises the perpetrators and saves Jimmy's life. Jimmy reprimands his approach but gets close to him later.

The Delta Company, of which Vikram is also a part as lieutenant, catches an insurgent group's henchman. In retaliation, the leader Haider ambushes Delta Company by luring them with intel of a weapons cache. Vikram's friend Naib Subedar Bansi Lal is among those killed. Traumatised and vengeful, he tracks down Haider and obtains authorisation from the unit's CO, Lt. Col. Y. K. Joshi for an operation. Delta Company led by Vikram raids Haider's house, killing him. Subsequently, he prepares to go on leave as unbeknownst to him the Kargil War nears.

In May 1999 at Rawalpindi, Pakistan, the Pakistani Army chief began an offensive move to capture Kashmir and sends troops to capture Kargil. As news about a potential war gains traction, Vikram decides to cut short his vacation and return. He makes promise to his friend Sunny "I'll either come back after raising the Indian flag in victory or return wrapped in it. But I'll come for sure."

The unit is moved to the Ghumri Army Base, as a reserve force, along with other regiments to acclimatise and prepare. The base comes under artillery fire that results in multiple casualties, including Vikram's senior, Major Ajay Singh Jasrotia. Three weeks into the war, 13 JAK RIF is moved to active-duty to relieve 2nd Rajputana Rifles (2 RAJ RIF) and tasked with recapturing Point 5140 at 17,000 feet. Vikram adopts the codename Shershaah and victory signal Yeh Dil Maange More, for radio communication. Jimmy and Vikram lead their companies and recapture Point 5140 without casualties, garnering praise in the army and public. During the war, Vikram gets promoted to the rank of captain.

Following their impressive victory, the Army Command tasks 13 JAK Rif with capturing Point 4875 which overlooks National Highway 1 and would figuratively end the war. They begin the assault on Point 4875 the next day, but take heavy casualties due to rough terrain and multiple enemy bunkers. Eventually, they destroy the four bunkers they are aware of. Unaware of a fifth camouflaged bunker, they take heavy fire. Vikram tasks Rifleman Yash Paul to use a Pakistani RPG-7 at the bunker. A sniper however hits him before he can fire. Vikram runs across open ground to rescue him and does so successfully but is hit multiple times by both sniper and AK-47 rounds. As he collapses, he watches Subedar Raghunath Singh take command and charge at the final bunker. He dies from his injuries, watching the Indian Army raise the national flag. He is posthumously awarded the Param Vir Chakra for his actions on Point 4875.

The ending shows his funeral in Palampur Kangra and a distraught Dimple. The real Vikram is also shown in the credits.

== Cast ==
- Sidharth Malhotra in a double role as
  - Captain Vikram “Vicky” Batra, PVC (Shershaah)
    - Krishnay Tuteja as Young Vikram, Vishal's elder twin brother
  - Vishal Batra
    - Kavay Tuteja as Young Vishal, Vikram's younger twin brother
- Kiara Advani as Dimple Cheema, Vicky's girlfriend and fiancée
- Shiv Panditt as Lieutenant Sanjeev "Jimmy" Jamwal (Sangram), Vicky's colleague and later friend
- Nikitin Dheer as Major Ajay "Jassi" Singh Jasrotia, Vicky's colleague
- Anil Charanjeett as Naib Subedar Bansi Lal Sharma, Vicky's close friend
- Shataf Figar as Lt.Col. Yogesh Kumar "Y. K." Joshi (Chanakya), CO of 13 JAK RIF
- Abhiroy Singh as Major Subrata "Subbu" Mukherjee, Vicky's colleague and the CO of Delta Company
- Sahil Vaid as Amit "Sunny" Sood, Vicky's best friend
- Manmeet Kaur as Mona Singh, Dimple's best friend
- Raj Arjun as Subedar Raghunath Singh (Raghu Saab), a platoon commander in Delta Company
- Pranay Singh Pachauri as Rifleman Yash Paul Sharma
- Atul Verma as Rifleman Meher Singh
- Pawan Chopra as Girdhari Lal "G. L." Batra, Vicky and Vishal's father
- Mir Sarwar as Haider, a Pakistani terrorist
- Ujjwal Gauraha as Pakistani Soldier
- Bijay J. Anand as Mr. Cheema, Dimple's father
- Himmanshoo A. Malhotra as Captain Rajeev Kapoor (Maharana Pratap), Adjutant of 13 JAK RIF
- Rakesh Dubey as Major Vijay Bhaskar
- Ankur Sharma as Major Vikas Vohra
- Jay Kartik as Lieutenant Naveen Nagappa
- Vijay Meenu as Kamal Kanta Batra, Vicky & Vishal's mother

== Production ==
Karan Johar confirmed in 2018 that he would be producing a biopic on the life of Captain Vikram Batra. The Batra family wanted Sidharth Malhotra to play Batra. He was eventually selected to portray the double role of Batra and his identical twin brother Vishal. Several actresses were in discussions to play Batra's fiancée, Dimple Cheema before Kiara Advani was cast. Malhotra started military training for the film in April 2019. Before the official announcement of the film, it was speculated that the title will be "Mera Dil Maange More" but later was changed to "Shershaah".

The film was officially announced on 2 May 2019, with the title confirmed and shooting locations to be Chandigarh, Palampur, Kangra, Kargil, Ladakh and Kashmir Valley. Principal photography commenced on 7 May 2019 and the film wrapped on 12 January 2020. Patchwork shots were completed by 23 October 2020.

== Soundtrack ==
The songs featured in the film were composed by Tanishk Bagchi, B Praak, Jasleen Royal, Javed-Mohsin and Vikram Montrose with lyrics written by Manoj Muntashir, Rashmi Virag, Anvita Dutt, Jaani and Bagchi. John Stewart Eduri composed the film score. The music album which was released by Sony Music India on 16 August 2021, was considered as the biggest soundtracks of 2021 and had crossed 1 billion streams in all music platforms, becoming the fastest Indian album to do so. The soundtrack remains the only work that does not feature the collaboration between Vishnuvardhan and Yuvan Shankar Raja, who had been his norm composer in all his previous films.

"Raataan Lambiyan" and "Ranjha" featured on the Billboard Hot 100 and the Billboard Global 200. Songs topped the national and global charts, in all music and video platforms. The song "Mann Bharrya 2.0" was recreation of B Praak's single "Mann Bharrya" released in April 2017. It was recreated by the same team of original song with singer B Praak and composer-songwriter Jaani.

== Release ==
The film was scheduled to release theatrically on 3 July 2020 but was delayed due to the COVID-19 pandemic. On 20 February 2021, the new release date was announced as 2 July 2021, before being postponed again. The film premiered on 12 August 2021 on Amazon Prime Video. On 31 August 2021, Amazon stated that Shershaah had become the most watched Indian film on the platform. The film was streamed by audiences in over 4,100 Indian cities and towns, and in 210 countries and territories.

== Reception ==
Upon release, Shershaah received mostly positive reviews from critics, who praised Malhotra and Advani's performances and the action sequences but some criticised the writing of the film. On the review aggregator website Rotten Tomatoes, 50% of 14 critics' reviews are positive, with an average rating of 5.1/10.

Taran Adarsh of Bollywood Hungama gave the film 3.5 stars out of 5 calling Shershaah "power-packed" and wrote, "Shershaah salutes the valor, courage and bravery of Kargil war hero Captain Vikram Batra, Inspirational and emotional. A game changer for Sidharth Malhotra. Commanding act. Unmissable!. Director VishnuVardhan narrates the story of Shershaah with utmost competency. Screenwriting is absorbing for most parts. The war sequences are executed with flourish. The finale is sure to leave you moist-eyed."

Anna M. M. Vetticad of Firstpost gave the film 2.75 stars out of 5 opining, "Captain Vikram Batra biopic is gripping as an Army procedural", noting it as Malhotra's best performance since Kapoor and Sons, and that "VishnuVardhan could not have found a more suitable mainstream star to join him in memorialising one of India's favorite war heroes." Saibal Chatterjee of NDTV gave the film 2.5 stars (out of 5) by saying Malhotra "has what it takes to portray Batra with efficiency." He concluded, "The cinematic firepower and flint take Shershaah much higher - and further - as a war drama."

Anupama Chopra of Film Companion wrote, "The film's clunky structure doesn't allow it to accrue tension or exert a grip, but it comes to life in the second hour once the battle begins." Shubhra Gupta of The Indian Express gave the film 2 stars out of 5 saying that, "the Sidharth Malhotra film has neither the necessary drama inherent in a cracking war film, nor does it raise patriotic goosebumps." Writing for Hindustan Times, Rohan Nahaar praised the screenplay but criticised the direction stating that the "smartly choreographed action, a reverent tone, and Sidharth Malhotra's sincere performance can't make up for Vishnuvardhan's uneven direction."

== Accolades ==
Award (Note: Awards, festivals and organizations are in alphabetical order.)	Date of ceremony (Note: Date is linked to the article about the awards held that year, wherever possible.)	Category	Recipient(s)	Result	Ref.
Filmfare Awards	30 August 2022	Best Film	Shershaah	Won	
Filmfare Awards	30 August 2022	Best Director	Vishnuvardhan	Won	
Filmfare Awards	30 August 2022	Best Screenplay	Sandeep Shrivastava	Nominated	
Filmfare Awards	30 August 2022	Best Dialogue	Sandeep Shrivastava	Nominated	
Filmfare Awards	30 August 2022	Best Actor	Sidharth Malhotra	Nominated	
Filmfare Awards	30 August 2022	Best Actress	Kiara Advani	Nominated	
Filmfare Awards	30 August 2022	Best Music Director	Tanishk Bagchi, Jasleen Royal, Javed-Mohsin, B Praak, Jaani	Won	
Filmfare Awards	30 August 2022	Best Lyricist	Jaani – (for song "Mann Bharrya 2.0")	Nominated	
Filmfare Awards	30 August 2022	Best Lyricist	Tanishk Bagchi – (for song "Raatan Lambiyan")	Nominated	
Filmfare Awards	30 August 2022	Best Male Playback Singer	B Praak – (for song "Mann Bharrya")	Won	
Filmfare Awards	30 August 2022	Best Male Playback Singer	Jubin Nautiyal – (for song "Raatan Lambiyan")	Nominated	
Filmfare Awards	30 August 2022	Best Female Playback Singer	Asees Kaur – (for song "Raatan Lambiyan")	Won	
Filmfare Awards	30 August 2022	Best Cinematography	Kamaljeet Negi	Nominated	
Filmfare Awards	30 August 2022	Best Editing	A. Sreekar Prasad	Won	
Filmfare Awards	30 August 2022	Best Costume Design	Eka Lakhani	Nominated	
Filmfare Awards	30 August 2022	Best Background Score	John Stuart Eduri	Nominated	
Filmfare Awards	30 August 2022	Best Art Direction	Amit Ray & Shubrata Chakraborty	Nominated	
Filmfare Awards	30 August 2022	Best Action	Stefan Richter & Sunil Rodrigues	Won	
Filmfare Awards	30 August 2022	Best Special Effects	Red Chillies VFX	Nominated	
International Indian Film Academy Awards	3–4 June 2022	Best Film	Shershaah	Won	
International Indian Film Academy Awards	3–4 June 2022	Best Director	Vishnuvardhan	Won	
International Indian Film Academy Awards	3–4 June 2022	Best Story (Original)	Sandeep Shrivastava	Nominated	
International Indian Film Academy Awards	3–4 June 2022	Best Screenplay	Sandeep Shrivastava	Won	
International Indian Film Academy Awards	3–4 June 2022	Best Actor	Sidharth Malhotra	Nominated	
International Indian Film Academy Awards	3–4 June 2022	Best Actress	Kiara Advani	Nominated	
International Indian Film Academy Awards	3–4 June 2022	Best Music Director (Note: Shared with A. R. Rahman for Atrangi Re.)	Tanishk Bagchi, Jasleen Royal, Javed-Mohsin, B Praak, Jaani	Won	
International Indian Film Academy Awards	3–4 June 2022	Best Lyricist	Tanishk Bagchi – (for song "Raatan Lambiyan")	Nominated	
International Indian Film Academy Awards	3–4 June 2022	Best Lyricist	B Praak, Jaani – (for song "Mann Bharrya 2.0")	Nominated	
International Indian Film Academy Awards	3–4 June 2022	Best Male Playback Singer	Jubin Nautiyal – (for song "Raatan Lambiyan")	Won	
International Indian Film Academy Awards	3–4 June 2022	Best Male Playback Singer	B Praak – (for song "Mann Bharrya")	Nominated	
International Indian Film Academy Awards	3–4 June 2022	Best Female Playback Singer	Asees Kaur – (for song "Raatan Lambiyan")	Won	
International Indian Film Academy Awards	3–4 June 2022	Best Female Playback Singer	Jasleen Royal – (for song "Ranjha")	Nominated	
Mirchi Music Awards	19 March 2022	Album of The Year	Shershaah	Won	
Mirchi Music Awards	19 March 2022	Listeners' Choice Album of the Year	Shershaah	Nominated	
Mirchi Music Awards	19 March 2022	Music Composer of The Year	Tanishk Bagchi – (for song "Raatan Lambiyan")	Won	
Mirchi Music Awards	19 March 2022	Music Composer of The Year	Jasleen Royal – (for song "Ranjha")	Nominated	
Mirchi Music Awards	19 March 2022	Lyricist of The Year	Tanishk Bagchi – (for song "Raatan Lambiyan")	Won	
Mirchi Music Awards	19 March 2022	Lyricist of The Year	Jaani – (for song "Mann Bharrya 2.0")	Nominated	
Mirchi Music Awards	19 March 2022	Lyricist of The Year	Anvita Dutt – (for song "Ranjha")	Nominated	
Mirchi Music Awards	19 March 2022	Male Vocalist of The Year	Jubin Nautiyal – (for song "Raatan Lambiyan")	Nominated	
Mirchi Music Awards	19 March 2022	Female Vocalist of The Year	Asees Kaur – (for song "Raatan Lambiyan")	Nominated	
Mirchi Music Awards	19 March 2022	Song of The Year	"Raataan Lambiyan"	Won	
Mirchi Music Awards	19 March 2022	Song of The Year	"Ranjha"	Nominated	
Mirchi Music Awards	19 March 2022	Song of The Year	"Mann Bharryaa 2.0"	Nominated	
Mirchi Music Awards	19 March 2022	Listeners' Choice Song of the Year	"Raataan Lambiyan"	Nominated	
Mirchi Music Awards	19 March 2022	Listeners' Choice Song of the Year	"Ranjha"	Nominated	
Mirchi Music Awards	19 March 2022	Listeners' Choice Song of the Year	"Mann Bharryaa 2.0"	Nominated	
Mirchi Music Awards	19 March 2022	Best Song Producer – Programming & Arranging	Tanishk Bagchi – (for song "Raatan Lambiyan")	Nominated	
National Film Awards	24 August 2023	Special Jury Award (Feature Film)	Producer: Karan Johar; Director: Vishnuvardhan	Won	

== Historical accuracy ==
The talk Vishal Batra gives in the beginning of the film resembles the TEDx talk he gave in 2017 (evident from the same title and similar clothes.)

The film depicts Vikram Batra and Dimple Cheema getting married, while she is unaware. In an interview with The Quint in 2016, Cheema revealed that, "while doing the parikrama of the Nishan Sahib, he was walking behind me. On completing the parikrama, he said 'Congratulations, Mrs. Batra'. I swirled around to see him holding one end of my dupatta." In Sikhism, completion of four rounds around the Nishan Sahib is considered a marriage ritual. The depiction of Batra filling Cheema's hair parting with his blood (a Hindu marriage ritual) was also confirmed by her in the same interview.

The film shows Batra telling his friend, "I'll either come back after raising the Indian flag in victory or return wrapped in it. But I'll come for sure." Although, his twin, Vishal Batra confirmed Batra saying the words to "a friend", it has been disputed as to who he actually said those words to.

The movie portrays a Pakistani troop threatening Batra over the radio. Batra himself narrated this himself in his famous interview with Barkha Dutt recalling, "Oh Shershaah, you've come. Don't try to come up, otherwise you'll have a tough time... and that was the time they gave us a challenge and my guys they... they went wild." The film also shows Pakistani troops asking the Indians to give them Madhuri Dixit. This has been previously confirmed by others who served in the unit.

In the aftermath of capture of 5140, Batra is shown to use a journalist's satellite phone to call Cheema. In reality, he had borrowed a satellite phone but had called his father instead. His incomplete message, "Daddy, I've captured", was initially misinterpreted as a message of his capture.

While climbing 4875, Batra is shown to charge at a bunker and kill three enemy troops alone in hand-to-hand combat. However, in reality, he had killed five enemy troops and sustained multiple injuries while doing so.

Unlike the film, Batra died instantly after being hit by the sniper and did not live to see his men capture the point.
