= Yogesh Kumar Joshi =

Indian army officer (born 1962)

Lieutenant General Yogesh Kumar Joshi PVSM UYSM AVSM VrC SM ADC
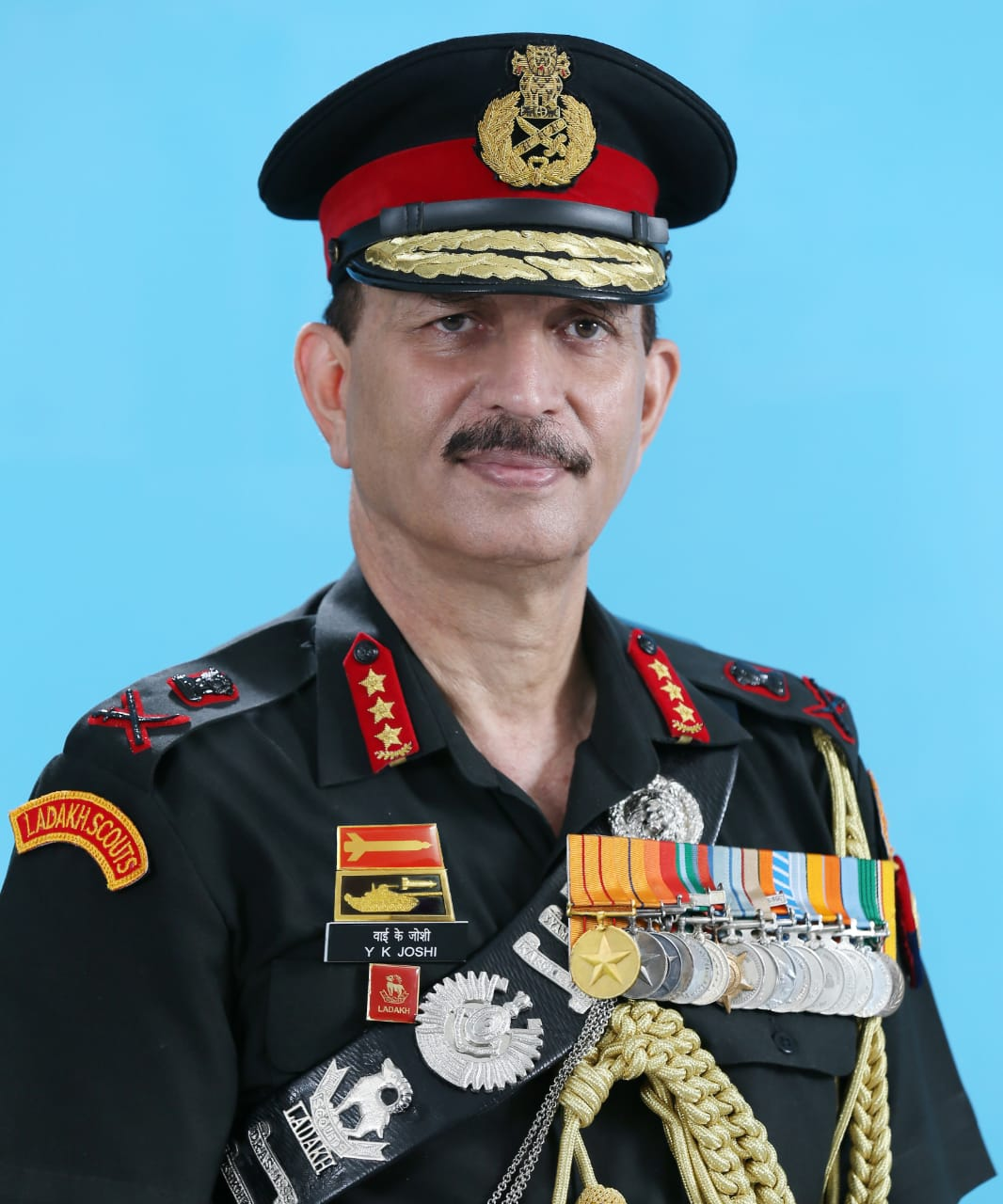
- Official portrait, 2020

General Officer Commanding-in-Chief Northern Command
- In office 1 February 2020 – 31 January 2022
- Chief of Army Staff: Manoj Mukund Naravane
- Preceded by: Ranbir Singh
- Succeeded by: Upendra Dwivedi

Personal details
- Born: 5 January 1962 (age 64)
- Nickname(s): Joe; Chanakya

Military service
- Allegiance: India
- Branch/service: Indian Army
- Years of service: 12 June 1982 – 31 January 2022
- Rank: Lieutenant General
- Unit: 13 JAK RIF
- Commands: Northern Command; XIV Corps; 3 Infantry Division; 114 Infantry Brigade; 13 JAK RIF
- Battles/wars: Kargil War: Battle of point 5140; Battle of Point 4875; Battle of Tiger Hill
- Service number: IC-40500A
- Awards: Param Vishisht Seva Medal; Uttam Yudh Seva Medal; Ati Vishisht Seva Medal; Vir Chakra; Sena Medal

Lieutenant General Yogesh Kumar Joshi, PVSM, UYSM, AVSM, VrC, SM, ADC (born 5 January 1962) is a former general officer of the Indian Army. He last served as the General Officer Commanding-in-Chief Northern Command. He earlier served as the Chief of staff of the Northern Command, and commanded the Leh-based Fire & Fury Corps.

During the Kargil War, he was awarded the Vir Chakra for his command of the 13th Battalion, The Jammu and Kashmir Rifles which captured the strategically vital Point 5140.

He is currently the Director General of the Center for Contemporary China Studies, a think-tank of the Government of India functioning under the Ministry of External Affairs.

== Early life and education ==
Joshi was born to Rampal Joshi, from Faridabad, Haryana. His father was an employee of Indian Railways and was part of the railways’ accounts department. He was schooled in Jhansi and Faridabad where he attended the Kendriya Vidyalaya. He joined the National Defence Academy as part of the 60th course. Part of the Kilo squadron at the NDA, he graduated in 1981 and joined the Indian Military Academy, Dehradun.

== Military career ==
After graduating from the IMA, Joshi was commissioned into the 13th battalion, the Jammu and Kashmir Rifles on 12 June 1982. In the early years of service, he served as an instructor at the Infantry School, Mhow where he was responsible to impart training on Anti Tank Weapon Systems. He later attended the Defence Services Staff College, Wellington and was subsequently posted to the Military Operations Directorate. He also served as a Military Observer in the United Nations Angola Verification Mission III.

=== Kargil War ===
When the Kargil war broke out, Joshi was a Lieutenant Colonel and the commanding officer of his battalion, 13 JAK RIF, then stationed at Dras. The battalion launched four attacks, most successful of which was on Point 4875. Captured on 4 July, the feature was renamed Batra Top, after Captain Vikram Batra, who was posthumously awarded the Param Vir Chakra.

Under Joshi's leadership, the battalion was extremely successful during the war, and was conferred with the title of the Bravest of the Brave. The battalion received more than 25 gallantry awards, including two Param Vir Chakras (the other recipient was Rifleman Sanjay Kumar, PVC), eight Vir Chakras (including him) and fourteen Sena Medals. His gesture of giving honourable burials to Pakistani troops who perished on the icy heights of Kargil fetched him praise.

=== Vir Chakra Citation ===
The citation for the Vir Chakra reads as follows:

Gazette Notification: 18 Pres/2000,15-8-99

Operation: - Date of Award: 15 Aug 1999

CITATION

LIEUTENANT COLONEL YOGESH KUMAR JOSHI

13 JAMMU AND KASHMIR RIFLES

Lieutenant Colonel Yogesh Kumar Joshi, 13 Jammu & Kashmir Rifles, was tasked to capture the strategically vital Point 5140 in Drass Sector during "Operation Vijay". Lieutenant Colonel Joshi conceived a brilliant plan catering for coordinated action to achieve total surprise and psychological dominance over the tactically better positioned enemy. He also personally supervised all preliminary actions before the attack. During the attack on 20 June 1999, Lieutenant Colonel Joshi kept motivating his company commanders and kept staging himself forward with utter disregard to his personal safety. Displaying exceptional presence of mind, he responded to changing battle situations in a most competent manner, his leading from the front and being well forward in battle acted as a morale booster to the attacking troops. Drawing inspiration from him, the attacking companies surmounted the heavy odds, rugged in-hospitable terrain and enemy fire to close in and capture the objective, important peak of Point 5140.

Lieutenant Colonel Yogesh Kumar Joshi displayed exemplary leadership, outstanding command and control and valour beyond the call of duty, leading to killing of six enemy intruders and recapturing of the strategically vital Point 5140 in Drass Sector.

=== Post-war career ===
In 2005, Joshi was appointed the Defence attaché at the Embassy of India, Beijing. He spent about three years as the DA during which he negotiated the technicalities of the first India-China joint exercise “Hand-in-Hand” in Kunming in 2007. Promoted to the rank of Brigadier, Joshi took over command of the 114 Infantry Brigade in Chushul in eastern Ladakh. He subsequently attended the National Defence College as part of the 52nd course in 2012.

=== General officer ===
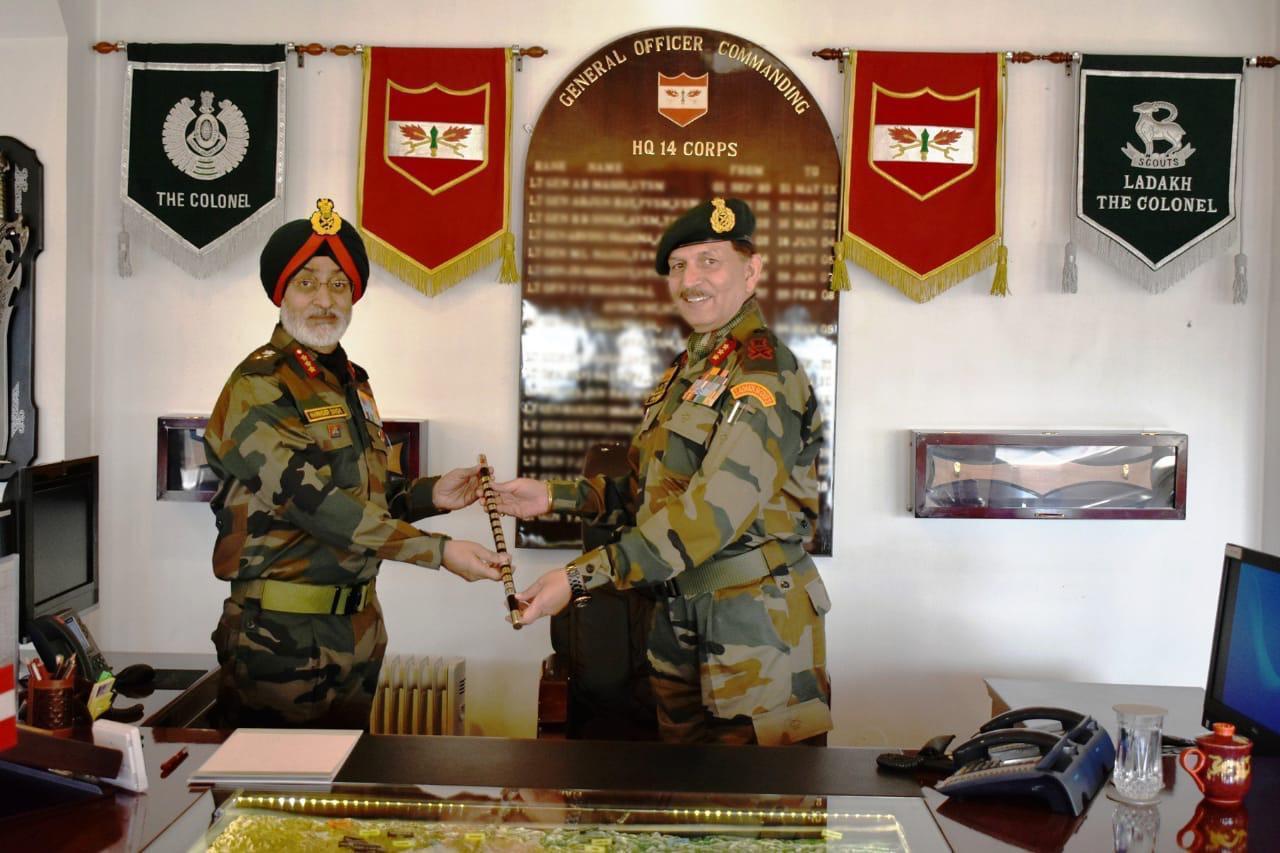
Joshi handing over command of XIV Corps to Lt Gen Harinder Singh

Joshi was promoted to the rank of Major general and appointed General officer commanding of the 3rd Infantry Division. Christened Trishul Division, it is part of the XIV Corps and headquartered at Karu in Ladakh. In 2017, promoted to the rank of Lieutenant General, Joshi took over as the Director General Infantry at Army Headquarters. He spearheaded the modernisation drive of the Infantry and a large number of weapon systems and equipment were procured under his tutelage. On 1 September 2018, he took command of the XIV Corps in Leh, whose area of responsibility was the whole of Ladakh. For his command of XIV Corps, he was awarded the Uttam Yudh Seva Medal on 26 January 2020. After a year-long tenure, he moved to Headquarters Northern Command as the Chief of Staff.

After a short stint as COS, Joshi was appointed the General Officer Commanding-in-Chief Northern Command. He took over from Lieutenant General Ranbir Singh on 1 February 2020. He was the Northern Army Commander during the 2020–2021 China–India skirmishes. As Army Commander, he is credited with spearheading the Indian response to the PLA's attempt to alter the status quo on the Line of Actual Control by use of force in 2020 during Operation Snow Leopard. After a two year stint as Northern Army Commander, he relinquished command, handing over to Lieutenant General Upendra Dwivedi and retired from the Army on 31 January 2022.

== Post-retirement ==
On 27 April 2023, Joshi was appointed Director General of the Center for Contemporary China Studies, a think-tank of the Government of India functioning under the Ministry of External Affairs.

== In popular culture ==
Joshi has been portrayed twice in films, first by actor Sanjay Dutt in LOC: Kargil (2003) and second by actor Shataf Figar in Shershaah (2021). His autobiography, Who Dares Wins, was published in 2025.

== Awards and decorations ==
Joshi was awarded the Param Vishisht Seva Medal in 2022, the Uttam Yudh Seva Medal in 2020, the Ati Vishisht Seva Medal in 2016, the Sena Medal in 2014 and the Vir Chakra on Independence Day 1999 for gallantry in Operation Vijay.

Param Vishisht Seva Medal	Uttam Yuddh Seva Medal		Ati Vishisht Seva Medal
Vir Chakra	Sena Medal	Samanya Seva Medal	Special Service Medal
Operation Vijay Star	Siachen Glacier Medal	Operation Vijay Medal	Operation Parakram Medal
Sainya Seva Medal	High Altitude Medal	Videsh Seva Medal	50th Anniversary of Independence Medal
30 Years Long Service Medal	20 Years Long Service Medal	9 Years Long Service Medal	UNAVEM III Medal

== Dates of rank ==
Insignia	Rank	Component	Date of rank
	Second Lieutenant	Indian Army	12 June 1982
	Lieutenant	Indian Army	12 June 1984
	Captain	Indian Army	12 June 1987
	Major	Indian Army	12 June 1993
	Lieutenant-Colonel	Indian Army	25 May 1999
	Colonel	Indian Army	1 March 2006
	Brigadier	Indian Army	1 February 2010 (substantive, with seniority from 17 January 2009)
	Major General	Indian Army	1 April 2015 (substantive, with seniority from 8 June 2012)
	Lieutenant General	Indian Army	20 May 2017

== See also ==
- Anuj Nayyar
- Yeh Dil Maange More!

Military offices
Preceded by Santosh Kumar Upadhya	General Officer Commanding XIV Corps; 31 August 2018 - 10 October 2019	Succeeded by Harinder Singh
Preceded by SK Sharma	Chief of Staff, Northern Command; 25 October 2019 - January 2020	Succeeded by Bansi Ponnappa
Preceded by Ranbir Singh	General Officer Commanding-in-Chief Northern Command; 1 February 2020 - 31 January 2022	Succeeded by Upendra Dwivedi
