= Sher Khan =

Sher Khan or Shir Khan may refer to:

== Film ==
- Sher Khan (1962 film), a Bollywood film of 1962 about Sher Shah Suri by Radhakant
- Sher Khan (1981 film), a Pakistani Punjabi film starring Sultan Rahi, Anjuman and Mustafa Qureshi
- Sher Khan (1998 film), a Bollywood action film of 1982 featuring Jack Gaud

== People ==
- Sher Khan of Bengal, governor of North Bengal 1268–1272
- Sher Shah Suri (1486–1545), founder of the Sur Empire and ruler of northern India in the 16th century
- Sher Khan Babi, founder of the Babi dynasty of India
- Sher Afghan Quli Khan (died 1607), Mughal courtier of the 17th century
- Sher Akbar Khan (born 1957), Pakistani politician
- Sher Ali Khan (1825–1879), Amir of Afghanistan between 1863 and 1879
- Sher Khan Nashir, Afghan politician from Kunduz Province in the 1930s
- Karnal Sher Khan, Pakistani soldier martyr decorated for the highest of gallantry
- Karim Lala, Afghan mafia don of Bombay

== Places ==
=== Afghanistan ===
- Sher Khan Bandar, a border town in Kunduz Province of Afghanistan

=== India ===
- Kheri Sher Khan, village in Haryana, India

=== Iran ===
- Shir Khan, Kermanshah
- Shir Khan, Markazi
- Shir Khan, Razavi Khorasan
- Shir Khan, South Khorasan
- Shir Khan, Zaveh, Razavi Khorasan Province

== Other ==
- Shere Khan, a fictional Bengal tiger and main antagonist of The Jungle Book
- Sher Khan, antagonist in the 1973 Indian film Zanjeer and its 2013 remake, portrayed by Pran and Sanjay Dutt respectively
- Sher Khan, an antagonist portrayed by Danny Denzongpa in the 1991 Indian film Sanam Bewafa
- Sher Khan, an antagonist in the 2009 Indian film Magadheera
