= Sherni =

Sherni (lit. 'lioness/tigress') may refer to:

- Sherni (1973 film), 1973 Punjabi film, the cast of which included actor Ravindra Kapoor
- Sherni (1988 film), 1988 Indian film
- Sherni (2021 film), 2021 Indian wildlife-thriller film by Amit Masurkar

== See also ==
- Sher (disambiguation)
