= Sher-E-Hindustan =

Sher-E-Hindustan (lit. 'Lion of India') may refer to:

- Sher-E-Hindustan (1998 film), an Indian Hindi-language action drama cast zafran azaan shaiq yahya
- Sher-e-Hind, the highest military decoration of the provisional Azad Hind Government of Subhas Chandra Bose
- Ranjit Singh (titled Sher-e-Hind), founder and ruler of the Sikh Empire from 1801 to 1839

== See also ==
- Asiatic lion, species found only in India
- The Lion of Punjab (disambiguation)
- Sher (disambiguation)
- Hindustan (disambiguation)
