= Shershah Syed =

Pakistani physician and surgeon (born 1953)

- Born: Shershah Syed; 1953 (age 72–73); Karachi, Sindh, Pakistan
- Education: FRCOG, Royal College of Obstetricians and Gynaecologists, London; Diploma Emergency Obstetrical Care, Uppsala University, Sweden
- Occupations: Obstetrician and Gynaecologist
- Spouse: Tayyaba Fatema (Paediatrician)
- Website: Dow 79 Personalities web page

Shershah Syed (born 1953) is a Pakistani physician and surgeon, known for his work in obstetrics and maternal health. He was involved in providing emergency medical assistance to victims of the 2010 Pakistan floods. He is a former president of the Society of Obstetricians & Gynecologists of Pakistan (2007-2010), and the current president of the International Society of Fistula Surgeons (ISOFS) and the Pakistan National Forum on Women's Health.

== Career ==
After MBBS from Dow Medical College, he moved to the UK and trained and worked in Ireland to become an obstetrician and gynecologist. He attained an MRCOG before returning to Pakistan where he started working for the Government of Sindh and was posted as assistant professor at Dow Medical College.

He subsequently joined Sobhraj Maternity Hospital as MS. After a short stint at the Nawabshah Medical College, he joined the Qatar Hospital in Orangi Town.

Shershah has worked for the Pakistan Medical Association, Pakistan Medical and Dental Council, Society of Obstetrician and Gynecologists Pakistan (SOGP), Amnesty International, and ISOFS.

In 2012, his book, Vision: Not Just a Dream, was reviewed by Dawn. Two years later, in 2014, a biography about him was published in Sindhi language.

== Fellowship and awards ==
RCOG traveling award to work at FISTULA Hospital, Addis Ababa, Ethiopia 1994

RCOG Menopause Award 1996 to attend a meeting in London and to work with Dr. John Studd's menopause clinic

Clinton Global Initiative guest invited by President Clinton in New York in November 2009

FIGO (Federation of Obstetrica Gynaecologica) Distinguish Community Obstetrician award received in 2003 at Santiago Chile.

Pride of Karachi Award by K-Electric in 2014

Sheikh Hamdan Bin Rashid Al Maktoum Award 2012 for the treatment of genital tract fistula and rehabilitation of fistula victims

Nomination among 100 most inspiring individuals delivering for girls and women by Women Deliver in 2011

== Humanitarian / Philanthropic Activities ==
After receiving training in the treatment of infertility, on his return to Pakistan he was overwhelmed seeing the plight of women in the country. For the first time in his practice he encountered pregnant women dying in great numbers due to avoidable causes and noticed that more than six hundred thousand women were having complications because of pregnancy, like Fistula. This depressed him changed his entire concept of practice and he lost interest in infertility and started working to prevent maternal death and suffering of women. He also realized that young girls were also suffering badly and they were forcefully married when they are merely children. Girls were being murdered by their family members on the name of honor killing. He started working against violence against women with UNICEF and UNFPA.

Realizing that the maternal death rate cannot be decreased without providing care to pregnant women and that will be only possible by training of midwives, with the help of UNICEF he established a number of new schools of midwifery in different parts of country.

=== Creating a Great Resource for Midwifery ===
As there were no midwifery textbooks in the local languages, which made teaching difficult, Syed began translating midwifery books into Urdu and Sindhi in collaboration with a group of journalists in Karachi. Thirteen books on midwifery and nursing, averaging more than 400 pages each, were translated from English into Urdu and Sindhi for teaching in the local languages. The work was carried out by a small group of friends and family, without government support.

== Bibliography ==
He has regularly writing in the DAWN the largest circulating English newspaper on issues related to medical education and the health care system in Pakistan.

While at Dow Medical College he published two novels:

- Chimniyan Jall Uth Gaen
- Laho Laho Zabanain

He has also authored and published a collection of four books :-

- ILMO AGAHIE KA SAFAR
- AGAHIE KAI CHIRAGH
- AGAHIE KAI NISHAN
- AMRAZ SAE AGAHIE OR HISPATALON KI TAREKH

=== Medical Publications ===
- Gynecological Oncology, Sadiqa Jaffery, Shershah Syed
- Textbook for Midwifery (Urdu)
- Emergency Obstetrical Care for Midwives (Urdu)
- Emergency Obstetrical Care for Family Physicians
- Where Women has no Doctor (Urdu)
- Easy Midwifery (Urdu) translation of Hesperian foundation publication.
- How to teach nursing (Urdu). A book for nursing tutors.
- Teaching Midwifery (Urdu). A book for midwifery tutors.
- Teaching paramedics and O.T. Technicians (Urdu).
- A health hand book for women with disability (Urdu). Hesperian foundation Publication.
- Where there is no doctor (Urdu). Hesperian foundation publication.

== Radio ==
He does a weekly radio program on FM105 called IMO AGAHIE KA SAFAR every Sunday to create awareness in fields like science, literature history and philosophy.
