= Kheri Sher Khan =

Coordinates: 29°34′N 76°17′E

Kheri Sher Khan is a village in Kaithal district in Haryana, India. It is a part of the village Matour. It is the last village of Kaithal towards Jind. The population is about 3000.

== Village features ==
- Dada Khera
- Large pond
- Shiv Mandir
- Kali Mandir
- Baba Bhramchari Ka Dera
- Peer Ka Dera
- Water Supply
- 33KV power House
- Bus Stand
- Fertile land
- Historical Well
- Wide Street
- Street Light
- Antique Houses

== Overview ==
Kheri Sher Khan is a small village located in Kaithal Tehsil of Kaithal district, Haryana, with a total of 525 families residing. The village of Kheri Sherkhan has a population of 2787, of which 1476 are males and 1311 are females according to the Population Census of 2011.

In Kheri Sher Khan village, the population of children aged 0-6 is 354, making up 12.70% of the total village population. The average Sex Ratio of Kheri Sherkhan village is 888, which is higher than the Haryana state average of 879. The Child Sex Ratio for Kheri Sherkhan, as per the census, is 893, higher than the Haryana average of 834.

Kheri Sher Khan village has a lower literacy rate compared to Haryana. In 2011, the literacy rate of Kheri Sher Khan village was 69.75%, compared to 75.55% of Haryana. In Kheri Sher Khan, male literacy stands at 80.84%, while the female literacy rate was 57.26%.

As per the constitution of India and the Panchayati Raj Act, Kheri Sher Khan village is administered by the Sarpanch (Head of the Village), who is the elected representative of the

== Work Profile ==
In Kheri Sher Khan village out of total population, 1306 were engaged in work activities. 69.68 % of workers describe their work as Main Work (Employment or Earning more than 6 Months) while 30.32 % were involved in Marginal activity providing livelihood for less than 6 months. Of 1306 workers engaged in Main Work, 269 were cultivators (owner or co-owner) while 344 were Agricultural labourer.

== Nearby villages of Kheri Sher Khan ==
- Mandi Kalan
- Chhatar
- Bhalang
- Kalasher
- Lodhar
