= Sher Mohammed =

Sher Mohammed, Mohammad or Muhammad may refer to:

- Ibn-e-Insha (Sher Muhammad Khan) (1927-1978), Pakistani leftist Urdu poet, humorist, travelogue writer and newspaper columnist
- Sher Khan Nashir, hereditary Grand Khan (Loe Khan) of the Kharoti (Ghilzai) tribe and governor of the Kunduz region of Afghanistan in the 1930s
- Sher Mohammad Akhundzada, governor of Helmand in Afghanistan 2001-2005
- Sher Mohammad Karimi (born 1945), Chief of Army Staff in the Military of Afghanistan
- Sher Mohammad Marri (1935-1993), chief of the Marri Baloch tribe in Pakistan
- Sher Muhammad, a Khan of Moghulistan
- Sher Mohammad, Indian cricketer
