= Battle of Behobeho =

Battle during the First World War

- Part of East African Campaign
Date	3–4 January 1917
Location	Behobeho, German East Africa 7°38′0″S 37°36′0″E
Result	Inconclusive

Belligerents
German Empire: German East Africa	British Empire

Commanders and leaders
(German Empire) Capt. Ernst Otto	(British Empire) Capt. Frederick Selous †
- Location within Tanzania Battle of Behobeho (Africa)

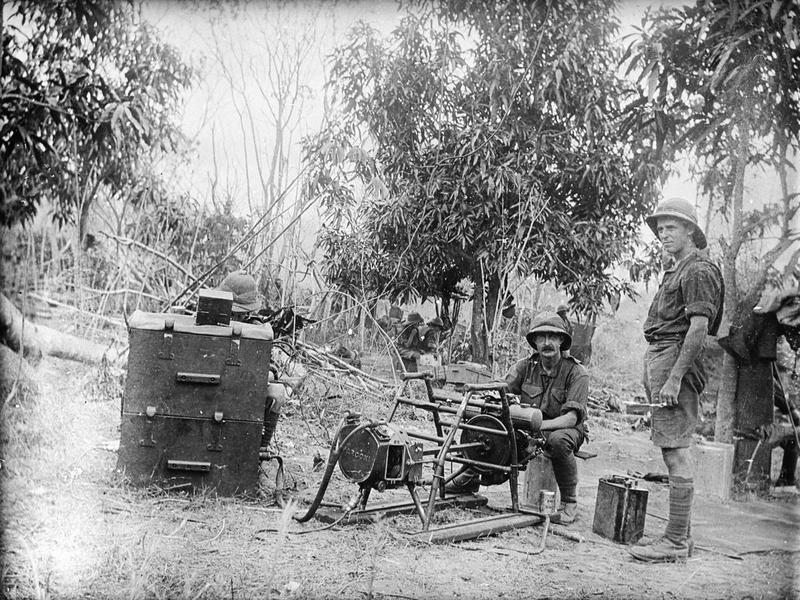
Ministry of Information First World War Official Collection German East African Campaign. Wireless operators Beho Ju (Beho Beho) January 1917.

The Battle of Behobeho was fought during the East African Campaign of World War I.

== The battle ==
After capturing the coastal capital of German East Africa, Dar es Salaam in September 1916, General Jan Smuts ordered his army's advance to halt due to a malaria pandemic that had devastated the soldiers. Shortly after the new year, the 25th Frontiersmen Battalion, led by famous hunter and explorer, Captain Frederick Selous, advanced into the interior of the colony, up the Rufiji River.

On the 3rd January a unit of British scouts ahead of the main battalion reported that a column of German soldiers was moving down the road. A skirmish ensued between the British and German soldiers. A German marksman reportedly killed Captain Frederick Selous during the battle when he raised his head while using binoculars to locate the enemy. It is said that because of Selous' fame the commander of the German forces in German East Africa at the time, Paul Emil von Lettow-Vorbeck, sent a letter of condolence to the British after his death.
