= Sher Ahmad Khan =

Khan of Makhad

Sher Ahmad Khan, known as Khan of Makhad, was the chief of the Sagri Khattaks, a branch of the Khattak tribe. He was also a Jagirdar of Shakardara in Kohat District in what is now Khyber Pakhtunkhwa, Pakistan. The dynasty was started by Ghazi Khan in the early 16th century during the reign of the Mughal Emperor Akbar. Ghazi Khan moved from Kohat to Makhad after conquering the area. According to Attock District Gazetteer, the Sagri Khattaks conquered the area up to East of Jehlum during Emperor Akbar's rein however this account is unsubstantiated. Khan of Makhad flourished under the rule of Ahmed Shah Durrani due to his alliance with the ruler. Since Makhad lies in bank of Indus River, its location was of great importance for the rulers.

Khans had a considerable Jagir and their income came from gold washings in River Indus, salt mines and agriculture. Ghulam Mustafa Khan, the great-grandfather of Sher Ahmed Khan was a man of great prominence. He resisted all Sikh and Afghan attempts to win him over. He not only held Makhad and Shakardara but also succeeded in an attack on fort of Jabi, garrisoned by Sikhs. Khan died in 1861 handing over the chieftainship to his eldest son Ghulam Mohammed Khan. He was one of three landed holders of Rawalpindi who were exempt from most of the provisions of Arms Act as "Great Sardars and Jagirdars of Punjab" (The Gazetteer of Attock District 1895). Sher Ahmed Khan was maternal uncle of Chief of Gakhars, Sultan Raja Erij Zaman Khan.

Sher Ahmad Khan married an Irish lady who became known as Elsi Makhad. The couple had no children of their own and hence, the khan of Makhad adopted his sister's daughter Anjuman Ara who is the sister of the chief of Ghakhars Sultan Raja Erij Zaman. Anjuman married Arif Khanzada and the couple had five children, Ambreen Khanzada, Sher Afghan Khanzada, Nasira Khanzada, Sher Ahemed Khanzada and Nadia Khanzada who were also brought up by the Khan of Makhad and his wife.Anjuman Ara begum is also aunt of Present Ghakhars chief Sultan Raja Sheraz Haider zaman.
