= Shera (Indian bodyguard) =

Indian celebrity bodyguard (born 1969)

Gurmeet Singh Jolly
- Born: 19 May 1969 (age 57); Dhuri, Punjab, India°(Bharat)
- Other name: Shera
- Education: Damodar Das Barfiwala High School, Andheri, Mumbai, India
- Occupation: Bodyguard
- Political party: Shiv Sena (2019–present)
- Children: 1
- Awards: Mr. Mumbai junior (1987); Mr. Maharashtra junior (1988); Best Security Award
- Website: https://tigersecurity.co.in/

Gurmeet Singh Jolly (born 19 May 1969), also known as Shera, is an Indian celebrity bodyguard. Shera has been serving Indian actor Salman Khan since 1995. Shera reportedly earns 15 lakh per month for his services to Salman Khan, which comes to two crore annually. Shera’s net worth is estimated to be 100 crore from his services to Salman Khan and the profit earned from his Tiger Security agency.

Shera runs a security firm named Tiger Security, and was in charge of Grammy Award-winning singer Justin Bieber’s security during his Mumbai concert in 2017.

== Early life and education ==
Shera was born on 19 May 1969 in Andheri, Mumbai, India. He studied at Damodar Das Barfiwala High School. Shera won Mumbai junior title for bodybuilding in 1987, and came second as Mr. Maharashtra junior in 1988. Gurmeet Singh Jolly joined Shiv Sena in October 2019.

== Salman Khan's bodyguard ==
Shera has been serving Bollywood actor Salman Khan since 1995, and said "Jab tak zinda hoon, bhai ke saath rahunga" (As long as I am alive I will stay with brother).
