= Falak Sher =

Falak Sher may refer to:

- Falak Sher (justice), Pakistani justice
- Malik Falak Sher Awan, Pakistani politician
