= The Lion of Punjab =

The Lion of Punjab (also Sher-e-Punjab) may refer to:

- Ranjit Singh (1780–1839), the founder and first Maharaja of the Sikh Empire
- Lala Lajpat Rai (1865–1928), Indian independence activist.
- The Lion of Punjab (film), a 2011 Indian Punjabi film
- Punjab Kesari (transl. Lion of Punjab), an Indian Hindi-language newspaper

== See also ==
- Ranjit Singh (disambiguation)
- Sher-e-Punjab: Maharaja Ranjit Singh, an Indian historical drama television series
- Sher-E-Punjab or KRPI, radio station in Ferndale, Washington, US
- Sher-e-Punjab (field hockey team), India
- Sher-E-Punjab T20 Cup, T20 cricket league in Punjab, India
- Sher-e-Hindustan (disambiguation)
