= Shir Khun =

Shir Khun شيرخون
- Village
- Location within Iran
- Coordinates: 35°15′08″N 59°36′15″E
- Country: Iran
- Province: Razavi Khorasan
- County: Zaveh
- Bakhsh: Central
- Rural District: Safaiyeh

Population (2006)
  - Total: 150
- Time zone: UTC+3:30 (IRST)
  - Summer (DST): UTC+4:30 (IRDT)

Shir Khun (Persian: شيرخون, also Romanized as Shīr Khūn; also known as Shīr Khān) is a village in Safaiyeh Rural District, in the Central District of Zaveh County, Razavi Khorasan Province, Iran. At the 2006 census, its population was 150, in 35 families.
