= Sher Shah (Karachi) =

Neighbourhood in Karachi, Pakistan

Coordinates: 24°54′N 67°00′E

SherShah is a neighbourhood in Karachi, Pakistan, that is located along the northern bank of the Lyari River. Sher Shah is home to the Morroro Graveyard - a vast cemetery that is centuries old. It is also the site of some of Karachi's recycling industry. In October 2010, Baloch groups gunned down 13 members of the Urdu-speaking muhajir terrorists in Sher Shah Kabari Market.

There are several ethnic groups in Kiamari Town including Urdu speakers, Sindhis, Punjabis, Kashmiris, Seraikis, Pakhtuns, Balochs, Memons, Bohras and Ismailis.

The Sher Shah neighbourhood and Sher Shah Bridge in Kiamari Town of Karachi is named after Sher Shah Bukhari Khurasani. Sher Shah Park in Wah Cantt, Pakistan, is named in the honour of Sher Shah Suri.
