= Richard Sher =

Richard Sher may refer to:

- Richard Sher (newscaster) (born 1941), newscaster for WJZ-TV in Baltimore, Maryland
- Richard Sher (producer) (1948–2015), radio and television producer, and host of the National Public Radio program Says You!
