= Vikram Batra =

Indian Army officer, recipient of Param Vir Chakra (1974–1999)

Captain Vikram Batra PVC
- Official military portrait, 1997
- Born: 9 September 1974; Palampur, Himachal Pradesh, India
- Died: 7 July 1999 (aged 24); Kargil, Jammu and Kashmir, India
- Education: DAV College; Indian Military Academy
- Military career
- Allegiance: India
- Branch: Indian Army
- Service years: 1997–1999
- Rank: Captain
- Service number: IC-57556H
- Unit: 13 Jammu And Kashmir Rifle
- Conflicts: Kargil War; Battle of Point 5140; Battle of Point 4875 †
- Awards: Param Vir Chakra

Captain Vikram Batra, PVC (9 September 1974 – 7 July 1999) was an Indian Army officer. He was posthumously awarded the Param Vir Chakra, India’s highest military decoration, for his actions during the Kargil War. On 7 July 1999, Batra was killed while fighting Pakistani troops at Point 4875 in the Kargil district of erstwhile Jammu and Kashmir.

== Early life and education ==
Batra was born on 9 September 1974 in Palampur, Himachal Pradesh to a Punjabi Hindu Khatri family. He was the third child of Girdhari Lal Batra, a government school principal, and Kamal Kanta Batra, a school teacher. The older of twin sons, he was born fourteen minutes before his brother, Vishal. The twins were nicknamed: 'Luv' (Vikram) and 'Kush' (Vishal), after the twin sons of the Hindu deity Rama, by their mother who was a professed devotee of Rama. He had two sisters: Seema and Nutan. As a young child, Batra received his primary education under the tutelage of his mother. He received his Primary Education at GPS Tikri-Mushehra (Chauntra-1) in Mandi district of Himachal Pradesh. He then attended the D.A.V. Public School in Palampur, where he studied up to middle standard. He received his senior secondary education at Central School in Palampur.

Batra also practiced a variety of sports at his school, which he represented at the national level during the Youth Parliamentary competitions in Delhi. He also represented his school and college in table tennis, Karate and other such sports. In 1990, he and his twin brother represented their school in table tennis at All India KVS Nationals. He also was a green belt holder in Karate and went on to attend a national level camp in Manali.

After completing his Class XII board examinations in 1992 from Central School, he attended DAV College, Chandigarh in B.Sc Medical Sciences. At college, he joined the Air Wing of the National Cadet Corps (NCC) while he was in his first year. During the Inter-State NCC Camp, he was adjudged the best NCC Air Wing cadet of Punjab Directorate in North Zone. He was selected and underwent a 40-day paratrooping training with his NCC Air Wing unit at Pinjore Airfield and Flying Club, about 35 kilometres away from Chandigarh. During the next two years in DAV, he remained a cadet of the Army Wing of NCC. In addition, he was the president of the Youth Service Club of his college.

He afterward qualified for the 'C' certificate in the NCC and attained the rank of Senior Under Officer in his NCC unit. Subsequently, in 1994, he was selected and took part in the Republic Day parade as an NCC cadet, and when he came back home, he told his parents that he wanted to join the Army. His maternal grandfather was also a soldier in the Indian Army. In 1995, while still in college, he was selected for the merchant navy at a shipping company headquartered in Hong Kong, but ultimately he changed his mind, aspiring to do "something great, something extraordinary, which may bring fame to my country." That same year he completed his bachelor's degree, graduating from the DAV College in Chandigarh.

Following completion of his bachelor's degree in 1995, he enrolled at Panjab University in Chandigarh, where he took admission in MA English course, so that he could prepare for the Combined Defence Services (CDS) Examination. He attended evening classes at the university and worked part-time in the morning as a branch manager of a travelling agency in Chandigarh.

In 1996, he passed the CDS examination and subsequently received a call for an interview at the Services Selection Board (SSB) at Allahabad and was selected. He was among the top 35 candidates in the Order of Merit. After completing a year (session 1995–96) towards the degree of MA in English, he left the university to join the Indian Military Academy.

== Military career ==
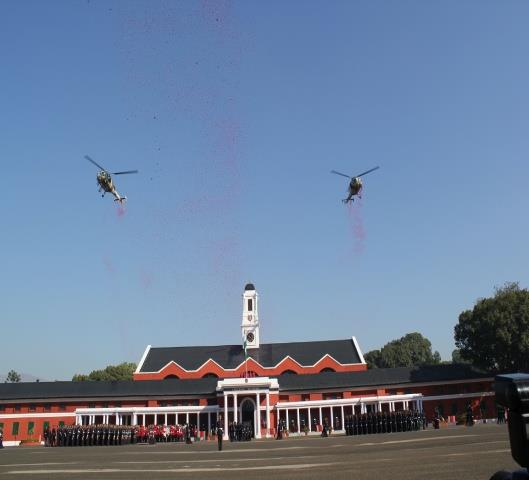
Indian Military Academy

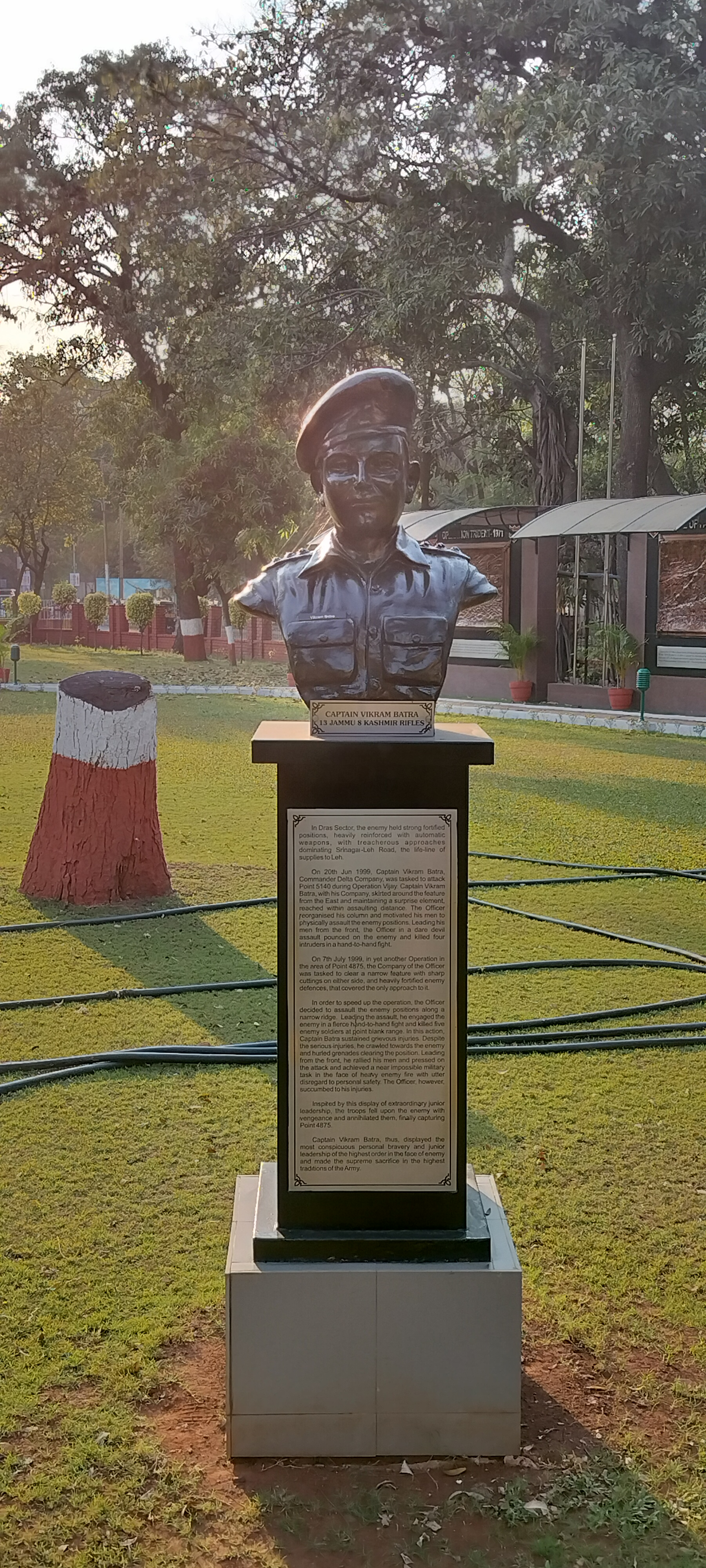
Bust of Captain Vikram Batra at the National War Memorial, Pune

Batra joined the Indian Military Academy (IMA) at Dehradun, in June 1996 in the Manekshaw Battalion. After completing his 19-month training course, he graduated from the IMA on 6 December 1997 and was commissioned as a lieutenant into the Indian Army. He was commissioned into the 13th battalion of the Jammu and Kashmir Rifles (13 JAK Rif). After commissioning, he was sent to Jabalpur, Madhya Pradesh for regimental training. The training lasted one month, from December 1997 to the end of January 1998.

On completion of this training he got his first posting at Sopore in Baramulla district of Jammu and Kashmir, an area with significant militant activity. In mid-March 1998, he was sent to the Infantry School at Mhow, Madhya Pradesh, where young Army officers are trained, for the Young Officer's Course. This training lasted five months until September 1998. Following completion of the course and being awarded alpha grading, he joined his battalion in Sopore in October 1998.

During his posting in Sopore, Batra had several encounters with militants. In one of those encounters when Batra was leading an ambush with his platoon into an area of dense forest, he escaped when bullet fired by a militant grazed his shoulder and struck one of Batra's men behind him, who was killed. Batra ordered his men to fire on the militants, and by morning all of the militants were killed. He believed that the bullet was meant for him and not his colleague.

In January 1999, Batra was sent on a Commando Course at Belgaum, Karnataka. The course lasted for two months and at the end of it, he was awarded the highest grading — the Instructor's Grade.

Every time when he came home to Palampur on leave, he would visit the Neugal Cafe. Batra last came home on leave from the army in 1999, during the Holi festival for a few days.

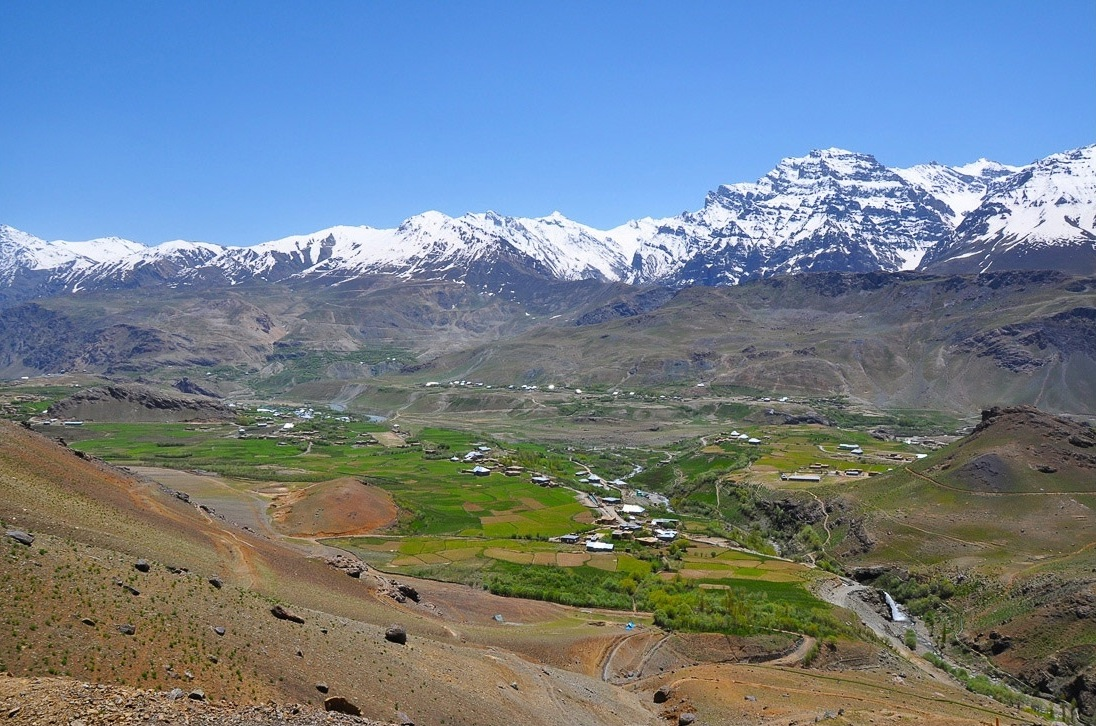
The town of Dras, the second coldest inhabited place in the world after Siberia, where temperatures fall as low as −60 degrees Celsius in winter.

After his leave, he returned to join his battalion in Sopore. The 13 JAK Rif, after completing its counter-insurgency operations tenure in Kashmir under 192 Mountain Brigade of 8 Mountain Division, received orders to proceed to Shahjahanpur, Uttar Pradesh. The battalion's advance party under Major Yogesh Kumar Joshi had reached its destination, when on 5 June, because of the outbreak of the war, its deployment orders were changed and the battalion received orders to move to Dras.

Batra informed his parents about his movement and assured them they need not worry about him. He would call his parents at least once in ten days. The last phone call he made was on 29 June 1999. This was the last time that Batra spoke to his mother.

Beginning his service as a lieutenant, he rose to the rank of captain.

== Awards and decorations ==
Based on Captain Vikram Batra's service, these awards have been estimated, Captain Batra was never seen wearing these ribbons across the internet.

Param Vir Chakra		Operation Vijay Star
Special Service Medal	Operation Vijay Medal	50th Independence Anniversary Medal

== Kargil War ==
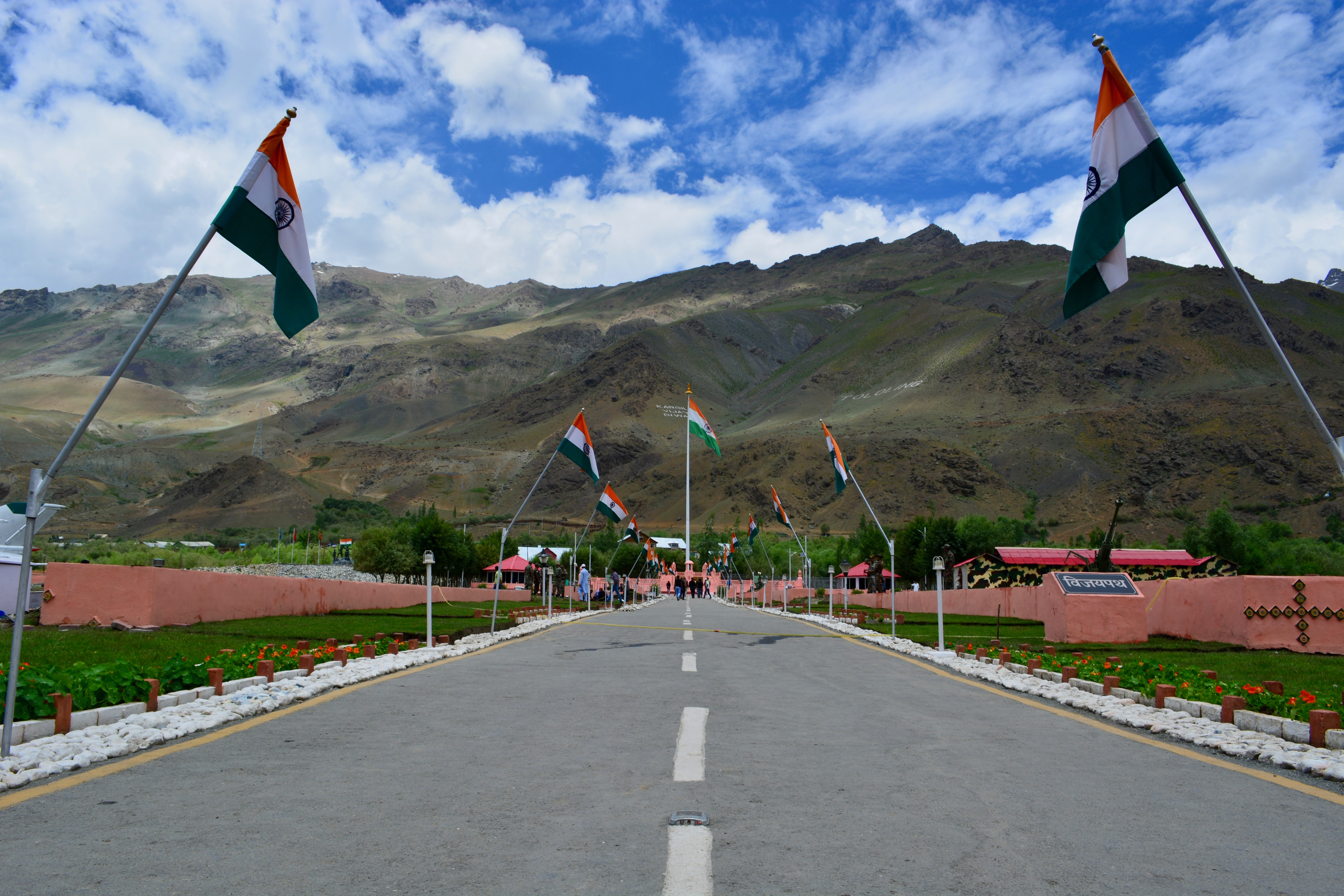
Kargil War Memorial with Tololing Ranges in the background at Dras

Batra's battalion, the 13 Jammu and Kashmir Rifles (13 JAK Rif), reached Dras on 6 June, and was placed under the command of 56 Mountain Brigade, and was given orders to act as reserves to the 2nd battalion of the Rajputana Rifles (2 Raj Rif) during their attack on Tololing mountain. The 18th battalion of The Grenadiers (18 Grenadiers) first attacked Tololing on 22 May, but were unable to capture the peak. 18 Grenadiers made four attempts to capture Tololing, but could only succeed in securing the lower slopes, while suffering heavy casualties. Eventually, 2 Raj Rif was assigned the mission of capturing Tololing and they did so on 13 June 1999.

After the capture of Tololing, 13 JAK Rif marched from Dras to Tololing, reaching their destination in 12 hours. Upon reaching, Alpha company of 13 JAK Rif took over Tololing and a portion of the Hump Complex from 18 Grenadiers.

=== Capture of Point 5140 ===
Batra's battalion was tasked with capturing the point 5140 on 17 June 1999. After the capture of Rocky Knob, located at the base of Point 5140 and about 800 metres away, The battalion's commanding officer, Joshi, fell back to Tololing, and started planning for their next objective — Point 5140.

On 18 June, the battalion carried out a detailed reconnaissance of Point 5140. Vikram Batra was put in charge of the delta company of the battalion. During the briefing, Vikram chose the words "Yeh Dil Mange More!" (This heart wants more! — from a popular advertising slogan of Pepsi) as his success signal for his company. D-Day was set for 19 June, and H-Hour at 20:30. (Note: H-Hour is the time at which an assault begins)

Under the cover of artillery fire, the two assault companies began climbing Point 5140 after midnight on 20 June. The artillery at Hump Complex had already begun its preparatory bombardment of Point 5140. The artillery guns stopped firing when the companies were 100 metres from their target.

By 0315 hours, both B and D Companies had reached the vicinity of Point 5140. B company reached the top of the feature first and assaulted from the left flank. By 0330 hours, B company had captured its objective, and at 0335 hours Jamwal radioed his command post, saying the words "Oh! Yeah, yeah, yeah!"

Batra decided to approach the hill from the rear, aiming to surprise the enemy, and to cut off their withdrawal route. Batra fired three rockets towards the bunkers on the east side of the feature, before attacking them. He and his men ascended the sheer rock-cliff, but as the group neared the top, the enemy pinned them on the face of the bare cliff with machine gun fire. Batra, along with five of his men, climbed up and after reaching the top, hurled two grenades at the machine gun post. Batra then killed three enemy soldiers single-handedly in close combat. He was seriously injured in the process, but insisted on regrouping his men to continue with the mission. He continued to lead his troops, and then charged at the next enemy position, capturing Point 5140. In all its actions, his company killed at least eight Pakistani intruders and recovered a heavy anti-aircraft machine gun. The remaining enemy soldiers fled.

At 0435 hours, Batra radioed his command post, saying the words "Yeh dil mange more!". Considerable quantities of arms and ammunition were recovered from the feature. The captured munitions indicated the enemy's strength was about a platoon. Neither B or D companies suffered any casualties in the battle. The capture of Point 5140 set in motion a string of successes, such as the captures of Point 5100, Point 4700, Junction Peak and the Three Pimple Complex.

After the capture of Point 5140, Batra was promoted to the rank of captain. General Ved Prakash Malik, the then Chief of Army Staff, called to congratulate him. All across the nation, his triumph was being played out on television screens.

On 26 June, shortly after the capture of Point 5140, 13 JAK Rif was ordered to move from Dras to Ghumri to rest, refit, and recoup. The battalion then moved to Mushkoh Valley on 30 June.

=== Capture of Point 4875 ===
The next assignment for Batra's battalion was to capture the Point 4875 On 1 July 1999, Major S Vijay Bhaskar, 'A' Company commander and Lt. Col. Joshi, commanding officer of the 13 JAK Rifles, conducted their preliminary reconnaissance, after climbing to a vantage point, and formulated an attack plan. Subsequently, on 2 July, General Officer Commanding 8 Mountain Division, Major General Mohinder Puri and Brigadier Rajesh Kumar Kakkar Commander 79 Mountain Brigades and Lt Col Y.K. Joshi, Commanding Officer 13 JAK Rifles gathered at 79 Mountain Brigades headquarters, to discuss the plan.

The battalion was deployed to firebase, located in a defiladed area, approximately 1500 metres from the Point 4875. Over the two days, on 2 and 3 July, weapons carriers from the 13 JAK Rifles and 28 Rashtriya Rifles dumped ammunition and heavy weapons.

At 1800 hours that same day, artillery bombardment of the enemy positions on Point 4875 commenced, and continued throughout the whole night. At 2030 hours, under cover of artillery fire, 'A' and 'C' Companies began climbing the Point 4875. Captain Vikram Batra was lying in a sleeping bag near the Mushkoh nullah, and was down with fever and fatigue. His commanding officer had ordered him to rest even though his battalion, 13 JAK Rifles, had launched its attack on Point 4875.

Both the assault companies were leading the offensive from the right flank but the attack was also halted by very effective sniper fire and small arms from Pakistani soldiers hiding behind rocks.

At 0430 hours, the two companies deployed their automatic weapons and began to fire at the well-fortified enemy positions at the top of the feature. At around 1015 hours on 5 July, the commanding officer of 'C' company informed the battalion commander about their situation which prompted Lt Col Joshi to personally fire two Fagot missiles in quick succession from the fire base which neutralised the enemy position. The Indian troops then promptly began advancing again. By 1300 hours, these troops had captured Point 4875. They then consolidated their hold on Point 4875, however the Indian troops continued to receive enemy artillery and machine-gun fire from Pimple 2 and area North of Point 4875.

The Indian victory would not have been complete without the capture of 'Area Flat Top', an adjacent peak and part of enemy defences on Point 4875. The 13 JAK Rifles had captured Flat top feature of Point 4875 on the afternoon of 5 July after a fierce battle with Pakistani forces. But the enemy launched an immediate counterattack to take back the Area Flat Top they had lost. Capt NA Nagappa held the Area flat top against the counterattacking Pakistani force. Capt Nagappa was seriously injured and incapacitated during this battle. Taking advantage of this situation, the Pakistanis started climbing faster.

Batra, who was observing the situation from base, went to his commanding officer and volunteered. Seeing him unwell, the commanding officer did not want him to go but Batra insisted on it. That same day, the enemy launched a second counterattack on Flat Top and although the Indian troops succeeded in beating back this, too, they urgently needed reinforcements. Several of his battalion's soldiers volunteered to accompany Batra even before any Company could be ordered.

Just before leaving, Batra along with the 25 men of his Delta Company, who were to accompany him, prayed at the Durga Mata temple. It was pitch black night when they began the climb. Having heard a wireless message from the base that Sher Shah (Batra's code name) was coming, a cheer went up among the Indian soldiers on top. The commander ordered them to hold their ground until Sher Shah arrived and then he would take over.

Batra, who was still recovering from his own wounds he received in the battle of Point 5140, wanted to reach the top to rescue his fellow soldiers and carry out reconnaissance of the ledge where the enemy soldiers were. En route to the top, Batra spotted a Pakistani machine gun position firing at the trapped Indian soldiers. Crouching, he moved toward the machine gun position, hiding behind rocks whenever possible. As he reached close to the enemy's machine gun position he lobbed a grenade, destroying the machine gun position. Before first light on the 7th, the troops succeeded in knocking out two more enemy machine guns, however, firing from the ledge continued. Batra's platoon soon reached the ledge, though by this time it was broad daylight.

At 0530 hours Lt. Col. Joshi spoke to Batra and asked him to reconnoitre the area. Batra, accompanied by Subedar Raghunath Singh and Major Bhat, his artillery observation officer, took out a patrol to recce a route to re-inforce Naveen from a flank. Batra located the position of the enemy sangar on the ledge from which enemy machine guns were holding up the advance of his company. At this juncture, Batra, realising there was no way from the left or right, decided to make a direct assault in daylight itself. Under heavy fire from enemy machine guns and grenade firing launchers, Batra moved forward, screaming the battle cry of JAK RIF – Durga mata ki jai, and charged the sangar firing incessantly from his AK-47. He sustained grievous injuries in the process, yet he continued his charge, with supporting fire from the rest of the patrol, and upon reaching the very narrow entrance of the sangar and taking the enemy by complete surprise, he killed 5 Pakistani soldiers in a close-quarter battle. The attack resulted in seven Pakistani soldiers killed after which the Indians gained a foothold on the ledge. Taken by surprise by the attack, Pakistanis started retreating. Batra and his men had gained the upper hand by now. Batra pulled out a bleeding Naveen from the bunker. However, there was still an enemy machine gun nest in action on that ledge that had to be silenced. Four Pakistani soldiers including a junior commissioned officer (JCO), who was guiding the fire on the Indian soldiers fighting outside, were manning the machine gun nest. Batra charged forward alone, killing all four members of the crew.

Batra realised one of his men had been shot. He resolved to evacuate him with Subedar Raghunath Singh. Batra exposed himself to enemy fire to drag the injured soldier to safety, and in the process was shot in the chest by an enemy sniper from very close range, and a split-second later, by a splinter from an RPG which hit him in the head. Batra collapsed next to the injured soldier, succumbing to the fatal wounds.

== Param Vir Chakra ==
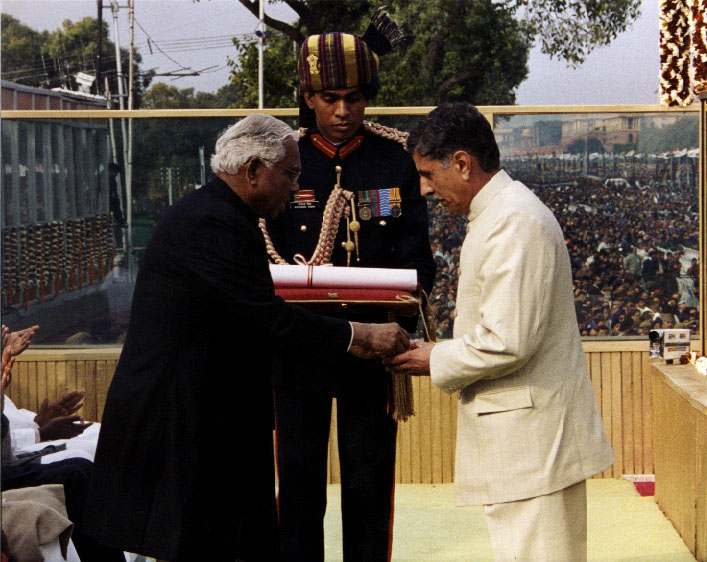
President K. R. Narayanan presenting the Param Vir Chakra (posthumous) to the father of Captain Vikram Batra, 13 Jammu and Kashmir Rifles.

Vikram Batra was awarded the Param Vir Chakra, India's highest military honour on 15 August 1999, the 52nd anniversary of India's independence. His father G.L. Batra received the honour for his deceased son from the President of India, the late K. R. Narayanan.

The Param Vir Chakra citation reads as follows:

CITATION

CAPTAIN VIKRAM BATRA

13 JAMMU AND KASHMIR RIFLES (IC 57556)

During 'Operation Vijay', on 20 June 1999, Captain Vikram Batra, Commander Delta Company was tasked to attack Point 5140. Captain Batra with his company skirted around the feature from the East and maintaining surprise reached within assaulting distance of the enemy. Captain Batra reorganised his column and motivated his men to physically assault the enemy positions. Leading from the front, he in a daredevil assault, pounced on the enemy and killed four of them in a hand-to hand fight. On 7 July 1999, in another operation in the area Pt 4875, his company was tasked to clear a narrow feature with sharp cuttings on either side and heavily fortified enemy defences that covered the only approach to it. For speedy operation, Captain Batra assaulted the enemy position along a narrow ridge and engaged the enemy in a fierce hand –to-hand fight and killed five enemy soldiers at point blank range. Despite sustaining grave injuries, he crawled towards the enemy and hurled grenades clearing the position with utter disregard to his personal safety, leading from the front, he rallied his men and pressed on the attack and achieved a near impossible military task in the face of heavy enemy fire. The officer, however, succumbed to his injuries. Inspired by his daredevil act, his troops fell upon the enemy with vengeance, annihilated them and captured Point 4875.

Captain Vikram Batra, thus, displayed the most conspicuous personal bravery and leadership of the highest order in the face of the enemy and made the supreme sacrifice in the highest traditions of the Indian Army.

— Gazette of India Notification: No. 16 – Press/2000,

== In popular culture ==
- In the 2003 Hindi film, LOC: Kargil, based on the entire Kargil conflict, Abhishek Bachchan played Batra. It was directed by J. P. Dutta.
- In the 2021 Hindi film, Shershaah, Sidharth Malhotra played Batra. It was directed by Vishnuvardhan .
- A biography graphic novel titled Capt. Vikram Batra, PVC “Ye Dil Mange Moore!” by Aditya Horizons written by Aditya Bakshi and drawn by Pradeep Yadav in 2008
- A graphic novel titled Param Vir Chakra by Amar Chitra Katha dedicated their last story written by Sanjana Kapur and drawn by Durgesh Velhal in 2015
- A biography titled Param Vir - Vikram Batra by Times Group Books written by his father G. L Batra in 2016
- A graphic novel titled Param Vir Chakra Vikram Batra by Roli Books written by Ian Cardozo and drawn by Rishi Kumar in 2019
- A biography titled The Shershah of Kargil Captain Vikram Batra, PVC by Natraj Publishers written by Deepak Surana in 2019

== Legacy ==
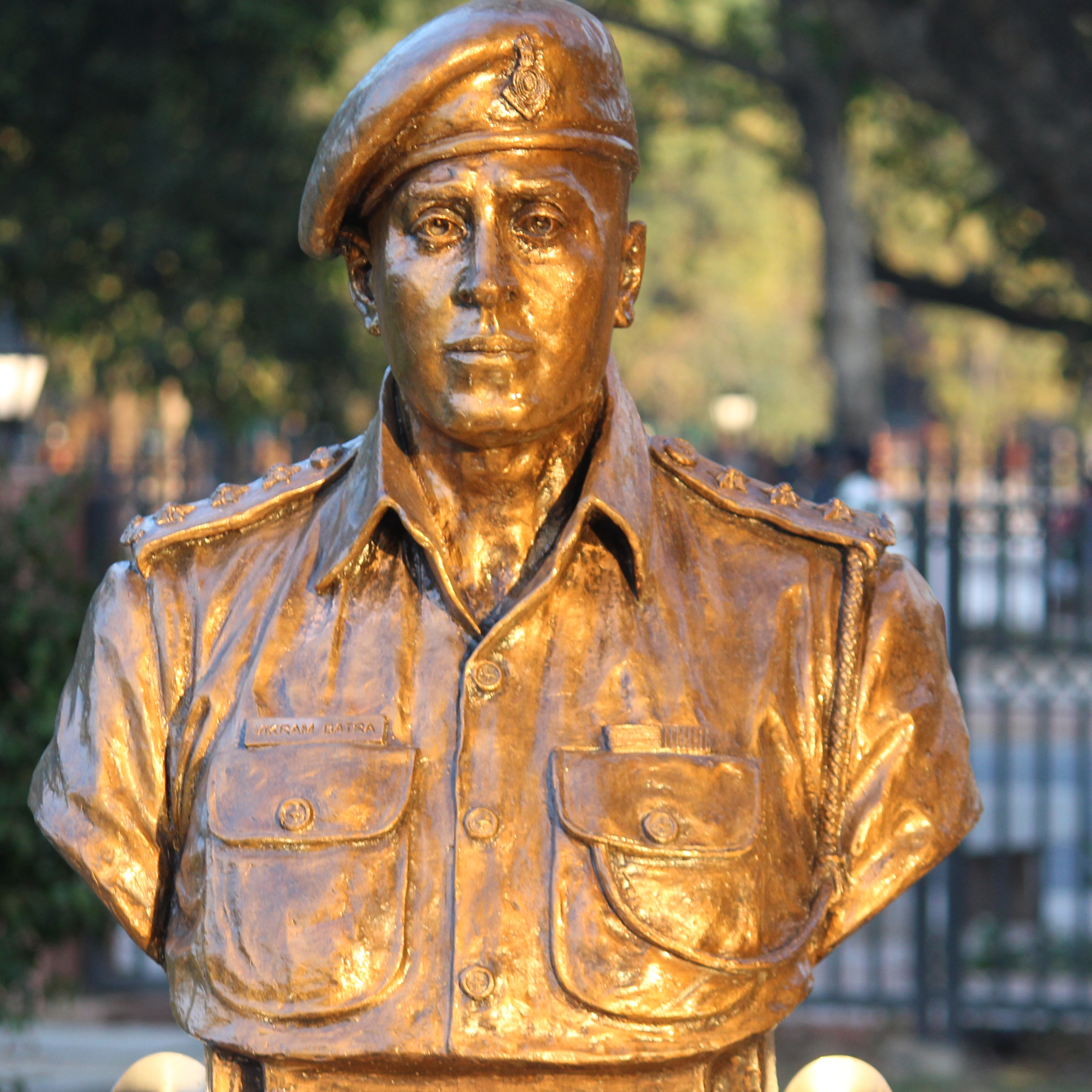
Vikram Batra's statue at Param Yodha Sthal, National War Memorial, New Delhi

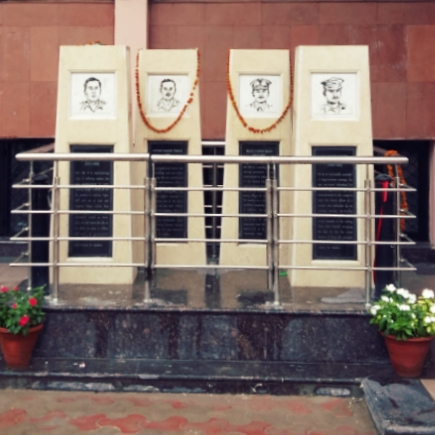
A memorial for war veterans including Batra at his alma mater DAV College, Chandigarh.

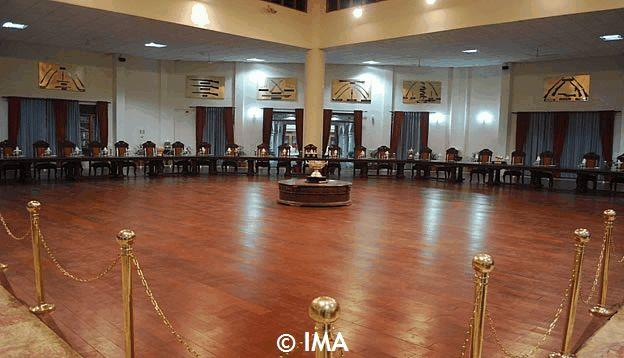
Vikram Batra Mess at the Indian Military Academy.

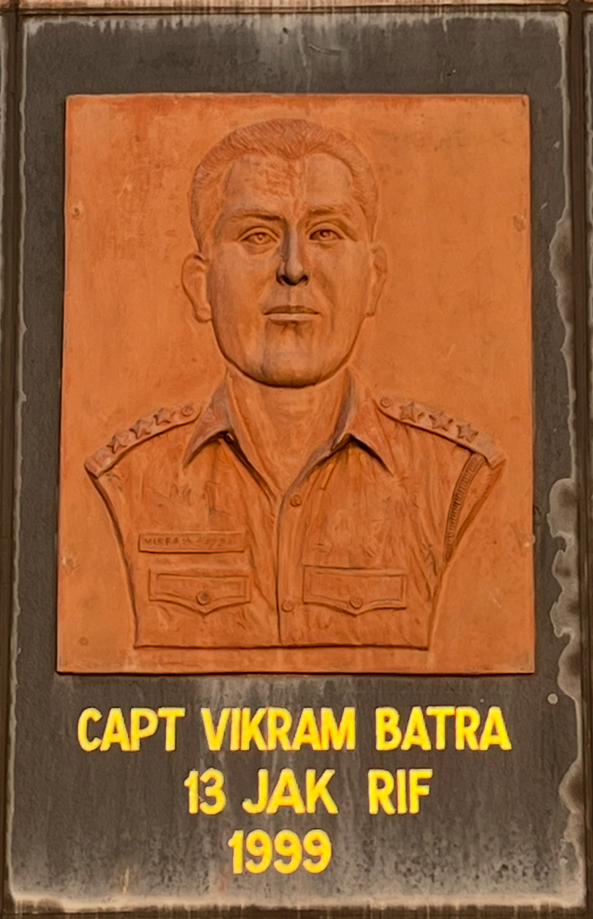
Relief of Vikram Batra at Balidan Stambh, Jammu

Vikram Batra is also well known in India for using the slogan;

"Yeh Dil Maange More"

He is also known for an interview in which he stated that Pakistani soldiers were aware of him.

He was also honoured with several landmarks being named after him: the historic capture of Point 4875 led to the mountain being named Batra Top in his honour. A hall at the Service Selection Centre Allahabad is named 'Vikram Batra Block', a residential area in the Jabalpur Cantonment is called 'Captain Vikram Batra Enclave' and the combined cadet's mess at the IMA is named 'Vikram Batra Mess'.

Balidan Stambh, the war memorial in Jammu and Kashmir (union territory) in 2009 paid tribute to him by inscribing his name on the pillars alongside the martyrs of the 13 JAK Rifles. His name is also displayed near the eternal flame, accompanied by a relief on the outside background wall with the Param Vir Chakra awardees who attained martyrdom in J&K.

A memorial for war veterans including Batra stands at his alma mater DAV College, Chandigarh honouring the services of the soldiers.

Government College Palampur was later renamed in the memory of Batra. The college is renamed as Shaheed Captain Vikram Batra Government College, Palampur.

New Delhi's Mukarba Chowk and its flyover were renamed in honour of Batra in December 2019 as "Shaheed Captain Vikram Batra Chowk".

Shaheed Captain Vikram Batra Stadium at Palampur was named after Batra.

Panjab University, Chandigarh dedicated state of the art Indoor Shooting Range in honour of Batra.

The Indian Army paid tribute to Captain Vikram Batra on the 21st anniversary of his death in a video posted on its social media account. The video featured Batra's famous words- Yeh dil maange more, and included people of all ages and from all walks of life saying "I am Vikram Batra".

To commemorate the 22 years of the sacrifice made by Batra, Army Commander Northern Command Lieutenant General Yogesh Kumar Joshi overflew the famous "Batra Top" in a Sukhoi-30 MKI and paid homage to the nation's hero from the sky. Joshi was also the then Commanding Officer of Batra.

A bust of Param Vir Chakra (PVC) Captain Vikram Batra was unveiled at Palampur military station on the eve of R.D '22

URF World Records (Universal Records Forum) certified the largest underwater portrait of Batra on the eve of Kargil Vijay Diwas 26 July 2022 at swimming pool Pangode Military Station, Thiruvananthapuram, Kerala.

On the occasion of Parakram Diwas, Indian Government announced that its naming 21 largest unnamed islands of Andaman and Nicobar after the 21 Param Vir Chakra awardees. As a Param Vir Chakra Awardee, an island is named after Vikram Batra as Batra Island.
