= Jammu and Kashmir Rifles =

Regiment of the Indian Army

- Regimental Insignia of the Jammu and Kashmir Rifles
- Active: 1821 – present
- Country: India
- Branch: Indian Army
- Type: Infantry
- Role: Infantry
- Size: 23 battalions
- Regimental Centre: Jabalpur, Madhya Pradesh
- Nickname: JAK RIF
- Mottos: Prashasta Ranveerta ("Valour in Battle is Praiseworthy")
- War Cry: Durge Mata Ki Jai ("Victory to Mother Durga")
- Decorations: See below

Commanders
- Colonel of the Regiment: Lieutenant General MP Singh, AVSM, YSM, SM
- Notable commanders: General Upendra Dwivedi; Lt Gen YK Joshi

Insignia
- Regimental Insignia: An oval embracing the Sun, the State emblem. The Sanskrit inscription around the Sun, which cannot be read on the regimental insignia above, translates as, "Ever Victorious in War"

The Jammu and Kashmir Rifles is an infantry regiment of the Indian Army. The rifles was originally the Jammu and Kashmir State Forces of the princely state of Jammu and Kashmir during reign of Hari Singh. After the accession of the state to the Indian Union in October 1947, the State Forces came under the command and oversight of the Indian Army. They remained in the original form until 1956, when Jammu and Kashmir Constituent Assembly effectively ratified the state's accession to India. This led to reorganization of the State Forces which later became Jammu and Kashmir Regiment of the Indian Army. In 1963, the designation was changed to Jammu and Kashmir Rifles leading to current status. After the conversion, the Ladakh Scouts came under the aegis of the Regiment, where it remained until raised as a separate Regiment in 2002.

== History ==
The Jammu and Kashmir Rifles Regiment traces its origin to the Dogra Kingdom of Jammu and Kashmir Maharaja Gulab Singh, the first ruler of Jammu and Kashmir raised this Force in 1820 at Jammu. The earlier exploits of the Regiment includes the annexation of the entire Hill Region of Jammu and the Kashmir Valley. General Zorawar Singh, who had joined the State Forces in 1823, assisted in expansion of the state's territory to include Ladakh, Baltistan, Tibet, Gilgit, Yasin, Darel, Hunza Nagar, Chilas and Chitral between 1834 and 1895.

=== Pre-Independence ===
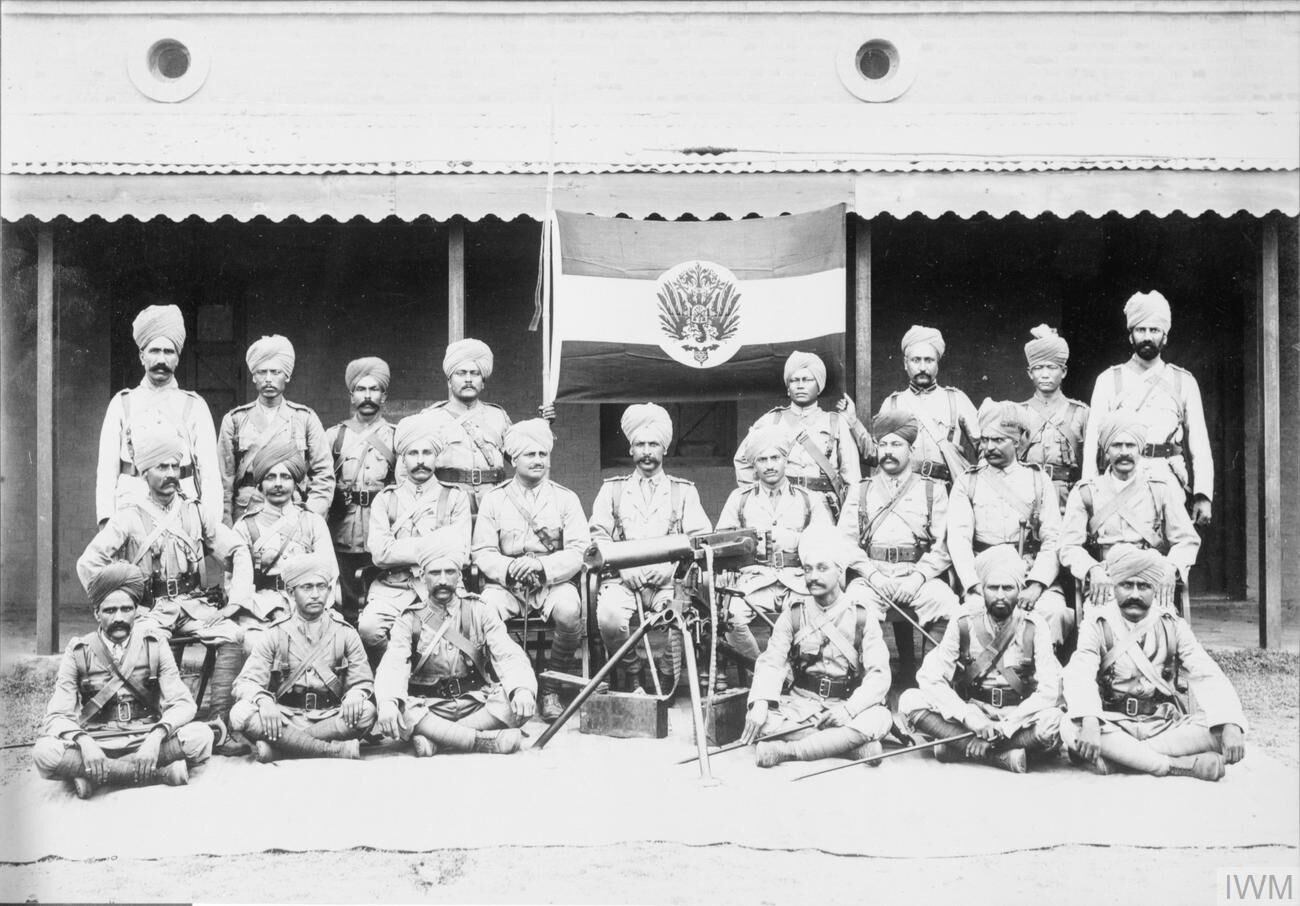
Officers of 2nd Kashmir Rifles with the German flag and machine gun captured in the Battle of Lukigura on 24 June 1916.

==== World War I ====
Maharaja Pratap Singh offered three Infantry Battalions and one Mountain Battery for service under the British during the First World War. The Regiment saw action in the East Africa, Palestine and Mesopotamia and won the Battle Honours of Megiddo, Nablus, Kilimanjaro, Behobeho, Palestine and Sharon. The Regiment was honoured with a total of 31 decorations. Following the war, the troops were welcomed on a grand scale at the Jammu Railway Station, following which the returning battalions marched through Jammu City displaying their war trophies, which included the German insignia – the Brass Eagle, the German flag and German artillery.

==== Third Afghan War ====
Immediately after the First World War, the 1st Jammu and Kashmir Mountain Battery and 1 Jammu and Kashmir Infantry participated in the Third Afghan War and were awarded 23 Meritorious Service Medals.

==== World War II ====
The Regiment saw action in Burma where 23 of its person were decorated. Two Battle Honours, Kennedy Peak and Meiktila were awarded to the Regiment.

=== Post-Independence ===
==== 1947 Jammu and Kashmir operations ====
The greatest trial of the Regiment came in the Indo-Pakistani war of 1947–1948. All nine Battalions of the Jammu and Kashmir Rifles were strung over 500 miles of the frontier, from Kathua in the South to Leh in the North. Although outnumbered and partially compromised by internal betrayal, the units resistance managed to delay the attacking force. This delay proved strategically critical, as it allowed time for the State of Jammu and Kashmir to accede to India and for Indian forces to intervene, thereby influencing the outcome of the conflict. A total of 18 Officers, 37 Junior Commissioned Officers, 1194 Other ranks and 34 Non Combatants laid their life during the war. The regiment was awarded with two Maha Vir Chakras (including the first Maha Vir Chakra of Independent India awarded to Late Brigadier Rajinder Singh), 18 Vir Chakras and 52 Mentioned in Despatches.

==== 1956 Husainiwala Operations ====
On 18 March 1956 a Pakistani force launched an attack against 4 Jammu and Kashmir Rifles, then deployed to guard Husainiwala Headworks. During the clash the enemy suffered heavy casualties and the Unit was awarded one Ashok Charka, one Kirti Chakra and one Shaurya Chakra.

==== Merger With Indian Army ====
Due to its valiant actions over the years including 1947–48 operations in Jammu and Kashmir, the Regiment was amalgamated embloc into the Indian Army on 15 January 1957 without any dilution in rank structure and came to be known as Jammu and Kashmir Regiment. In February 1963, the Regiment was redesignated as Jammu and Kashmir Rifles.

==== Indo-China War – 1962 ====
2 and 3 Jammu and Kashmir Rifles participated in 1962 war with China, wherein three Officers, 82 Other Ranks and eight Non Commissioned Employees made supreme sacrifice of their life in Bomdila Sector and the Regiment was awarded with one Mentioned-in-Despatch.

==== Indo-Pak War – 1965 ====
Seven of the eleven Battalions of the Regiment (3,4,5,6,7,8 & 9 Jammu and Kashmir Rifles) participated in 1965 war, wherein seven Officers and 167 men were killed in the line of duty. 9 Jammu and Kashmir Rifles was awarded with the Battle Honour of Asal Uttar and Theatre Honour Punjab for operations in Khem Karan Sector. Five persons of the Regiment were decorated.

==== Indo-Pak War – 1971 ====
All the 14 Battalions (1 to 14 Jammu and Kashmir Rifles) of the Regiment participated in the 1971 War both at the Eastern and Western fronts. 76 soldiers of the regiment laid their lives. 1 Jammu and Kashmir Rifles was awarded with the Battle Honour of Syam Ganj and Theatre Honour East Pakistan during the liberation of Bangladesh. 12 persons of the Regiment were awarded with gallantry medals.

==== Kargil War ====
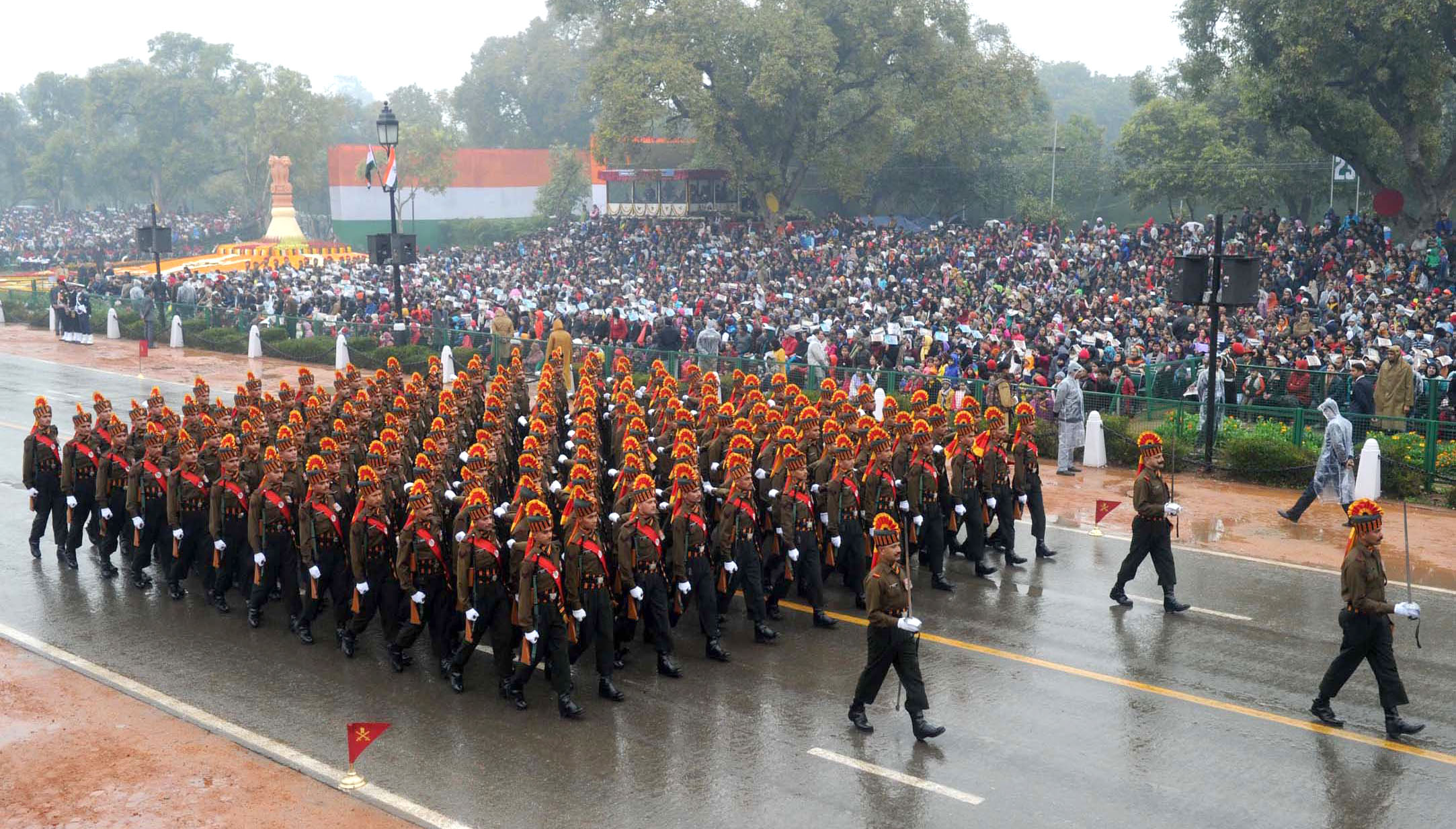
The Jammu & Kashmir Rifles contingent during the 66th Republic Day Parade, 2015

13, 14 and 19 Jammu and Kashmir Rifles, 28 Rashtriya Rifles Battalion and Ladakh Scouts took part in Operation Vijay. During the war, the regiment won 2 Param Vir Chakras, 8 Vir Chakras, 2 Yudh Seva Medals, 16 Sena Medals and 8 COAS Commendation Cards. In recognition of the exceptional account given by 13 Jammu and Kashmir Rifles in the capture of its objectives, the unit has been awarded the Battle Honours of Dras and Mushkoh, the Theatre Honour of Kargil, along with the Bravest of the brave honour.

== Class composition ==
The regiment has a class composition of 75 percentage Dogras, with the other 25 percent from Gorkhas, Sikhs and Muslims.

== Regimental Centre ==
The Jammu and Kashmir Rifles Centre is located at Jabalpur in Madhya Pradesh. The States Forces Infantry Training Battalion was located at Satwari Lines in Jammu between 1932 and 1957 (redesignated as Jammu and Kashmir Infantry Regimental Centre in 1950), and then at Morar in Gwalior before moving to its present location in Jabalpur in 1975.

== Regimental Insignia and Traditions ==
Regimental Crest

The regimental crest since 1963 features an oval encircling the radiant sun. Within the oval is the Sanskrit inscription Prashasta Ranveerta. The oval is surmounted by the national emblem of India – the Ashoka lion capital, while a scroll below bears the title ‘JAMMU & KASHMIR RIFLES’. The present crest reserves two significant elements from the former state emblem – the motto and the sun (Surya), the latter symbolic both of strength and of the Suryavanshi descent of the erstwhile ruling Dogra family of Jammu.

Uniform

The present uniform of the Jammu and Kashmir Light Infantry includes a green lanyard on the left shoulder and the shoulder title has the words JAK RIF in an arc. They traditionally wear black rank badges and buttons, as the original purpose of the rifle regiments was camouflage and concealment. The green beret (common to all infantry units in India) has the regimental crest.

Regimental motto and war cry

The motto of the regiment is Prashasta Ranveerta, which translates to "Valour in Battle is Praiseworthy". The war cry of the regiment is Durge Mata Ki Jai, which translates to "Victory to Mother Durga".

== Regimental Day ==
13 April (Zorawar Day) is celebrated as the regimental day in memory of General Zorawar Singh.

== Affiliations ==
INS Ranvir, a Rajput-class destroyer is affiliated to the Jammu & Kashmir Rifles and Ladakh Scouts of the Indian Army.

== Units ==
Battalion	Raising Date	Nickname	Remarks	References
1st Battalion	13 April 1873	Raghupartap battalion	Raised by Maharaja Ranbir Singh at Satwari Lines in Jammu. Pre independence battle honours – Hunza Nagar (1891–92), Megiddo (1914–18), Nablus (1914–18), Palestine (1914–18) and 3rd Afghan War (1919–20). Post independence battle honour Poonch and Theatre Honour of Jammu and Kashmir 1947–48.	
2nd Battalion	25 April 1869	Bodyguard battalion	Raised at Jammu. Battle honours Hunza Nagar 1891, Chilas, 1893, Kilimanjaro, Behobeho and East Africa 1918–19.	
3rd Battalion	15 April 1856	Raghunath battalion	Raised at Raghunath Mandir, Jammu. Battle honours Chitral, 1895, Megiddo, Sharon, Palestine 1918, Kilimanjaro, Behobeho and East Africa 1914–17.	
4th Battalion	1837	Fateh Shibji Paltan	Raised at Jammu by Maharaja Gulab Singh, the oldest battalion in the regiment.	
5th Battalion	13 April 1849	Suraj Gorkha	Raised by Maharaja Gulab Singh at Bahu Fort, Jammu. Re-raised at Gwalior under Lieutenant Colonel Harnam Singh MC in February 1962.	
6th Battalion	1 January 1963	Skardu battalion, Steely Sixth	Raised at Jammu on 10 November 1923, by Lieutenant General Maharaja Sir Pratap Singh Sahib Bahadur. Disbanded on 1951. Re-raised in January 1963 in Gwalior by Major Jit Singh. Lieutenant Colonel Mahel Singh took command of the unit on 17 April 1963.	
7th Battalion	9 March 1932	Lucky Seventh	Raised at Jammu by Lieutenant General Maharaja Sir Harisinghji Bahadur. Disbanded in 1945, was re-raised on 5 May 1947 by Lieutenant Colonel Devi Singh.	
8th Battalion	10 February 1940	Elite Eight	Raised at Jammu under Lieutenant Colonel Jaswant Singh as 8th Jammu and Kashmir Infantry. Battle Honour Poonch and Theatre Honour Jammu and Kashmir, 1947–48. Re-raised at Gwalior in October 1965 by Lieutenant Colonel Prem Singh.	
9th Battalion	1858, re-raised 13 March 1940	Rudra Shibnabh	Raised at Satwari, Jammu under Lieutenant Colonel Dhanatar Singh.	
10th Battalion	1 October 1964	Cho La Warriors, Tenacious Tenth	Raised at Morar Cantonment under Lieutenant Colonel Mahatam Singh.	
11th Battalion	1 January 1965	Double First	Raised at Gwalior under Lieutenant Colonel Kohar Singh.	
12nd Battalion	15 January 1966	Bahadur Balwan Barah	Raised at Morar, Gwalior under Lieutenant Colonel Sukhdev Singh.	
13th Battalion	1 October 1966	Bravest of the Brave	Has the unique honour to have won two Param Vir Chakras in a single campaign. Battle Honour Mushkoh & Drass and Theatre Honour Kargil.	
14th Battalion	1 January 1967	Fierce Fourteen		
15th Battalion	January 1976	Fighting Fifteen	Raised at Dhana, Madhya Pradesh	
16th Battalion	1 September 1976		Converted to14 Mechanised Infantry Regiment on 16 January 1981.	
17th Battalion	1 July	Striking Seventeenth		
18th Battalion	20 July 1981	Agrim Atharah		
19th Battalion	11 February 1985	Uttam Unees		
20th Battalion	1 June 1987	Towering Twenty		
21st Battalion	2015	Sarvashreshth Ikkis		
22nd Battalion		Bemisaal Baees		
23rd Battalion				
126 Infantry Battalion (TA)	27 February 1959	Raavi Terriers	Based at Madhopur, Punjab	
155 Infantry Battalion (TA)	2000	Chhattisgarh Terriers	Based at Naya Raipur, Chhattisgarh	
160 Infantry Battalion TA (H&H)	2004	Kupwara Terriers	Based at Kupwara, Jammu and Kashmir	
3 Rashtriya Rifles				
28 Rashtriya Rifles				
52 Rashtriya Rifles				

== Battle Honours ==
=== Pre-Independence ===
(i)	Ladakh	1834–40
(ii)	Baltistan	1840
(iii)	Tibet	1841
(iv)	Gilgit	1860
(v)	Yasin	1863
(vi)	Darel	1866
(vii)	Hunza Nagar	1891–92
(viii)	Chilas	1893
(ix)	Chitral	1895
(x)	East Africa 1914–17	1914–17
(xi)	East Africa 1916–18	1916–18
(xii)	Megiddo (WW – I)	1914–18
(xiii)	Beho-Beho (WW – I)	1914–18
(xiv)	Nablus (WW – I)	1914–18
(xv)	Sharon (WW – I)	1914–18
(xvi)	Kilimanjaro (WW – I)	1914–18
(xvii)	Palestine (WW – I)	1918
(xviii)	3rd Afghan War	1919–20
(xix)	Kennedy Peak (Burma Front, WW – II)	1944
(xx)	Meiktila (Burma Front, WW – II)	1945

=== Post-Independence ===
(i)	Poonch (J&K Ops)	1947–48
(ii)	Skardu (J&K Ops)	1947–48
(iii)	Jammu & Kashmir 1947–48	1947–48
(iv)	Asal Uttar (Khem Karan)	1965
(v)	Syam Ganj	1971
(vi)	Drass	1999
(vii)	Mushkoh	1999
(viii)	Kargil	1999

== Theatre Honours ==
=== Pre-Independence ===
(i)	East Africa	1914–17
(ii)	East Africa	1916–18
(iii)	Burma	1942–45

=== Post-Independence ===
(i)	1942–45	
(ii)	Jammu & Kashmir	1947–48
(iii)	Punjab	1965
(iv)	East Pakistan	1971
(v)	Kargil	1999

== Gallantry Awards ==
- Param Vir Chakra – 2
  - Captain Vikram Batra (posthumous) 13th Battalion – Kargil, 1999.
  - Rifleman Sanjay Kumar, 13th Battalion – Kargil, 1999
- Ashoka Chakra – 2
  - Second Lieutenant Cyrus Addie Pithawalla, 17th Battalion – Manipur, 1981
  - Lance Naik Sundar Singh, 4th Battalion – Jammu and Kashmir, 1956
- Padma Bhushan – 1
  - Lieutenant General Kashmir Singh Katoch MC
- Param Vishisht Seva Medal – 10
- Maha Vir Chakra – 5
  - Brigadier Rajinder Singh (posthumous), J & K State Forces – Jammu and Kashmir, 1947
  - Lieutenant Colonel Sher Jung Thapa, 6 J & K Infantry – Jammu and Kashmir, 1948
  - Lieutenant Colonel Mahatam Singh, 10th Battalion – Cho La, 1967
  - Lieutenant Colonel Surinder Kapur, 1st Battalion – Jessore, East Pakistan, 1971
  - Major Chewang Rinchen MVC, Ladakh Scouts – Jammu and Kashmir, 1971
- Kirti Chakra – 11
  - Naik Mukhtiar Singh, (posthumous), 4 J & K Infantry – Punjab, 1956
  - Second Lieutenant Raj Mohan Sharma, 7 J & K Infantry – Naga Hills, 1959
  - Rifleman Hans Raj, (posthumous), 3 J & K Regiment – Naga Hills, 1961
  - Rifleman Parshotam Dass, (posthumous), Jammu and Kashmir, 1981
  - Lieutenant Colonel Rama Prasad Sing, Manipur, 1982
  - Lance Naik Ravi Singh, Manipur, 1982
  - Major Ajay Nath Bahuguna, (posthumous), Jammu and Kashmir, 1984
  - Captain Anoop Kumar Chandhok, Jammu and Kashmir, 1985
  - Naib Subedar Baldev Raj, 17th Battalion – Jammu and Kashmir, 1994
  - Subedar Rewel Singh, 4th Battalion – Cambodia, 1994
  - Lance Havildar Nek Singh SC, (posthumous), 2nd Battalion, Jammu and Kashmir, 1995
- Uttam Yudh Seva Medal – 3
- Ati Vishisht Seva Medal – 21
- Bar to Ati Vishisht Seva Medal – 3
- Vir Chakra – 44
- Shaurya Chakra – 49
- Yudh Seva Medal – 17
- Sena Medal – 336
- Bar to Sena Medal – 4
- Vishisht Seva Medal – 68
- Bar to Vishisht Seva Medal – 2
- CDS Commendation Card – 7
- Mentioned-in-Despatches – 85
- COAS Commendation Card – 749
- VCOAS Commendation Card – 100
- Army Commander's Commendation Card – 889
- CISC Commendation Card – 4

== Notable Commanders ==
- Lieutenant General Kashmir Singh Katoch – Vice Chief of the Army Staff 1966–1970.
- Lieutenant General B S Jaswal – General Officer Commanding-in-Chief of Army Training Command in 2009 and General Officer Commanding-in-Chief of Northern Command 2009–2010.
- Lieutenant General Yogesh Kumar Joshi – General Officer Commanding-in-Chief of Northern Command 2020–2022.
- General Upendra Dwivedi – Chief of the Army Staff from 2024-26.

== Unit Citations / Appreciations of Chief of Army Staff (Indian Army) ==
(i)	1 JAK RIF	2006
(ii)	2 JAK RIF	1993
(iii)	3 JAK RIF	2015
(iv)	4 JAK RIF	1993 & 2021
(v)	6 JAK RIF	1992
(vi)	9 JAK RIF	2026
(vii)	10 JAK RIF	1992
(viii)	12 JAK RIF	2006
(ix)	13 JAK RIF	1999 (Bravest of the Brave)
(x)	14 JAK RIF	2022
(xi)	15 JAK RIF	2004 & 2010
(xii)	17 JAK RIF	1994
(xiii)	19 JAK RIF	2006
(xiv)	20 JAK RIF	2008
(xv)	3 RR Bn (JAK RIF)	1995, 2020 & 2022
(xvi)	28 RR Bn (JAK RIF)	1999 & 2016
(xvii)	52 RR Bn (JAK RIF)	2011

== United Nation Force Commander's Unit Citation ==
(i)	1 JAK RIF	2008
(ii)	4 JAK RIF	1993
(iii)	6 JAK RIF	2017

== See also ==
- Jammu and Kashmir Light Infantry
- List of regiments of the Indian Army
- Azad Kashmir Regiment

== Notes ==
- Rawat, Rachna Bisht (2014). The Brave: Param Vir Chakra Stories. Penguin Books India Private Limited. ISBN 9780143422358.
- Singh, K. Brahma (1990), History of Jammu and Kashmir Rifles, 1820-1956: The State Force Background, Lancer International, ISBN 978-81-7062-091-4
