= Sher Shah Bridge =

Flyover in Karachi, Pakistan

Sher Shah Bridge is an overpass in Karachi, Pakistan. In September 2007, the bridge collapsed, leaving five men crushed as a result.

The Sher Shah neighbourhood and Sher Shah Bridge in Kiamari Town of Karachi and Sher Shah Park in Wah Cantt, Pakistan, are named after Sher Shah Suri.

== Collapse case ==
Court took charges against the officials of National Highway Authority.
