= Yeh Dil Maange More! =

Slogan for Pepsi

Yeh Dil Maange More! is an advertising slogan coined for Pepsi at JWT by Anuja Chauhan in 1998. It combines Hindi and English, literally meaning This Heart Desires More, which later became a popular slogan. The slogan and its derivatives have been used in multiple contexts in India. The worldwide Pepsi commercial featuring the song, Ask for More, written by Janet Jackson was released in November 2007, later released a single in January 2008.

== History ==
The slogan has its origins as a commercial slogan for Pepsi advertisement in 1998, at JWT by Anuja Chauhan who eventually became vice president and Executive Creative Director at JWT, Delhi, and author of books like, The Zoya Factor (2008). Thereafter it soon gained mass popularity, and became a battle slogan and rallying cry, first used by Capt. Vikram Batra, an officer of the Indian Army, during the 1999 Kargil War and widely reported in the media. Captain Batra was martyred in the war in July 1999, and was posthumously awarded the Param Vir Chakra, India's highest military honour. The slogan continues to be a part of the Indian popular culture.

In 2004, it was used as a title for a Bollywood movie, Dil Maange More starring Shahid Kapoor.

In March 2024 this tagline was returned after unviell of Pepsi New Identity in India.

== Pepsi advertisement ==
The slogan was coined as a tagline for a Pepsi television advertisement series that first ran in December 1998 and sought to establish Pepsi as a strong brand with Indian youth. It was a continuation of Pepsi's advertising campaign in the mid-to-late nineties, which it had initially launched as an ambush marketing effort against Coca-Cola during the 1996 Cricket World Cup. The ads featured prominent sports personalities and film stars, such as Sachin Tendulkar, Shahrukh Khan, Amitabh Bachchan, and Pawan Kalyan and were directed by Prahlad Kakkar, a veteran ad film director. The catchphrase became a runaway success and other business entities sought to appropriate it in their messaging. Pepsi litigated actively to assert an exclusive right to use the slogan.

== See also ==
- Vikram Batra
- Pawan Kalyan
- Kargil War
- Dil Maange More
- Hinglish
