= Shaitan Singh =

Indian military officer and Param Vir Chakra recipient (1924–1962)

Major Shaitan Singh Bhati PVC
- Portrait of Shaitan Singh Bhati
- Born: 1 December 1924; Banasar, Jodhpur State, Rajputana, British India (present day: Shaitan Singh Nagar, Jodhpur district, Rajasthan)
- Died: 18 November 1962 (aged 37); Rezang La, Union Territory of Ladakh, India
- Spouse: Shagun Kanwar
- Children: 1
- Military career
- Allegiance: Kingdom of Marwar; Republic of India
- Branch: Indian Army
- Service years: 1949–1962
- Rank: Major
- Service number: IC-6400
- Unit: 13 Kumaon
- Conflicts: Ethnic conflict in Nagaland; 1961 Indian annexation of Goa; Sino-Indian War; Battle of Rezang La †
- Awards: Param Vir Chakra

Major Shaitan Singh Bhati, PVC (1 December 1924 – 18 November 1962) was an officer in the Indian Army and a posthumous recipient of the Param Vir Chakra, India's highest military decoration for valour. Born in Jodhpur State Singh joined the Indian army in 1949 and by 1962 had reached the rank of major. During the Battle of Rezang La in the 1962 Sino-Indian War, he commanded a company of the 13 Kumaon Regiment against a significantly larger Chinese force in Ladakh. Despite being outnumbered and under heavy fire, he moved between posts to organise the defence. For his actions, he was awarded the Param Vir Chakra posthumously.

== Early life and education ==
Shaitan Singh Bhati was born on 1 December 1924 into a Rajput family of the Bhati clan in Banasar village, Jodhpur state, Rajputana. His father was Lieutenant Colonel Thakur Hem Singh Bhati. Lt. Col. Singh served in France with the Indian Army during World War I, and was awarded the Order of the British Empire (OBE) by the British government.

Singh studied in the Chopasni Senior Secondary School, Jodhpur up to his matriculation. At school, he was known for his skills as a football player. After completing his schooling in 1943, Singh went to Jaswant College, and completed his graduation in 1947.

== Military career ==
On 1 August 1949, he joined the Jodhpur State Forces as an officer. After the princely state of Jodhpur was merged into India, Shaitan Singh Bhati was transferred to the Kumaon Regiment. He was promoted to captain on 25 November 1955, and took part in operations in Naga Hills and also in 1961 Indian annexation of Goa. On 11 June 1962, he was promoted to the rank of major.

=== 1962 Sino-Indian War ===
There had long been disagreement between India and China over borders in the Himalaya region. To counter the increasing Chinese intrusions into disputed territory, then Prime Minister of India Jawaharlal Nehru asked for strategies for dealing with them. However, the proposal put forward by the Indian Army was rejected. Instead, he approved a plan proposed by a bureaucrat called the "Forward Policy". This called for the establishment of a number of small posts facing the Chinese. Due to the severe rise in public criticism against Chinese intrusions, The PM of India(Jawaharlal Nehru) implemented the "Forward Policy" against the advice of the army. The army's concern was that the Chinese had geographical advantage. Additionally, maintaining numerous small posts would be untenable if the Chinese superior forces attacked. This was ruled out by Jawaharlal Nehru who believed the Chinese would not attack. But the Chinese did, initiating Sino-Indian war in 1962.

=== Battle of Rezang La ===
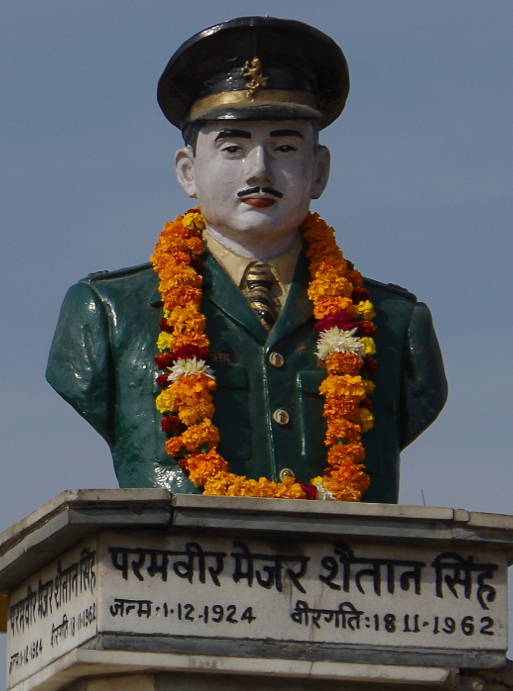
Statue of Shaitan Singh in a central square of his native city of Jodhpur, Rajasthan, India

During the war, the 13th Battalion of Kumaon Regiment, Charlie ‘C’ company comprising 120 soldiers was positioned in Chusul sector, at a height of 5,000 metres (16,000 ft) above sea level, the battalion under the command of Singh was holding a position at Rezang La, and the area was defended by five platoon posts. In the morning hours of 18 November 1962, the Chinese attacked. Indians prepared for an offensive as they saw the Chinese advancing through nullahs (Note: A nullah or a nulla (Urdu: نلہ or "nallah" in Punjabi) is an 'arm of the sea', stream, or watercourse, a steep narrow valley.) in the dim dawn lighting. At 5:00 am, as platoons got a better sight of the Chinese, they started firing with light machine guns, rifles, mortar, and grenades, killing many Chinese soldiers.

At 5:40 am, the Indians were fired upon by artillery and mortar. Again, around three hundred and fifty Chinese soldiers started to advance through nullahs. No. 9 Platoon held fire until the Chinese were as close as 90 metres (300 ft), and inflicted heavy casualties. As attacks from the vanguard were unsuccessful, around four hundred Chinese troops attacked from the rear. Simultaneously, No. 8 Platoon was fired upon with medium machine guns from the wire fencing of the post, and also received artillery and mortar fire. No. 7 Platoon was attacked by one hundred and twenty Chinese soldiers from the rear. The Indians countered with 3-inch (76 mm) mortar shells and killed many Chinese soldiers. As the last twenty survivors charged towards the post, the Indians jumped out of their trenches and engaged in hand-to-hand combat with the Chinese soldiers. However, the Platoon was soon encircled with the arrival of Chinese reinforcements. Eventually, No. 7 & 8 platoons were left with no survivors.

During the battle, Singh continuously moved from post to post reorganising the defenses and boosting the morale of his men. As he moved between the posts without any cover, he was seriously wounded. While he was being evacuated by his soldiers, the Chinese started to fire heavily on them. Sensing the danger, Singh ordered the soldiers to leave. They placed him behind a boulder, where he succumbed to his injuries. In the battle, the Indian side suffered 114 casualties out of 124, whereas the Chinese side had a casualty of more than 3000 personnel. (Note: According to the report by Indiatimes, the Indian troops suffered 114 casualties out of a 120-man force.) Singh's body was found at the same boulder. It was brought to Jodhpur and cremated with military honours.

=== Param Vir Chakra ===
For his actions at the Battle of Rezang La, on 18 November 1962, Singh was awarded the Param Vir Chakra. The official citation read:

Major Shaitan Singh was commanding a company of an infantry battalion deployed at Rezang La in the Chusul sector at a height of about 16,000 feet. The locality was isolated from the main defended sector and consisted of five platoon-defended position. On 18 November 1962, the Chinese forces subjected the company position to heavy artillery, mortar and small arms fire and attacked it in overwhelming strength in several successive waves. Against heavy odds, our troops beat back successive waves of enemy attack. During the action, Major Shaitan Singh dominated the scene of operations and moved at great personal risk from one platoon post to another sustaining the morale of his hard-pressed platoon posts. While doing so he was seriously wounded but continued to encourage and lead his men, who, following his brave example fought gallantly and inflicted heavy casualties on the enemy. For every man lost to us, the enemy lost four or five. When Major Shaitan Singh fell disabled by wounds in his arms and abdomen, his men tried to evacuate him but they came under heavy machine-gun fire. Major Shaitan Singh then ordered his men to leave him to his fate in order to save their lives. Major Shaitan Singh's supreme courage, leadership and exemplary devotion to duty inspired his company to fight almost to the last man.

— Gazette of India Notification No.68—Press/62, (Cardozo 2003, p. 83)

== Posthumous legal case ==
As of 2021, Singh's family were involved in a legal battle over his pension. Between his death on November 18, 1962 and 1972, his wife received a "normal family pension" of 30% of his salary, despite being entitled to 60%. A family gratuity of ₹4,000 paid in 1963 was recovered by government from her pension in 1964. The government introduced a "liberalised family pension" scheme in 1972, but Singh's wife did not begin receiving this until 1996. The family claims the arrears from 1972 to 1995, as well as an unpaid ₹9,500 gratuity from the same period. Singh's wife died in 2015 and, As of 2021, the case was being pursued in the Armed Forces Tribunal by Singh's son.

== Legacy ==
=== Entities named after him ===
- Shaitan Singh Dweep island: On the occasion of Parakram Diwas on 23 January, 2023, 21 Islands of Andaman and Nicobar were named after 21 PVC awardees, one of the 21 Islands was named after Major Shaitan Singh.
- Shaitan Singh Nagar : Formerly known as Banasar, is a village in Jodhpur district, Rajasthan, India, which was the native village of Major Shaitan Singh and was renamed in his honor after residents petitioned the government.
- Shaitan Singh Nagar Railway station on Jodhpur–Jaisalmer line: The railway station of the village in Rajasthan was also renamed as Shaitan Singh Nagar Railway station near Jodhpur.
- Shaitan Singh Colony in Jaipur: Rajasthan Government named a colony in Jaipur after Singh.
- Major Shaitan Singh, PVC tankers: In 1980s, the Shipping Corporation of India (SCI), a Government of India enterprise under the aegis of the Ministry of Shipping, named fifteen of its crude oil tankers in honour of the PVC recipients. The tanker MT Major Shaitan Singh, PVC was delivered to SCI in 1985, and served for 25 years before being phased out.

=== Memorials ===
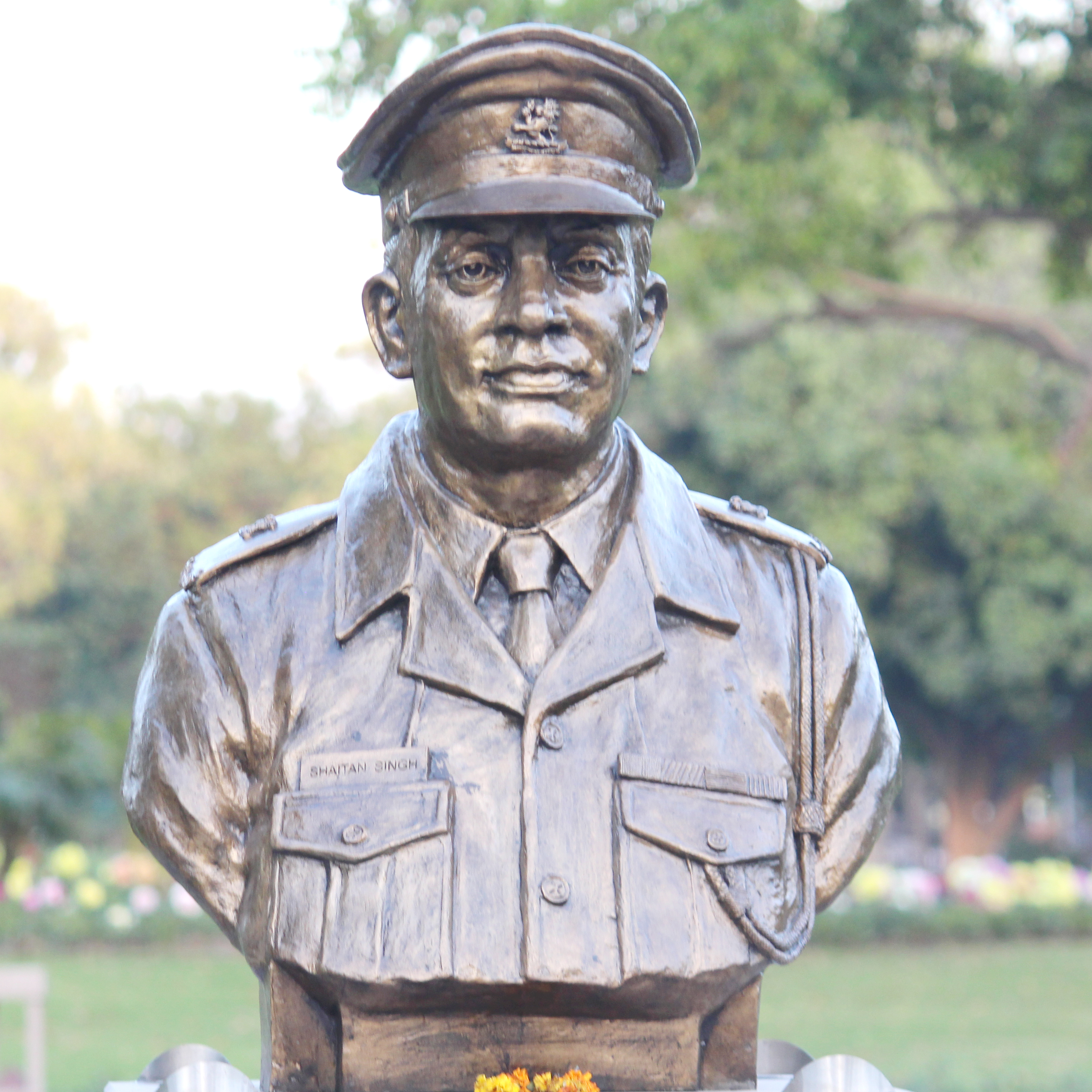
Singh's statue at Param Yodha Sthal, National War Memorial, New Delhi.

National War Memorial's Param Yodha Sthal, a dedicated area within the memorial complex which honors Param Vir Chakra awardees, India's highest wartime gallantry award, and includes a bust and a bronze relief of each of 21 recipients, has Shaitan Singh's bust and a bronze relief.

Chushul War Memorial at Chushul town itself: is a war memorial dedicated to Major Shaitan Singh's company in the Chushul plains. It was renovated and rededicated by Defence Minister Rajnath Singh on 18 November 2021. The upgraded complex includes a museum and mini-theatre.

Rezang La War Memorial at Tsaga village: 12 km south of Chushul.

Rezang La War Memorial at Rezang La (demolished): However, a smaller memorial at the exact site where Major Singh's body was found was reportedly dismantled in late 2023. This was done in the aftermath of 2020–2021 China–India skirmishes to create a buffer zone along the Line of Actual Control (LAC) as part of a disengagement agreement with China, a move which drew criticism. The larger, renovated memorial at Chushul renovated by Rajnath Singh remains intact.

A square in Jodhpur city commemorates him with his statue.

=== Inscriptions ===
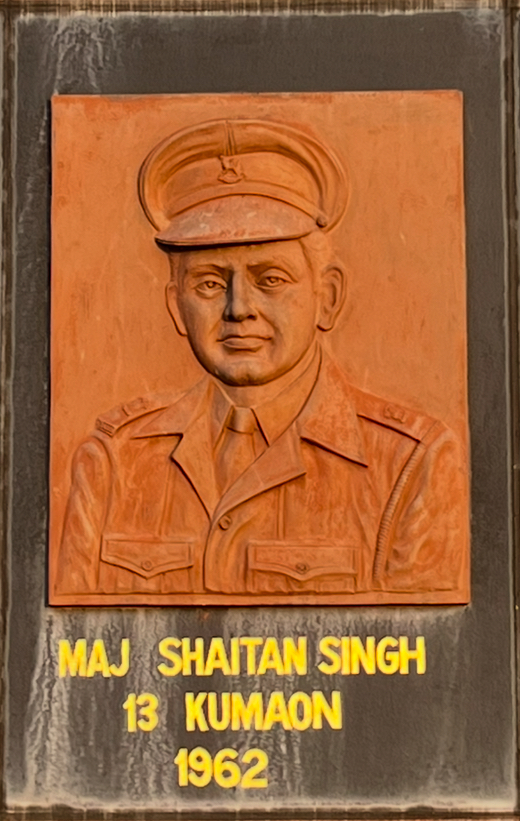
Relief Mural at Balidan Stambh Jammu.

Amar Jawan Jyoti (Eternal Flame), near India Gate and adjacent to the National War Memorial, has his name inscribed among the martyred war heroes.

Balidan Stambh, the war memorial in Jammu, Jammu and Kashmir (union territory) in 2009 paid tribute to him by inscribing his name on the pillars erected in semi circumference for the martyrs of the 1962 war.

== In popular culture ==
=== Books ===
- Param Vir Chakra by Amar Chitra Katha (2015): a graphic novel by Amar Chitra Katha dedicated their 9th story to Shaitan Singh written by Aparna Kapur and drawn by Sundarlal.
- Param Vir Chakra Shaitan Singh (2019): a graphic novel by Roli Books written by Ian Cardozo and drawn by Rishi Kumar.
- Major Shaitan Singh, PVC: The Man In Half Light (2023): a complete biography by Jai Samota.

=== Television ===
- Param Vir Chakra TV Series episode on Shaitan Singh (1988): Pankaj Dheer played the role of Shaitan Singh in an episode which was aired on DD National.
- 1962: The War in the Hills (2021): a Hindi-language war drama television series based on Rezang La war, featuring Abhay Deol, is available on Disney+ Hotstar.

=== Films ===
- PVC Major Shaitan Singh, a 2017 film starring Shehzad Khan as Shaitan Singh was directed by Pankaj Sehgal.
- 120 Bahadur (2025), Farhan Akhtar plays the role of Maj Shaitan Singh.

== Notes ==
Footnotes

Citations
