= Balidan Stambh =

Memorial pillar in Jammu and Kashmir, India

Balidan Stambh (Hindi: बलिदान स्तंभ "sacrificial pillar") is a memorial situated in Jammu in the Indian state of Jammu and Kashmir. It was constructed to commemorate the heroic deeds of the soldiers and policemen who died in the fight to protect the sovereignty of the frontiers and during the ongoing Insurgency in Jammu and Kashmir. The country's first of its kind was built by the Indian Army at the cost of Rupees 130 million in 2009. It is sixty meters high in the shape of a soldier's gun. The names of 4877 martyrs are inscribed on 52 pillars around the country. Some of the pillars are dedicated to 543 soldiers who were martyred in the Kargil War. Of these martyrs, 71 were from different districts of Jammu and Kashmir. Later, the personnel from the military, paramilitary and police who died during the ongoing militancy in Jammu & Kashmir, numbering 15,000 were honored in the memorial.

== Architecture ==
The pillar is shaped like a bayoneted rifle. The height of the pillar is approximately 60 metres from the base with the sun rays filtering through its baffles. At the base is an eternal flame. The martyr's flame is placed within the butt of the rifle. The design of the memorial revolves around a 5.56 mm INSAS rifle. At the entrance, 6-metre-tall (20 ft) INSAS bullets are erected on both sides. The memorial is exclusively dedicated to the soldiers martyred during wars and counter-insurgency operations within Jammu and Kashmir region. It encompasses the Indo-Pakistani War of 1947-1948, Sino-Indian War of 1962, Indo-Pakistani War of 1965, Indo-Pakistani War of 1971, Kargil War of 1999 wars and the anti-militancy operations since 1990. These names are inscribed on pillars built around the circumference of the memorial as also on the walls around the Amar Jawan Jyoti. One half of the circumference has the Murals of Param Vir Chakra and Ashok Chakra awardees.

== Tributes ==
The war memorial in Jammu, Jammu and Kashmir (union territory) in 2009 paid tribute to 9 Param Vir Chakra, Maha Vir Chakra and Vir Chakra awardees who attained martyrdom in J&K by inscribing their names on the pillars alongside other fallen comrades of the 1947-1948, 1962, 1965, 1971 and 1999 wars in semi circumference. Their names are also displayed near the amar jawan jyoti (Eternal Flame) in the center. Relief murals honoring the martyrs of the Param Vir Chakra and Ashok Chakra are displayed on a semi-circular wall. List of Martyrs in Jammu and Kashmir (union territory)

=== Param Vir Chakra ===
Here is a complete list of Param Vir Chakra (PVC) awardees martyred in Jammu and Kashmir:

- 1. Major Somnath Sharma (1947–48)

First PVC recipient for defending Srinagar Battle of Badgam

- 2. Naik Jadunath Singh (1947–48)

Defended Taindhar ridge in Naushera sector.

- 3. Company Havildar Major Piru Singh (1947–48)

Fought heroically in the Battle of Tithwal.

- 4. Major Shaitan Singh (1962)

Fought the Battle of Rezang La

- 5. Lieutenant Colonel Ardeshir Burzorji Tarapore (1965)

Fought the Battle of Chawinda.

- 6. Flying Officer Nirmal Jit Singh Sekhon (1971)

Fought Air War of Srinagar

- 7. Second Lieutenant Arun Kheterpal (1971)

Fought the Battle of Basantar

- 8. Lieutenant Manoj Pandey (1999)

Fought the Battle of Khaluber.

- 9. Captain Vikram Batra (1999)

Known as the "Sher Shah" of Kargil, martyred during the capture of Point 4875 in Kargil war.

== Ashok Chakra ==
- Navdeep Singh
- Arun Jasrotia
