= Shaitan Singh Nagar =

Village in Jodhpur district, Rajasthan, India

- Village
- Town: India
- State: Rajasthan
- District: Jodhpur
- Elevation: 230 m (750 ft)

Population (2001)
  - Total: 3,947

Languages
- Time zone: UTC+5:30 (IST)
- PIN: 342023
- ISO 3166 code: RJ-IN
- Vehicle registration: RJ-19

Shaitan Singh Nagar (formerly known as Banasar) is a village in Jodhpur district, Rajasthan, India. The village was renamed in honor of Major Shaitan Singh, a recipient of India's highest military decoration, the Param Vir Chakra, awarded posthumously for his valor during the 1962 Sino-Indian War.

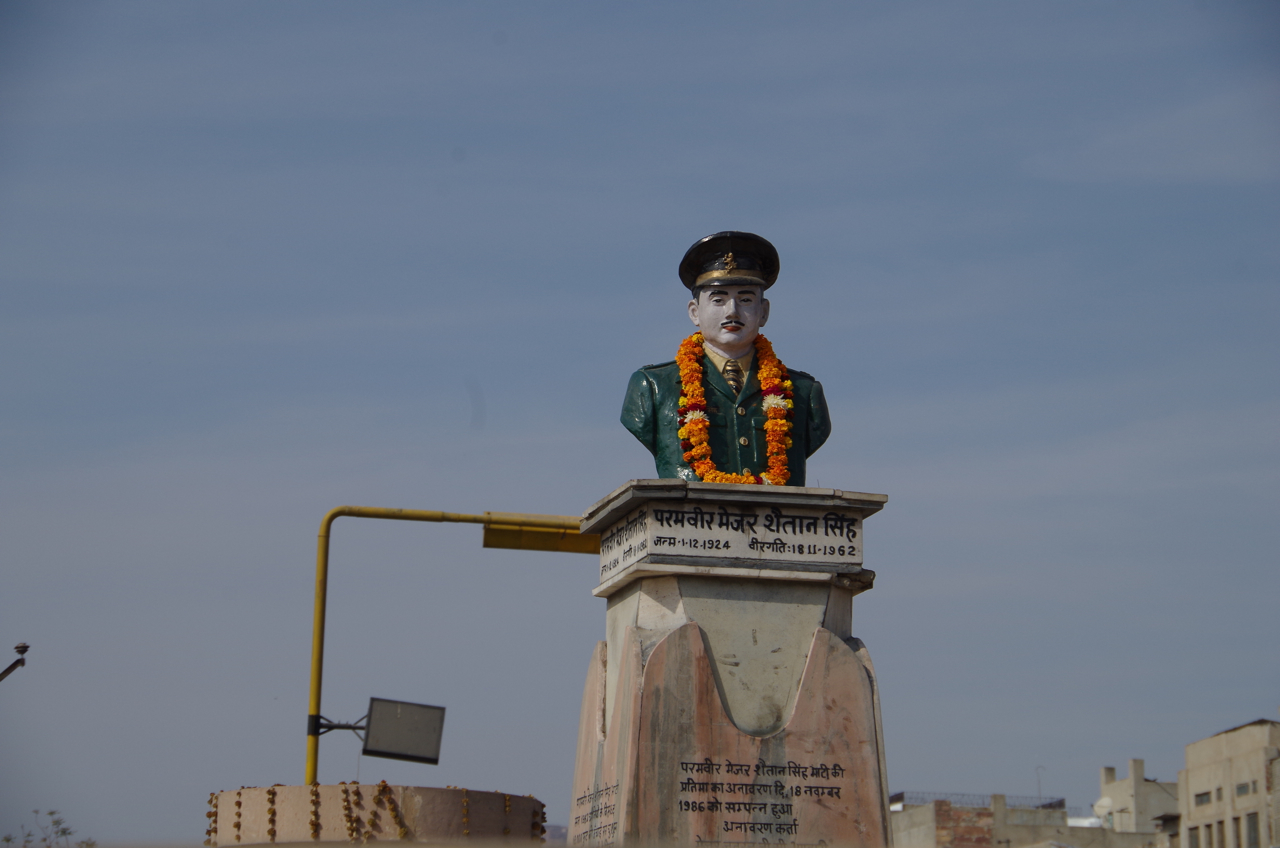
Singh's statue at a square in Jodhpur city.

== Demographics ==
According to the 2011 Population Census, Shaitan Singh Nagar has a total population of 3947 residents, with 2087 males and 1860 females living in 650 families.

== Namesake ==
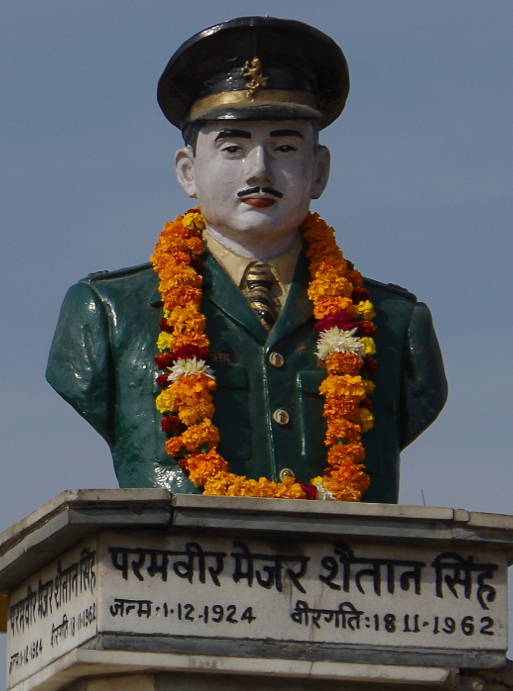
Statue of Shaitan Singh in a central square of his native city of Jodhpur, Rajasthan, Indi

Major Shaitan Singh Bhati, PVC was an Indian Army officer and recipient of India's highest military decoration, the Param Vir Chakra. Singh was born in Rajasthan. On completing his graduation, Singh joined the Jodhpur State Forces.
