= Sino-Indian War =

1962 war between China and India

Sino–Indian War
- Part of Sino-Indian border dispute
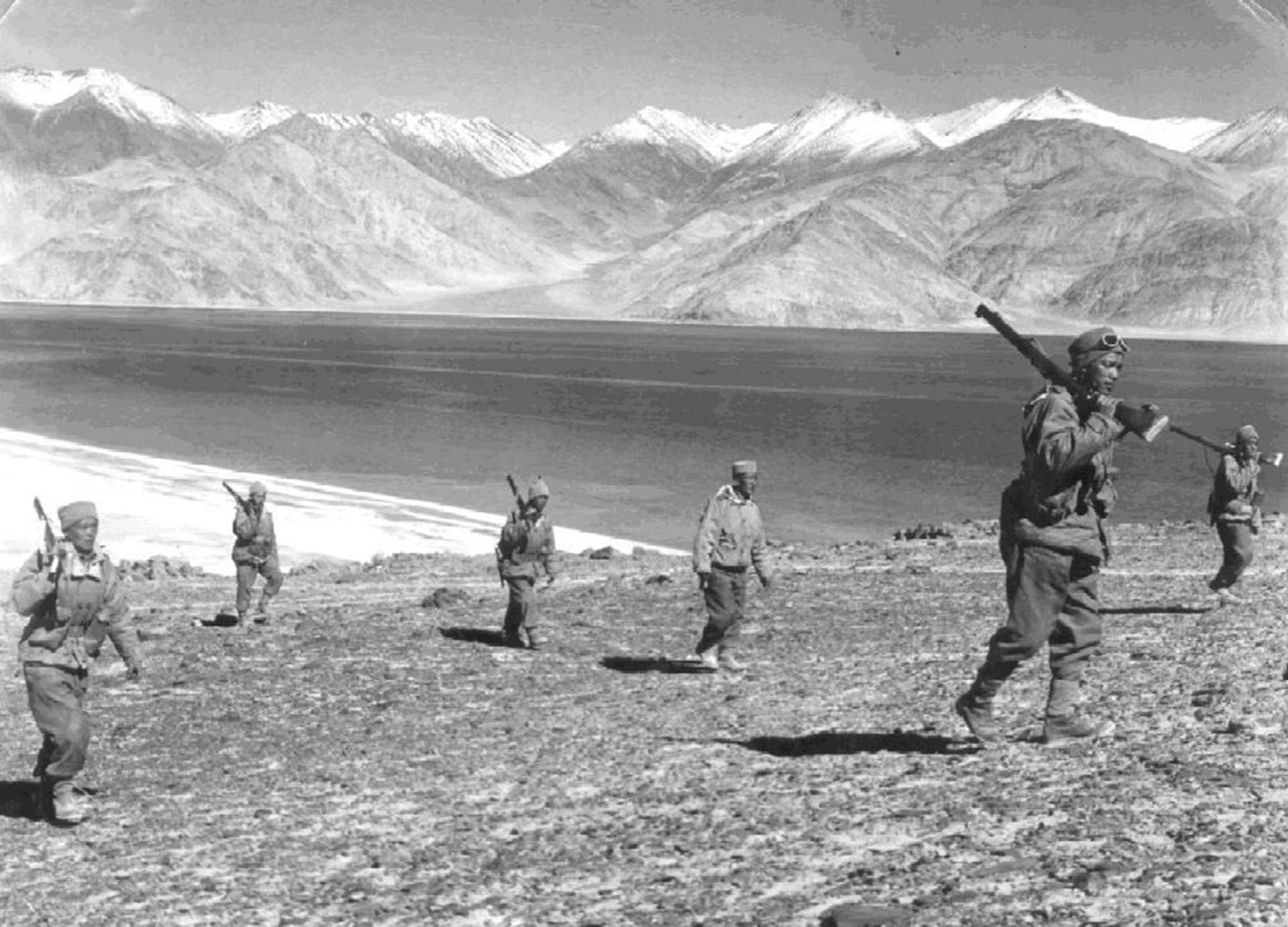
- Indian soldiers patrolling Spanggur Tso at the Sino–Indian border in January 1962
Date	20 October – 21 November 1962 (1 month and 1 day)
Location	Aksai Chin, North-East Frontier Agency, and Assam
Result	Chinese victory
Territorial changes	Status quo ante bellum

Belligerents
China	India

Commanders and leaders
Mao Zedong; Zhou Enlai	Jawaharlal Nehru; V. K. Krishna Menon; Brij Mohan Kaul

Strength
80,000	22,000

Casualties and losses
Chinese figures: 722 killed; 1,697 wounded; Indian claims: 1,300 killed (in Rezang La)	Indian figures: 1,383 killed; 1,696 missing; 548–1,047 wounded; 3,968 captured; Chinese sources: 4,897 killed or wounded; 3,968 captured

The Sino-Indian War, also known as the China–India War or the Indo-China War, was an armed conflict between China and India that took place from October to November 1962. It was a military escalation of the Sino-Indian border dispute. The fighting was concentrated in two locations along the India-China border, the North-East Frontier Agency (NESA), and the Aksai Chin region, which were roughly 1,000 km (620 mi) apart. The conflict arose due to China's claims over the Aksai Chin and NESA, with both countries relying on different historical border agreements. India recognised the Johnson Line in the west and the McMahon Line in the east, while China did not recognise them.

A series of border skirmishes arose between the two countries after the 1959 Tibetan uprising, when India granted asylum to the 14th Dalai Lama. The border dispute was not resolved through bilateral talks, and China's construction of a strategic road through Aksai Chin further escalated the dispute. Chinese military action grew increasingly aggressive after India rejected proposed Chinese diplomatic settlements throughout 1960–1962, with China resuming previously banned "forward patrols" in Ladakh after 30 April 1962. In September–October 1962, tensions escalated at Dhola Post and Thagla Ridge on the eastern front, where India interpreted the McMahon Line to run along the ridge, while China rejected this claim. A series of clashes ended with Chinese forces gaining the advantage, and by 18 October, China had amassed a large number of troops for a major offensive.

China abandoned all attempts towards a peaceful resolution on 20 October 1962, and launched simultaneous offensives in NESA (eastern front) and Aksai Chin (western front). The Chinese forces overran the Indian Army positions at Namka Chu and Tawang in the eastern front, and Chip Chap Valley and Pangong Lake in the western front, after a heavy fighting and forced the Indian troops to withdraw. After a three week lull period, China resumed its offensive on 14 November 1962, and captured key positions at Se La, Bomdila, and Gurung Hill on the eastern front. In the western front, the fierce battles of Rezang La and Gurung Hill resulted in heavy casualties on both sides. The conflict ended when China unilaterally declared a ceasefire on 20 November 1962 and simultaneously announced its withdrawal to its pre-war position, the effective China–India border.

Much of the fighting consisted of mountain warfare, entailing large-scale combat at altitudes of over 5,000 m (16,000 ft). The war took place entirely on land, without the use of naval or air assets, and neither side officially declared a war, or broke off diplomatic relations. The conflict was viewed as a major military and political setback in India. In response, India rapidly modernised and expanded its armed forces, and strengthened border defences. India reassessed its policy towards China, and the conflict permanently damaged the Sino-Indian relations. As the Sino-Soviet split deepened, the Soviet Union supported India with the sale of military hardware, while India were also compelled to turn to the Soviets for military aid as the United States and the United Kingdom refused to sell them advanced weaponry.

== Location ==
China and India shared a long border. India claimed a 3,488 km (2,167 mi)-long border, while China claimed a shorter border. A number of disputed regions lie along this border. At its western end is the Aksai Chin region, roughly spread across 38,000 km^{2} (15,000 sq mi), which was claimed by China, while India considered it as part of Ladakh. At its eastern end, China claimed the North East Frontier Agency (NESA), roughly spread across 90,000 km^{2} (35,000 sq mi), which was administered by India.

The border consisted of mountainous terrain at high elevations. The Aksai Chin region is a cold desert located at an average altitude of 5,000 m (16,000 ft), while NESA consisted of hilly terrain with several peaks exceeding 5,000 m (16,000 ft). The conflict happened in high altitude and freezing conditions, which caused logistic and welfare difficulties for the fighting armies. The harsh conditions also resulted in several casualties, with many troops on both sides succumbing to the cold temperatures.

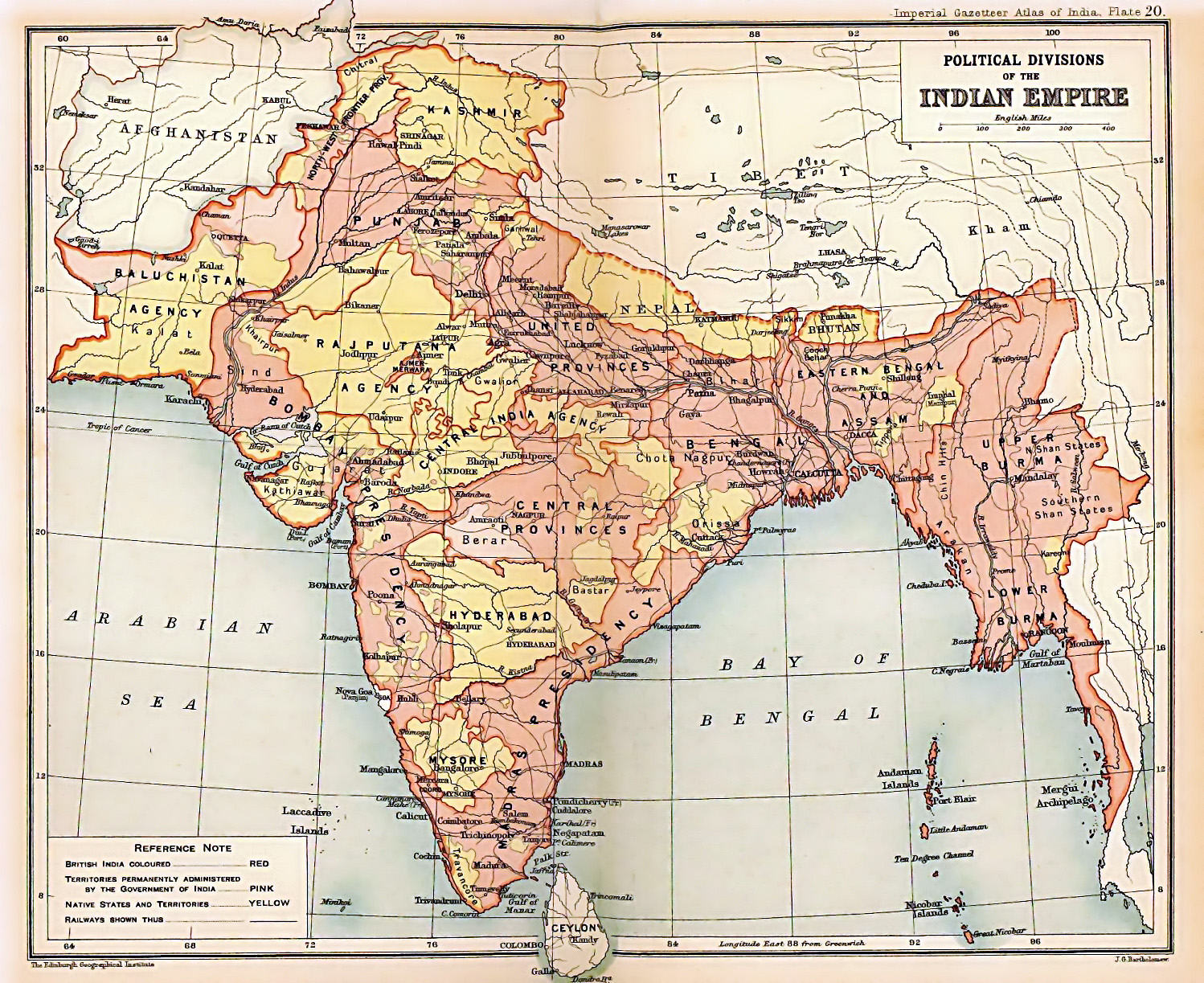
A 1909 British map showing India's northern boundary with China

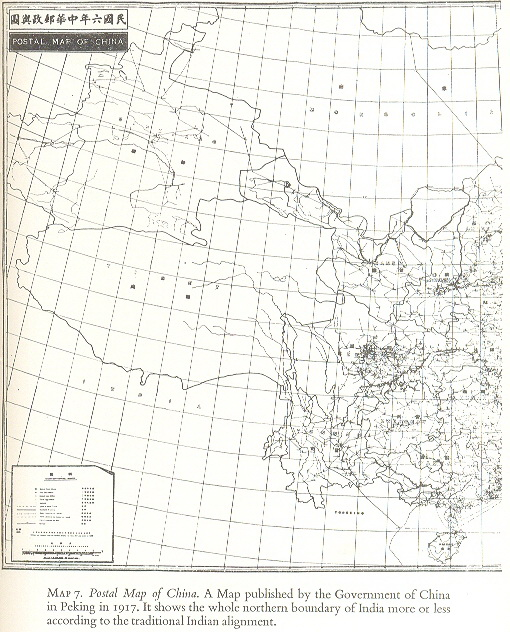
A 1917 Chinese map showing its southern border with India

== Background ==
The main cause of the war was a dispute over the sovereignty of the widely separated Aksai Chin and NESA border regions. Aksai Chin was claimed by India as belonging to Ladakh and by China to be a part of Xinjiang. China constructed a road through the region that connected the Chinese regions of Tibet and Xinjiang, which was one of the triggers of the conflict.

=== Aksai Chin ===
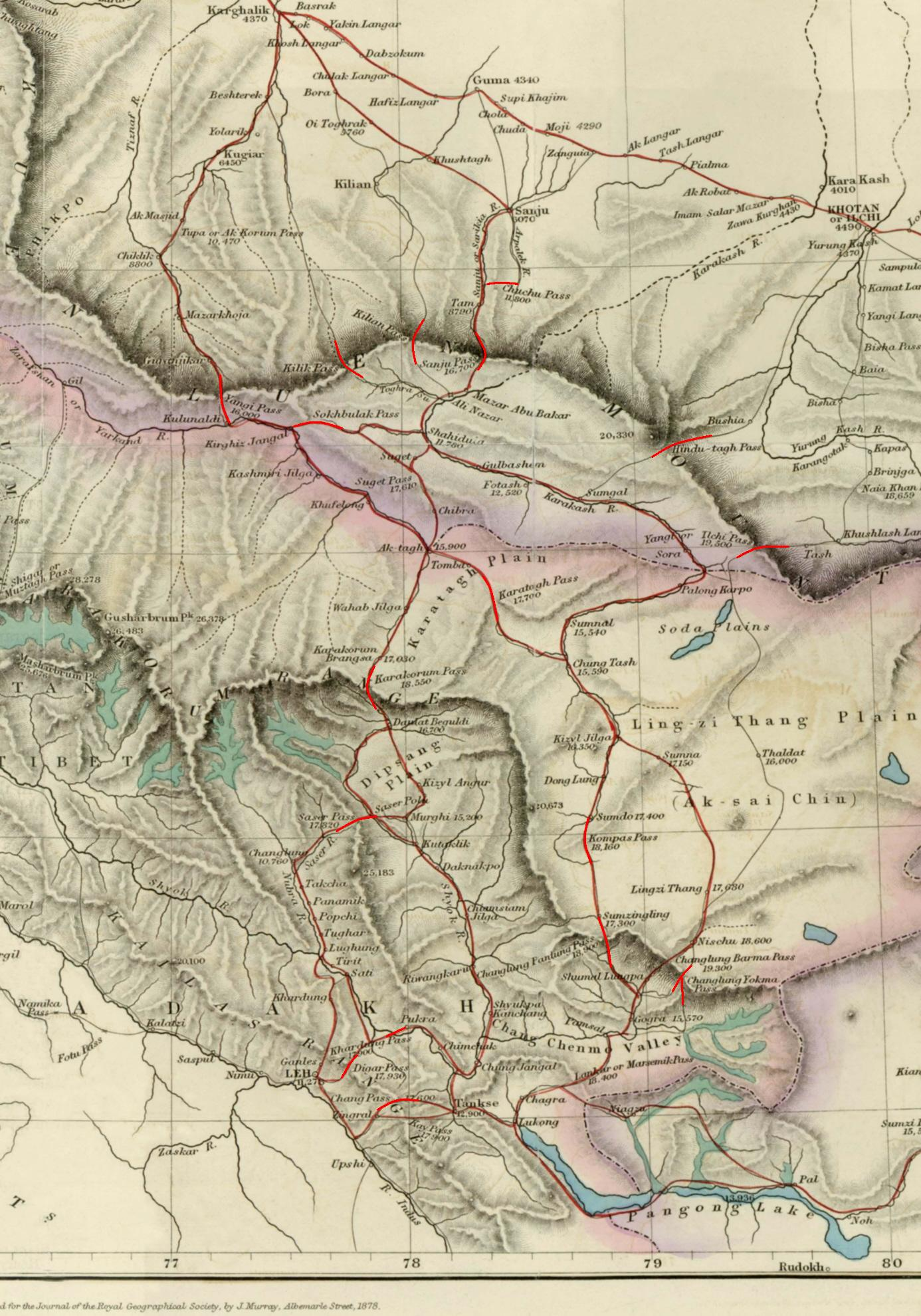
1878 British map showing the trade routes between Ladakh and Tarim Basin. The border preferred by British India, shown in two-toned purple and pink, included the Aksai Chin and narrowed down to the Yarkand River.

The western portion of the Sino-Indian boundary originated in 1834, with the conquest of Ladakh by the armies of Raja Gulab Singh (Dogra) under the suzerainty of the Sikh Empire. Following an unsuccessful campaign into Tibet, Gulab Singh and the Tibetans signed a treaty in 1842 agreeing to stick to the "old, established frontiers", which were left unspecified. The British defeat of the Sikhs in 1846 resulted in the transfer of the Jammu and Kashmir region including Ladakh to the British, who then installed Gulab Singh as the Maharaja under their suzerainty. British commissioners contacted Chinese officials to negotiate the border, who did not show any interest. The British boundary commissioners fixed the southern end of the boundary at Pangong Lake, but regarded the area north of it till the Karakoram Pass as terra incognita.

The Maharaja of Kashmir and his officials were keenly aware of the trade routes from Ladakh. Starting from Leh, there were two main routes into Central Asia: one passed through the Karakoram Pass to Shahidulla at the foot of the Kunlun Mountains and went on to Yarkand through the Kilian and Sanju passes; the other went east via the Chang Chenmo Valley, passed the Lingzi Tang Plains in the Aksai Chin region, and followed the course of the Karakash River to join the first route at Shahidulla. The Maharaja regarded Shahidulla as his northern outpost, in effect treating the Kunlun mountains as the boundary of his domains. His British suzerains were sceptical of such an extended boundary because Shahidulla was 79 miles (127 km) away from the Karakoram Pass and the intervening area was uninhabited. Nevertheless, the Maharaja was allowed to treat Shahidulla as his outpost for more than 20 years. (Note: Noorani, India–China Boundary Problem (2010), p. 48 quotes a report by Ney Elias in 1885: "He [the Wazir] wants the Maharaja to re-occupy Shahidulla in the Karakash valley. Previous to the rebellions in Eastern Turkistan which broke up Chinese rule there in 1863, the Kashmiris had occupied Shahidulla for nearly 20 years. About 1865 they abandoned it, and in 1868 Shaw and Hayward found it occupied by the Andijani (Kokandi) troops of the late Amir Yakub Beg. In 1873–74 Sir D. Forsyth recognised the Amir's ownership, and recommended the Maharaja's boundary to be drawn to the north of the Karakash valley as shown in the map accompanying the mission report. This I believe has never been accepted by Kashmir, and the boundary has been left an open question.") (Note: Noorani, India–China Boundary Problem (2010), p. 48, 83: An India Office (London) memorandum in 1893 stated: "Shahidulla has hitherto been regarded as the frontier post on the road from Leh to Yarkand. Lord Kimberley the secretary of state would suggest that the Chinese Government at Peking ... should be intimated...that the Indian authorities, acting on behalf of the Kashmir State, will gladly co-operate with the Chinese authorities in Kashgaria in determining the frontier on the road from Leh to Kashgar. Her Majesty's Government would, however, demur to any attempt being made by the Kashgarian officials to fix the boundary of the Ladakh State on this road without their previous concurrence being obtained.")

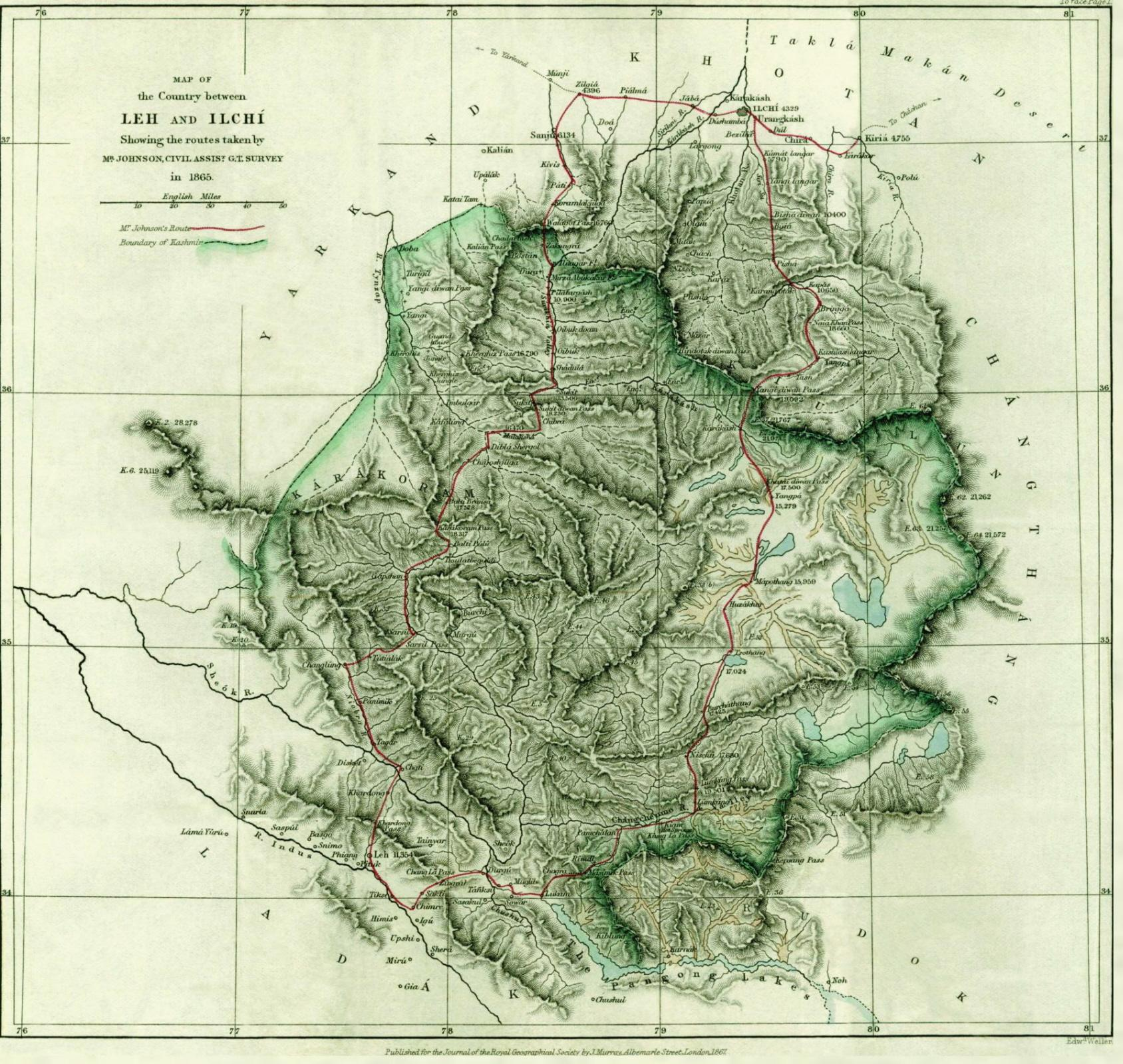
W. H. Johnson's route to Khotan and back (1865). Johnson's proposed boundary ran along the "northern branch" of the Kunlun Mountains.

Chinese Turkestan regarded the "northern branch" of the Kunlun range with the Kilian and Sanju passes as its southern boundary. Thus the Maharaja's claim was uncontested. (Note: Noorani, India–China Boundary Problem (2010), p. 58 quotes Captain Younghusband's report of 1889: "In the former Chinese occupation the Kuen-Lun Mountains (that is the branch of them over which are the Kilian and Sanju Passes) were always recognised as the frontier, and the country to the south belonged to no one in particular. When the Chinese revolt took place and they were driven from Yarkand, the Kashmir State sent a detachment of troops to Shahidullah and built a fort there. Yakub Beg when he came into power at Yarkand sent some troops, who built a fort at Ali Nazar on the Karakash River at the junction of the roads from the Kilian and Sanju Passes. Shortly afterwards the Kashmiris evacuated the Shahidullah fort after occupying it for about three years, and the Andijanis then took possession of it and occupied it till Yakub Beg's death.") After the 1862 Dungan Revolt, which saw the expulsion of the Chinese from Turkestan, the Maharaja of Kashmir constructed a small fort at Shahidulla in 1864. The fort was most likely supplied from Khotan, whose ruler was now independent and on friendly terms with Kashmir. When the Khotanese ruler was deposed by the Kashgaria strongman Yakub Beg, the Maharaja was forced to abandon his post in 1867. It was then occupied by Yakub Beg's forces until the end of the Dungan Revolt.

In the intervening period, W. H. Johnson of Survey of India was commissioned to survey the Aksai Chin region. While in the course of his work, he was "invited" by the Khotanese ruler to visit his capital. After returning, Johnson noted that Khotan's border was at Brinjga, in the Kunlun mountains, and the entire Karakash Valley was within the territory of Kashmir. The boundary of Kashmir that he drew, stretching from Sanju Pass to the eastern edge of Chang Chenmo Valley along the Kunlun mountains, is referred to as the "Johnson Line" (or "Ardagh-Johnson Line"). (Note: Some commentators state that Johnson's work was "severely criticised" as inaccurate. His boundary line was described as "patently absurd", and extending further north than the Indian claim. Johnson is said to have been reprimanded by the British Government for crossing into Khotan without permission and he resigned from the Survey. Others state that Johnson's bold explorations were highly commended, and he was rehired a year later at a higher salary. The "invitation" from the Khotanese ruler was likely a forcible removal, and the ruler was merely seeking British help in warding off Yakub Beg and the Russian Empire.)

After the Chinese reconquered Turkestan in 1878, renaming it Xinjiang, they again reverted to their traditional boundary. By now, the Russian Empire was entrenched in Central Asia, and the British were anxious to avoid a common border with the Russians. After creating the Wakhan corridor as the buffer in the northwest of Kashmir, they wanted the Chinese to fill out the "no man's land" between the Karakoram and Kunlun ranges. Under British (and possibly Russian) encouragement, the Chinese occupied the area up to the Yarkand River valley (called Raskam), including Shahidulla, by 1890. They also erected a boundary pillar at the Karakoram pass by about 1892. These efforts appear half-hearted. A map provided by Hung Ta-chen, a senior Chinese official at St. Petersburgh, in 1893 showed the boundary of Xinjiang up to Raskam. In the east, it was similar to the Johnson line, placing Aksai Chin in Kashmir territory.

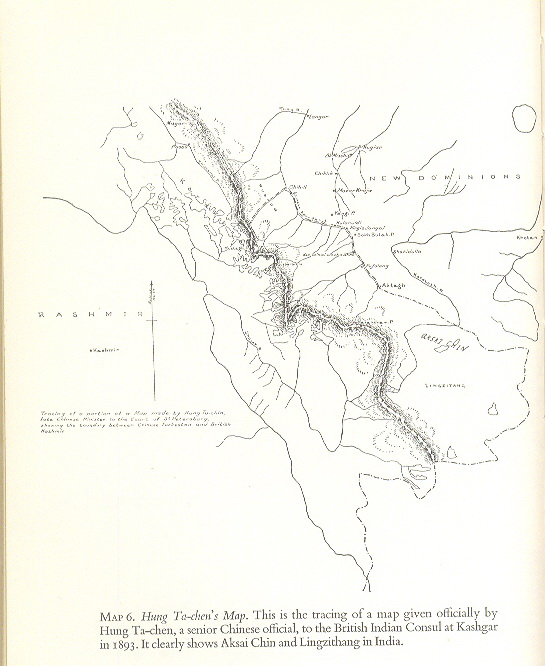
Hung Ta-chen's map handed to the British consul at Kashgar in 1893. The boundary, marked with a thin dot-dashed line, agreed with the 1878 British map.

By 1892, the British settled on the policy that their preferred boundary for Kashmir was the "Indus watershed", i.e., the water-parting from which waters flow into the Indus river system on one side and into the Tarim basin on the other. In the north, this water-parting was along the Karakoram range. In the east, it was more complicated because the Chip Chap River, Galwan River and the Chang Chenmo River flow into the Indus whereas the Karakash River flows into the Tarim basin. A boundary alignment along this water-parting was defined by the Viceroy Lord Elgin and communicated to London. The British government in due course proposed it to China via its envoy Sir Claude MacDonald in 1899. This boundary, which came to be called the Macartney–MacDonald Line, ceded to China the Aksai Chin plains in the northeast, and the Trans-Karakoram Tract in the north. In return, the British wanted China to cede its 'shadowy suzerainty' on Hunza. (Note: The so-called Macartney-MacDonald proposal was precipitated by the crisis over Hunza, which was theoretically a vassal state of both China and Kashmir. In 1890, the British invaded Hunza and replaced its ruler, and the Chinese remonstrated. The British wanted the Chinese to cede their suzerainty over Hunza and yet grant rights to cultivate lands outside its boundary. In return for this largesse, they were prepared to cede the Aksai Chin plains, but not Lingzi Tang plains, to China. Scholar Parshotam Mehra has termed it a 'barter'.)

Following the Xinhai Revolution in 1911 which resulted in power shifts in China, the fall of Tzarist Russia in 1917 and the end of World War I in 1918, the British officially used the Johnson Line but had lost the urgency to enforce this boundary. They took no steps to establish outposts or assert control on the ground. According to Neville Maxwell, the British had used as many as 11 different boundary lines in the region, as their claims shifted with the political situation. From 1917 to 1933, the "Postal Atlas of China", published by the Government of China in Peking had shown the boundary in Aksai Chin as per the Johnson line, which runs along the Kunlun Mountains. The "Peking University Atlas", published in 1925, also put the Aksai Chin in India.

The use of Johnson line or Macartney-MacDonald line was neglected by the colonial administrators and by 1947, when India gained independence, the British left the government of India with high ambiguity about the settled border to the North. The Indian government choose to lay claim to Aksai Chin after 1947. On 1 July 1954, India's first Prime Minister Jawaharlal Nehru definitively stated the Indian position, claiming that Aksai Chin had been part of the Indian Ladakh region for centuries, and that the border (as defined by the Johnson Line) was non-negotiable. According to George N. Patterson, when the Indian government finally produced a report detailing the alleged proof of India's claims to the disputed area, "the quality of the Indian evidence was very poor, including some very dubious sources indeed".

In 1956–57, China constructed a road through Aksai Chin, connecting Xinjiang and Tibet, which ran south of the Johnson Line in many places. Aksai Chin was easily accessible to the Chinese, but access from India, which meant negotiating the Karakoram mountains, was much more difficult. The road came on Chinese maps published in 1958.

=== The McMahon Line ===
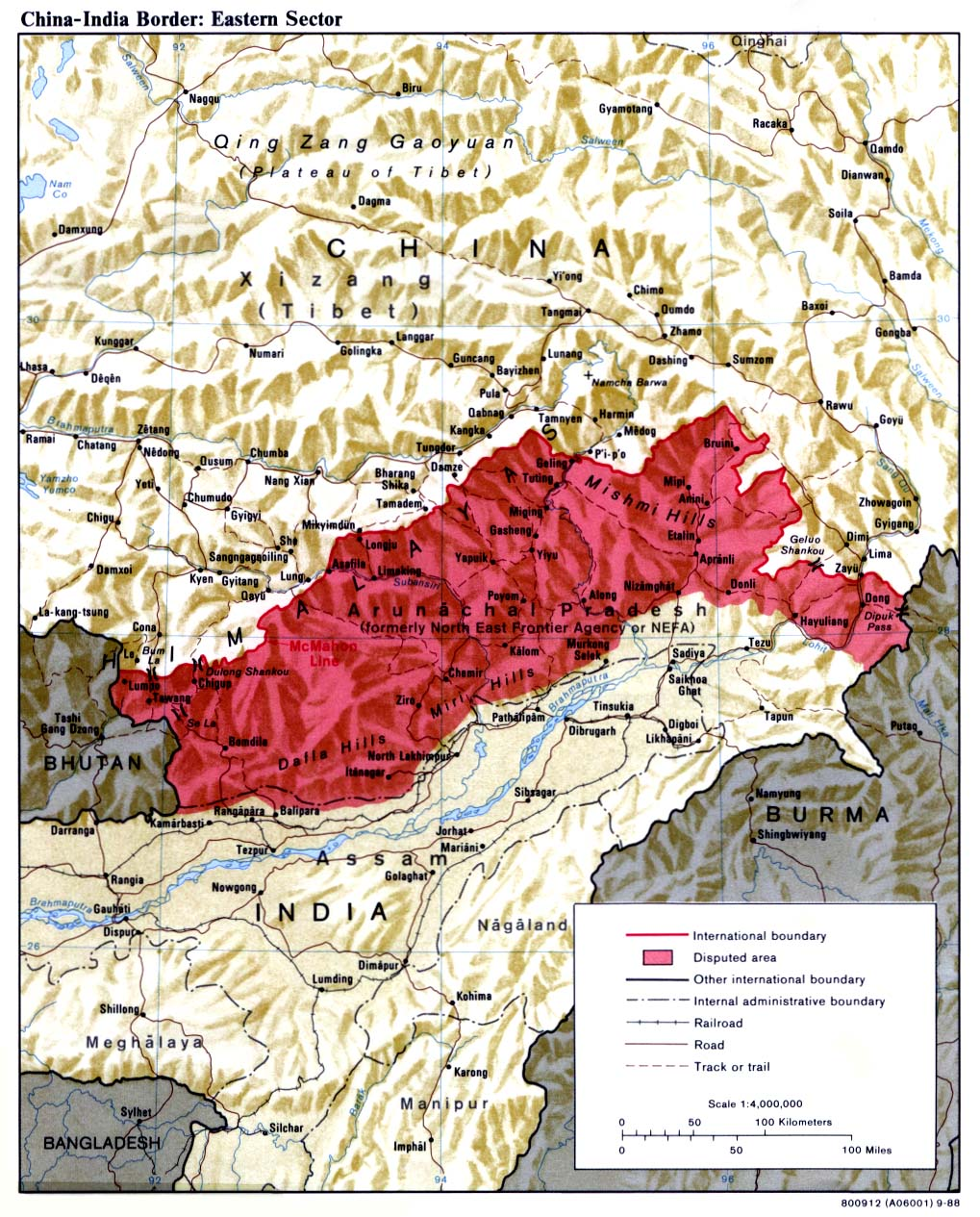
The McMahon Line is the red line marking the northern boundary of the disputed area.

In 1826, British India gained a common border with Tibet after the British wrested control of Manipur and Assam from the Burmese, following the First Anglo-Burmese War of 1824–1826. In 1847, Major J. Jenkins, agent for the North East Frontier, reported that the Tawang was part of Tibet. In 1872, four monastic officials from Tibet arrived in Tawang and supervised a boundary settlement with Major R. Graham, NEFA official, which included the Tawang Tract as part of Tibet. In 1873, the British drew an "Inner Line" as an administrative line to inhibit their subjects from encroaching into the tribal territory within its control. The British boundary, also called the "Outer Line", was defined to mark the limits of British jurisdiction. But it was not significantly different from the Inner Line in this region.

By 1873, it was clear that the British treated the Tawang Tract as part of Tibet. This boundary was confirmed in a 1 June 1912 note from the British General Staff in India.

In 1904, in order to skew Tibet away from Russian influence, an Anglo-Tibetan treaty was written called the Convention of Lhasa. This treaty alarmed the Chinese which started displaying power by crushing rebellions and erecting flags and boundary stones in the Lohit Valley which were mostly removed by the British by 1910. Such aggression from the Chinese conveyed to the Colonial administration that the Tawang tract could serve as a route of invasion in the future.

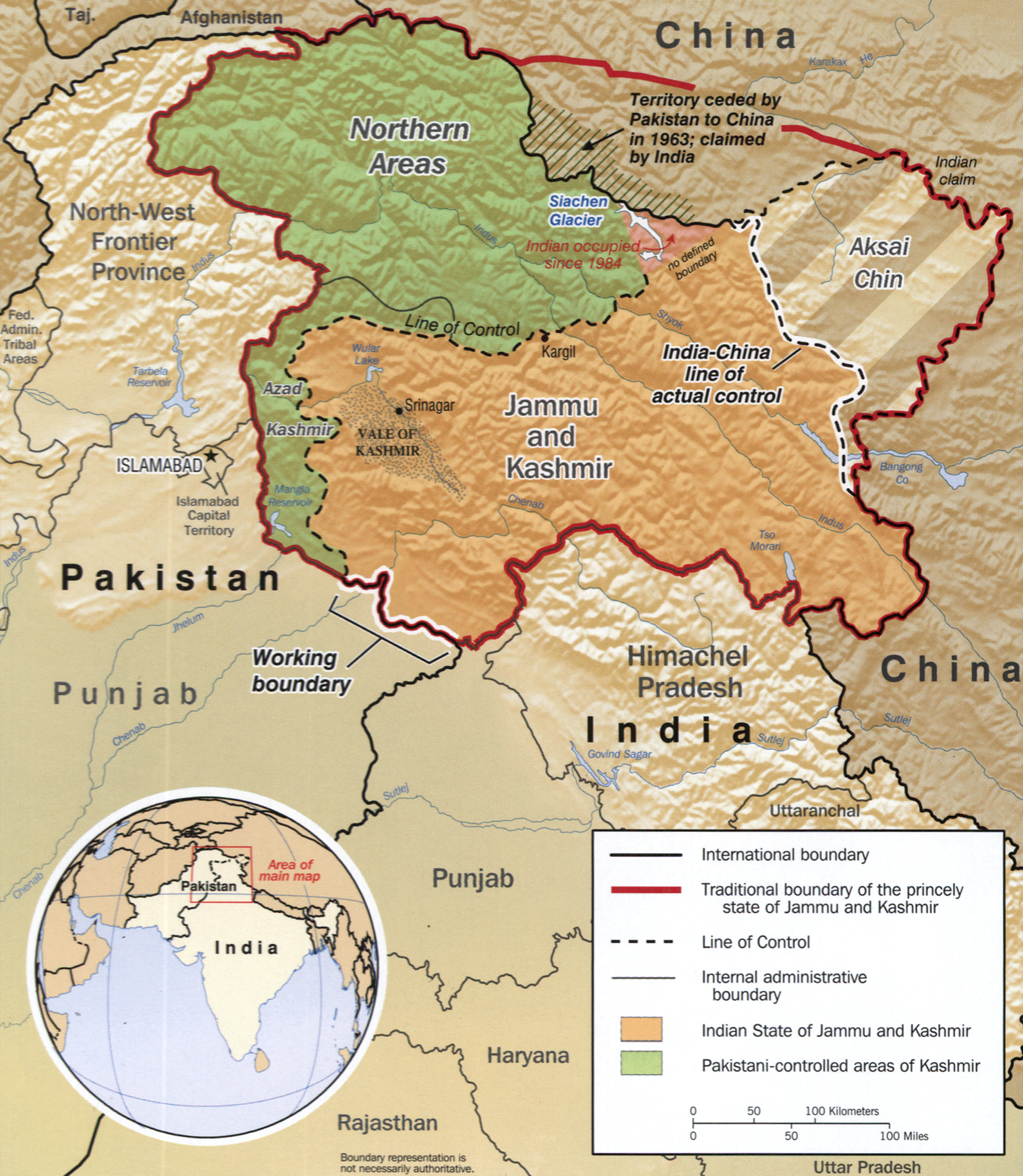
Traditional borders of the Kashmir region as depicted on a CIA map. The northern boundary is along the Karakash Valley, and Aksai Chin is the shaded region in the east.

After the 1911 Revolution, UK sat a weakened China along with Tibet in the Simla Convention to settle the borders between Tibet, China and British India. The foreign secretary of the British Indian government, Henry McMahon was the driving force in this conference. After carrying out surveys, the conference drew the McMahon Line. Whilst all three representatives initialed the agreement, Beijing later objected to the proposed boundary and did not ratify it. McMahon decided to bypass the Chinese (although instructed not to by his superiors) and settle the border bilaterally by negotiating directly with Tibet.

According to later Indian claims, this border was intended to run through the highest ridges of the Himalayas, as the areas south of the Himalayas were traditionally Indian. The McMahon Line lay south of the boundary India claims. India's government held the view that the Himalayas were the ancient boundaries of the Indian subcontinent, and thus should be the modern boundaries of India, while it is the position of the Chinese government that the disputed area in the Himalayas have been geographically and culturally part of Tibet since ancient times.

The British-run Government of India initially rejected the Simla Agreement as incompatible with the Anglo-Russian Convention of 1907, which stipulated that neither party was to negotiate with Tibet "except through the intermediary of the Chinese government". The British and Russians cancelled the 1907 agreement by joint consent in 1921. It was not until the late 1930s that the British started to use the McMahon Line on official maps of the region.

China took the position that the Tibetan government should not have been allowed to make such a treaty, rejecting Tibet's claims of independent rule. For its part, Tibet did not object to any section of the McMahon Line excepting the demarcation of the trading town of Tawang, which the Line placed under British-Indian jurisdiction. Up until World War II, Tibetan officials were allowed to administer Tawang with complete authority. Due to the increased threat of Japanese and Chinese expansion during this period, British Indian troops secured the town as part of the defence of India's eastern border.

In the 1950s, India began patrolling the region. It found that, at multiple locations, the highest ridges actually fell north of the McMahon Line. Given India's historic position that the original intent of the line was to separate the two nations by the highest mountains in the world, in these locations India extended its forward posts northward to the ridges, regarding this move as compliant with the original border proposal, although the Simla Convention did not explicitly state this intention.

== Events leading up to war ==
=== Border dispute after Partition of India and formation of the PRC ===
British India was partitioned in 1947 and split into India and Pakistan while the Chinese Civil War resulted in the formation of People's Republic of China in 1949. One of the most basic policies for the new Indian government was that of maintaining cordial relations with China, reviving its ancient friendly ties. India was among the first nations to grant diplomatic recognition to the newly created PRC.

In 1950, the Chinese People's Liberation Army (PLA) invaded Tibet, which the Chinese governments regarded as still part of China. Later the Chinese extended their influence by building a road in 1956–67 and placing border posts in Aksai Chin. India protested against these moves and decided to look for a diplomatic solution to ensure a stable Sino-Indian border. To resolve any doubts about the Indian position, Prime Minister Jawaharlal Nehru declared in parliament that India regarded the McMahon Line as its official border. The Chinese expressed no concern at this statement.

At the time, Chinese officials issued no condemnation of Nehru's claims or made any opposition to Nehru's open declarations of control over Aksai Chin. In 1956, Chinese Premier Zhou Enlai stated that he had no claims over Indian-controlled territory. He later argued that Aksai Chin was already under Chinese jurisdiction and that the McCartney-MacDonald Line was the line China could accept. Zhou later argued that as the boundary was undemarcated and had never been defined by treaty between any Chinese or Indian government, the Indian government could not unilaterally define Aksai Chin's borders.

In 1954, Nehru wrote a memo calling for India's borders to be clearly defined and demarcated; in line with previous Indian philosophy, Indian maps showed a border that, in some places, lay north of the McMahon Line. Chinese Premier Zhou Enlai, in November 1956, assured India that China had no claims on Indian territory, although official Chinese maps showed 120,000 square kilometres (46,000 sq mi) of territory claimed by India as Chinese. They also allege that Zhou purposefully told Nehru that there were no border issues with India.

In 1954, China and India negotiated the Five Principles of Peaceful Coexistence, by which the two nations agreed to abide in settling their disputes. India presented a frontier map which was accepted by China, and the slogan Hindi-Chini bhai-bhai (Indians and Chinese are brothers) was popularised. Nehru in 1958 had privately told G. Parthasarathi, the Indian envoy to China not to trust the Chinese at all and send all communications directly to him, bypassing the Defence Minister VK Krishna Menon since his communist background clouded his thinking about China. According to John W Garver, Nehru's policy on Tibet was to create a strong Sino-Indian partnership which would be catalysed through agreement and compromise on Tibet. Garver believes that Nehru's previous actions had given him confidence that China would be ready to form an "Asian Axis" with India.

This apparent progress in relations suffered a major setback when, in 1959, Nehru accommodated the Tibetan religious leader at the time, the 14th Dalai Lama, who fled Lhasa after a failed Tibetan uprising against Chinese rule. The Chairman of the Chinese Communist Party, Mao Zedong, was enraged and asked the Xinhua News Agency to produce reports on Indian expansionists operating in Tibet.

Armed clashes increased over summer 1959. On 25 August 1959, a group of Indian soldiers crossed into the Longju area, north of the McMahon Line. The PLA took an Indian prisoner.

On 2 October, Soviet first secretary Nikita Khrushchev defended Nehru in a meeting with Mao. This action reinforced China's impression that the Soviet Union, the United States and India all had expansionist designs on China. The PLA went so far as to prepare a self-defence counterattack plan. Negotiations were restarted between the nations, but no progress was made.

On 21 October, there was a small scale clash at Kongka Pass. The Chinese and Indian sides each claimed that the other side shot first. Zhou Enlai proposed a mutual withdrawal to 12.4 miles behind the McMahon Line. The Indian government did not respond.

As a consequence of their non-recognition of the McMahon Line, China's maps showed both the North East Frontier Area (NEFA) and Aksai Chin to be Chinese territory. In 1960, Zhou Enlai unofficially suggested that India drop its claims to Aksai Chin in return for a Chinese withdrawal of claims over NEFA. Adhering to his stated position, Nehru believed that China did not have a legitimate claim over either of these territories, and thus was not ready to concede them. This adamant stance was perceived in China as Indian opposition to Chinese rule in Tibet. Nehru declined to conduct any negotiations on the boundary until Chinese troops withdrew from Aksai Chin, a position supported by the international community.

India produced numerous reports on the negotiations, and translated Chinese reports into English to help inform the international debate. China believed that India was simply securing its claim lines in order to continue its "grand plans in Tibet". India's stance that China withdraw from Aksai Chin caused continual deterioration of the diplomatic situation to the point that internal forces were pressuring Nehru to take a military stance against China.

=== 1960 meetings to resolve the boundary question ===
In 1960, based on an agreement between Nehru and Zhou Enlai, officials from India and China held discussions in order to settle the boundary dispute. China and India disagreed on the major watershed that defined the boundary in the western sector. The Chinese statements with respect to their border claims often misrepresented the cited sources. The failure of these negotiations was compounded by successful Chinese border agreements with Nepal (Sino-Nepalese Treaty of Peace and Friendship) and Burma in the same year.

=== Forward policy ===
In the summer of 1961, China began patrolling along the McMahon Line. They entered parts of Indian administered regions. The Chinese, however, did not believe they were intruding upon Indian territory. In response the Indians launched a policy of creating outposts behind the Chinese troops so as to cut off their supplies and force their return to China.

On 5 December 1961 orders went to the Eastern and Western commands:

[...] We are to patrol as far forward as possible from our present positions towards the International Border as recognized by us. This will be done with a view to establishing additional posts located to prevent the Chinese from advancing further and also to dominate any Chinese posts already established in our territory. [...]

This has been referred to as the "forward policy". There were eventually 60 such outposts, including 43 along the Chinese-claimed frontier in Aksai Chin.

Indian leaders believed, based on previous diplomacy, that the Chinese would not react with force. According to the Indian Official History, Indian posts and Chinese posts were separated by a narrow stretch of land. China had been steadily spreading into those lands and India reacted with the forward policy to demonstrate that those lands were not unoccupied. Neville Maxwell traces this confidence to the Intelligence Bureau chief Mullik.

The initial reaction of the Chinese forces was to withdraw when Indian outposts advanced towards them. However, this appeared to encourage the Indian forces to accelerate their forward policy even further. In response, the Central Military Commission adopted a policy of "armed coexistence". In response to Indian outposts encircling Chinese positions, Chinese forces would build more outposts to counter-encircle these Indian positions. This pattern of encirclement and counter-encirclement resulted in an interlocking, chessboard-like deployment of Chinese and Indian forces. Despite the leapfrogging encirclements by both sides, no hostile fire occurred from either side as troops from both sides were under orders to fire only in defense. On the situation, Mao commented,

Nehru wants to move forward and we won't let him. Originally, we tried to guard against this, but now it seems we cannot prevent it. If he wants to advance, we might as well adopt armed coexistence. You wave a gun, and I'll wave a gun. We'll stand face to face and can each practice our courage.

The attacks by China beginning on 20 October 1962 were retaliation for the forward policy. That year, the CPC Central Committee and the Central Military Commission instructed the PLA to mobilize frontier troops for a counteroffensive campaign.

=== Early incidents ===
Various border conflicts and "military incidents" between India and China flared up throughout the summer and autumn of 1962. In May, the Indian Air Force was told not to plan for close air support, although it was assessed as being a feasible way to counter the unfavourable ratio of Chinese to Indian troops. In June, a skirmish caused the deaths of dozens of Chinese troops. The Indian Intelligence Bureau received information about a Chinese buildup along the border which could be a precursor to war.

During June–July 1962, Indian military planners began advocating "probing actions" against the Chinese, and accordingly, moved mountain troops forward to cut off Chinese supply lines. According to Patterson, the Indian motives were threefold:

1. Test Chinese resolve and intentions regarding India.
2. Test whether India would enjoy Soviet backing in the event of a Sino-Indian war.
3. Create sympathy for India within the U.S., with whom relations had deteriorated after the Indian annexation of Goa.

On 10 July 1962, 350 Chinese troops surrounded an Indian post in Chushul (north of the McMahon Line) but withdrew after a heated argument via loudspeaker. On 22 July, the forward policy was extended to allow Indian troops to push back Chinese troops already established in disputed territory. Whereas Indian troops were previously ordered to fire only in self-defence, all post commanders were now given discretion to open fire upon Chinese forces if threatened. In August, the Chinese military improved its combat readiness along the McMahon Line and began stockpiling ammunition, weapons and fuel.

Given his foreknowledge of the coming Cuban Missile Crisis, Mao was able to persuade Khrushchev to reverse the Russian policy of backing India, at least temporarily. In mid-October, the Communist organ Pravda encouraged peace between India and China. When the Cuban Missile Crisis ended and Mao's rhetoric changed, Russia reversed course.

== Confrontation at Thagla Ridge ==
Namka Chu flowing under the India-China border (Note: The Line of Actual Control drawn by the contributors to the OpenStreetMap.)

In June 1962, Indian forces established an outpost called the Dhola Post on the northern slopes of Tsangdhar Range, in the right-side of Namka Chu valley, facing the southern slopes of Thagla Ridge. Clearly, the Dhola Post lay north of the map-marked McMahon Line which straight across Tsangdhar Range but south of Thagla Ridge along which India interpreted the McMahon Line to run. In August, China issued diplomatic protests and began occupying positions at the top of Thagla Ridge.

On 8 September, a 60-strong PLA unit descended to the south side of the ridge and occupied positions that dominated one of the Indian posts at Namka Chu. Fire was not exchanged, but Nehru told the media that the Indian Army had instructions to "free our territory" and the troops had been given discretion to use force. On 11 September, it was decided that "all forward posts and patrols were given permission to fire on any armed Chinese who entered Indian territory".

The operation to occupy Thagla Ridge was flawed in that Nehru's directives were unclear, delaying it. In addition, each man had to carry 35 kilograms (77 lb) over the long trek, greatly slowing the reaction. By the time the Indian battalion reached the point of conflict, Chinese units controlled both banks of the Namka Chu River. On 20 September, Chinese troops threw grenades at Indian troops and a firefight developed, triggering a long series of skirmishes for the rest of September.

Some Indian troops, including Brigadier Dalvi who commanded the forces at Thagla Ridge, were also concerned that the territory they were fighting for was not strictly territory that "we should have been convinced was ours". According to Neville Maxwell, even members of the Indian defence ministry were categorically concerned with the validity of the fighting in Thagla Ridge.

On 4 October, Brij Mohan Kaul, commanding IV Corps, assigned some troops to secure regions south of the Thagla Ridge. Kaul decided to first secure Yumtso La, a strategically important position, before re-entering the lost Dhola Post. Kaul had then realised that the attack would be desperate and the Indian government tried to stop an escalation into all-out war. Indian troops marching to Thagla Ridge had suffered in the previously unexperienced conditions; two Gurkha soldiers died of pulmonary edema.

On 10 October, an Indian Rajput patrol of 50 troops to Yumtso La were met by an emplaced Chinese position of some 1,000 soldiers. Indian troops were in no position for battle, as Yumtso La was 16,000 feet (4,900 m) above sea level and Kaul did not plan on having artillery support for the troops. The Chinese troops opened fire on the Indians, thinking they were north of the McMahon Line. The Indians were surrounded by Chinese positions, which used mortar fire. They managed to hold off the first Chinese assault, inflicting heavy casualties.

At this point, the Indian troops were in a position to push the Chinese back with mortar and machine gun fire. Brigadier Dalvi opted not to fire, as it would mean decimating the Rajput who were still in the area of the Chinese regrouping. They helplessly watched the Chinese ready themselves for a second assault. In the second Chinese assault, the Indians began their retreat, realising the situation was hopeless. The Indian patrol suffered 25 casualties and the Chinese 33. The Chinese troops held their fire as the Indians retreated, and then buried the Indian dead with military honours, as witnessed by the retreating soldiers. This was the first occurrence of heavy fighting in the war.

This attack had grave implications for India and Nehru tried to solve the issue, but by 18 October, it was clear that the Chinese were preparing for an attack, with a massive troop buildup. A long line of mules and porters had also been observed supporting the buildup and reinforcement of positions south of the Thagla Ridge.

== Chinese preparations ==
=== Chinese motives ===
Two of the major factors leading up to China's eventual conflicts with Indian troops were India's stance on the disputed borders and perceived Indian subversion in Tibet. There was "a perceived need to punish and end perceived Indian efforts to undermine Chinese control of Tibet, Indian efforts which were perceived as having the objective of restoring the pre-1949 status quo ante of Tibet". The other was "a perceived need to punish and end perceived Indian aggression against Chinese territory along the border". John W. Garver argues that the first perception was incorrect based on the state of the Indian military and polity in the 1960s. It was, nevertheless a major reason for China's going to war. He argues that while the Chinese perception of Indian border actions were "substantially accurate", Chinese perceptions of the supposed Indian policy towards Tibet were "substantially inaccurate".

The CIA's declassified POLO documents reveal contemporary American analysis of Chinese motives during the war. According to this document, "Chinese apparently were motivated to attack by one primary consideration — their determination to retain the ground on which PLA forces stood in 1962 and to punish the Indians for trying to take that ground". In general terms, they tried to show the Indians once and for all that China would not acquiesce in a military "reoccupation" policy. Secondary reasons for the attack were to damage Nehru's prestige by exposing Indian weakness and to expose as traitorous Khrushchev's policy of supporting Nehru against a Communist country.

Another factor which might have affected China's decision for war with India was a perceived need to stop a Soviet-U.S.-India encirclement and isolation of China. India's relations with the Soviet Union and United States were both strong at this time, but the Soviets (and Americans) were preoccupied by the Cuban Missile Crisis and would not interfere with the Sino-Indian War. P. B. Sinha suggests that China waited until October to attack because the timing of the war was exactly in parallel with American actions so as to avoid any chance of American or Soviet involvement. Although American buildup of forces around Cuba occurred on the same day as the first major clash at Dhola Post, and China's buildup between 10 and 20 October appeared to coincide exactly with the United States establishment of a blockade against Cuba which began 20 October, the Chinese probably prepared for this before they could anticipate what would happen in Cuba.

In May to June 1962, the KMT government of Republic of China on Taiwan under Chiang Kai-shek's leadership was propagating the policy of 'Reclaim the mainland China', causing fear of invasion from Taiwan among Chinese Communist leadership and the shift of concern to the Southeast. Reluctant to divert resources to the hostilities in the Himalayas, Chinese leadership thought a two-front war undesirable. From July on, after receiving American assurances that KMT government would not invade, China began to focus on the Indian border.

Garver argues that the Chinese correctly assessed Indian border policies, particularly the forward policy, as attempts for incremental seizure of Chinese-controlled territory. On Tibet, Garver argues that one of the major factors leading to China's decision for war with India was a common tendency of humans "to attribute others' behavior to interior motivations, while attributing their own behavior to situational factors". Studies from China published in the 1990s confirmed that the root cause for China going to war with India was the perceived Indian aggression in Tibet, with the forward policy simply catalysing the Chinese reaction.

Neville Maxwell and Allen Whiting argue that the Chinese leadership believed they were defending territory that was legitimately Chinese, and which was already under de facto Chinese occupation prior to Indian advances, and regarded the forward policy as an Indian attempt at creeping annexation. Mao Zedong himself compared the forward policy to a strategic advance in Chinese chess:

Their [India's] continually pushing forward is like crossing the Chu Han boundary. What should we do? We can also set out a few pawns, on our side of the river. If they don't then cross over, that's great. If they do cross, we'll eat them up [chess metaphor meaning to take the opponent's pieces]. Of course, we cannot blindly eat them. Lack of forbearance in small matters upsets great plans. We must pay attention to the situation.

Chinese policy toward India, therefore, operated on two seemingly contradictory assumptions in the first half of 1961. On the one hand, the Chinese leaders continued to entertain a hope, although a shrinking one, that some opening for talks would appear. On the other hand, they read Indian statements and actions as clear signs that Nehru wanted to talk only about a Chinese withdrawal. Regarding the hope, they were willing to negotiate and tried to prod Nehru into a similar attitude. Regarding Indian intentions, they began to act politically and to build a rationale based on the assumption that Nehru already had become a lackey of imperialism; for this reason he opposed border talks.

Krishna Menon is reported to have said that when he arrived in Geneva on 6 June 1961 for an international conference in Laos, Chinese officials in Chen Yi's delegation indicated that Chen might be interested in discussing the border dispute with him. At several private meetings with Menon, Chen avoided any discussion of the dispute and Menon surmised that the Chinese wanted him to broach the matter first. He did not, as he was under instructions from Nehru to avoid taking the initiative, leaving the Chinese with the impression that Nehru was unwilling to show any flexibility.

In September, the Chinese took a step toward criticising Nehru openly in their commentary. After citing Indonesian and Burmese press criticism of Nehru by name, the Chinese critiqued his moderate remarks on colonialism (People's Daily Editorial, 9 September): "Somebody at the Non-Aligned Nations Conference advanced the argument that the era of classical colonialism is gone and dead...contrary to facts." This was a distortion of Nehru's remarks but appeared close enough to be credible. On the same day, Chen Yi referred to Nehru by implication at the Bulgarian embassy reception: "Those who attempted to deny history, ignore reality, and distort the truth and who attempted to divert the Conference from its important object have failed to gain support and were isolated." On 10 September, they dropped all circumlocutions and criticised him by name in a China Youth article and NCNA report—the first time in almost two years that they had commented extensively on the Prime Minister.

By early 1962, the Chinese leadership began to believe that India's intentions were to launch a massive attack against Chinese troops, and that the Indian leadership wanted a war. In 1961, the Indian Army had been sent into Goa, a small region without any other international borders apart from the Indian one, after Portugal refused to surrender the exclave colony to the Indian Union. Although this action met little to no international protest or opposition, China saw it as an example of India's expansionist nature, especially in light of heated rhetoric from Indian politicians. India's Home Minister declared, "If the Chinese will not vacate the areas occupied by it, India will have to repeat what it did in Goa. India will certainly drive out the Chinese forces", while another member of the Indian Congress Party pronounced, "India will take steps to end [Chinese] aggression on Indian soil just as it ended Portuguese aggression in Goa".

By mid-1962, it was apparent to the Chinese leadership that negotiations had failed to make any progress, and the forward policy was increasingly perceived as a grave threat as Delhi increasingly sent probes deeper into border areas and cut off Chinese supply lines. Foreign Minister Marshal Chen Yi commented at one high-level meeting, "Nehru's forward policy is a knife. He wants to put it in our heart. We cannot close our eyes and await death." The Chinese leadership believed that their restraint on the issue was being perceived by India as weakness, leading to continued provocations, and that a major counterblow was needed to stop perceived Indian aggression.

Xu Yan, prominent Chinese military historian and professor at the PLA's National Defense University, gives an account of the Chinese leadership's decision to go to war. By late September 1962, the Chinese leadership had begun to reconsider their policy of "armed coexistence", which had failed to address their concerns with the forward policy and Tibet, and consider a large, decisive strike. On 22 September 1962, the People's Daily published an article which claimed that "the Chinese people were burning with 'great indignation' over the Indian actions on the border and that New Delhi could not 'now say that warning was not served in advance'."

=== Military planning ===
The Indian side was confident war would not be triggered and made little preparations. India had only two divisions of troops in the region of the conflict. In August 1962, Brigadier D. K. Palit claimed that a war with China in the near future could be ruled out. Even in September 1962, when Indian troops were ordered to "expel the Chinese" from Thagla Ridge, Maj. General J. S. Dhillon expressed the opinion that "experience in Ladakh had shown that a few rounds fired at the Chinese would cause them to run away." Because of this, the Indian Army was completely unprepared when the attack at Yumtso La occurred.

Declassified CIA documents which were compiled at the time reveal that India's estimates of Chinese capabilities made them neglect their military in favour of economic growth. It is claimed that if a more military-minded man had been in place instead of Nehru, India would have been more likely to have been ready for the threat of a counter-attack from China.

On 6 October 1962, the Chinese leadership convened. Defence minister, Lin Biao, reported that PLA intelligence units had determined that Indian units might assault Chinese positions at Thagla Ridge on 10 October (Operation Leghorn). The Chinese leadership and the Central Military Council decided upon war to launch a large-scale attack to punish perceived military aggression from India. In Beijing, a larger meeting of Chinese military was convened in order to plan for the coming conflict.

Mao and the Chinese leadership issued a directive laying out the objectives for the war. A main assault would be launched in the eastern sector, which would be coordinated with a smaller assault in the western sector. All Indian troops within China's claimed territories in the eastern sector would be expelled, and the war would be ended with a unilateral Chinese ceasefire and withdrawal, followed by a return to the negotiating table. India led the Non-Aligned Movement, Nehru enjoyed international prestige, and China, with a larger military, would be portrayed as an aggressor. He said that a well-fought war "will guarantee at least thirty years of peace" with India, and determined the benefits to offset the costs.

China also reportedly bought a significant amount of Indian rupee currency from Hong Kong, supposedly to distribute amongst its soldiers in preparation for the war.

On 8 October, additional veteran and elite divisions were ordered to prepare to move into Tibet from the Chengdu and Lanzhou military regions.

On 14 October, an editorial on People's Daily issued China's final warning to India: "So it seems that Mr. Nehru has made up his mind to attack the Chinese frontier guards on an even bigger scale. ... It is high time to shout to Mr. Nehru that the heroic Chinese troops, with the glorious tradition of resisting foreign aggression, can never be cleared by anyone from their own territory ... If there are still some maniacs who are reckless enough to ignore our well-intentioned advice and insist on having another try, well, let them do so. History will pronounce its inexorable verdict ... At this critical moment ... we still want to appeal once more to Mr. Nehru: better rein in at the edge of the precipice and do not use the lives of Indian troops as stakes in your gamble."

Marshal Liu Bocheng headed a group to determine the strategy for the war. He concluded that the opposing Indian troops were among India's best, and to achieve victory would require deploying crack troops and relying on force concentration to achieve decisive victory. On 16 October, this war plan was approved, and on the 18th, the final approval was given by the Politburo for a "self-defensive counter-attack", scheduled for 20 October.

== Chinese offensive ==
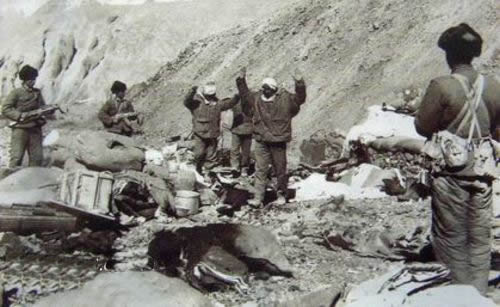
Indian soldiers surrender to Chinese forces

On 20 October 1962, the PLA launched two attacks, 1,000 kilometres (620 mi) apart. In the western theatre, the PLA sought to expel Indian forces from the Chip Chap valley in Aksai Chin while in the eastern theatre, the PLA sought to capture both banks of the Namka Chu river. Gurkha rifles travelling north were targeted by Chinese artillery fire. After four days of fierce fighting, the three regiments of Chinese troops succeeded in securing a substantial portion of the disputed territory.

=== Eastern theatre ===
Chinese troops launched an attack on the southern banks of the Namka Chu River on 20 October. The Indian forces were undermanned, with only an understrength battalion to support them, while the Chinese troops had three regiments positioned on the north side of the river. The Indians expected Chinese forces to cross via one of five bridges over the river and defended those crossings. The PLA bypassed the defenders by fording the river, which was shallow at that time of year, instead. They formed up into battalions on the Indian-held south side of the river under cover of darkness, with each battalion assigned against a separate group of Rajputs.

At 5:14 am, Chinese mortar fire began attacking the Indian positions. Simultaneously, the Chinese cut the Indian telephone lines, preventing the defenders from making contact with their headquarters. At about 6:30 am, the Chinese infantry launched a surprise attack from the rear and forced the Indians to leave their trenches. The Chinese overwhelmed the Indian troops in a series of flanking manoeuvres south of the McMahon Line and prompted their withdrawal from Namka Chu. Fearful of continued losses, Indian troops retreated into Bhutan. Chinese forces respected the border and did not pursue. Chinese forces now held all of the territory that was under dispute at the time of the Thagla Ridge confrontation, but they continued to advance into the rest of NEFA.

On 22 October, at 12:15 am, PLA mortars fired on Walong, on the McMahon line. Flares launched by Indian troops the next day revealed numerous Chinese milling around the valley. The Indians tried to use their mortars against the Chinese but the PLA responded by lighting a bush fire, causing confusion among the Indians. Some 400 PLA troops attacked the Indian position. The initial Chinese assault was halted by accurate Indian mortar fire. The Chinese were then reinforced and launched a second assault. The Indians managed to hold them back for four hours, but the Chinese used weight of numbers to break through. Most Indian forces were withdrawn to established positions in Walong, while a company supported by mortars and medium machine guns remained to cover the retreat.

Elsewhere, Chinese troops launched a three-pronged attack on Tawang, which the Indians evacuated without any resistance.

Over the following days, there were clashes between Indian and Chinese patrols at Walong as the Chinese rushed in reinforcements. On 25 October, the Chinese made a probe, which was met with resistance from the 4th Sikhs. The following day, a patrol from the 4th Sikhs was encircled, and after being unable to break the encirclement, an Indian unit was able to flank the Chinese, allowing the Sikhs to break free.

=== Western theatre ===
The map shows the Indian and Chinese claims of the border in the Aksai Chin region, the Macartney-MacDonald line, the Foreign Office Line, as well as the progress of Chinese forces as they occupied areas during the Sino-Indian War.

On the Aksai Chin front, China already controlled most of the disputed territory. Chinese forces quickly swept the region of any remaining Indian troops. Late on 19 October, Chinese troops launched a number of attacks throughout the western theatre. By 22 October, all posts north of Chushul had been cleared.

On 20 October, the Chinese easily took the Chip Chap Valley and Pangong Lake. Many outposts and garrisons along the Western front were unable to defend against the surrounding Chinese troops. Most Indian troops positioned in these posts offered resistance but were either killed or taken prisoner. Indian support for these outposts was not forthcoming, as evidenced by the Galwan post, which had been surrounded by enemy forces in August, but no attempt made to relieve the besieged garrison. Following the 20 October attack, nothing was heard from Galwan.

On 24 October, Indian forces fought hard to hold the Rezang La Ridge, in order to prevent a nearby airstrip from falling.

After realising the magnitude of the attack, the Indian Western Command withdrew many of the isolated outposts to the south-east. Daulet Beg Oldi was also evacuated, but it was south of the Chinese claim line and was not approached by Chinese forces. Indian troops were withdrawn in order to consolidate and regroup in the event that China probed south of their claim line.

== Lull in the fighting ==
By 24 October, the PLA had entered territory previously administered by India to give the PRC a diplomatically strong position over India. The majority of Chinese forces had advanced 16 kilometres (9.9 mi) south of the control line prior to the conflict. Four days of fighting were followed by a three-week lull. Zhou ordered the troops to stop advancing as he attempted to negotiate with Nehru. The Indian forces had retreated into more heavily fortified positions around Se La and Bomdi La which would be difficult to assault. Zhou sent Nehru a letter, proposing

1. A negotiated settlement of the boundary
2. That both sides disengage and withdraw 20 kilometres (12 mi) from present lines of actual control
3. A Chinese withdrawal north in NEFA
4. That China and India not cross lines of present control in Aksai Chin.

Nehru's 27 October reply expressed interest in the restoration of peace and friendly relations and suggested a return to the "boundary prior to 8 September 1962". He was categorically concerned about a mutual 20 kilometres (12 mi) withdrawal after "40 or 60 kilometres (25 or 40 miles) of blatant military aggression". He wanted the creation of a larger immediate buffer zone and thus resist the possibility of a repeat offensive. Zhou's 4 November reply repeated his 1959 offer to return to the McMahon Line in NEFA and the Chinese traditionally claimed MacDonald Line in Aksai Chin.

Facing Chinese forces maintaining themselves on Indian soil and trying to avoid political pressure, the Indian parliament announced a national emergency and passed a resolution which stated their intent to "drive out the aggressors from the sacred soil of India". The United States and the United Kingdom supported India's response. The Soviet Union was preoccupied with the Cuban Missile Crisis and did not offer the support it had provided in previous years. With the backing of other great powers, a 14 November letter by Nehru to Zhou once again rejected his proposal.

Neither side declared war, used their air force, or fully broke off diplomatic relations, but the conflict is commonly referred to as a war. However, India issued a proclamation of emergency which, constitutionally, is the Indian mechanism of declaring war. This war coincided with the Cuban Missile Crisis and was viewed by the western nations at the time as another act of aggression by the Communist bloc. According to Calvin, the Chinese side evidently wanted a diplomatic resolution and discontinuation of the conflict.

== Continuation of war ==
After Zhou received Nehru's letter (rejecting Zhou's proposal), the fighting resumed on the eastern theatre on 14 November (Nehru's birthday), with an Indian attack on Walong, claimed by China, launched from the defensive position of Se La and inflicting heavy casualties on the Chinese. The Chinese resumed military activity on Aksai Chin and NEFA hours after the Walong battle.

=== Continuation of Eastern theatre ===
In the eastern theatre, the PLA attacked Indian forces near Se La and Bomdi La on 17 November. These positions were defended by the Indian 4th Infantry Division. Instead of attacking by road as expected, PLA forces approached via a mountain trail, and their attack cut off a main road and isolated 10,000 Indian troops.

Se La occupied high ground, and rather than assault this commanding position, the Chinese captured Thembang, which was a supply route to Se La.

The PLA penetrated close to the outskirts of Tezpur, Assam, a major frontier town nearly 50 kilometres (31 mi) from the Assam-North-East Frontier Agency border. The local government ordered the evacuation of the civilians in Tezpur to the south of the Brahmaputra River, all prisons were thrown open, and government officials who stayed behind destroyed Tezpur's currency reserves in anticipation of a Chinese advance.

=== Continuation of Western theatre ===
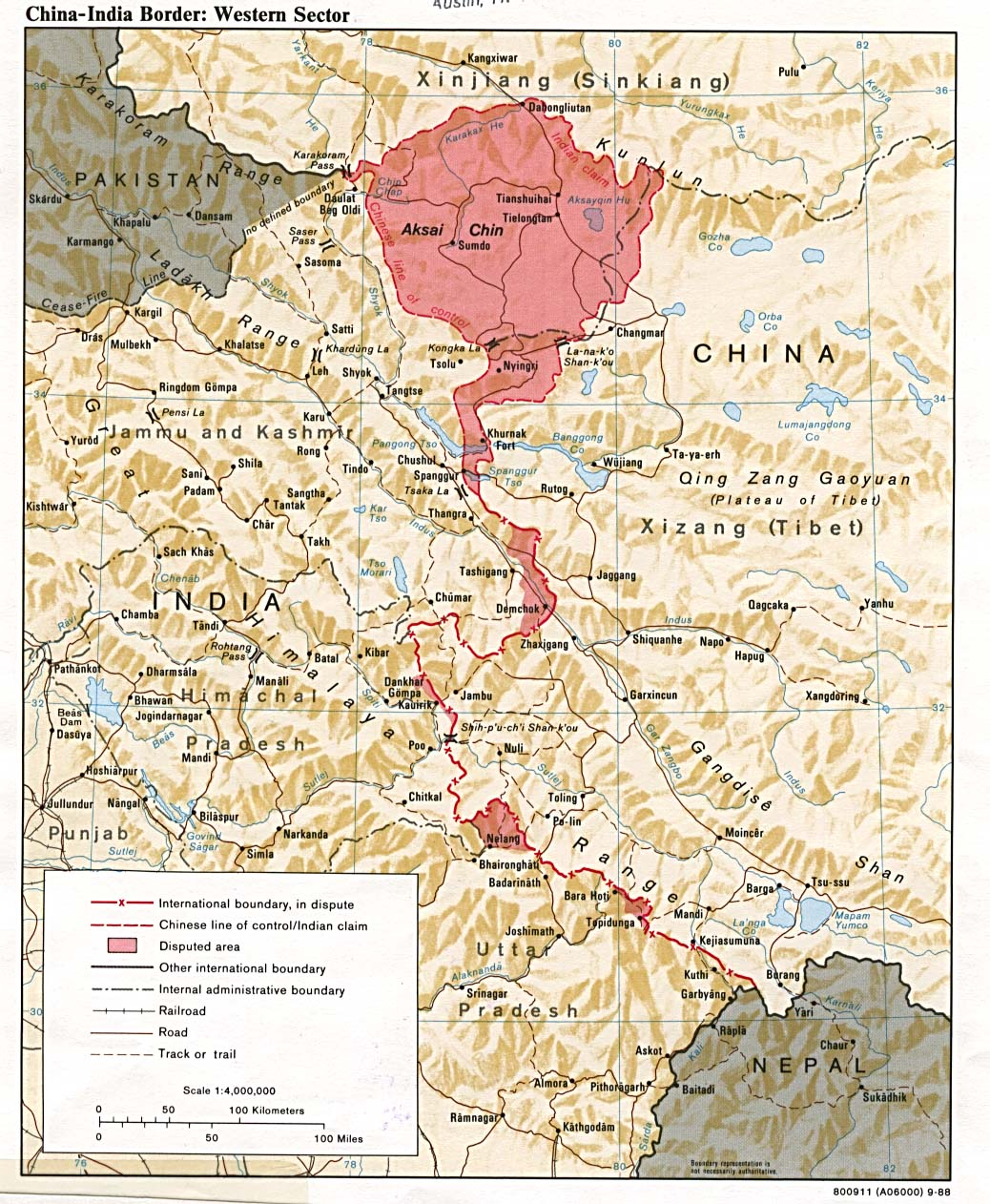
The disputed areas in the western sector, shown in a 1988 map from the CIA.

On the western theatre, PLA forces launched a heavy infantry attack on 18 November near Chushul. Their attack started at 4:35 am, despite a mist surrounding most of the areas in the region. At 5:45 the Chinese troops advanced to attack two platoons of Indian troops at Gurung Hill.

The Indians did not know what was happening, as communications were dead. As a patrol was sent, China attacked with greater numbers. Indian artillery could not hold off the superior Chinese forces. By 9:00 am, Chinese forces attacked Gurung Hill directly and Indian commanders withdrew from the area and also from the connecting Spangur Gap.

The Chinese had been simultaneously attacking Rezang La which was held by 123 Indian troops. At 5:05 am, Chinese troops launched their attack audaciously. Chinese medium machine gun fire pierced through the Indian tactical defences.

At 6:55 am the sun rose and the Chinese attack on the 8th platoon began in waves. Fighting continued for the next hour, until the Chinese signaled that they had destroyed the 7th platoon. Indians tried to use light machine guns on the medium machine guns from the Chinese but after 10 minutes the battle was over. Logistical inadequacy once again hurt the Indian troops. The Chinese gave the Indian troops a respectful military funeral. The battles also saw the death of Major Shaitan Singh of the Kumaon Regiment, who had been instrumental in the first battle of Rezang La. The Indian troops were forced to withdraw to high mountain positions. Indian sources believed that their troops were just coming to grips with the mountain combat and finally called for more troops. The Chinese declared a ceasefire, ending the bloodshed.

Indian forces suffered heavy casualties, with dead Indian troops' bodies being found in the ice, frozen with weapons in hand. The Chinese forces also suffered heavy casualties, especially at Rezang La. This signalled the end of the war in Aksai Chin as China had reached their claim line – many Indian troops were ordered to withdraw from the area. China claimed that the Indian troops wanted to fight on until the bitter end. The war ended with their withdrawal, so as to limit the number of casualties.

== Ceasefire ==
China had reached its claim lines so the PLA did not advance farther. On 19 November, Zhou Enlai declared a unilateral ceasefire to start on midnight, 21 November. Zhou's ceasefire declaration stated,

Beginning from 21 November 1962, the Chinese frontier guards will cease fire along the entire Sino-Indian border. Beginning from 1 December 1962, the Chinese frontier guards will withdraw to positions 20 kilometres (12 miles) behind the line of actual control which existed between China and India on 7 November 1959. In the eastern sector, although the Chinese frontier guards have so far been fighting on Chinese territory north of the traditional customary line, they are prepared to withdraw from their present positions to the north of the illegal McMahon Line, and to withdraw twenty kilometres (12 miles) back from that line. In the middle and western sectors, the Chinese frontier guards will withdraw twenty kilometres (12 miles) from the line of actual control.

Zhou had first given the ceasefire announcement to Indian chargé d'affaires on 19 November (before India's request for United States air support), but New Delhi did not receive it until 24 hours later. The aircraft carrier was ordered back after the ceasefire, and thus, American intervention on India's side in the war was avoided. Retreating Indian troops, who hadn't come into contact with anyone knowing of the ceasefire, and Chinese troops in NEFA and Aksai Chin, were involved in some minor battles, but for the most part, the ceasefire signalled an end to the fighting. The United States Air Force flew in supplies to India in November 1962, but neither side wished to continue hostilities.

After 1 December, Chinese forces began leaving Indian territories and returning to the old boundary.

Toward the end of the war India increased its support for Tibetan refugees and revolutionaries, some of them having settled in India, as they were fighting the same common enemy in the region. The Nehru administration ordered the raising of an elite Indian-trained "Tibetan Armed Force" composed of Tibetan refugees.

== International reactions ==
According to James Calvin, western nations at the time viewed China as an aggressor during the China–India border war, and saw the war as part of a monolithic communist objective for a world dictatorship of the proletariat. This was further triggered by Mao's statement that: "the way to world conquest lies through Havana, Accra and Calcutta". The United States was unequivocal in its recognition of the Indian boundary claims in the eastern sector, while not supporting the claims of either side in the western sector. Britain, on the other hand, agreed with the Indian position completely, with the foreign secretary stating, 'we have taken the view of the government of India on the present frontiers and the disputed territories belong to India.'

The Chinese military action has been viewed by the United States as part of the PRC's policy of making use of aggressive wars to settle its border disputes and to distract both its own population and international opinion from its internal issues. The Kennedy administration was disturbed by what they considered "blatant Chinese communist aggression against India". In a May 1963 National Security Council meeting, contingency planning on the part of the United States in the event of another Chinese attack on India was discussed and nuclear options were considered. After listening to advisers, Kennedy stated "We should defend India, and therefore we will defend India." By 1964, China had developed its own nuclear weapon which would have likely caused any American nuclear policy in defense of India to be reviewed.

The non-aligned nations remained mostly uninvolved, and only Egypt (officially the United Arab Republic) openly supported India. Of the non-aligned nations, six, Egypt, Burma, Cambodia, Sri Lanka, Ghana and Indonesia, met in Colombo on 10 December 1962. The proposals stipulated a Chinese withdrawal of 20 kilometres (12 mi) from the customary lines without any reciprocal withdrawal on India's behalf. The failure of these six nations to unequivocally condemn China deeply disappointed India.

Pakistan also shared a disputed boundary with China, and had proposed to India that the two countries adopt a common defence against "northern" enemies (i.e. China), which was rejected by India, citing nonalignment. In 1962, Pakistani president Muhammad Ayub Khan made clear to India that Indian troops could safely be transferred from the Pakistan frontier to the Himalayas. But, after the war, Pakistan improved its relations with China. It began border negotiations on 13 October 1962, concluding them in December. In 1963, the China-Pakistan Border Treaty was signed, as well as trade, commercial, and barter treaties. Pakistan conceded its northern claim line in Pakistani-controlled Kashmir to China in favour of a more southerly boundary along the Karakoram Range. The border treaty largely set the border along the MacCartney-Macdonald Line. India's military failure against China would embolden Pakistan to initiate the Second Kashmir War with India in 1965.

== Foreign involvement ==
During the conflict, Nehru wrote two letters on 19 November 1962 to U.S. President Kennedy, asking for 12 squadrons of fighter jets and a modern radar system. These jets were seen as necessary to beef up Indian air strength so that air-to-air combat could be initiated safely from the Indian perspective. Bombing troops was seen as unwise for fear of Chinese retaliatory action. Nehru also asked that these aircraft be manned by American pilots until Indian airmen were trained to replace them. These requests were rejected by the Kennedy Administration, which was involved in the Cuban Missile Crisis during most of the Sino-Indian War. The U.S. nonetheless provided non-combat assistance to Indian forces and planned to send the carrier USS Kitty Hawk to the Bay of Bengal to support India in case of an air war. Kennedy also warned Pakistan from taking advantage of the situation and attempting to invade Northern India.

As the Sino-Soviet split had already emerged, Moscow, while remaining formally neutral, made a major effort to render military assistance to India, especially with the sale of advanced MiG warplanes. The U.S. and Britain refused to sell these advanced weapons so India turned to the USSR. India and the USSR reached an agreement in August 1962 (before the Cuban Missile Crisis) for the immediate purchase of twelve MiG-21s as well as for Soviet technical assistance in the manufacture of these aircraft in India. According to P.R. Chari, "The intended Indian production of these relatively sophisticated aircraft could only have incensed Peking so soon after the withdrawal of Soviet technicians from China." In 1964, further Indian requests for American jets were rejected. However, Moscow offered loans, low prices and technical help in upgrading India's armaments industry. By 1964, India was a major purchaser of Soviet arms.

According to Indian diplomat G. Parthasarathy, "only after we got nothing from the US did arms supplies from the Soviet Union to India commence." India's favored relationship with Moscow continued into the 1980s, but ended after the collapse of Soviet Communism in 1991. In his memoirs, the then Soviet leader, Nikita Khrushchev, says: "I think Mao created the Sino-Indian conflict precisely in order to draw the Soviet Union into it. He wanted to put us in the position of having no choice but to support him. He wanted to be the one who decided what we should do. But Mao made a mistake in thinking we would agree to sacrifice our independence in foreign policy."

== Aftermath ==
=== China ===
According to China's official military history, the war achieved China's policy objectives of securing borders in its western sector, as China continued its de facto control of the Aksai Chin.

According to James Calvin, even though China won a military victory it lost in terms of its international image. China's first nuclear weapon test in October 1964 and its support of Pakistan in the 1965 India-Pakistan War tended to confirm the American view of communist world objectives, including Chinese influence over Pakistan.

Lora Saalman opined in a 2011 study of Chinese military publications, that while the war led to much blame, debates and acted as catalyst for the military modernisation of India, the war is now treated as basic reportage of facts with relatively diminished interest by Chinese analysts.

This changed during the 2017 Doklam crisis, when the Chinese official media made reference to the 1962 war in the context of renewed border tensions with India.

=== India ===
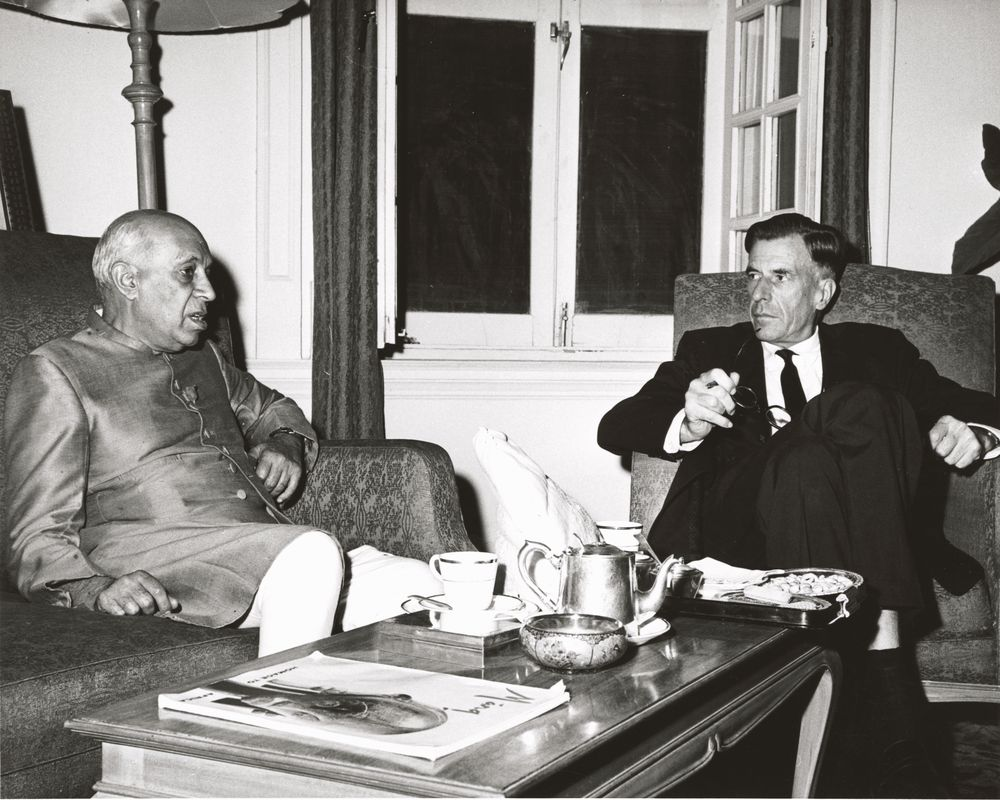
U.S. Ambassador to India John Kenneth Galbraith and Prime Minister Nehru conferring at the time of the conflict. This photograph was taken by the United States Information Service (USIS) and sent to President John F. Kennedy with a letter from Galbraith dated 9 November 1962.

The aftermath of the war saw sweeping changes in the Indian military to prepare it for similar conflicts in the future, and placed pressure on Nehru, who was seen as responsible for failing to anticipate the Chinese attack on India. Indians reacted with a surge in patriotism and memorials were erected for many of the Indian troops who died in the war. Arguably, the main lesson India learned from the war was the need to strengthen its own defences and a shift from Nehru's foreign policy with China based on his stated concept of "brotherhood". Because of India's inability to anticipate Chinese aggression, Nehru faced harsh criticism from government officials, for having promoted pacifist relations with China. Indian President Radhakrishnan said that Nehru's government was naive and negligent about preparations, and Nehru admitted "We had been living in a world of our own making". According to Inder Malhotra, a former editor of The Times of India and a commentator for The Indian Express, Indian politicians invested more effort in removing Defence Minister Krishna Menon than in actually waging war. Menon's favouritism weakened the Indian Army, and national morale dimmed. The public saw the war as a political and military debacle. Though the demand to deploy air force was raised, American envoy John Kenneth Galbraith and Indian intelligence officer B. N. Mullick had advised against the use of air force believing that the Chinese would bomb Indian cities in retaliation. India ultimately refrained from using the Indian Air Force as it lacked the defence equipments to counter Chinese retaliation. Indians in general became highly sceptical of China and its military. Many Indians view the war as a betrayal of India's attempts at establishing a long-standing peace with China and started to question the once popular "Hindi-Chini bhai-bhai" (meaning "Indians and Chinese are brothers"). The war also put an end to Nehru's earlier hopes that India and China would form a strong Asian Axis to counteract the increasing influence of the Cold War bloc superpowers.

The unpreparedness of the army was blamed on Defence Minister Menon, who resigned his government post to allow for someone who might modernise India's military. India's policy of weaponisation via indigenous sources and self-sufficiency was thus cemented. Sensing a weakened army, Pakistan, a close ally of China, began a policy of provocation against India by infiltrating Jammu and Kashmir and ultimately triggering the Second Kashmir War with India in 1965 and Indo-Pakistani war of 1971. The attack of 1965 was successfully stopped and ceasefire was negotiated under international pressure. In the Indo-Pakistani war of 1971 India won a clear victory, resulting in liberation of Bangladesh (formerly East-Pakistan).

As a result of the war, the Indian government commissioned an investigation, resulting in the classified Henderson Brooks–Bhagat Report on the causes of the war and the reasons for failure. India's performance in high-altitude combat in 1962 led to an overhaul of the Indian Army in terms of doctrine, training, organisation and equipment. Neville Maxwell claimed that the Indian role in international affairs after the border war was also greatly reduced after the war and India's standing in the non-aligned movement suffered. The Indian government has attempted to keep the Hendersen-Brooks-Bhagat Report secret for decades, although portions of it have recently been leaked by Neville Maxwell.

According to James Calvin, India gained many benefits from the 1962 conflict. This war united the country as never before. India got 32,000 square miles (8.3 million hectares, 83,000 km^{2}) of disputed territory even if it felt that NEFA was hers all along. The new Indian republic had avoided international alignments; by asking for help during the war, India demonstrated its willingness to accept military aid from several sectors. And, finally, India recognised the serious weaknesses in its army. It would more than double its military manpower in the next two years and it would work hard to resolve the military's training and logistic problems to later become the second-largest army in the world. India's efforts to improve its military posture significantly enhanced its army's capabilities and preparedness.

=== Internment and deportation of Chinese Indians ===
Soon after the end of the war, the Indian government passed the Defence of India Act in December 1962, permitting the "apprehension and detention in custody of any person [suspected] of being of hostile origin." The broad language of the act allowed for the arrest of any person simply for having a Chinese surname, Chinese ancestry or a Chinese spouse. The Indian government incarcerated thousands of Chinese-Indians in an internment camp in Deoli, Rajasthan, where they were held for years without trial. The last internees were not released until 1967. Thousands more Chinese-Indians were forcibly deported or coerced to leave India. Nearly all internees had their properties sold off or looted. Even after their release, the Chinese Indians faced many restrictions in their freedom. They could not travel freely until the mid-1990s.

=== Subsequent conflicts between India and China ===
India has also had some military conflicts with China after the 1962 war. In late 1967, there were two conflicts in which both countries clashed in Sikkim. These conflicts were dubbed the "Nathu La" and "Cho La" clashes respectively, in which advancing Chinese forces were forced to withdraw from Sikkim, then a protectorate of India and later a state of India after its annexation in 1975. In the 1987 Sino-Indian skirmish, both sides showed military restraint and it was a bloodless conflict. In 2017 the two countries once again were involved in a military standoff, in which several troops were injured. In 2020, soldiers were killed in skirmishes for the first time since the war ended. In 2022, dozens of Chinese and Indian soldiers were injured after a clash in Yangtse between both countries.

=== Impacts in Pakistan ===
After the Sino-Indian border war, Pakistan established close military and strategic relations with China and signed the Sino-Pakistan Agreement to delineate the Sino-Pakistan border.

In the aftermath of India's defeat the United States shipped arms to India, which prompted a cooling off in Pakistan-United States relations. The United States did not provide advance notice to Pakistan of the arms' shipment and ignored Pakistan's concerns that these arms might be used by India against Pakistan. Additionally, Ayub Khan was disappointed that Pakistan's decision not to take advantage of Indian vulnerabilities during its war with China was not rewarded with serious United States efforts in negotiations to settle the Kashmir dispute. Convinced that diplomatic solutions would not favor Pakistan, Pakistan launched Operation Gibraltar against India, which escalated to the Indo-Pakistani War of 1965, with results favoring India.

== Diplomatic process ==
In 1993 and 1996, the two sides signed the Sino-Indian Bilateral Peace and Tranquility Accords, agreements to maintain peace and tranquility along the Line of Actual Control. Ten meetings of a Sino-Indian Joint Working Group (SIJWG) and five of an expert group have taken place to determine where the LoAC lies, but little progress has occurred.

On 20 November 2006, Indian politicians from Arunachal Pradesh expressed their concern over Chinese military modernization and appealed to parliament to take a harder stance on the PRC following a military buildup on the border similar to that in 1962. Additionally, China's military aid to Pakistan as well is a matter of concern to the Indian public, as the two sides have engaged in various wars.

On 6 July 2006, the historic Silk Road passing through this territory via the Nathu La pass was reopened. Both sides have agreed to resolve the issues by peaceful means.

In October 2011, it was stated that India and China will formulate a border mechanism to handle different perceptions as to the Line of Actual Control and resume the bilateral army exercises between the Indian and Chinese army from early 2012.

== Military awards ==
Indian gallantry award winners from the army include 3 Param Vir Chakra awardees, 20 Maha Vir Chakra awardees and 67 Vir Chakra awardees. Indian Air Force personnel to get the award include 1 Maha Vir Chakra awardee and 8 Vir Chakra awardees.

Santu Jouharmal Shahaney, an IOFS officer, who served as the first Indian Director General Indian Ordnance Factories (DGOF). He was awarded Padma Shri in 1962, by the Government of India, in the Civil Service category, for his contributions during the war.

=== India ===
This along with the *, indicates posthumously presented awards.

Name	Award	Unit	Date of action	Conflict	Place of action	Citations
Dhan Singh Thapa	PVC	8 Gorkha Rifles	20 October 1962	Sino-Indian War	Pangong Lake, Ladakh, India	
Joginder Singh Sahnan	PVC	Sikh Regiment	23 October 1962*	Sino-Indian War	Tongpen La, NEFA, India	
Shaitan Singh	PVC	Kumaon Regiment	18 November 1962*	Sino-Indian War	Rezang La, Ladakh, India	
Jaswant Singh Rawat	MVC	4th Garhwal Rifles	17 November 1962*	Sino-Indian War	Nuranang Falls, NEFA, India	
Tapishwar Narain Raina	MVC	Kumaon Regiment	20 October 1962	Sino-Indian War	Chushul, Ladakh, India	
Jag Mohan Nath	MVC	General Duties (Pilot)	1962	Sino-Indian War		

== In popular culture ==
The old soldier broke in. "All the time they were quarreling with us these last two years over the boundary lines, they were planning. 'Our line is five thousand years old,' we said. 'Ours is eight thousand,' they said. Bitterness on both sides! But we never thought then that they would attack."

— Pearl S. Buck, Mandala

Pearl S. Buck's Mandala has an account of the war and the predicament of the Indian government and the army in the face of the better-equipped and organised Chinese forces. The central character in the novel, a Maharana of Mewar, has his son fighting the Chinese in the war and dies in the battle of Chushul. Australian author Jon Cleary wrote a novel set during the conflict, The Pulse of Danger (1966).

In 1963, against the backdrop of the Sino-Indian War, Lata Mangeshkar sang the patriotic song "Aye Mere Watan Ke Logo" (literally, "Oh, the People of My Country") in the presence of Nehru. The song, composed by C. Ramchandra and written by Pradeep, is said to have brought the Prime Minister to tears.

Depictions of the 1962 war in Indian cinema include: Haqeeqat (1964), Ratha Thilagam (1963), 1962: My Country Land (2016), Tubelight (2017), 72 Hours: Martyr Who Never Died (2019) based on the life of Jaswant Singh Rawat, Subedar Joginder Singh (2017) about soldier Joginder Singh. Paltan (2018) is based on the later 1967 Nathu La and Cho La clashes along the Sikkim border and is set just after 1962 war. Major Shaitan Singh Bhati is portrayed in the 2025 film release of 120 Bahadur.

1962: The War in the Hills is a 2021 Indian web series based on the Battle of Rezang La during the war. It released on Hotstar, with its release being advanced due to the 2020–2021 China–India skirmishes.

== See also ==
- Battle of Talas
- Chinese salami slicing strategy
- Dogra–Tibetan War
- China–India relations
- List of wars involving India
- Kushan Empire

== Bibliography ==
- Banerji, Arun Kumar (2007), "Borders", in Jayanta Kumar Ray (ed.), Aspects of India's International Relations, 1700 to 2000: South Asia and the World, Pearson Education India, pp. 173–256, ISBN 978-81-317-0834-7
- Calvin, James Bernard, "The China – India Border War" (Marine Corps Command and Staff College, 1984).
- Chakravorty, B.; Thapliyal, Uma Prasad (1995). Stories of heroism. New Delhi: Allied Publishers. ISBN 978-81-7023-516-3.
- Dai, Chaowu (2016), "From 'Hindi-Chini Bhai-Bhai' to 'international class struggle' against Nehru: China's India policy and the frontier dispute, 1950–62", Ibid, Taylor & Francis, pp. 68–84, ISBN 978-1-315-38893-9
- Das Gupta, Amit R.; Lüthi, Lorenz M., eds. (2016), The Sino-Indian War of 1962: New perspectives, Taylor & Francis, ISBN 978-1-315-38892-2
- Fisher, Margaret W.; Rose, Leo E.; Huttenback, Robert A. (1963), Himalayan Battleground: Sino-Indian Rivalry in Ladakh, Praeger – via archive.org
- Hoffmann, Steven A. (1990), India and the China Crisis, University of California Press, ISBN 978-0-520-06537-6
- Lamb, Alastair (1966), The Mc Mahon Line : A Study in the Relations between India, China and Tibet, 1904 to 1914, vol. 2, OCLC 468648584
- Lin, Hsiao-Ting (2004). "Boundary, sovereignty, and imagination: Reconsidering the frontier disputes between British India and Republican China, 1914–47". The Journal of Imperial and Commonwealth History. 32 (3): 25–47. doi:10.1080/0308653042000279650. ISSN 0308-6534.
- Lüthi, Lorenz M. (2016), "India's Relations with China, 1945–1974", Ibid, Taylor & Francis, pp. 29–47, ISBN 978-1-315-38893-9
- Maxwell, Neville (1970), India's China War, Pantheon Books, ISBN 978-0-394-47051-1
- Maxwell, Neville; Noorani, A. G. (1971). "India's Forward Policy". The China Quarterly. 45 (45). Cambridge University Press on behalf of the School of Oriental and African Studies: 157–163. doi:10.1017/S0305741000010481. JSTOR 651889. S2CID 153895462.
- Mehra, Parshotham (1991), ""John Lall, Aksai Chin and Sino-Indian Conflict" (Book review)", China Report, 27 (2): 147–154, doi:10.1177/000944559102700206, S2CID 153622885
- Mehra, Parshotam (1992), An "agreed" frontier: Ladakh and India's northernmost borders, 1846–1947, Oxford University Press, ISBN 978-0-19-562758-9
- Noorani, A. G. (1970). "India's Forward Policy, Book reviews of Himalayan Blunder: The Curtain-Raiser to the Sino-Indian War of 1962 by J. P. Dalvi; The Untold Story by B. M. Kaul; The Guilty Men of 1962 by D. R. Mankekar". The China Quarterly. 43 (July–September). Cambridge University Press: 136–141. doi:10.1017/S0305741000044805. JSTOR 652088. S2CID 153324884.
- Noorani, A.G. (2010), India–China Boundary Problem 1846–1947: History and Diplomacy, Oxford University Press India, doi:10.1093/acprof:oso/9780198070689.001.0001, ISBN 978-0-19-908839-3
- Palace, Wendy (1995), Losing Face: the British foreign service and the question of Tibet 1904–1922 (PDF), Durham E-Theses, Durham University
- Palit, D. K. (1991), War in High Himalaya: The Indian Army in Crisis, 1962, C. Hurst & Co. Publishers, ISBN 978-1-85065-103-1
- Raghavan, Srinath (2010), War and Peace in Modern India, Palgrave Macmillan, ISBN 978-1-137-00737-7
- Snedden, Christopher (2015), Understanding Kashmir and Kashmiris, Oxford University Press, ISBN 978-1-84904-342-7
- Van Eekelen, Willem Frederik (2013), Indian Foreign Policy and the Border Dispute with China, Springer, ISBN 978-94-017-6555-8
- Warikoo, K., ed. (2009), Himalayan Frontiers of India: Historical, Geo-Political and Strategic Perspectives, Routledge, ISBN 978-1-134-03294-5
- Karim, Afsir (2009), "Strategic dimensions of the trans-Himalayan frontiers", Ibid, Routledge, pp. 56–66, ISBN 978-1-134-03294-5
- Warikoo, K. (2009), "India's gateway to Central Asia: trans-Himalayan trade and cultural movements through Kashmir and Ladakh, 1846–1947", Ibid, Routledge, pp. 1–13, ISBN 978-1-134-03294-5
- Woodman, Dorothy (1970) [first published in 1969 by Barrie & Rockliff, The Cresset Press], Himalayan Frontiers: A Political Review of British, Chinese, Indian, and Russian Rivalries, Praeger
- Wortzel, Larry M. (July 2003), "Concentrating Forces and Audacious Action: PLA lessons from the Sino-Indian War" ( (PDF)), in Laurie Burkitt; Andrew Scobell; Larry M. Wortzel. (eds.), The Lessons of History: The Chinese people's Liberation Army at 75, Strategic Studies Institute, pp. 340–341, ISBN 978-1-58487-126-2, archived from the original on 5 February 2012
