= Mandala (novel) =

1970 novel by Pearl S. Buck

- First edition
- Author: Pearl S. Buck
- Language: English
- Genre: Historical novel
- Publisher: John Day
- Publication date: 1970
- Publication place: United States

Mandala: A Novel of India is a novel written by Pearl S. Buck in 1970.

Centering her story around a princely family of the New India, Buck explores the mysticism that pervades everyday life there. It is unusual among this author's novels, which are most often set in China or the U.S.
