= Battle of Rezang La =

Battle of the 1962 Sino-Indian War

Battle of Rezang La Battle of No.8 & 9 Indian Posts in Ngari Chinese: 阿印8、9据点战斗
- Part of Sino-Indian War and Battle of Bangongluo
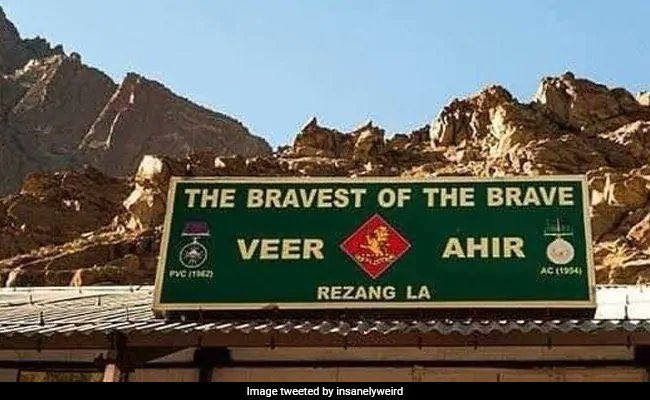
- Indian memorial for the battle at Rezang La
Date	18 November 1962
Location	Rezang La, Ladakh, India
Result	Chinese victory

Belligerents
India	China

Commanders and leaders
Major Shaitan Singh †	Lt.Col. Gao Huanchang

Units involved
C Company, 13th Battalion	3rd Battalion, 11th Infantry Regiment (Reinforced) (Note: The reinforcing elements include: 9th Rifle Company, 10th Infantry Regiment; Sapper Company, 11th Infantry Regiment; Flamethrower platoon, 4th Infantry Division; 1 X Platoon of "No.5 checkpoint of Ngari Border Defense detachment"; 2 X Batteries of 120mm mortar battery; 1 X Detachment of 75mm recoilless guns (4 guns, reinforced from 10th Infantry Regiment); 1 X Platoon of 57mm recoilless guns (3 guns, reinforced from 3rd Cavalry Regiment); 1 X Anti-air machinegun crew)

Strength
Indian source: ~120 soldiers Chinese source: 140-150 soldiers	600-640 soldiers

Casualties and losses
Indian source: 114 killed Chinese source: 136 killed 5 captured	Chinese source: 21 killed 98 wounded Indian source: 1,400 killed

The Battle of Rezang La, known in Chinese military history as the Battle of No. 8 and No. 9 Indian Posts in Ngari (Chinese: 阿印8、9号据点之战), was fought on 18 November 1962 during the Sino-Indian War, in the Chushul sector of Ladakh. It was a major engagement of the Battle of Bangongluo (Chinese: 班公洛之战), in which Chinese forces attacked Indian positions defended by C Company of the 13th Battalion, Kumaon Regiment, under Major Shaitan Singh. Singh was killed in action during the battle and was posthumously awarded the Param Vir Chakra.

== Battle ==
The Battle of Rezang La, known in the Chinese military history as the Battle of the Indian Posts No. 8 and No. 9, took place on 18 November 1962. The Indian position was defended by C Company of the 13th Battalion, Kumaon Regiment, commanded by Major Shaitan Singh. Indian accounts generally describe the defending force as comprising approximately 120 soldiers, while the Chinese military history records 142 personnel at the position, including supporting elements. The Indian position was divided among several strongpoints, with the company headquarters located near "Hill 5150". The terrain prevented effective artillery support from the Indian side.

According to the Chinese military history, the attacking force was centred on the reinforced 3rd Battalion of the 11th Infantry Regiment, with the 9th Rifle Company, 10th Infantry Regiment, and additional artillery, engineer and other supporting elements attached. The force was organised into two groups, which approached the Indian positions from the south and north during the night of 17–18 November. The southern group, comprising the 7th and 8th Companies, moved towards the southern positions, while the northern group used a separate approach to reach the area around Hill 5580 and manoeuvre against the Indian strongpoints. The Chinese account describes the deployment as an attempt to attack the positions from different directions and restrict the defenders' ability to withdraw or reinforce one another.

The Chinese account records that an Indian patrol approached the Chinese assembly area at approximately 7:30 a.m. on 18 November. After a brief exchange of fire, the Chinese force began its main attack at approximately 9:15 a.m., following artillery bombardment. The 7th Company attacked No. 9 post, encountering obstacles and fortified positions. Chinese troops used supporting weapons, including recoilless guns, as well as engineers and demolition equipment, to overcome the defences. The Chinese source states that the company destroyed numerous bunkers and captured the position after sustained fighting.

The 8th Rifle Company attacked the central position around Hill 5150, while the northern group attacked strongpoint No. 8. The Chinese account describes fighting around individual bunkers and the use of supporting fire from recoilless guns. It also records an attack against an Indian artillery position, where the initial advance encountered difficulties because of the terrain and exposure to defensive fire. The Chinese history states that the attacking troops eventually captured the strongpoints and the associated positions after approximately one hour and forty minutes of fighting. It records 136 Indian personnel killed and five captured in the engagement.

Indian accounts describe the defence as a prolonged and determined resistance by C Company against repeated Chinese assaults. They report that the defenders repelled successive attacks despite suffering casualties, losing communications and facing ammunition shortages. Some Indian accounts describe as many as eight assault waves and a final stage of close combat after the Chinese forces penetrated the position.

== Aftermath ==
Major Shaitan Singh was killed during the battle and was posthumously awarded the Param Vir Chakra, India's highest military decoration. The engagement is sometimes described as a notable example of a last stand in modern warfare. Despite minor numerical discrepancies, both countries' accounts describe the Indian company as having suffered extremely heavy losses and the Chinese forces as having captured the positions.

Estimates of Chinese casualties differ much more sharply. Some Indian accounts claim that more than 1,000 Chinese soldiers were killed, with figures of approximately 1,300 or 1,400 appearing in Indian narratives. Chinese military history records 21 killed and 98 wounded among the attacking units covered by its account.

As the fight at Rezang La went on concurrently, Battle of Gurung Hill took place, where both sides claimed victory. Battles of Rezang La and Gurung Hill were collectively known as Battle of Banggongluo in Chinese narrative.

== Legacy ==
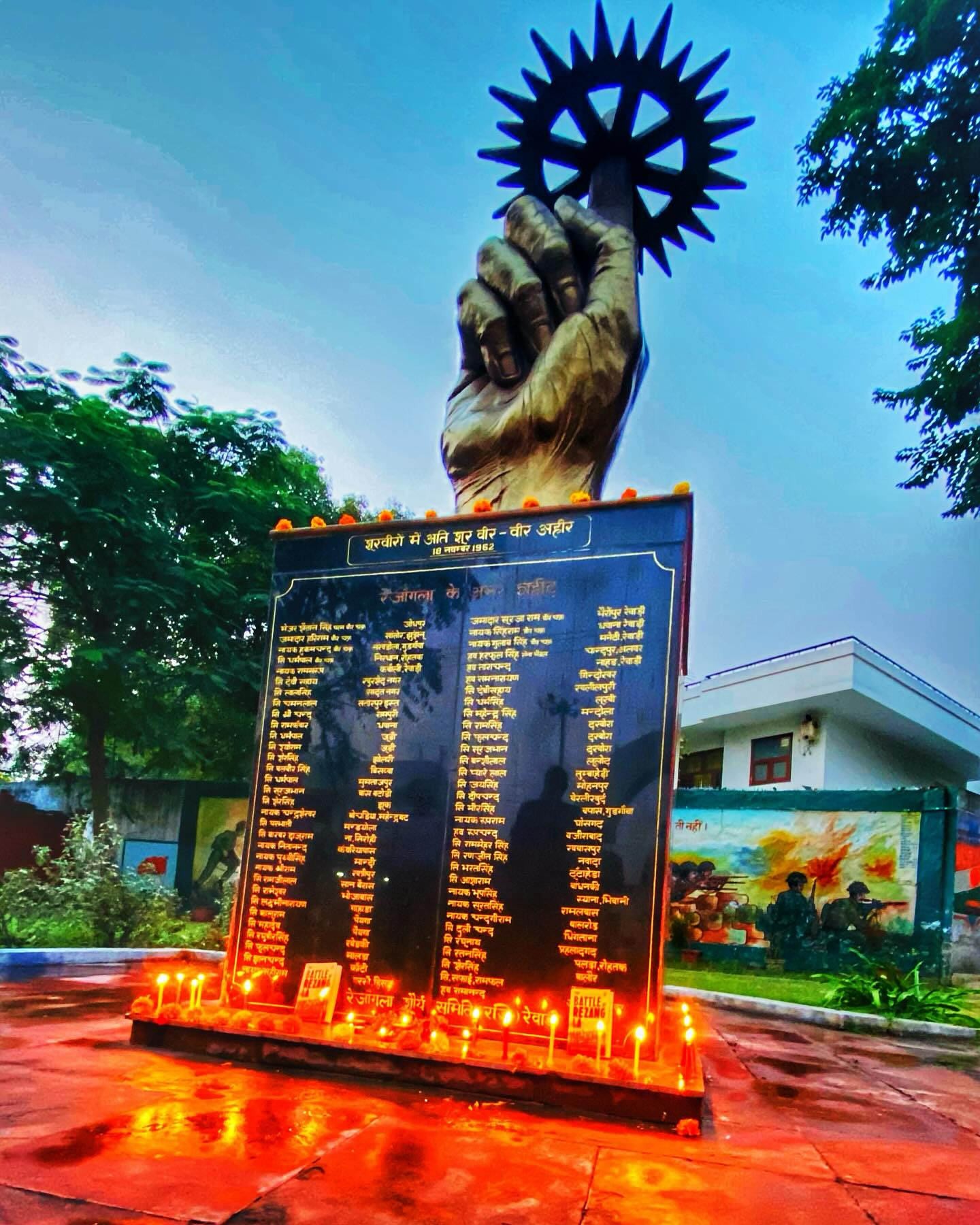
Rezang La memorial at Rewari.

The Battle of Rezang La remains a symbol of Indian courage and determination. Memorials have been erected at Rezang La and at various places in India to commemorate the bravery of the soldiers who fought and died in the battle. Rezang La Memorial in Chushul was constructed in 1963 to commemorate the Indian military.

In 2012, on the 50th anniversary of the battle, veterans and military historians gathered to pay tribute to the fallen soldiers, and the battle continues to be studied as a lesson in mountain warfare.

How can a man die better,

than facing fearful odds,

for the ashes of his fathers,

and temples of his gods.

This inscription also appears on the Rezang La Memorial at Rewari.

== See also ==
- Battle of Bum La Pass
- Battle of Walong
- Battle of Gurung Hill
