= Navy Children School =

Network of Indian Navy-affiliated schools in India

- Abbreviation: NCS
- Formation: 2 August 1965; 61 years ago
- Type: School system
- Region served: India
- Parent organisation: Navy Education Society
- Affiliations: Central Board of Secondary Education
- Website: nesnavy.in

Navy Children School (NCS) is a network of co-educational schools in India administered by the Navy Education Society (NES) for children of serving and retired Indian Navy personnel and other eligible students.

The network traces its origins to the establishment of the first naval school at New Delhi on 2 August 1965.

Navy Children Schools follow the curriculum of the Central Board of Secondary Education (CBSE). Individual schools range from primary or middle-school institutions to senior secondary schools offering education through Class XII.

As of 2026, the Navy Education Society officially lists 14 Navy Children Schools across India, including two separate schools in Visakhapatnam.

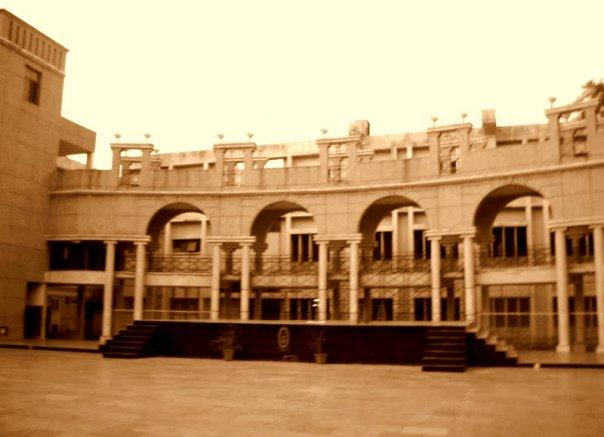
Navy Children School, Delhi, the oldest institution associated with the NCS network.

== History ==
The roots of the Navy Children School system date to 2 August 1965, when a school for children of naval personnel was established in Chanakyapuri, New Delhi.

The Delhi institution initially operated as a primary school and subsequently developed into a full senior secondary school.

As Indian naval establishments expanded around the country, similar schools were established at major naval stations.

The schools came under the administrative framework of the Navy Education Society, a registered society associated with the Directorate of Naval Education at Naval Headquarters.

The Navy Education Society states that its principal purpose is the promotion of education, science, culture, literature and fine arts among children and families of serving and retired naval personnel.

The school network was historically known by names including Naval School and Naval Public School at various stations.

In 2005, schools using the Naval Public School designation were redesignated as Navy Children Schools.

For example, the Sri Vijaya Nagar school in Visakhapatnam, which began as a Naval Kindergarten in 1978, records that it was redesignated as Navy Children School in 2005.

== Navy Education Society ==
The Navy Education Society is the central educational body responsible for coordinating Navy Children Schools.

It is registered under the Societies Registration Act, 1860 and has its registered office at the Directorate of Naval Education in New Delhi.

The society develops common educational and administrative policies for naval schools and works with individual school management committees at naval stations.

Its stated objectives include:

- maintaining common academic standards across Naval Schools;
- enabling easier transfer of students when naval personnel are posted to different stations;
- professional development of teachers;
- development of modern educational infrastructure;
- alignment with national education policy;
- promotion of sport and co-curricular activities; and
- development of creativity, teamwork, integrity and analytical skills.

The society also administers a separate network of Naval Kindergartens at naval establishments across India.

== Schools ==
As of 2026, the Navy Education Society lists the following 14 Navy Children Schools:

No.	School	Location	State / union territory
1	Navy Children School, Delhi	New Delhi	Delhi
2	Navy Children School Goa	Dabolim	Goa
3	Navy Children School Kochi	Kochi	Kerala
4	Navy Children School Mumbai	Navy Nagar, Mumbai	Maharashtra
5	Navy Children School Port Blair	Port Blair	Andaman and Nicobar Islands
6	Navy Children School Visakhapatnam – Nausena Baugh	Visakhapatnam	Andhra Pradesh
7	Navy Children School Visakhapatnam – Sri Vijaya Nagar	Visakhapatnam	Andhra Pradesh
8	Navy Children School Arakkonam	Arakkonam	Tamil Nadu
9	Navy Children School Coimbatore	Coimbatore	Tamil Nadu
10	Navy Children School Ezhimala	Ezhimala	Kerala
11	Navy Children School Karwar	Karwar	Karnataka
12	Navy Children School Porbandar	Porbandar	Gujarat
13	Navy Children School Karanja	Karanja	Maharashtra
14	Navy Children School Okha	Okha	Gujarat

=== Delhi ===
Navy Children School Delhi is the oldest school associated with the network.

It was established on 2 August 1965 and is located at the Naval Complex on Satya Marg in Chanakyapuri, New Delhi.

The school provides education through Class XII and is affiliated with CBSE.

=== Mumbai ===
Navy Children School Mumbai is located at Navy Nagar in Colaba.

The institution was founded in 1984 and its main school building was commissioned in November 1989. It provides education from Balvatika through Class XII.

The school is administered locally by Headquarters Western Naval Command under the Navy Education Society.

=== Visakhapatnam ===
Visakhapatnam, headquarters of the Eastern Naval Command, has two separately administered Navy Children Schools.

==== Nausena Baugh ====
Navy Children School, Nausena Baugh, operates at Gandhigram in Visakhapatnam.

The school is a large senior-secondary institution and reported more than 3,300 students during the 2025–26 academic year.

==== Sri Vijaya Nagar ====
Navy Children School, Sri Vijaya Nagar, originated on 24 October 1978 as a Naval Kindergarten serving families living in the 104 Area naval community.

It later expanded into a senior secondary school and was redesignated as Navy Children School in 2005.

=== Porbandar ===
Navy Children School Porbandar was commissioned on 14 January 2016 at INS Sardar Patel.

It provides education through Class XII and operates under the Navy Education Society.

=== Coimbatore ===
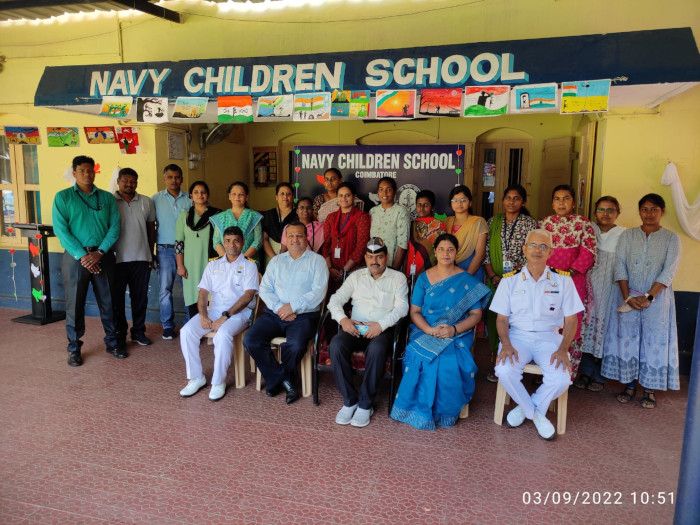
Yogendra Singh Yadav, recipient of the Param Vir Chakra, interacting with students of Navy Children School Coimbatore in 2022.

Navy Children School Coimbatore operates at INS Agrani.

The school provides education for children of naval personnel stationed in the Coimbatore area.

In September 2022, Param Vir Chakra recipient Honorary Captain Yogendra Singh Yadav addressed students at the school during an interactive session organised by the Indian Navy.

== Academics ==
Navy Children Schools follow the Central Board of Secondary Education curriculum.

The individual schools maintain their own CBSE affiliation numbers and administrative structures, while the Navy Education Society promotes common educational policies throughout the network.

The network's curriculum and school-development policies have increasingly been aligned with the National Education Policy 2020.

At its 2025 annual conference, the society identified standardisation across Naval Schools, faculty development, infrastructure modernisation and implementation of NEP 2020 among its priorities.

== Uniformity across the network ==
A major purpose of the NCS system is to provide continuity of education to children whose parents may be transferred between naval establishments.

The Navy Education Society states that it seeks to maintain a uniform and balanced curriculum and common academic standards across Naval Schools so that students can transition between schools with less disruption.

At the 2025 Navy Education Society conference, the chairperson similarly emphasised uniformity across the school network in order to provide a seamless educational environment for children of naval personnel.

== Co-curricular education ==
Individual Navy Children Schools provide a range of sporting, cultural, scientific and leadership activities.

Common activities across the network include:

- athletics and team sports;
- debating and public speaking;
- music and performing arts;
- science and technology activities;
- student councils;
- Model United Nations programmes;
- environmental activities; and
- interaction with members and veterans of the armed forces.

The Navy Education Society presents annual academic awards and rolling trophies to schools demonstrating high academic performance.

== Navy Education Society conferences ==
The Navy Education Society holds an annual conference bringing together school principals, naval officers and educational administrators from across the NCS network.

The conference includes meetings of the:

- Executive Committee;
- Management Advisory Committee; and
- Academic Advisory Committee.

In 2022, representatives from all then-13 Navy Children Schools participated in the annual conference at the Indian Naval Academy at Ezhimala.

By 2026, the NES website listed 14 Navy Children Schools, reflecting the separate listing of the two Visakhapatnam schools.

The 2025 conference was held at Eastern Naval Command headquarters in Visakhapatnam and focused on implementation of NEP 2020, standardisation, infrastructure development and faculty training.

== Inclusive education ==
The Navy Education Society also supports educational initiatives for children with special educational needs.

At the 2025 NES conference, representatives of Sankalp Schools participated for the first time. These institutions provide education, pre-vocational training and life-skills development for children with special needs from the naval community.

== Naval Kindergartens ==
In addition to Navy Children Schools, the Navy Education Society oversees a separate network of Naval Kindergartens at naval stations across India.

Current locations listed by NES include:

- Chilka
- Mandovi
- Dronacharya
- Hamla
- Shivaji
- Kochi
- Vijay Baugh
- Minnie Bay
- Karanja
- Parundu
- Colaba
- T. S. Mahul
- Vasco
- Kalinga
- Adyar
- Pallava
- Kattabomman
- Mankhurd
- Karwar
- Amdalli
- Ghatkopar

== Gallery ==
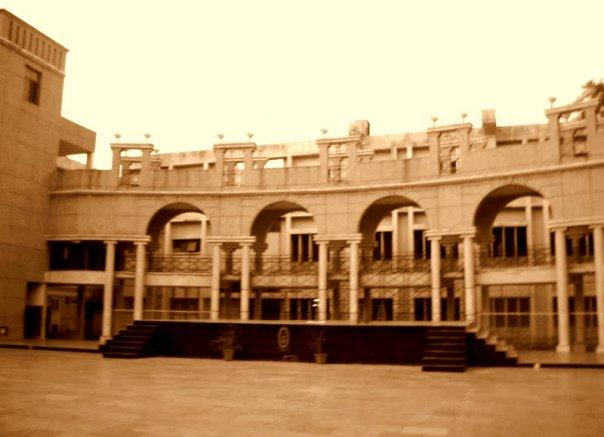
Navy Children School, Delhi

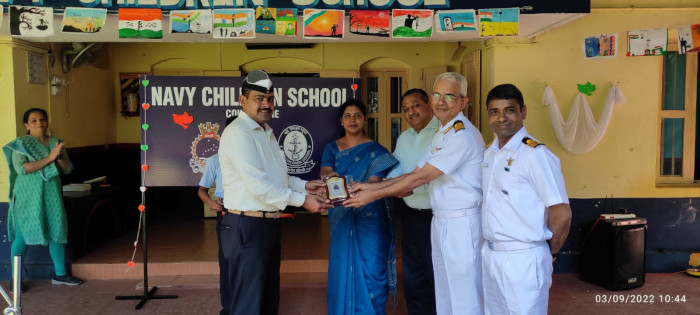
Yogendra Singh Yadav interacting with NCS Coimbatore students

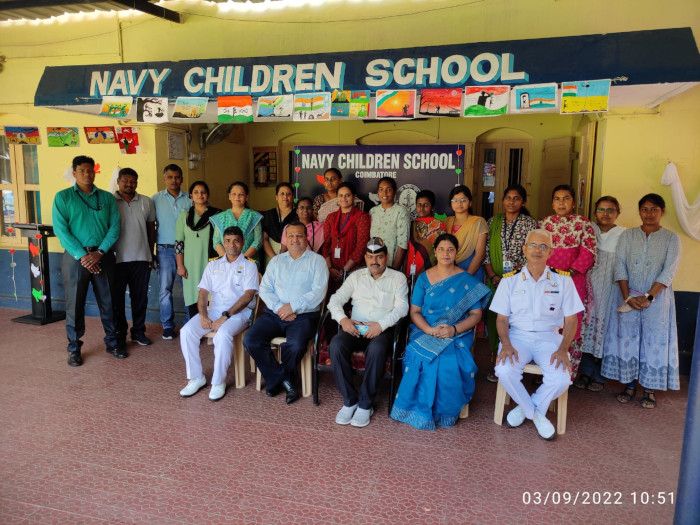
Interactive session at Navy Children School Coimbatore

== See also ==
- Navy Education Society
- Indian Navy
- Navy Children School, Delhi
- Navy Children School Kochi
- Army Welfare Education Society
- Indian Army Public Schools
- The Air Force School (Subroto Park)
- Central Board of Secondary Education
