= Balwan Singh =

Recipient of Maha Vir Chakra

Colonel Balwan Singh MVC
- Born: 17 October 1973 (age 52); Sasroli, Jhajjar district, Haryana, India
- Military career
- Allegiance: India
- Branch: Indian Army
- Service years: 1999-present
- Rank: Colonel
- Service number: IC-56218
- Unit: 18 Grenadiers
- Conflicts: Kargil War: Battle of Tiger Hill
- Awards: Maha Vir Chakra

Colonel Balwan Singh Panghal MVC (born 17 October 1973) is a decorated Indian Army officer who was awarded the Maha Vir Chakra for his courage in leading the successful assault to capture Tiger Hill during the 1999 Kargil War.

== Early life ==
A second-generation soldier, Singh was inspired to join the Indian Army by his father Shobha Chand, a decorated veteran of the 2nd Jat Battalion. After completing his senior secondary education from Sainik School, Karnal, Singh joined University College, Rohtak and following graduation entered the Officers Training Academy (OTA) Chennai. In March 1999, he received a short-service commission in the 18 Grenadiers, with the service number SS-37691.

== Kargil War and capture of Tiger Hill ==
With just four months of service when the Kargil War broke out, Singh was tasked to lead his Ghatak Platoon in an attempt to capture Tiger Hill during the eponymous battle. Before leading his troops into action, Singh vowed "Tiger Hill pe Tiranga fahrake ayenge, chahe kuchh bhi ho jaye." ("We will hoist the Tricolour atop Tiger Hill, come what may.")

For his inspirational leadership and courage in successfully capturing the peak, Singh was awarded the Maha Vir Chakra by President K. R. Narayan on Independence Day 1999. The official citation for the decoration reads as follows:

LIEUTENANT BALWAN SINGH (SS-37691), 18 GRENADIERS

On 03 July 1999 Lieutenant Balwan Singh with his Ghatak platoon was tasked to assault the 'Tiger Hill Top' from the North Eastern direction as part of a multi pronged attack. The route to the objective situated at a height of 16,500 feet was snowbound and interspersed with crevasses and sheer falls. The officer, with just three months service, set about his task with single-minded determination. The team led and exhorted by him, moved for over twelve hours along a very difficult and precarious route and under intense artillery shelling to reach the designated spur.

This move took the enemy by complete surprise as his team used cliff assault mountaineering equipment to reach the top with stealth. On seeing the Ghataks, the enemy panicked and in a desperate firefight attempted to repulse the Ghataks. In the ensuing firefight, Lieutenant Balwan Singh was himself seriously injured. However his resolve to finish the enemy remained unshaken. He refused to be evacuated and unmindful of his injury, moved swiftly to encircle the enemy and engaged them in close combat and single handedly killed four enemy soldiers. The remaining enemy personnel opted to flee rather than face the fury of the fierce officer. His inspirational leadership, conspicuous courage and bravery were instrumental in the capture of Tiger Hill, which was operationally one of the most important objectives in the Drass sector.

== Subsequent career ==
After the conflict, Singh was granted a regular commission with the service number IC-56218. In 2001, he participated in the United Nations Mission in Sierra Leone (UNAMSIL). He was promoted to captain on 6 November 2003 and to major on 6 November 2005. He was an instructor in the Indian Military Academy, Dehradun, and has also served as Group Testing Officer at the Services Selection Board, Allahabad.

Promoted to lieutenant-colonel on 6 November 2012, and to colonel (by selection) on 6 November 2014 (seniority from 5 March 2014), Singh eventually became the CO of 18 Grenadiers, commanding his battalion at Gwalior and on the Siachen Glacier. As of 2018, he is the Colonel General Staff at PH & HP Independent Sub Area Ambala.

== Awards and decorations ==

| Maha Vir Chakra | Wound Medal | Special Service Medal | Operation Vijay Star | |
| Siachen Glacier Medal | Operation Vijay | Operation Parakram Medal | Sainya Seva Medal | High Altitude Service Medal |
| Videsh Seva Medal | 20 Years Long Service Medal | 9 Years Long Service Medal | UNOMSIL Medal | |
