= Mahieka Sharma =

Indian actress and model

- Born: February 19, 2001 (age 25); New Delhi, India
- Citizenship: Indian
- Education: Pandit Deendayal Energy University (Bachelor's degree in Economics and Finance); University of Maryland (Community Psychology); The Yoga Institute (Yoga teacher training)
- Occupations: Model, actress
- Years active: 2020–present

Mahieka Sharma (born 19 February 2001) is an Indian fashion model and actress. She has worked in advertising campaigns for brands including Tanishq, Vivo, and Uniqlo, and has walked the runway for designers including Manish Malhotra, Sabyasachi Mukherjee, Tarun Tahiliani, and Anita Dongre. In 2024, she received the Model of the Year (New Age) award at the Indian Fashion Awards.

== Early life and education ==
Sharma was born and raised in New Delhi, India. She attended Navy Children School before earning a bachelor's degree in Economics and Finance from Pandit Deendayal Energy University in 2022. During her university years, she played basketball for the institution's team. Following her graduation, she completed a one-year course in Community Psychology at the University of Maryland. Sharma is also a certified yoga instructor.

== Career ==
=== Modeling ===
Sharma began her modelling career by participating in local pageants and commercial assignments in Delhi and Gujarat while she was a student. Following her education, she pursued modelling professionally. She has walked the runway at fashion events including Lakmé Fashion Week and India Couture Week for designers such as Manish Malhotra, Sabyasachi Mukherjee, Anita Dongre, Tarun Tahiliani, Ritu Kumar, and Amit Aggarwal. Sharma appeared in a bridal campaign by Sabyasachi Mukherjee.

In 2024, she received the Model of the Year (New Age) award at the Indian Fashion Awards. She has appeared in editorial features and on digital covers of magazines including Elle India and Grazia India. Sharma has also worked in advertising campaigns for brands including Tanishq, Vivo India, Uniqlo, and Kama Ayurveda.

=== Acting ===
In addition to modelling, Sharma has appeared in commercials, music videos, and screen projects. She appeared in the biographical film PM Narendra Modi (2019), directed by Omung Kumar and starring Vivek Oberoi. She has also been involved with the documentary film Into the Dusk, directed by Orlando von Einsiedel.

=== Public profile ===
Sharma has received media coverage for her work in fashion and appearances at industry events. In 2025, she was also the subject of media reports concerning her reported relationship with Indian cricketer Hardik Pandya.

== Awards and recognition ==
- 2024: Model of the Year (New Age), Indian Fashion Awards.
- 2024: GQ India's India's Next Supermodel list.
- 2025: Femina’s Fab List.
- 2025: GQ India's The Defining Face of Indian Fashion Runway 2025 list.
- 2025: LSA's 50 Icons of Influence 2025 list.
- 2025: ELLE India's Model of the Season.

== Personal life ==
In 2025, media outlets reported on Sharma's relationship with cricketer Hardik Pandya.
