= Ghatak Platoon =

Indian Military Units

Ghatak Forces
- Country: India
- Branch: Indian Army
- Type: Commando
- Size: 7,000

Ghatak Platoons (Also referred to as Ghatak Force) are special operations capable platoons present in every infantry battalion of the Indian Army. Ghatak is a Sanskrit word meaning "killer" or "lethal". Their name was given to them by General Bipin Chandra Joshi. They act as shock troops and spearhead assaults ahead of the battalion.

== Role ==
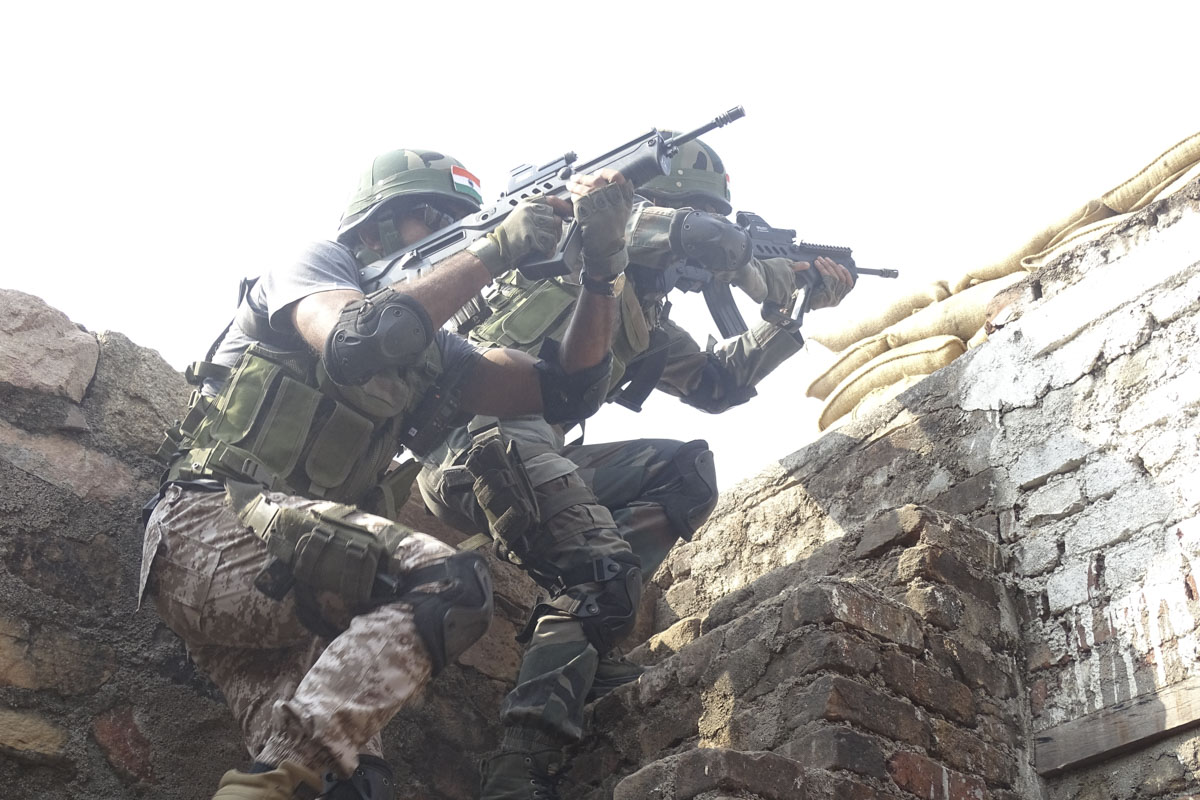
Ghatak platoon commandos.

They can be tasked by the battalion or brigade commander to carry out tasks such as special reconnaissance, raids on enemy artillery positions, airfields, supply dumps and tactical headquarters or other special operations at a tactical level. They are also capable of directing artillery and air attacks on targets deep within enemy lines.

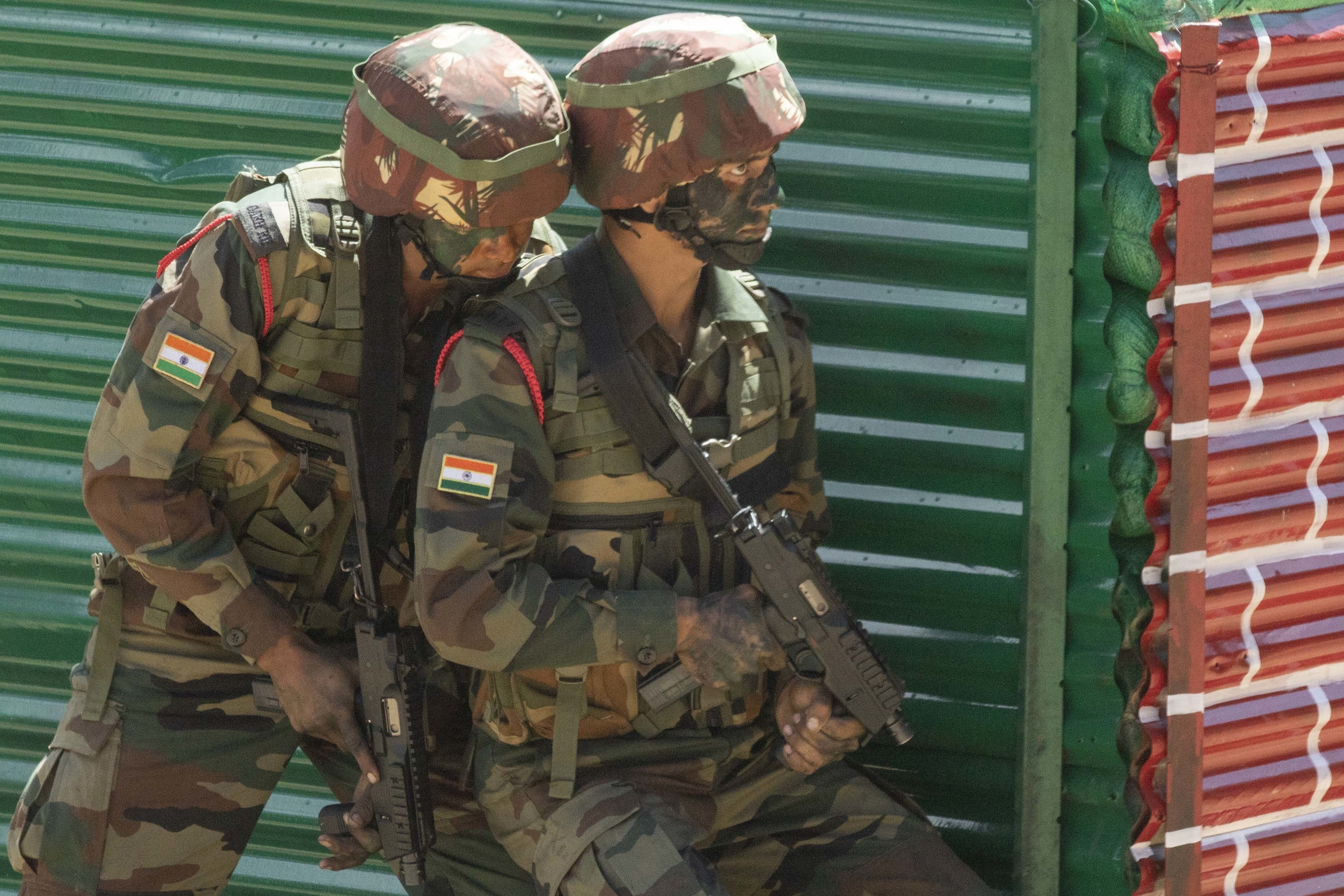
Ghatak platoon commandos armed with Brugger & Thomet MP9 during Yudh Abhyas 2018 exercise.

In August 2025, it was announced that the Indian Army is creating Bhairav light commando battalions which are scaled up versions of these units.

== Unit composition ==
A Ghatak platoon is usually 20-men strong, consisting of a commanding Captain, 2 non-commissioned officers and some specialised soldiers like designated marksman, light machine gunners, medics and radio operators. The remaining soldiers act as assault troopers. Officers and soldiers from combat support arms such as Engineers, Signals, Artillery, etc. are also deputed for specialist roles during operations.

== Training ==
The most physically fit and motivated soldiers of all arms and services of the Indian Army either volunteer or are selected to be a part of the Ghatak platoon. Personnel attend training at the Commando Training Course in Belgaum, Karnataka. As a part of the training, the soldiers are evaluated through speed marches in battle gear ranging from 20 to 60 km, carrying their rifles and 20 kg of weight in their rucksacks. Some operators are sent to the High Altitude Warfare School (HAWS) and the Counter-Insurgency and Jungle Warfare School (CIJWS) as well. However, most of them are not parachute qualified. It is mandatory for all infantry officers to pass the Commando Training Course.

== Equipment ==
Ghatak platoons are equipped with the IWI Tavor TAR-21, INSAS, or a version of the AK-47 as their primary assault rifle. As part of modernization, SIG-716 and AK-203 rifles were introduced in 2021. The marksmen are equipped with the Dragunov SVD and Heckler & Koch MSG-90 designated marksman rifles. A deal worth $5.75 million was signed with M/S B&T Switzerland for the acquisition of 1,568 advanced Brügger & Thomet MP9 sub-machine guns for the Ghatak platoons of infantry battalions. They wear standard issue camouflage and body armour. Depending on the mission, they may carry other items like ropes, climbing gear, grenades, rocket launchers, laser target designators and night vision equipment.

Some of the equipment for them are manufactured indigenously by the Indian Ordnance Factories, while other items are obtained from foreign suppliers. Currently, the Indian Army is upgrading the equipment of these units by procuring lighter body armour, personal communication sets, anti-materiel rifles and various other mission specific equipment. Additionally, door breaching ammunition and non-lethal systems like stun grenades and ballistic shields are being procured for counter-insurgency operations.

== Honours ==
Subedar Major Yogendra Singh Yadav and Honorary Captain (then Grenadier) of the 18th Battalion, The Grenadiers was a part of the Ghatak Platoon during the Battle of Tiger Hill in the Kargil War, for which he was awarded India's highest wartime gallantry award, the Param Vir Chakra.

Lieutenant Navdeep Singh of the 15th Battalion, Maratha Light Infantry was the Ghatak Platoon commander during an operation to ambush 17 well-trained and armed terrorists who had infiltrated into Jammu and Kashmir, for which he was posthumously awarded India's highest peacetime gallantry award, the Ashok Chakra.

Captain Chander Choudhary Sihag, the Ghatak Platoon commander in The Grenadiers, was killed in action and martyred on 9 September 2002, during a search and destroy operation against insurgents in Dubri village in Udhampur district, Jammu and Kashmir.

Captain Neikezhakuo Kenguruse was the Ghatak Platoon commander during a night operation during Operation Vijay in 1999 during the Kargil War. After sustaining a bullet wound, he still carried on with the operation, finally shooting dead two men and killing two others using his knife in hand-to-hand combat. He was posthumously awarded the second highest wartime gallantry award, the Mahavir Chakra.

Colonel Balwan Singh (then Lieutenant) led his Ghatak Platoon on 3 July 1999 up to the top of Tiger Hill under intense artillery fire. He was seriously injured during the operation where he was able to neutralize four enemy soldiers. He was awarded the Mahavir Chakra for his bravery.

Sepoy Gurtej Singh belonging to the Ghatak Platoon of the 3rd Battalion, Punjab Regiment engaged in hand-to-hand combat with Chinese troops in Galwan Valley on 15 June 2020 where he killed 12 enemy soldiers, including several with his kirpan, before his death. For his bravery, he was posthumously awarded the third highest wartime gallantry award, the Vir Chakra.

Captain Gurjinder Singh Suri, (4 July 1974 – 9 November 1999) was an Indian Army officer of 12 Battalion, Bihar Regiment who was posthumously awarded the Maha Vir Chakra, India's second highest gallantry award, for exemplary valor in combat during a gunbattle in the Faulad post attack in 1999.Singh was killed in a gun battle in the Gulmarg, Uri sector on 9 November 1999 where the Pakistani army attacked the Faulad Post. During this battle, Manoj Kumar, Birendra Kumar, Birendra Nath Tiwari were also killed.
