= Khanolkar =

Khanolkar is an Indian name. Notable people with the surname include:

- C. T. Khanolkar (1930–1976), Marathi playwright and poet
- Savitri Khanolkar (1913–1990), professor of sociology at Geneva University
- V. R. Khanolkar (1895–1978), Indian pathologist
