= 1889 Missile Regiment (India) =

- Active: 1976 - present
- Country: India
- Allegiance: India
- Branch: Indian Army
- Type: Artillery
- Size: Regiment
- Nickname(s): The Mighty Bombardiers
- Motto(s): Sarvatra, Izzat-O-Iqbal (Everywhere with Honour and Glory); Maan Ya Mrityu (Glory or Death)
- Colors: "Red & Navy Blue"
- Equipment: BrahMos
- Battle honours: Kargil

1889 Missile Regiment (Kargil) is a missile equipped regiment, which is part of the Regiment of Artillery of the Indian Army.

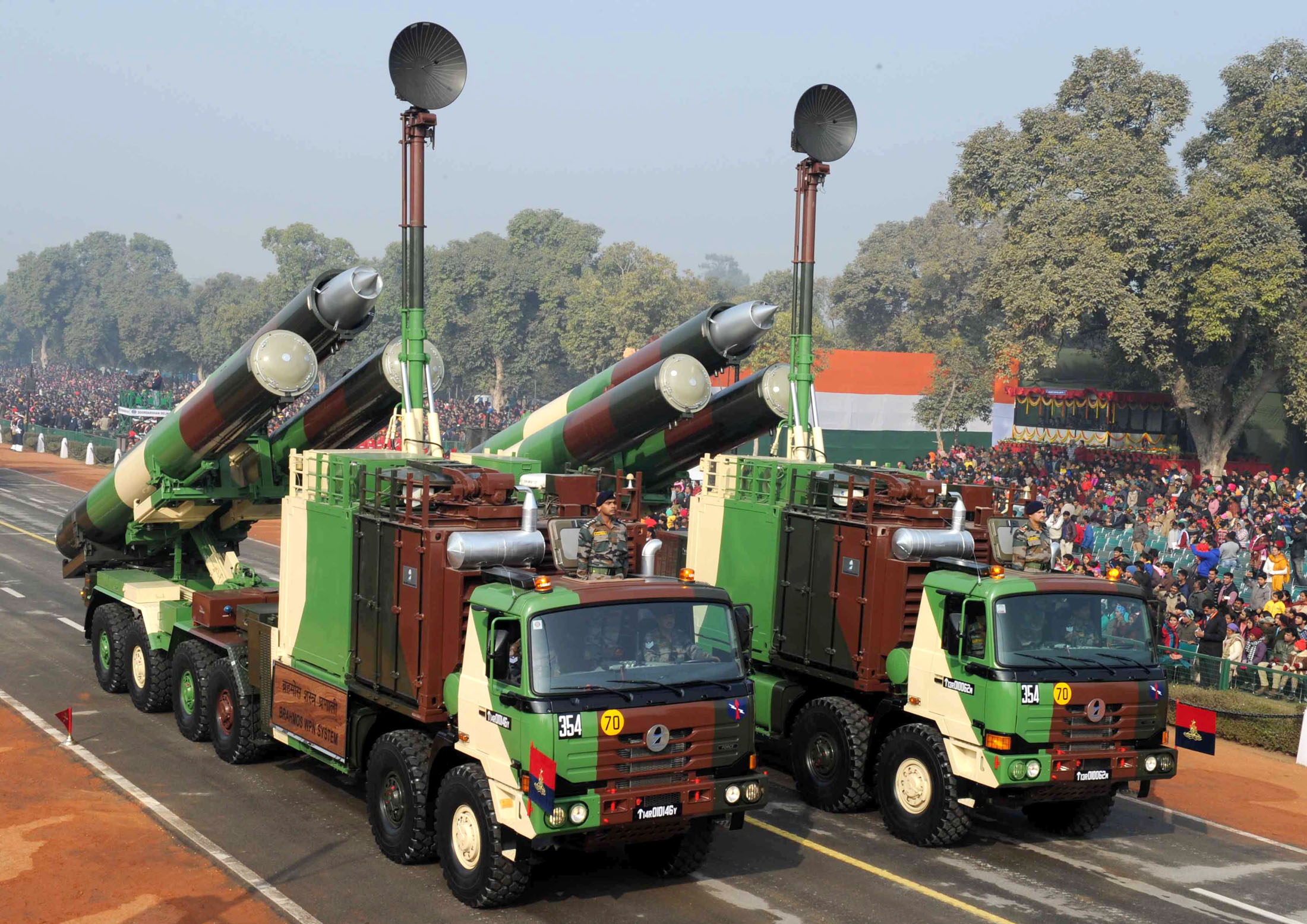
BrahMos missiles of the regiment during rehearsal of Republic Day Parade, January 2016

== History ==
The regiment was raised as 1889 (Independent) Light Battery in 1976. It was converted to a light regiment and is now a missile regiment.

=== Operations ===
- Operation Rakshak – Counter insurgency operations in Jammu and Kashmir.
- Kargil War – The regiment was equipped with 120 mm Brandt mortars and was de-inducted from the Kashmir valley along with 8 Mountain Artillery Brigade for Operation Vijay on 3 June 1999. It saw action during the Kargil war and was awarded the honour title Kargil. The unit provided Artillery Observation Posts (OP) and fire plans during the Battle of Tololing. It provided OP in the Battle of Point 5140 and for attack on Black Rock. During the Battle of Point 4700, the regiment deployed its mortars right under the nose of the enemy. It took part in the fierce Battle of Tiger Hill and Battle of Point 4875 (Gun Hill).

== Motto ==
The motto of the regiment is मान या मृत्यु (Maan Ya Mrityu), which translates to 'Glory or Death'.

== Gallantry awards ==
- Sena Medal – Lieutenant Colonel Girish Kumar Mediratta, Captain Ganesh Bhat, Captain Prashant Narayan Kamath, Subedar Bhanwar Singh (posthumous), Lance Naik Mukesh Kumar (posthumous), Gunner Avtar Singh.
- Mentioned in dispatches – Major Anil Singh
- COAS Commendation Card – Lance Naik Rahul Yadav.

== Achievements ==
- The regiment was awarded GOC-in-C, Northern Command Unit Citation in 2000.
- The regiment was awarded GOC-in-C, South Western Command Unit Citation in 2018.
- The Regiment had the honour of participating in the annual Republic Day parade in 2016.

== See also ==
- List of artillery regiments of Indian Army
