= M. B. Ravindranath =

Indian Army Colonel (1959–2018)

Colonel M. B. Ravindranath VrC
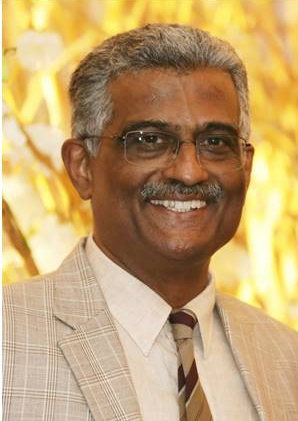
- Born: 15 May 1959; Kunduru, Honnali Tauk, Davanagere district, Karnataka, India
- Died: April 8, 2018 (aged 58); Jayanagar, Bangalore, Karnataka, India
- Spouse: Anitha
- Children: Prarthana (daughter); Prerna (daughter)
- Relatives: Magod Basappa (father); Sarojamma Basappa (mother)
- Military career
- Allegiance: India
- Branch: Indian Army
- Service years: 1980 - 2001
- Rank: Colonel
- Service number: IC-38662
- Units: 17 Madras Regiment, 21 Rajputana Rifles, 2 Rajputana Rifles
- Conflicts: Kargil War
- Awards: Vir Chakra

Colonel Magod Basappa Ravindranath VrC was an Indian Army officer. He was awarded the Vir Chakra for his actions in the Battle of Tololing during Kargil War in 1999. He was commanding the Indian Army's 2 Rajputana Rifles battalion that successfully captured the strategic heights of Tololing, Point 4590 and Black Rock in the Drass sector that dominated the Srinagar - Leh Highway (NH 1D), the first major victory that changed the course of the Kargil War.

== Early life ==
Ravindranath was born to Sarojamma and Magod Basappa in 1959 in Kunduru in Honnali Taluk, Davangere district, Karnataka, India. His father was a school teacher. He completed his school education at Sainik School, Bijapur.

== Military career ==
Ravindranath attended the National Defence Academy from 1976 to 1979, and then passed out from the Indian Military Academy in 1980. He was commissioned into the 17 MADRAS REGIMENT. He was moved to 21 RAJRIF in Feb 1985. He later commanded 2 RAJPUTANA RIFLES during Kargil Operations. He was first posted to Arunachal Pradesh, and was then posted as an instructor at the military training school in Mhow. He spent five years in Mhow before being posted to a unit on counter-insurgency operations in Jammu and Kashmir (J&K), where he served in 1986–87. Ravindranath served again in J&K in 1989–90, 1994–96 and finally in 1999.

=== Kargil War ===
During the Kargil War, Ravindranath was the commanding officer of the 2nd battalion, Rajputana Rifles (2 RAJ RIF). 2 RAJ RIF was tasked with capturing the strategic heights of Tololing, Point 4590 and Black Rock in the Dras sector. According to his citation, Ravindranath personally led his battalion's reconnaissance teams under enemy artillery and small arms fire.

On June 12, 1999, during the assault on Tololing, 2 RAJ RIF troops were under constant enemy artillery and heavy automatic fire. Realising the gravity of the situation, Ravindranath reached the spot and quickly restored the situation by his personal influence, which ultimately led to the beating back of enemy counterattacks, the capture of Tololing and the consolidation of the Indian Army's hold on Tololing and Point 4590.

On the night of June 28, 2 RAJ RIF began its assault on Black Rock. During the attack, the assaulting company lost both its officer commanding and its second-in-command. Ravindranath then personally assumed command of the company and led the assault, eventually capturing Black Rock.

For his actions during the war, Ravindranath was awarded the Vir Chakra on August 15, 1999.

== Later life ==
Ravindranath retired from the army in 2001 after the Kargil War. He lived in Bangalore and was on the board of directors for a number of self-owned ventures including Magod Fusion Technologies, Magod Laser Machining, Preusse India, and Tycoon Software Technologies.

== Death ==
Ravindranath died of a heart attack on April 8, 2018, in a neighborhood park at Bengaluru at the age of 59 while jogging. He and his wife Anitha had two daughters, Prerna and Prarthana.
