= Battle of Tiger Hill =

Battle during the Kargil War

- Part of Kargil War
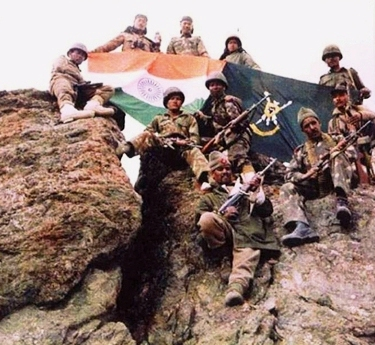
- Indian soldiers during the Kargil War
Date	Mid June – 8 July 1999
Location	Dras, Ladakh, India 34°29′00″N 75°39′38″E
Result	Indian victory

Belligerents
Indian Army Indian Air Force	Pakistan Army

Commanders and leaders
Mohinder Puri; M. P. S. Bajwa	Karnal Sher Khan †

Units involved
8 Sikh; 18 Grenadier regiment 2 Naga regiment Regiment of Artillery; 8 Infantry; Ghatak Platoon	5 Northern Light Infantry

Strength
~3,000 soldiers; Multiple Mirage 2000s; Multiple MiG-23s	Unknown

Casualties and losses
38 killed	92 killed

The Battle of Tiger Hill encompasses the battles fought in and around the peak of Tiger Hill between the Indian Army and Pakistani Army from the final week of May till second week of June 1999, during the Kargil War. The battle, with the concomitant battle for the adjoining peak of Tololing, culminated in Indian forces capturing Tiger Hill (Point 5060). The Tiger Hill area, including Point 5100, is to the west of Tololing. Peaks in Tololing include Point 5140 and Point 4875 and others.

== Battle ==
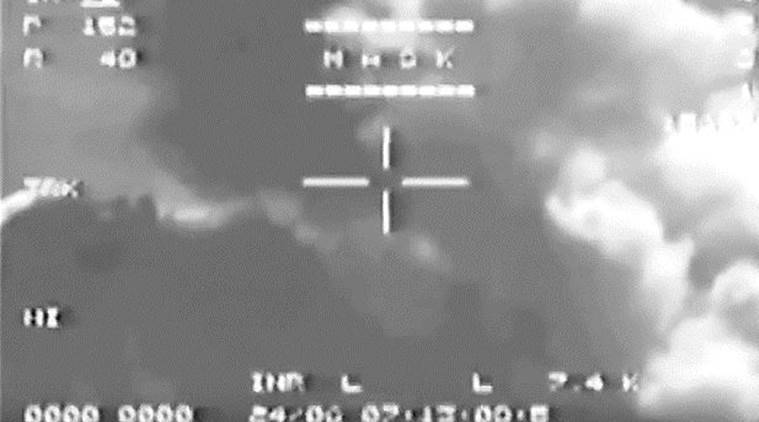
IAF Mirage on a bombing run over Tiger Hill

Tiger Hill was held by elements of the Pakistan Army's Northern Light Infantry. In late May 1999, the 8th Battalion, Sikh Regiment (8 Sikh) had attempted an assault on Tiger Hill, but were repulsed by heavy small arms fire. Poorly coordinated further assaults initiated without adequate artillery support failed under fire from an entrenched enemy. Unable to press the attack, the soldiers dug in and surrounded the hill. 192 Mountain Brigade assumed command of the operations on Tiger Hill in late June. The 18th Battalion, The Grenadiers (18 Grenadiers), fresh from participating in the victory at Tololing, were then assigned to 192 Mountain Brigade. The recapture was preceded by IAF Mirage 2000s dropping laser guided bombs onto the mountain peak to neutralise command bunkers and IAF MiG-23s using their 57mm rockets and 500 kg bombs to provide cover fire.

The final assault on Tiger Hill began on 3 July at 17:15. 22 batteries from the Regiment of Artillery, including multi-barrelled rocket launchers, pounded enemy positions on the peak for 13 continuous hours, providing covering fire for the infantry advancing up the mountain. The 2nd Battalion, Naga Regiment (2 Naga) advanced on the right flank and 8 Sikh advanced on the left. They used unexpected, and therefore difficult, avenues of approach, maintaining the element of surprise. 200 men from Alpha and Charlie Companies of 18 Grenadiers, along with the battalion's Ghatak platoon, advanced up the rear side of the mountain, a 1,000-foot vertical cliff which the Grenadiers climbed up in 12 hours using fixed ropes, in the freezing rain. They almost made it to the top before the Pakistanis atop the peak spotted them and opened heavy fire, stalling their attack. Sensing the loss of initiative, Maj. Ravinder Singh of 8 Sikh launched a daring attack. He and a detachment of 200 soldiers climbed up the side of the adjoining Western Ridge, splitting the Pakistani defense on the night of 5 July. The group held off several counterattacks. Most of the Sikh soldiers attacked without cold weather gear, and many of the wounded died from exposure. After three more days of heavy fighting, the bold plan paid off, and 18 Grenadiers resumed the attack on the invaders from two directions. 18 Grenadiers seized the 16,700-foot (5,062 m) Tiger Hill Top on the morning of 8 July.

Indian Army launched eight attacks on Karnal Sher Khan's position to capture the strategic posts. However, Khan and his men were able to defend those strategic posts. On 5 July 1999, the Indian army launched another attack and surrounded his posts with two battalions. With heavy mortar fire, the Indian Army captured one of his posts. Karnal Sher Khan personally led a successful counter-attack and was able to re-capture the lost post. Despite shortage of ammunition and men, Khan was successful in forcing the Indian army to retreat. However, during the battle he was hit by machine gun fire and was killed in action by NK Satpal Singh. Indian Army Brigadier M. P. S. Bajwa was impressed by the actions of Karnal Sher Khan and wrote to the government of Pakistan citing the bravery of the young officer. Bajwa wrote a citation for Khan and placed it in his pocket while returning his body to the Pakistani officials. Khan's actions during the war were also vouched by his fellow Pakistani soldiers and Khan was posthumously awarded Pakistan's highest military honour, the Nishan-e-Haider. Satpal Singh was awarded the Vir Chakra by the Republic of India.

Tololing near the Line of Control

Gren. Yogendra Singh Yadav of 18 Grenadiers was awarded the highest military honour of Republic of India, the Param Vir Chakra, for his actions during the battle. Overall, Yadav suffered 17 bullet wounds and played a major role in capture of Tiger Hill.

== See also ==
- Battle of Tololing
