= Sanjay Kumar (soldier) =

Recipient of Param Vir Chakra

Honorary Captain (Subedar Major) Sanjay Kumar PVC
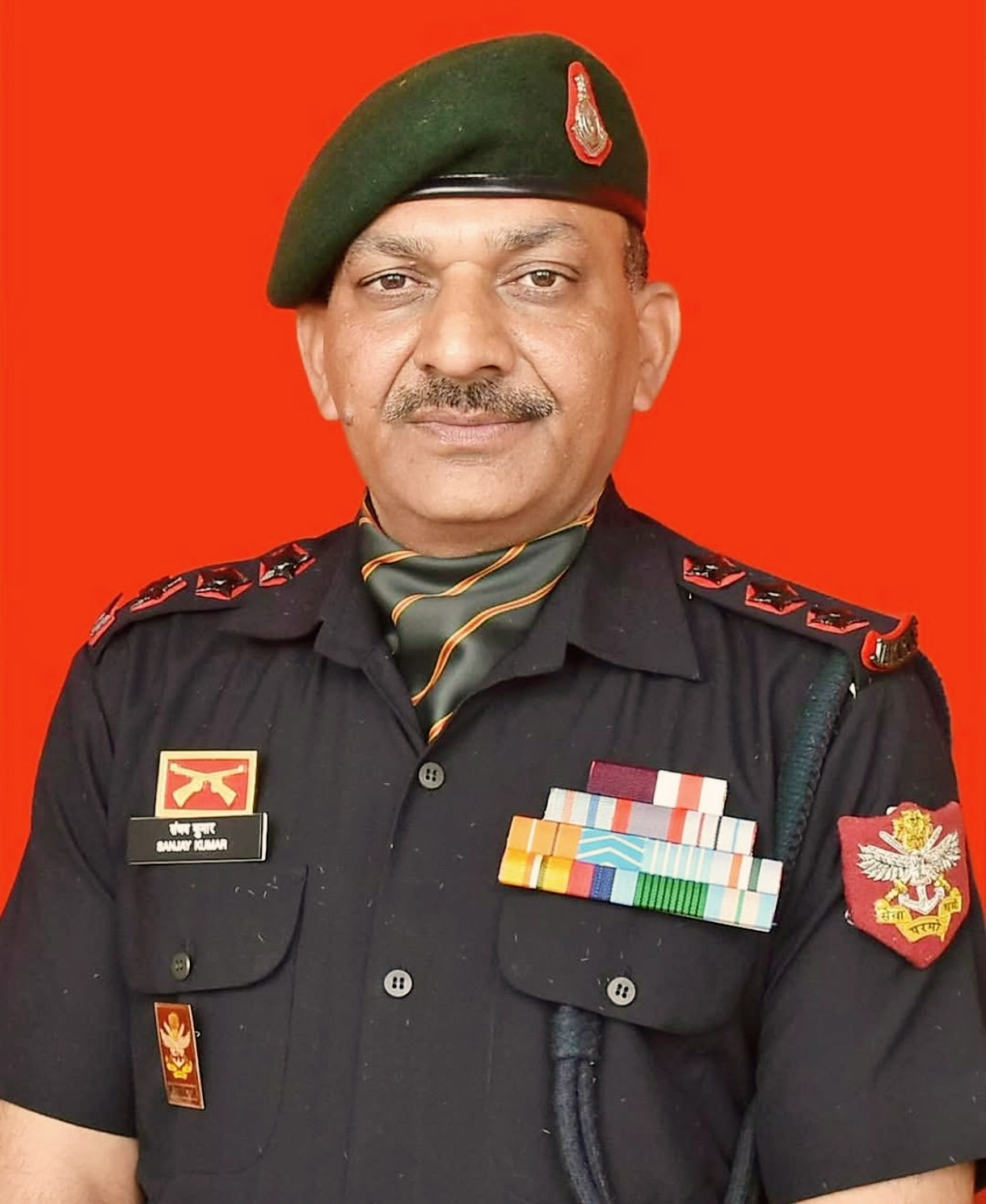
- Born: 3 March 1976 (age 50); Kalol Bakain, Bilaspur district, Himachal Pradesh, India
- Alma mater: Govt. Sr. Secondary School, Kalol
- Military career
- Allegiance: Republic of India
- Branch: Indian Army
- Service years: 26 June 1996 - 28 February 2026
- Rank: Honorary Captain Subedar Major
- Service number: 13760533
- Unit: 13 JAK RIF
- Conflicts: Kargil War
- Awards: Param Vir Chakra

Honorary Captain (Subedar Major) Sanjay Kumar PVC (born 3 March 1976) is a retired Indian military officer, and recipient of the Param Vir Chakra, India's highest military award for his exemplary bravery during Kargil War.

== Early life ==
Sanjay Kumar was born in village Kalol Bakain in Bilaspur District of Himachal Pradesh in a Dogra family of Durga Ram and Bhag Devi. He completed his secondary education from Government Senior Secondary School, Kalol. Prior to joining the army, he worked as a taxi driver in New Delhi. His uncle was in the Indian Army while his second brother is also serving with the Indo Tibetan Border Police. His application was rejected three times before he was finally selected to join the army. He was enlisted in 13 Jammu and Kashmir Rifles of Indian Army on 26 June 1996.

== Military career ==
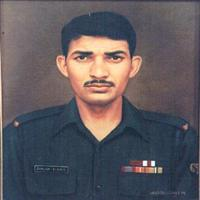
Young Rifleman Kumar

=== Param Vir Chakra Action ===
On 4 July 1999, as a member of the 13th Battalion, Jammu & Kashmir Rifles, he was the leading scout of a team tasked to capturing Area Flat Top, during the Kargil War. The area was held by Pakistani troops. Having scaled the cliff, the team was pinned down by machine gun fire from an enemy bunker, about 150 meters away.

Kumar, realising the magnitude of the problem and the detrimental effect this bunker would have in the capture of Area Flat Top, crawled alone up the ledge, along a flank, and charged towards the enemy bunker though there was a bullet rain. Almost instantly he took two bullets in his chest and forearm that left him bleeding profusely.

Though bleeding from the bullet wounds, he continued the charge towards the bunker. In hand-to-hand fighting, he killed three enemy soldiers. He then picked up an enemy machine gun and crept towards the second enemy bunker. The enemy soldiers, taken completely by surprise, were killed by him as they fled their post. Inspired by his act the rest of the platoon charged, assaulted the feature and captured Area Flat Top.

=== Later career ===
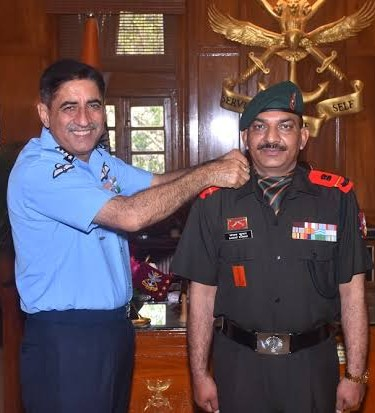
Subedar Sanjay Kumar is promoted to the rank of Subedar Major during the term as an instructor at National Defence Academy.

In February 2022, he received the rank of Subedar Major and is posted to the National Defence Academy in Khadakwasla near Pune.

== Param Vir Chakra citation ==
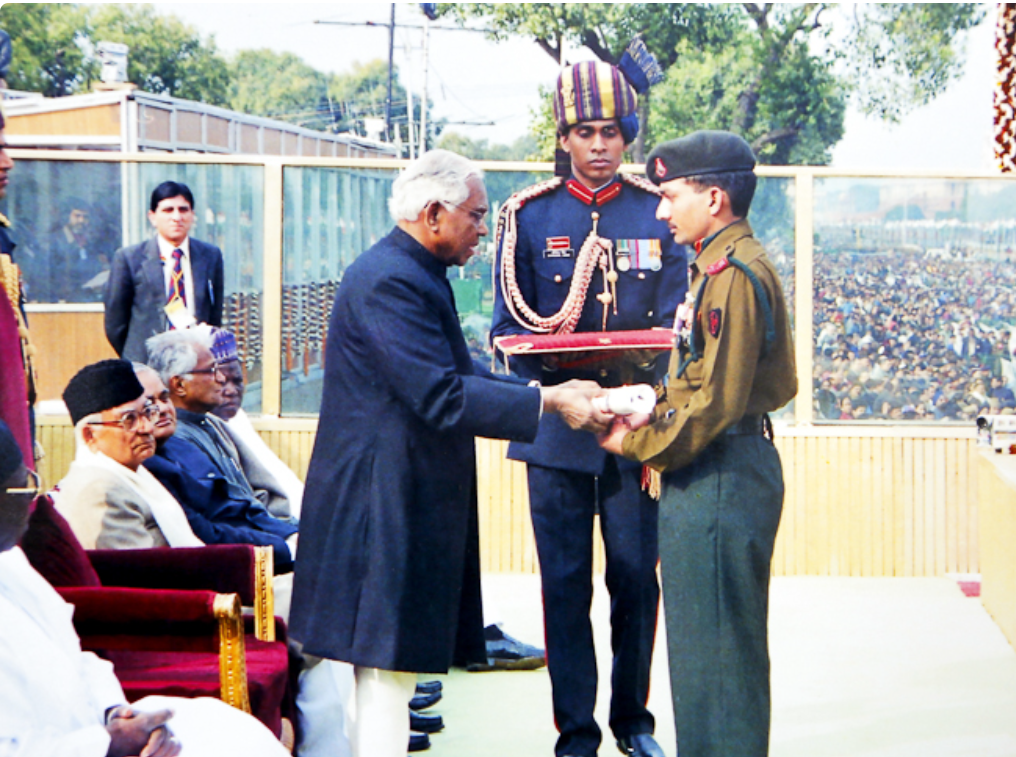
Havildar Sanjay Kumar receiving PVC from the then Honorable President of India KR Narayanan

The Param Vir Chakra citation on the official Indian Army website reads as follows:

Rifleman Sanjay Kumar volunteered to be the leading scout of the attacking column tasked to capture area Flat Top of Point 4875 in the Mushkoh Valley on 4 July 1999. During the attack when enemy automatic fire from one of the sangars posed stiff opposition and stalled the column, Rifleman Sanjay Kumar, realizing the gravity of the situation and with utter disregard to his personal safety, charged at the enemy. In the ensuing hand-to-hand combat, he killed three of the intruders and was himself seriously injured. Despite his injuries, he charged onto the second bunker. Taken totally by surprise, the enemy left behind a Universal Machine Gun and started running.

Rifleman Sanjay Kumar picked up the UMG and killed the fleeing enemy. Although bleeding profusely, he refused to be evacuated. The brave action on his part motivated his comrades and they took no notice of the treacherous terrain and charged onto the enemy and wrested the area Flat Top from the hands of the enemy.

Rifleman Sanjay Kumar displayed most conspicuous gallantry, cool courage and devotion to duty of an exceptionally high order in the face of the enemy.

== Awards and decorations ==
During his career, he has been awarded with the Param Vir Chakra (Independence Day 1999) for his part in the Operation Vijay.

Param Vir Chakra		Wound Medal	
Special Service Medal	Operation Vijay Star		Operation Vijay Medal
Sainya Seva Medal	High Altitude Medal	Videsh Seva Medal	75th Independence Anniversary Medal
50th Independence Anniversary Medal	20 Years Long Service Medal	9 Years Long Service Medal	UNMEE Medal

== Dates of rank ==
Insignia	Rank	Component	Date of rank
	Rifleman	Indian Army	26 June 1996
	Havildar	Indian Army	26 January 2000 Directly promoted to the rank of Havildar for receiving Param Vir Chakra
	Naib Subedar	Indian Army	2 July 2014
	Subedar	Indian Army	
	Subedar Major	Indian Army	February 2022
	Honorary Lieutenant	Indian Army	15 August 2025
	Honorary Captain	Indian Army	26 January 2026

== Controversy ==
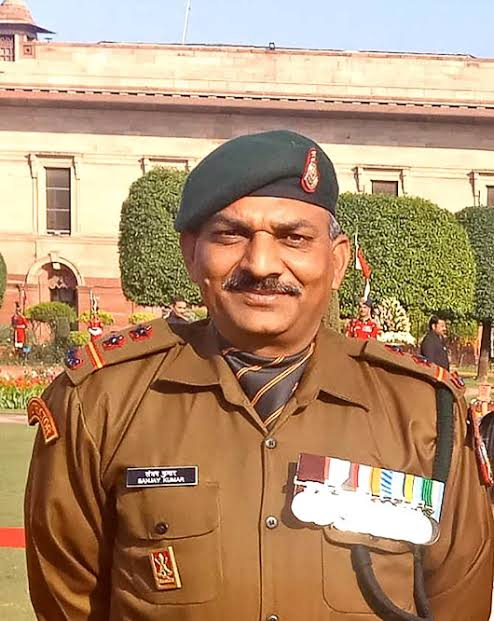
Then Subedar Sanjay Kumar wearing the PVC medal at the first position of the medal tally.

In 2010 Kumar was demoted from the rank of Havildar to Lance Naik. The army refused to cite any reasons for his demotion. Moreover, the army concealed the facts and by continuing to refer to him as Havildar in press releases. Recipients of the Param-Vir Chakra are saluted irrespective of rank, which is alleged to be the bone of contention between Kumar and senior officers.

Kumar was offered a job by the Himachal Pradesh Government and may accept this offer after completing his 15 years of service (for receiving post-retirement benefits) in the army.

On 2 July 2014, Kumar became a Junior Commissioned Officer (JCO) of the Indian Army, with his promotion to Naib Subedar. While the promotion of Kumar had once become an issue in the Army after he was allegedly demoted to the rank of Lance Naik from the rank of Havildar in 2008, the issue was later buried with the intervention of higher authorities. It was also stated that there are no out-of-turn promotions for recipients of gallantry awards in the Army and they are promoted as per their seniority with their fellow soldiers in the unit.

He was promoted to the rank of Subedar Major in February 2022.

== In popular culture ==
Kumar's story along with others who were part of the same conflict was portrayed in the film LOC Kargil, in which his character was played by famous Bollywood actor Sunil Shetty.

== Legacy ==
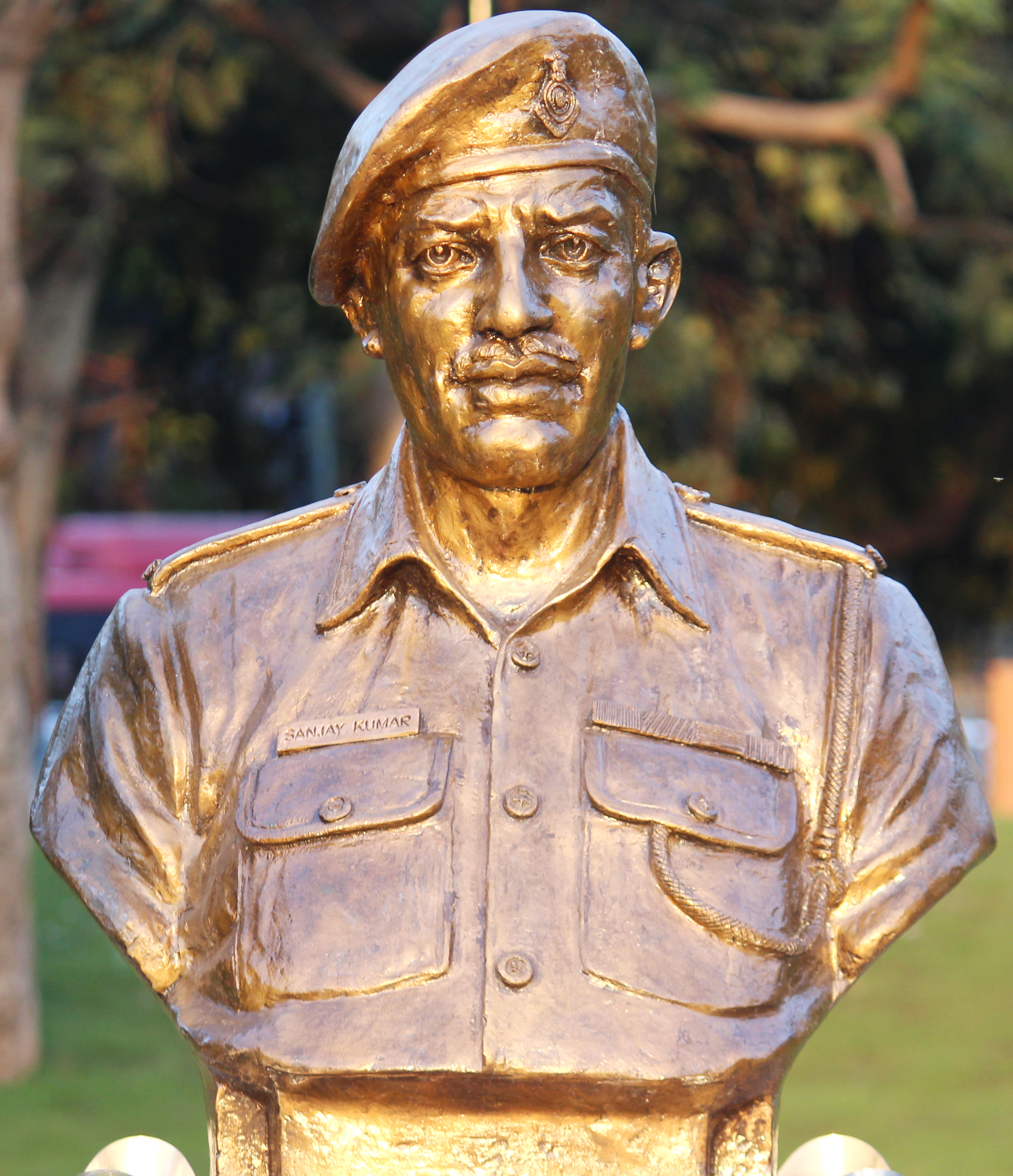
Rifleman (now Subedar Major) Sanjay Kumar statue at Param Yodha Sthal, Delhi.

A statue of Sub Maj Sanjay Kumar was unveiled at Param Yodha Sthal, Delhi with 20 other PVC Awardees. One of the Islands of Andaman and Nicobar has been renamed as Sanjay Dweep with other 20 PVC awardees on Parakram Diwas 23 January 2021.

== See also ==
- Yogendra Yadav, PVC

== Notes ==
- Cardozo, Major General Ian (retd.) (2003), Param Vir: Our Heroes in Battle, New Delhi: Roli Books, ISBN 978-81-7436-262-9
