= Yogendra Singh Yadav =

Recipient of Param Vir Chakra(born 10 May 1980)

Honorary Captain (Subedar Major) Yogendra Singh Yadav PVC
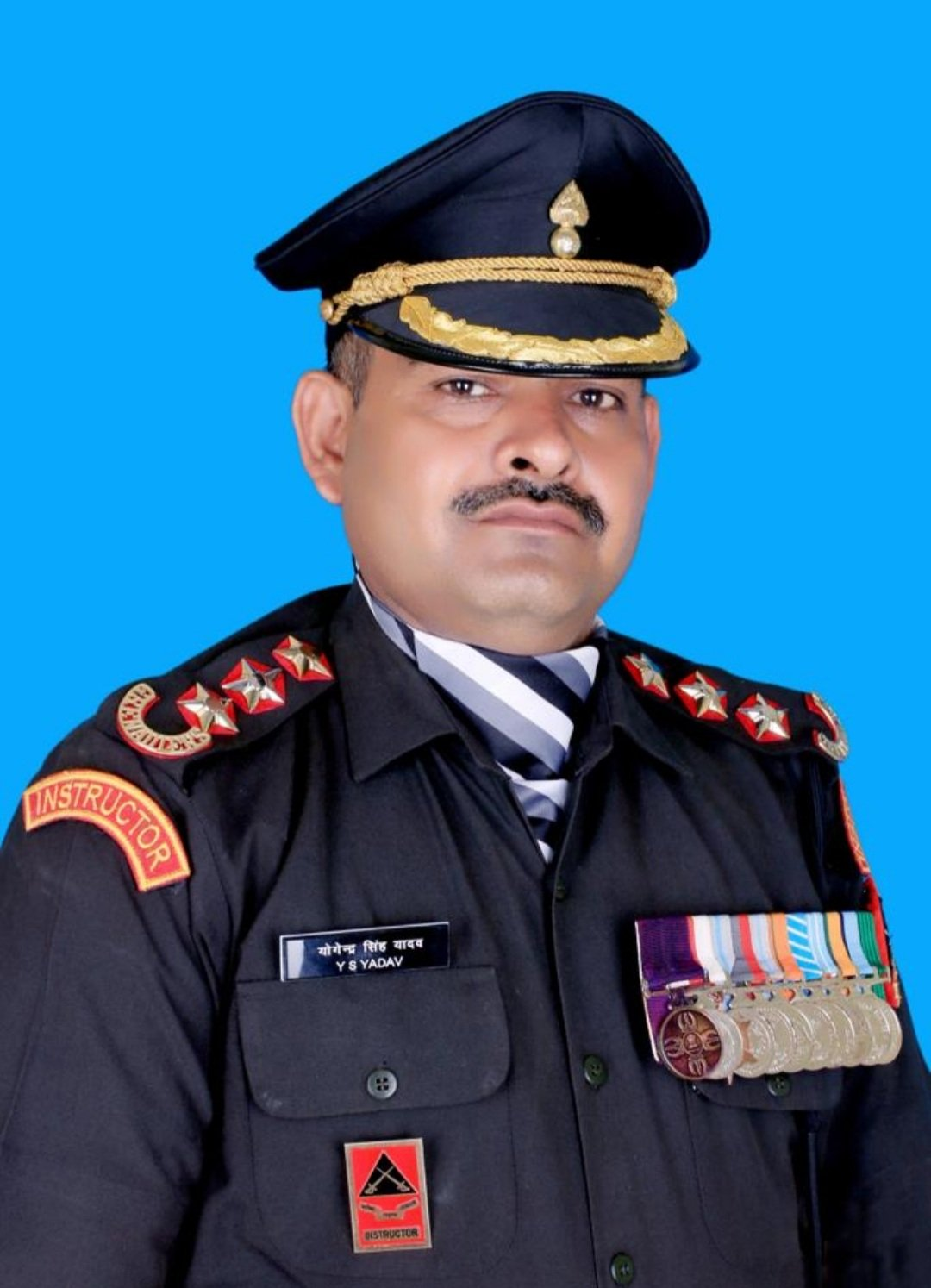
- Official portrait of Captain Yadav in 2021 wearing PVC
- Born: 10 May 1980 (age 46); Bulandshahr district, Uttar Pradesh, India
- Alma mater: Government High School, Aurangabad Ahir, Bulandshahar
- Military career
- Allegiance: India
- Branch: Indian Army
- Service years: 27 December 1996 - 31 December 2021
- Rank: Honorary Captain Subedar Major
- Service number: 2690572K
- Unit: 18th Grenadiers
- Conflicts: Kargil War; Battle of Tiger Hill; Battle of Tololing
- Awards: Param Vir Chakra; Yash Bharati

Subedar Major and Honorary Captain Yogendra Singh Yadav PVC (born 10 May 1980) is a retired Indian military officer, who was awarded India's highest military award, the Param Vir Chakra, for his actions during the Kargil War. He is the youngest recipient of the Param Vir Chakra to date, having received it at the age of 19.

== Early life ==
Yadav was born in a Yadav family on 10 May 1980 in Aurangabad Ahir, Bulandshahr District, Uttar Pradesh. His father Karan Singh Yadav served in the Kumaon Regiment, participating in the 1965 and 1971 Indo-Pakistan wars. His elder brother Jitendra Singh Yadav also serving in Regiment of Artillery of Indian Army. Yadav joined the Indian Army at 16 years and five months of age.

== Career ==
=== Kargil War ===
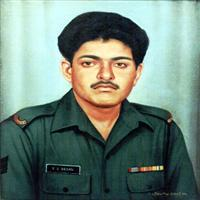
Portrait of Havildar Yadav

Yadav enlisted with the 18 Grenadiers, and part of the Ghatak Force commando platoon, tasked to capture three strategic bunkers on Tiger Hill in the early morning hours of 4 July 1999. The bunkers were situated at the top of a vertical, snow-covered, 1,000 ft (300 m) cliff face. Yadav volunteered to lead the assault, climbed the cliff face, and installed ropes that would allow further assaults on the feature. Halfway up, machine gun and rocket fire came from an enemy bunker, killing the platoon commander and two others. In spite of being hit by multiple bullets in his groin and shoulder, Yadav climbed the remaining 60 feet (18 m) and reached the top. Though severely injured, he crawled to the first bunker and lobbed a grenade, killing four Pakistani soldiers and neutralizing enemy fire. This gave the rest of the platoon the opportunity to climb up the cliff face bunker along with two of his fellow soldiers and engaged in hand-to-hand combat, killing four Pakistani soldiers. The platoon subsequently succeeded in capturing Tiger Hill. Though Yadav was hit by 17 bullets he played a major role in its capture.

The Param Vir Chakra was announced for Yadav posthumously, but it was soon discovered that he was recuperating in a hospital, and it was his namesake who had been slain in the mission.

=== Later career ===
Yadav was conferred the honorary rank of Captain by the President of India on Independence Day of 2021. Lieutenant General Rajeev Sirohi, Military Secretary and Colonel of the Regiment of the Grenadiers, presented the rank badges. He retired from army on 31 December 2021 in the Honorary Captain rank with a traditional send-off.

After retirement, Yadav joined the advisory board of udChalo, a consumer technology company serving armed forces personnel.

== Param Vir Chakra Citation & Other Medals... ==
The Param Vir Chakra citation on the official Indian Army website reads as follows:

Grenadier Yogendra Singh Yadav was part of the leading team of Ghatak Platoon tasked to capture Tiger Hill on the night of 3/4 July 1999. The approach to the top was steep, snow bound and rocky. Grenadier Yogendra Singh Yadav, unmindful of the risk involved, volunteered to be in the lead and fixed rope of his team to climb up. On seeing the team, the enemy opened intense automatic grenade, rocket and artillery fire killing the commander and two of his colleagues and the platoon was stalled. Realising the gravity of the situation, Grenadier Yadav crawled up to the enemy position to silence it and in the process sustained multiple injuries. Unmindful of his injuries and in the hail of enemy bullets, Grenadier Yadav continued climbing towards the enemy positions. Lobbing grenades and continuously firing from his weapon, he killed four enemy soldiers in close combat and silenced the automatic fire. Despite multiple injuries, he refused to be evacuated and continued the charge. Inspired by his gallant act, the platoon charged on to the other positions with renewed punch and captured Tiger Hill Top. Grenadier Yogendra Singh Yadav displayed the most conspicuous courage, indomitable gallantry, grit and determination under extreme adverse circumstances.

== Awards and decorations ==

| Param Vir Chakra | Wound Medal | Special Service Medal | Operation Vijay Star |
| Operation Vijay Medal | Operation Parakram Medal | Sainya Seva Medal | High Altitude Medal |
| Videsh Seva Medal | 50th Independence Anniversary Medal | 20 Years Long Service Medal | 9 Years Long Service Medal |

== Dates of rank ==
| Insignia | Rank | Component | Date of rank |
|---|---|---|---|
| | Grenadier | Indian Army | 27 December 1996 |
| | Havildar | Indian Army | 26 January 2000 Directly promoted to the rank of Havildar for receiving Param Vir Chakra |
| | Naib Subedar | Indian Army | |
| | Subedar | Indian Army | |
| | Subedar Major | Indian Army | |
| | Honorary Lieutenant | Indian Army | 26 January 2021 |
| | Honorary Captain | Indian Army | 15 August 2021 |

== Portrayal in film and media ==
In the 2004 Hindi-language film Lakshya (based on the Battle of Tiger Hill), the actions of the fictional war hero Karan Shergill (played by Hrithik Roshan) is a screen adaptation depicting the heroic deeds of Yadav's platoon, among others. It provides a detailed description of their arduous journey to capture the strategically placed bunkers on Tiger Hill.

The assault led by another Ghatak Platoon unit from the same regiment on Tololing was adapted as one of the prominent battle scenes in the Hindi film LOC Kargil. Manoj Bajpai portrayed the role of Yadav in the film.

== Other honours ==
He joined the show Kaun Banega Crorepati in 2020 on a special invitation from Amitabh Bachchan, along with fellow Param Vir Chakra recipient Subedar Sanjay Kumar. He donated the entire amount (₹2.5 million) won to the Army Welfare Fund. In the year 2015, he was awarded the state's highest award Yash Bharti by Uttar Pradesh Government for his service towards the country.

== See also ==
- Sanjay Kumar, PVC
