= Savitri Khanolkar =

Swiss-Indian designer (1913-1990)

- Born: Eve Yvonne Maday de Maros; 20 July 1913; Neuchâtel, Switzerland
- Died: 26 November 1990 (aged 77); New Delhi, India
- Citizenship: Swiss; Indian
- Known for: Designer of: Param Vir Chakra; Maha Vir Chakra; Vir Chakra
- Spouse: Maj. Gen. Vikram Ramji Khanolkar (m. 1932; died 1952)
- Parents: André de Maday (father); Marthe Hentzelt (mother)

Savitri Bai Khanolkar (born Eve Yvonne Maday de Maros, 20 July 1913 – 26 November 1990) was a Swiss-Indian designer, best known for designing the Param Vir Chakra (PVC), India's highest military decoration, awarded for displaying distinguished acts of valour during wartime. Khanolkar later designed the Maha Vir Chakra (MVC) and several other major gallantry medals, including the Ashok Chakra (AC), Kirti Chakra (KC), Vir Chakra (VrC) and Shaurya Chakra (SC). She had also designed the General Service Medal 1947, which was used until 1965. Khanolkar was also a painter and an artist.

Born Eve Yvonne Maday de Maros in Neuchâtel, Switzerland, she married Indian Army Captain (later Major General) Vikram Ramji Khanolkar in 1932, and subsequently changed her name to Savitri Bai Khanolkar, became a Hindu and acquired Indian citizenship.

Soon after Indian independence, she was asked by the Adjutant General Major General Hira Lal Atal to design India's highest award for bravery in combat, the Param Vir Chakra. Major General Atal had been given the responsibility of creating and naming independent India's new military decorations. His reasons for choosing Khanolkar were her deep and intimate knowledge of Indian culture, Sanskrit and Vedas, which he hoped would give the design a truly Indian ethos.

Coincidentally, the first PVC was awarded to her elder daughter Kumudini Sharma's brother-in-law Major Somnath Sharma from 4 Kumaon Regiment who was posthumously awarded the decoration on 3 November 1947 during the Indo-Pakistani War of 1947 in Kashmir.

== Early life ==
Born in Neuchâtel, Switzerland to a Hungarian father André de Maday, professor of sociology at Geneva University and President of the Société de Sociologie de Genève, and Russian mother Marthe Hentzelt, who taught at the Institut Jean-Jacques Rousseau (Rousseau Institute), she spent her early childhood in Geneva, where she grew to be a compassionate girl with a love of nature and the outdoors. In 1929, when she was still a teenager, she met Vikram Ramji Khanolkar. From a Marathi family, Khanolkar was a young Indian Army cadet undergoing training at the Royal Military Academy, Sandhurst in the United Kingdom, and was visiting Switzerland during a term break. Although he was many years older than she was, Eve fell in love with him. Her father however, did not agree to let her go away to a faraway country like India but Eve was a determined young woman, and her love was strong. She followed Vikram to India a few years later, and in 1932, she married him in Lucknow. She subsequently changed her name to Savitri Bai Khanolkar.

== Indian connection ==
Savitri Bai identified so closely with Hindu traditions and ideals, that her integration into Indian society was simple. She was a vegetarian, learned to speak fluent Marathi, Sanskrit and Hindi and learned Indian music, dance and painting. She always claimed she had been "born in Europe by mistake" as she was an “Indian soul” and disliked being referred to as a “foreigner.” She was so fascinated with Indian culture she read extensively from Hindu scriptures and had a deep knowledge of India's ancient history and legends. It was this knowledge which led Major General Hira Lal Atal, the creator of the Param Vir Chakra, to ask for Savitri Bai's help in designing a medal that would truly symbolize the highest bravery.

== The design of Param Vir Chakra ==
Savitribai thought of the sage Dadhichi – a vedic rishi who made the ultimate sacrifice to the Gods. He gave up his body so the Gods could fashion a deadly weapon – a Vajra, or thunderbolt, from his spine. Savitribai gave Major General Hira Lal Atal, the design of the double Vajra, common in Tibet. It is said that Savitri Bai Khanolkar, after studying India's history, wanted to make a mark of Shivaji to give him a tribute, whom she found out was one of the greatest Hindu warriors ever born, so she ensured Shivaji sword bhavani was placed into India's highest wartime medal, she made a design in which Indra's vajra was surrounded on two sides by Shivaji's sword bhavani.

The medal itself is a small one. It is cast in bronze with a diameter of 13/8 inches (41 mm). In the centre, on a raised circle, is the state emblem, surrounded by four replicas of Indra's Vajra, flanked by swords. The decoration is suspended from a straight swiveling suspension bar, and is held by a 32 mm purple ribbon.

== Later life ==
Savitri Bai had always done a lot a social work which she continued in her later years, working with soldiers and their families and refugees who had been displaced during the Partition. After her husband's death in 1952, she found refuge in spirituality, and retired to the Ramakrishna Math. She wrote a book on the Saints of Maharashtra that is still popular today.

== Death ==
Savitri Bai Khanolkar died on 26 November 1990.
