= Battle of Tololing =

1999 battle during the Kargil War

- Part of the Kargil War
Date	14 May – 7 July 1999
Location	Dras, Ladakh, India 34°27′51″N 75°47′45″E
Result	Indian victory

Belligerents
India	Pakistan

Commanders and leaders
Mohinder Puri; Kushal Thakur; M. B. Ravindranath; R Vishwanathan †; Vijayant Thapar † Major Padmapani Acharya	Anwar Khan

Units involved
18 Grenadiers; 16 Grenadiers; 1 Naga Regiment; 2 Rajputana Rifles; 197 Field Regiment; 41 Field Regiment; 1889 Light Regiment; 108 Medium Regiment; 158 Medium Regiment; 253 Medium Regiment; 139 Medium Regiment (1 battery); 244 Heavy Mortar Regiment (2 batteries); 212 Rocket Regiment (1 battery)	5 Northern Light Infantry; 6 Northern Light Infantry; Mujahideen

Casualties and losses
27 soldiers killed 49 soldiers wounded	50

The Battle of Tololing was a pivotal battle in the Kargil War between India and troops from one full battalion of Pakistan’s Northern Light Infantry who were aided by Pakistani irregulars in 1999.

Tololing near the Line of Control

== Background ==
The Tololing peak dominates over the Srinagar-Leh Highway (NH 1D), which is a vital link. Peaks in Tololing include Point 5140 and Point 4875, 4590.

== Battle ==
Units under the command of Maj Gen Mohinder Puri of the 8 Mountain Division were tasked with recapturing the positions held by the infiltrators. The battle lasted 32 days. Initially only units from the 121 Independent Infantry brigade under the command of Brig. O.P. Nandrajog was sent to evict the intruders. The strength of the infiltrators of Tololing was under-estimated grossly.

Col Kushal Thakur was tasked with heading the attack. Later, 1 Naga and Garhwal battalions were also attached to the forces.

The forces began the assault on 22 May. The initial assault was heavily resisted by the Pakistani forces. Pakistani forces were very well entrenched and fortified on the hill. On 30 May, the Indian forces approached the ridge very slowly and eventually a company led by Major Rajesh Adhikari approached the peak. In the resulting gunfight, Maj Adhikari was killed-in-action by Pakistani sniper. The 2inC of 18 Grenadiers, Lt Col Vishwanathan was also KIA.

On 28 May, a Mi-17 helicopter aiding the attack on Tololing peak was shot down by a SAM. All 4 crew members were killed. This attack severely affected the morale of the Indian forces.

Between 2 June and 11 June, the Pakistani and Indian forces remained at stalemate as Indian forces made several attempts to recover Maj Adhikari's body. Kushal Thakur worked hard to resupply the positions and recover the bodies of the killed soldiers. In this period several other units were brought to help with the attack. 2 Rajputana rifles was eventually brought in for assistance and a final assault was planned.

On 2 July, the final assault began. Under the guise of heavy artillery fire, the Indian forces assaulted the Pakistani forces from front and one company under the command of Major Vivek Gupta flanked the enemy positions. In the resulting assault, Maj Gupta was killed in action. By 7 July, all enemy positions were abandoned by Pakistani forces and the Indian companies recaptured Tololing.

== Aftermath ==
Major Rajesh Adhikari, Major Vivek Gupta ( Posthumously)and Havildar Digendra Kumar were awarded the Maha Vir Chakra India's second highest war time military honour for their daring actions on the peak. Col Ravindranath and Captain Vijayant Thapar were awarded Vir Chakra.

From Pakistan's side, Major Abdul Wahab was awarded the Sitara-e-Jurat, Pakistan's third highest military honour as Major Abdul Wahab was killed defending the captured peak.

== In popular culture ==
Turning Point at Tololing, a feature documentary hosted by Maj Gen G. D. Bakshi, aired on the Indian television channel Epic TV. It details the political and military background and course of the battle.

== See also ==
- Battle of Tiger Hill
