= Vikram Ramji Khanolkar =

Indian general

Major-General Vikram Ramji Khanolkar
- Born: 28 June 1905; Quetta, Baluchistan Province, British Raj (now in Pakistan)
- Died: 29 August 1952 (aged 47); Between Ranchi and Kolkata (in train), India
- Spouse: Savitri Khanolkar (m. 1932)
- Military career
- Allegiance: British India; India
- Branch: British Indian Army; Indian Army
- Service years: 1927–1952
- Rank: Major-General
- Service number: IA-421
- Units: Sikh Regiment; 11th Sikh Regiment; 4th Bombay Grenadiers
- Commands: GOC, 20 Infantry Division; GOC, Delhi Area; 6th Battalion, 11th Sikhs; Commandant, Travancore State Forces; 2nd Nayar Infantry
- Conflicts: World War II; North African campaign; Western Desert campaign; Italian Campaign; Gothic Line; Indo-Pakistani War of 1947

Major-General Vikram Ramji Khanolkar (28 June 1905 – 29 August 1952) was an Indian Army general.

== Early life and career ==
Khanolkar was from a noted family in Sawantwadi State. Born in Quetta, he received his early education in the city before further studies at Wilson College, Mumbai. In 1927, he enlisted as a sepoy in the 1st Battalion of the 4th Bombay Grenadiers and received a Viceroy's Commission the following year. He served in Zhob during this time. His brother was V. R. Khanolkar.

In 1929, he was selected for a King's Commission as a King's Commissioned Indian Officer (KCIO). He passed out from the Royal Military Academy Sandhurst on 29 January 1931 (seniority from 2 November 1927), and as was customary was posted to a British Army regiment, the East Lancashire Regiment, for a period of one year before receiving his British Indian Army appointment.

He was promoted lieutenant in the Indian Army on 1 April 1932 (seniority from 2 February 1930), and was posted to the 5th Battalion (Duke of Connaught's Own) of the 11th Sikh Regiment. On 3 May 1935, he was appointed battalion quartermaster, taking eight months leave from April through December 1936. He was promoted captain on 8 March 1937 and was appointed a company commander in the 10th Battalion of the 11th Sikhs from 1 January 1938.

== Wartime service ==
From 3 December 1940, Khanolkar was seconded to the Travancore State Forces, in which he was appointed commander of the 2nd Nayar Infantry, serving in this capacity until December 1941. with a subsequent appointment as overall Commandant of the State Forces in the acting rank of major.

Following his service in Travancore, Khanolkar returned to his regiment and helped raise the 14/11 Sikhs. He was promoted temporary major on 1 May 1942 and was appointed second-in-command of the 5/11 Sikhs the following year, seeing service with them in North Africa and Italy. He was promoted substantive major on 2 November 1944. He then returned to India with a promotion to acting lieutenant-colonel and commanded the 6/11 Sikhs in Waziristan.

== Later career and death ==
In 1946, Khanolkar was promoted temporary lieutenant-colonel and was appointed president of a Permanent Commission Selection Board for the Army, which travelled across SE Asia including to Japan, Burma and Singapore. He was promoted acting colonel (war-substantive lieutenant-colonel) on 14 July 1946. After Independence and Partition, he was appointed commandant of a refugee camp at Kurukshetra, with responsibility for nearly 3,70,000 refugees. He then briefly commanded Jalandhar Sub-Area and a brigade in Jammu before being promoted acting major-general and taking charge as GOC Delhi Area on 5 August 1949, in which capacity he was known as a strict disciplinarian and skilled administrator.

In January 1952, Khanolkar assumed command of the 20th Infantry Division at Calcutta. He went on tour in the Ranchi area in August. While returning to Calcutta by train along with his wife, he died of heart failure on the morning of 29 August. He was posthumously promoted to the substantive rank of major-general with effect from 1 March 1952.

== Personal life ==
In 1932, Khanolkar married Swiss-born Eve Yvonne Maday de Maros, an artist and designer of Hungarian-Russian descent who subsequently converted to Hinduism and changed her name to Savitri Khanolkar. The couple had two daughters and a son.

== Dates of rank ==
Insignia	Rank	Component	Date of rank
-	Sepoy	British Indian Army	1927
	Jemadar	British Indian Army	1928
	Second Lieutenant	British Indian Army	29 January 1931 (seniority from 2 November 1927)
	Lieutenant	British Indian Army	1 April 1932 (seniority from 2 February 1930)
	Captain	British Indian Army	8 March 1937
	Major	British Indian Army	1941 (acting); 1 May 1942 (temporary); 2 November 1944 (substantive)
	Lieutenant-Colonel	British Indian Army	1945 (temporary); 14 July 1946 (war-substantive)
	Colonel	British Indian Army	14 July 1946 (acting)
	Major	Indian Army	15 August 1947 (Note: Upon independence in 1947, India became a Dominion within the British Commonwealth of Nations. As a result, the rank insignia of the British Army, incorporating the Tudor Crown and four-pointed Bath Star ("pip"), was retained, as George VI remained Commander-in-Chief of the Indian Armed Forces. After 26 January 1950, when India became a republic, the President of India became Commander-in-Chief, and the Ashoka Lion replaced the crown, with a five-pointed star being substituted for the "pip.")
	Brigadier	Indian Army	1947 (acting); 2 November 1948 (temporary); 1 January 1950 (substantive)
	Major-General	Indian Army	5 August 1949 (acting)
	Brigadier	Indian Army	26 January 1950 (recommissioning and change in insignia)
	Major General	Indian Army	posthumous, with effect from 1 March 1952
