= Anita Dongre =

Indian fashion designer

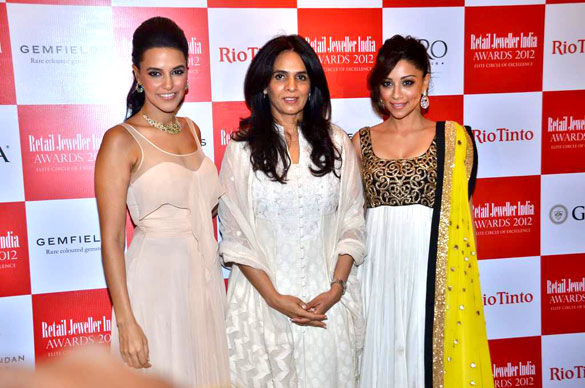
- Dongre in 2015
- Born: 3 October 1963 (age 62); Bandra, West Mumbai, India
- Education: Fashion design SNDT Women's University in Mumbai 1998
- Occupation: Fashion designer
- Children: Yash Dongre
- Website: www.anitadongre.com

Anita Dongre (née Sawlani) (born 3 October 1963) is an Indian fashion designer. She is the founder of House of Anita Dongre, an Indian fashion house.

== Early life ==
Dongre was born in Mumbai, in the state of Maharashtra. Her mother, Pushpa Sawlani, used to stitch clothes for Anita and her 5 siblings when they were kids. Later in life, Anita studied fashion design at Premlila Vithaldas Polytechnic, SNDT Women's University located in Mumbai. She pursued a Degree course in Fashion designing while displaying her love for designing clothes through different campaigns.

== Career ==
Dongre launched her jewellery brand Anita Dongre Pink City, which also features under House of Anita Dongre.

In the year 2015, AND Designs India Limited re-branded itself as House of Anita Dongre. House of Anita Dongre currently shelters AND (western wear), Global Desi (boho-chic brand inspired by the folk tales of India), and her signature label ANITA DONGRE. She has recently introduced Anita Dongre Grassroot to her fashion house. She is also the founder of Pink City, a jadau fine jewellery brand.

On 28 March 2019, the Board of House of Anita Dongre Limited (HOADL), as part of its corporate restructuring, transferred the businesses under its two brands, AND and Global Desi under a slump sale arrangement to a newly formed wholly owned subsidiary, Ochre and Black Private Limited (OBPL) - effective 1 April 2019. HOADL will continue to manage the business under its two brands - Anita Dongre and Grassroot.

Dongre's brother and sister handle the operations of the business, while she focuses on the design front. She features as the chief creative officer of the company.

== Personal life ==
Anita Dongre is married to Pravin Dongre, a businessman and has a son named Yash Dongre, who is also a part of Dongre's business.

Dongre is a vegan activist and a member of the organisation People for the Ethical Treatment of Animals (PETA).

== Awards and recognitions ==
- In 2008, she received the GR8 Flo Women Achievers Award for 'Excellence in Fashion Design'.
- In 2013, The Federation of Indian Chambers of Commerce and Industry Ladies Organization, Bombay Chapter, presented an award to Dongre for 'Excellence in Fashion Design'.
- In 2014, she received the EY Entrepreneur of the year award.
- She received the Pantene Shine Award for helping women shine.
- In 2017, Vogue and Yes Bank awarded her the title of 'Designer of the Year.'
- In 2019, Anita Dongre received the Lokmat 'Most Stylish' award.
- In 2023, she received 'Forces of Fashion' award from Vogue.
