= Param Vir Chakra =

India's highest military decoration

- Param Vir Chakra and its ribbon
- Type: Military award
- Country: India
- Presented by: the President of India
- Post-nominals: PVC
- Status: Active
- Established: 26 January 1950; 76 years ago
- First award: 3 November 1947 (Note: The Param Vir Chakra was established on 26 January 1950 (Republic Day of India) by the President of India, but went into effect on 15 August 1947.)
- Final award: 7 July 1999

Highlights
- Total: 21
- Total awarded posthumously: 14
- Total recipients: 21

Precedence
- Next (higher): Bharat Ratna

- Equivalent: Ashoka Chakra (Note: Though the Ashoka Chakra is placed below the Param Vir Chakra in precedence, it is considered as a peacetime equivalent to Param Vir Chakra.)

- Next (lower): Padma Vibhushan

The Param Vir Chakra (PVC) is India's highest military decoration, awarded for displaying distinguished acts of valour during wartime. Param Vir Chakra translates roughly as the "Wheel of Supreme Brave", and the award is granted for "most conspicuous bravery in the presence of the enemy". As of January 2018, the medal has been awarded 21 times, of which 14 were posthumous and 16 arose from actions in Indo-Pakistani conflicts. Of the 21 awardees, 20 have been from the Indian Army and one has been from the Indian Air Force. Major Somnath Sharma was the first recipient. A number of state governments of India as well as ministries of the central government provide allowances and rewards to recipients of the PVC (or their family members in case of the recipient's death).

The history of present-day Indian gallantry awards can be traced back to the rule of the East India Company, when the first formal award was instituted by Lord William Bentinck in 1834 as the Order of Merit, later renamed the Indian Order of Merit in 1902. During the First World War, the British awards system was adopted and continued through the Second World War. Post-independence, new awards were instituted on 26 January 1950, with retroactive effect from 15 August 1947. The PVC is equivalent to the Victoria Cross in the United Kingdom and the Medal of Honor in the United States.

== History ==
The history of modern-day Indian gallantry awards can be traced back to the rule of the East India Company. Gold medals were awarded to Indian officers for the first time in 1795, with the first recipient being Subedar Abdul Kader of the 5th Madras Native Infantry. The chain of the gold medal awarded to Kader was inscribed with the words "For Conduct and Courage on All Occasions". In 1834 the Order of Merit was established by the then Governor-General of India, Lord William Bentinck. The decoration was renamed the Indian Order of Merit (IOM) in 1902, and Indians considered it to be "the most coveted gallantry award" until the Victoria Cross (VC)—the highest award for gallantry in the British Empire—was extended to Indians in 1911. The VC was awarded to 153 Indian and British soldiers of the British Indian Army, and civilians under its command, from 1857 until Indian independence in 1947.

During the First World War, in addition to the IOM, the award system of the British Indian Army was expanded. Based on the British practice for recognising actions of gallantry, senior officers would be awarded the Distinguished Service Order, junior officers the Military Cross, and enlisted men with the Military Medal. This system continued through the Second World War.

Post-independence, the British honours and awards system in India informally came to an end. A short time later, Prime Minister of India Jawaharlal Nehru decided to give gallantry awards for the ongoing conflict in Jammu and Kashmir. Although India and Pakistan still had the option to award British honours, the leaders felt that it would not make sense to give the same honour to personnel from opposing forces. Accordingly, in June 1948 it was decided to institute new Indian awards for gallantry: the Param Vir Chakra (PVC), Maha Vir Chakra (MVC), and Vir Chakra (VrC). After the PVC, the MVC and VrC are the second and third highest gallantry awards during wartime.

Nehru entrusted the implementation of the PVC to Major General Hira Lal Atal, the first Indian Adjutant general of India. He in turn requested Savitri Khanolkar, the wife of an Indian Army officer, Vikram Khanolkar of the Sikh Regiment, to design the medal for the PVC. Coincidentally, the first PVC would be awarded to Major Somnath Sharma, the brother-in-law of Khanolkar's daughter.

Despite gaining independence from British rule, India still remained a dominion of the United Kingdom. This meant that the Governor-General of India could not approve the establishment of the awards without assent from the British Crown. Therefore, a draft of the Royal Warrant was sent to London for approval by King George VI. However, by mid-1948 it became clear that the King's ratification would not be forthcoming for some time. As author Ian Cardozo suggests: "How could the King sanction awards for a war between two members of the Commonwealth? Also, the King would have not even have been a symbolic presence on the awards."

Therefore, the draft warrants to formally establish the new gallantry awards were not put into effect. On 1 January 1949, a ceasefire was implemented in Jammu and Kashmir, and as it was becoming too late to honour acts of heroism from the 1947–1948 Indo-Pakistani War, Nehru forwarded the draft warrants to Governor-General Chakravarti Rajagopalachari to "institute the awards as your own". However, Rajagopalachari felt that, as India was still a dominion, it would be inappropriate for him to establish the awards without the King's approval. He instead suggested to Nehru that, as India was to become a republic on 26 January 1950, it would be appropriate to announce the establishment of the awards on that date, but with retroactive effect from 15 August 1947.

On 26 January 1950, now celebrated as Republic Day of India, the PVC was established by Rajendra Prasad, the first President of India, with effect from 15 August 1947 (Independence Day of India). Provision was made in the event a PVC recipient was to receive a further award of the medal; if this were to arise, the recipient would receive a bar to their existing PVC, along with a gift of a replica of the vajra (club), the weapon of Indra, the god of heaven. As of January 2018, no instances of an individual being conferred with a second PVC have arisen. The medal carries with it the right to use "PVC" as a post-nominal.

== Regulations ==
The regulations of the PVC were set out in The Gazette of India the day the award was established, 26 January 1950, as follows:

First: The decoration shall be in form of a medal and styled and designated the Param Vir Chakra (hereinafter referred as the Chakra).

Second: The medal shall be circular in shape, made of bronze, one and three-eighth inches [35 mm] in diameter, and shall have embossed on the obverse, four replicas of Indra's Vajra with the state emblem embossed in the centre. On the reverse, it shall have embossed Param Vir Chakra, both in Hindi and English, with two lotus flowers between the inscriptions. A sealed pattern of the decoration shall be deposited and kept.

Third: The medal shall be suspended from the left breast by a plain purple-coloured ribbon of one and a quarter inches [32 mm] in width; on those occasions when only the ribbon is worn, a replica of Indra's Vajra in miniature shall be fixed in the centre of the ribbon.

Fourth: The Chakra is awarded for most conspicuous bravery or some daring or pre-eminent act of valour or self sacrifice, in the presence of the enemy, whether on land, at sea, or in the air.

Fifth: The Chakra may also be awarded posthumously.

Sixth: The distinction shall be conferred by the President.

Seventh: The names of those persons upon or on account of whom the decoration may be conferred shall be published in The Gazette of India, and a Register thereof kept under the directions of the President.

Eighth:

(a) Officers, men and women of all ranks of the Army, the Navy and the Air Force, of any of the Reserve Forces, of the Territorial Army, Militia and of any other lawfully constituted Armed Forces.

(b) Matrons, Sisters, Nurses and the staff of the Nursing Services and other Services pertaining to Hospitals and Nursing and Civilians of either sex serving regularly or temporarily under the orders, directions or supervision of any of the above-mentioned Forces.

Ninth: If any recipient of the Chakra shall again perform such an act of bravery as would have made him or her eligible to receive the Chakra, such further act of bravery shall be recorded by a bar to be attached to the ribbon by which the Chakra is suspended, and for every such additional act of bravery an additional bar shall be added, and any such bar or bars may also be awarded posthumously. For every bar awarded, a replica of Indra's Vajra in miniature shall be added to the ribbon when worn alone.

Tenth: The miniature decoration, which may be worn on certain occasions by those to whom the decoration is awarded, shall be half the size of the Chakra and a sealed pattern of the said miniature decoration shall be deposited and kept.

Eleventh: Every recipient of the Chakra being or ranking junior in rank to that of Sub-Lieutenant in the case of the Navy, Second Lieutenant in the case of the Army, and Pilot Officer in the case of the Air Force, shall, from the date of the act by which the decoration has been gained, be entitled to a special pension, and each additional bar shall carry with it additional pension for life at such rates as the President may prescribe. On the death of the recipient of the Chakra to whom the clause applies, the pension shall be continued to his widow until her death or remarriage under such rules as may be prescribed by the President.

Twelfth: This Chakra shall rank first among all awards.

Thirteenth: The President may cancel and annul the award of the Chakra to any person together with any pension appertaining thereto not already paid, and thereupon his or her name in the register shall be erased and he or she shall be required to surrender his or her insignia; but it shall be competent for the President to restore the decoration when such cancellation and annulment has subsequently been withdrawn, and with it such pension as may have been forfeited.

Last: Notice of cancellation or restoration in every case shall be published in The Gazette of India.

An amendment to the above regulations on 26 January 1980 saw Clause 12 deleted, and the remaining clauses renumbered accordingly.

== Design specifications ==
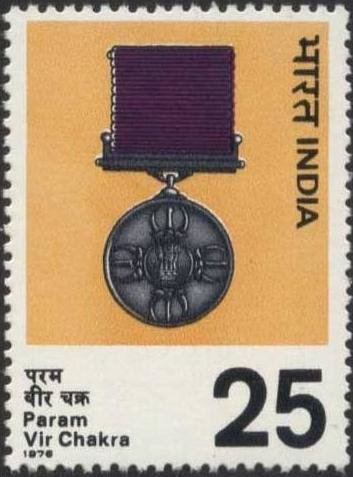
PVC medal on 1976 stamp of India

The name of the award translates as the "Wheel of the Ultimate Brave". The medal is a circular bronze disc 35 millimetres (1 3/8 inches) in diameter. On the obverse, or front, the National Emblem of India appears in the centre on a raised circle surrounded by four copies of the vajra, the weapon of Indra, the ancient Vedic king of the gods. The motif symbolizes the sacrifice of Rishi Dadhichi, who gave his bones to the gods to make the vajra to kill the demon Vritra. The medal is suspended from a straight-swiveling suspension bar. On the reverse, around a plain centre, are two legends separated by lotus flowers. The words "Param Vir Chakra" are written in Hindi and English. A purple ribbon, 32 millimetres (1 1/4 in) long, holds the Param Vir Chakra.

== Recipients ==
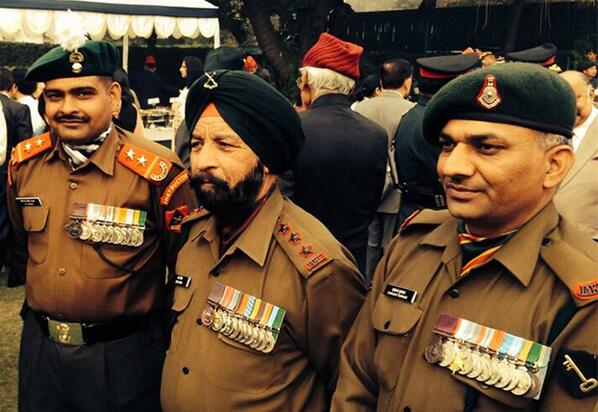
The three living recipients of the Param Vir Chakra: Yogendra Singh Yadav, Bana Singh, and Sanjay Kumar

The PVC has been awarded 21 times, of which 14 were awarded posthumously and 16 arose from actions in Indo-Pakistani conflicts. Of the 21 awardees, 20 have been from the Indian Army, and one has been from the Indian Air Force. The Grenadiers, with three awards, have received the greatest number of Param Vir Chakras. The various Gorkha Rifle regiments of the Indian Army have received three awards, with the 1, 8, and 11 Gorkha Rifle regiments each having one PVC recipient.

As of January 2018, Flying Officer Nirmal Jit Singh Sekhon, who was awarded the Param Vir Chakra posthumously in 1971, is the only Indian Air Force officer to have been honoured with the medal. Subedar Major Bana Singh, Subedar Sanjay Kumar and Subedar Yogendra Singh Yadav, are the only living recipients of the award.

* indicates that the Param Vir Chakra was awarded posthumously.

Bust of recipient	Name	Rank (Note: Rank refers to rank held at time of award.)	Unit	Date of action	Conflict	Place of action	Refs.
	Somnath Sharma	Major	Kumaon Regiment	3 November 1947*	Battle of Badgam	Badgam, Jammu and Kashmir, India	
	Jadunath Singh	Naik	Rajput Regiment	6 February 1948*	Indo-Pakistani War of 1947	Naushera, Jammu and Kashmir, India	
	Rama Raghoba Rane	Second Lieutenant	Bombay Sappers	8 April 1948	Indo-Pakistani War of 1947	Naushera, Jammu and Kashmir, India	
	Piru Singh	Company Havildar Major	Rajputana Rifles	17 July 1948*	Indo-Pakistani War of 1947	Tithwal, Jammu and Kashmir, India	
	Karam Singh	Lance Naik	Sikh Regiment	13 October 1948	Indo-Pakistani War of 1947	Tithwal, Jammu and Kashmir, India	
	Gurbachan Singh Salaria	Captain	1 Gorkha Rifles (Note: Attached to the United Nations Peace Keeping Force stationed in Congo.)	5 December 1961*	Congo Crisis	Élisabethville, Katanga, Congo	
	Dhan Singh Thapa	Major	8 Gorkha Rifles	20 October 1962	Sino-Indian War	Ladakh, Jammu and Kashmir, India	
	Joginder Singh	Subedar	Sikh Regiment	23 October 1962*	Sino-Indian War	Tongpen La, North-East Frontier Agency, India	
	Shaitan Singh	Major	Kumaon Regiment	18 November 1962*	Sino-Indian War	Rezang La, Jammu and Kashmir, India	
	Abdul Hamid	Company Quarter Master Havildar	The Grenadiers	10 September 1965*	Battle of Asal Uttar	Khemkaran, India	
	Ardeshir Tarapore	Lieutenant Colonel	Poona Horse	11 September 1965*	Battle of Chawinda	Phillora, Sialkot, Pakistan	
	Albert Ekka	Lance Naik	Brigade of the Guards	3 December 1971*	Battle of Hilli	Gangasagar, Agartala, India	
	Nirmal Jit Singh Sekhon	Flying Officer	No. 18 Squadron IAF	14 December 1971*	Indo-Pakistani War of 1971	Srinagar, Jammu and Kashmir, India	
	Arun Khetarpal	Second Lieutenant	Poona Horse	16 December 1971*	Battle of Basantar	Barapind-Jarpal, Shakargarh, Pakistan	
	Hoshiar Singh Dahiya	Major	The Grenadiers	17 December 1971	Battle of Basantar	Basantar River, Shakargarh, Pakistan	
	Bana Singh	Naib Subedar	Jammu and Kashmir Light Infantry	23 May 1987	Operation Rajiv	Siachen Glacier, Jammu and Kashmir, India	
	Ramaswamy Parameshwaran	Major	Mahar Regiment (Note: Attached to the Indian Peace Keeping Force stationed in Sri Lanka.)	25 November 1987*	Operation Pawan	Sri Lanka	
	Manoj Kumar Pandey	Lieutenant	11 Gorkha Rifles	3 July 1999*	Operation Vijay	Khaluber /Juber Top, Jammu and Kashmir, India	
	Yogendra Singh Yadav	Grenadier	The Grenadiers	4 July 1999	Operation Vijay	Tiger Hill, Jammu and Kashmir, India	
	Sanjay Kumar	Rifleman	Jammu and Kashmir Rifles	5 July 1999	Operation Vijay	Kargil, Jammu and Kashmir, India	
	Vikram Batra	Captain	Jammu and Kashmir Rifles	7 July 1999*	Operation Vijay	Kargil, Jammu and Kashmir, India	

== Allowances and Benefits provided for the recipients ==
The PVC also carries a cash allowance for those under the rank of lieutenant (or the appropriate service equivalent), and in some cases a cash award. Upon the death of the recipient, the pension is transferred to the spouse until their death or remarriage. In the case of a posthumous recipient who is unmarried, the allowance is paid to their parents. In the case of the award being conferred posthumously on a widow or widower, the allowance is to be paid to their son or unmarried daughter. A monthly stipend of ₹20,000 is given to the awardee along with their regular pay. The award amount and pension benefits are exempted from income tax. In addition, different ministries under the central government have various financial awards for PVC awardees.

Monetary allowance of ₹ 20,000 per month (enhanced from ₹ 10000 per month in 2017) is sanctioned to recipients irrespective of rank and income. The allowance is admissible to the recipient and upon their death is carried forward to the lawfully married widow. Each and extra bar to the decoration will carry the same amount as admissible to the original award.

Exempt from deduction of Income Tax According to sub-clause (i) of clause (18) of Section 10 of the Income-Tax Act, 1961 (43 of 1961) of 07.02.2014 any Income by way of pension received by an individual who has been in the service of the Central Government or State Government and recipient of Chakra series medal is Exempt from deduction of Income Tax after satisfying himself about the veracity of the claim.

Free Train travel facility Indian Railways issues complementary Railway passes enabling the recipients and their companion to travel from any railway station to any railway station. As mentioned in 18/2014 E(W)2008/PS5-6/8 of 07.02.2014 they are entitled to life long free travel in 1st Ac/ Executive class for self and a companion over all Indian railway trains (except Kolkata Metro) inclusive of Rajadhani, Shatabthi and Durunto trains.

Exempted from payment of Toll fee Ministry of Road Transport and Highways (MoRTH) vide National Highways Fee (Determination of Rates and Collection) Rules, 2008 has notified that chakra series gallantry medal recipients are exempted from payment of user fee even if recipient is traveling in personal vehicle, if such awardee produces ID card issued and authenticated by competent authority.

Discount on air travel through Indian Airlines recipients of qualifying Level I & II gallantry awards (PVC, MVC, AC, KC) receive a 75% discount on domestic air travel through Indian Airlines based on guidelines issued via Indian Airlines Commercial HQ circulars issued in July 2001 (specifically Letter No. HCD/8R/260, Circular No. 1385/R&T.

State specific grants such as Cash in lieu of land, land, or a one time lump sum grant or monthly annuity are announced as a reward by state governments to the recipients based on their domicile. These vary from ₹2.25 crore (in Telangana) to ₹10 to ₹50 lakhs in smaller states.

A relatively unknown convention in the Indian Army is for a PVC recipient to be saluted, when in ceremonial uniform, by everyone in the Army irrespective of rank, although no legal provision exists.

=== Allowances by state governments ===
Many Indian states have established individual pension rewards that far exceed the central government's stipend for recipients of the PVC.

Cash amount	States awarding
₹20.25 million (US$220,000)	Telangana
₹20 million (US$210,000)	Andhra Pradesh, Pujnab
₹2.5 million (US$27,000)	Assam; Chandigarh; Chhattisgarh; Delhi; Goa; Himachal Pradesh; Kerala; Maharashtra; Uttar Pradesh; Uttarakhand
₹2 million (US$21,000)	Rajasthan; Madhya Pradesh
₹1.5 million (US$16,000)	Tamil Nadu; Mizoram
₹1 million (US$11,000)	Jharkhand; Bihar
₹22,500 (US$240)	Gujarat; Jammu and Kashmir; Karnataka; Odisha; Sikkim; West Bengal

== Memorials ==
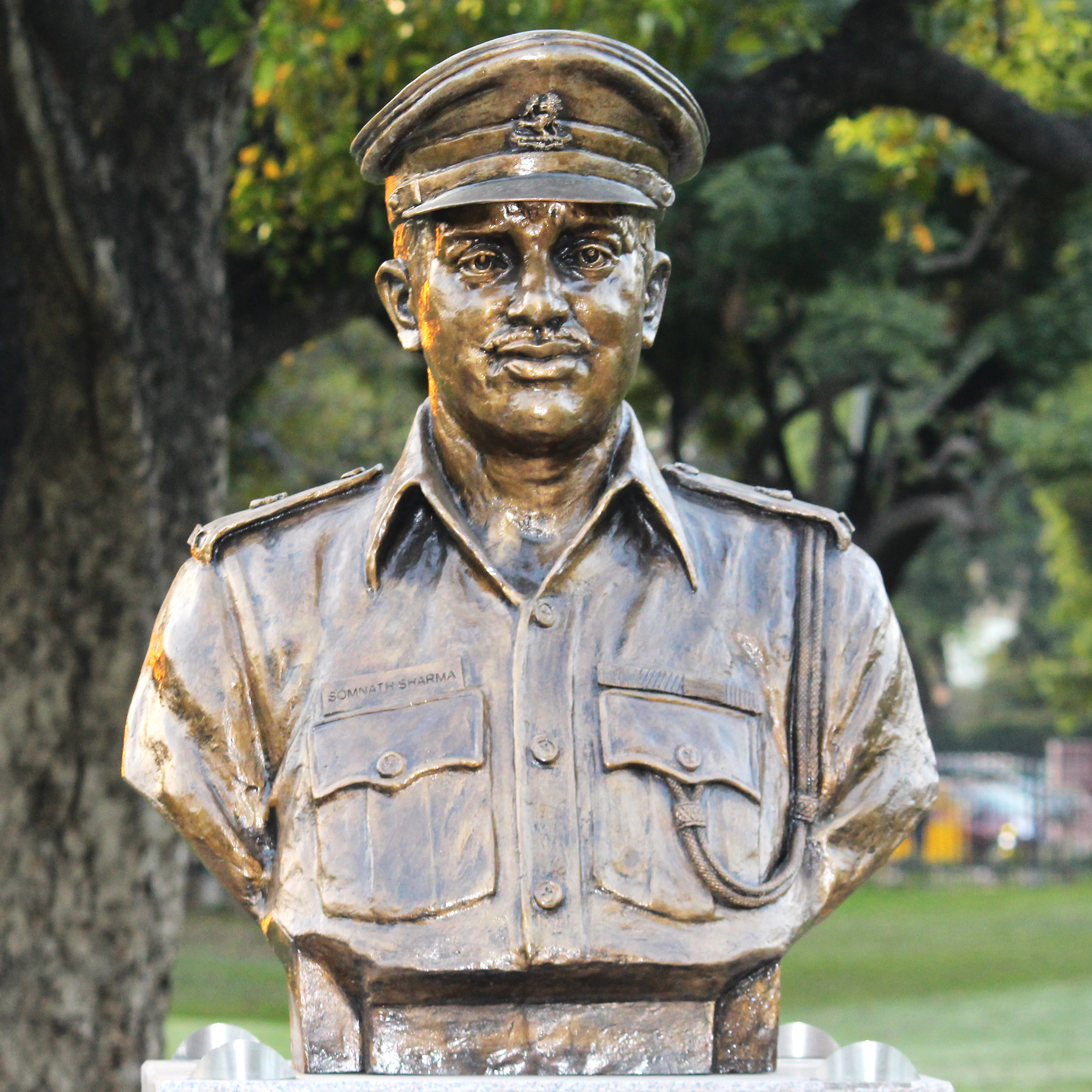
Major Somnath Sharma's statue at Param Yodha Sthal, National War Memorial, New Delhi

In 2009 Balidan Stambh, the war memorial in Jammu paid tribute to nine Param Vir Chakra awardees who attained martyrdom in Jammu and Kashmir by inscribing their name on the pillars erected in semi circumference for the respective wars in which they participated. Their names are displayed near the eternal flame and as relief mural on the semi circumference wall.

In September 2014 a memorial was built in the memory of PVC recipients at Marina Park, Port Blair, in Andaman and Nicobar Islands. It was inaugurated by the Lieutenant Governor of Andaman and Nicobar Lieutenant General Ajay Kumar Singh, in the presence of the Commander-in-Chief Andaman and Nicobar Command, Vice Admiral Pradeep Kumar Chatterjee.

On 2 May 2017, at a ceremony conducted in the National Media Center, New Delhi, Minister of State for Defence Subhash Bhamre inaugurated a campaign to build a "wall of valour" in a thousand educational institutions across the country. The campaign was initiated by the two serving receipts of PVC, Subedar Yogendra Singh Yadav and Naib Subedar Sanjay Kumar. The campaign was named "Vidya Veerta Abhiyan". The objective is to build a wall of 4.5 by 6 metres (15 by 20 ft) at various educational campuses with the voluntary contributions from the students and the faculty of respective institutions. These walls are to portray all 21 recipients of the PVC along with relevant information.

In 2019 Bronze Busts of all 21 recipients were installed in the Param Yodha Sthal, which is a part of the National War Memorial. The site is adjacent to the main memorial and has informative plaques displaying the citations of the heroes.

On January 23, 2023 (birth anniversary of Subhash Chandra Bose), the Indian government named 21 large uncharted islands in the Andaman Islands after the 21 recipients of the Param Vir Chakra.

== In popular culture ==
The TV series Param Vir Chakra (1990), which focuses on the lives of Param Vir Chakra winners, was directed by Chetan Anand. The first episode of the series featured the first recipient of the award, Major Somnath Sharma of the Kumaon Regiment.

The Bollywood film LOC Kargil (2003) gives an account of all of the PVC recipients from the Kargil War. Lieutenant Manoj Kumar Pandey is played by Ajay Devgan, Subedar Major (Hony Capt) Yogendra Singh Yadav is played by Manoj Bajpayee, Subedar Major Sanjay Kumar is played by Sunil Shetty, and Captain Vikram Batra is played by Abhishek Bachchan.

A graphic novel titled Param Vir Chakra by Amar Chitra Katha, a comic book released in 2015 featuring 21 dedicated and concise stories.

Indian Punjabi-language biopic movie Subedar Joginder Singh (2018) is based on Singh's life and his action during Sino-Indian War.

A series of 14 graphic novels titled Param Vir Chakra Name of Awardees by Roli Books written by Ian Cardozo and drawn by Rishi Kumar in 2019.

In the 2021 film Shershaah, Sidharth Malhotra played Vikram Batra in a biopic directed by Vishnuvardhan.

The Hindi-language film Ikkis focusses on the life on Arun Khetarpal, who was the youngest recipient of the award. It was released on 1 January 2026.

== See also ==
- List of highest military decorations by country
