= Navy Children School, Delhi =

Coordinates: 28.5823°N 77.1944°E

Navy Children School Delhi
- Chanakyapuri; New Delhi; India

Information
- Type: Semi Private
- Motto: Knowledge is the Only Good
- Established: 2 August 1965
- Principal: Oshima Mathur
- Grades: Class KG – 12
- Campus size: 5-acre (20,000 m^{2})
- Affiliation: CBSE
- Website: ncsdelhi.nesnavy.in

The Navy Children School of Delhi, India, was established in 1965 and is the flagship of the Naval Public Schools system set up by the Navy Education Society. Ages range from nursery to class XII level.

The school was named Naval Primary School, and situated on navy grounds in Chanakyapuri with students aged from nursery to Class III. Mrs. A.K. Chatterjee, wife of the then Chief of Naval Staff, Vice Admiral (later Admiral) Chatterjee, was the first principal of the school, leading a small group of lady teachers; Mrs. Narasimhan was vice-principal. Other pioneer teachers included Mrs. Krishnaswamy and Mrs. Rana. The teachers were drawn from the ranks of NOWA (the Naval Officer's Wives Association) and from the ranks of the surrounding communities.

Classes were small, with the senior most class in 1966, Class IV, with seven students enrolled at the beginning of 1966. The student body was drawn from the Governmental housing colonies of Satya Marg, Vinay Marg, Sarojini Nagar and Nauroji Nagar. The curriculum followed the standard curriculum for the Senior Cambridge/Indian Schools Certificate schools, essentially the same as the 'O' level track primary school curriculum in the UK. Subjects included English, Hindi, Arithmetic, Geography, History, Nature Studies and Moral Science, with senior classes adding Civics, Geometry and Algebra to the curriculum in Class V.

The school occupied the main building of the Naval Grounds in Chanakyapuri, which was adjacent to junior officers' flats. In the winter months preceding Republic Day (26 January) the grounds also accommodated a large tented encampment of Navy ratings, who used the school football grounds to rehearse for the Republic Day parade.

There are Navy Children Schools in Port Blair, Goa, Kochi, Vizag, Mumbai, Arakkonam, Coimbatore, Karanja, Ezhimala, Karwar, Porbander and Dholakpur.

== History ==
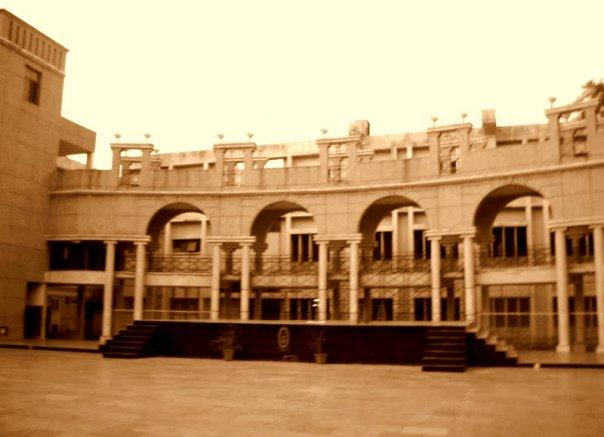
Navy Children School

The Navy Children School earlier known as The Naval Public School was established on 2 August 1965. It began in one big hall. Naval Public School joined hands with Nathanian school which was being run in the present lawn area. It began as a primary school with approximately 600 children. The hall was divided into two where both LKG and UKG students were accommodated. One facilitator and one office staff helped to run the school.

Today NCS is a school in the chain of Navy Children Schools under the auspices of the Navy Education Society. It is administered by a Managing Committee set up in accordance with the Delhi School Education Act, 1973.

== Objective ==
The school's objective is to provide education geared to the National Objectives, as envisaged in the National Policy of Education, 1986.

== Facilities ==
Laboratory There are laboratories for Biology, Physics, Chemistry, Geography and Mathematics. The school also has an Atal Tinkering Lab and Language Lab.

Computer Labs The school has three computer labs equipped with the multimedia machines for students from KG to XII . Computer Aided Learning (CAL) packages are used like Extra Marks. These are computer based teaching systems which involve capsules on subjects which are displayed on smart boards through networked computers installed in all classrooms.

Audio visual room The school has an audio visual room with a collection of audio-video cassettes/CDs to be used as aids. Bhartiya Vidya and Eureka capsules are available.

Amphitheater The open-air red stone structure is for competitions and workshops.

Auditorium The school has an auditorium with sound-proofing and projector, for activities and workshops.

Special Educator and Counselor Support for emotional, behavioural, interpersonal and academic problems, and to help to children with special needs.

Cafeteria The school cafeteria runs on eco-friendly standards.

Sports Games and sports are a part of the daily routine, as with the NCC.

MI Room Sick children seek assistance in the MI Room of the school. Height, weight and eye tests are done.

Library The school has two libraries.

Book/Tailor Shop Students can buy stationery and uniforms at discounted prices.

== House system ==
The school has a house system aimed at fostering team spirit and competition among students. The students are divided into four Houses – Himgiri, Nilgiri, Udaigiri and Vikrant. Each house is headed by a captain, as well as vice captain and a member of the staff acts as a House Warden. All house activities and most school functions are organised by the House Coordinator, assisted by the Associate Coordinators.

== Activities ==
The school has activities and competitions spread out throughout the year. A few important events are The Annual Day, and the 5 km cross-country run known as Road Run. Every year school organises a model United nations conference namely NAVY CHILDREN SCHOOL MODEL UNITED NATIONS CONFERENCE (NCSMUN) where children from different school participate dealing in debate on international issues.

Every year the school celebrates its annual day.

== Buildings ==
The school has four blocks – Tagore, Raman, Ashok, Kalam,

== Notable alumni ==
- Neha Dhupia, actress, former Miss India
- Raghav Sachar, music director
- Sidharth Malhotra, actor, model
