= Tiger Hill (Kargil) =

Mountain in Ladakh, site of wartime battle

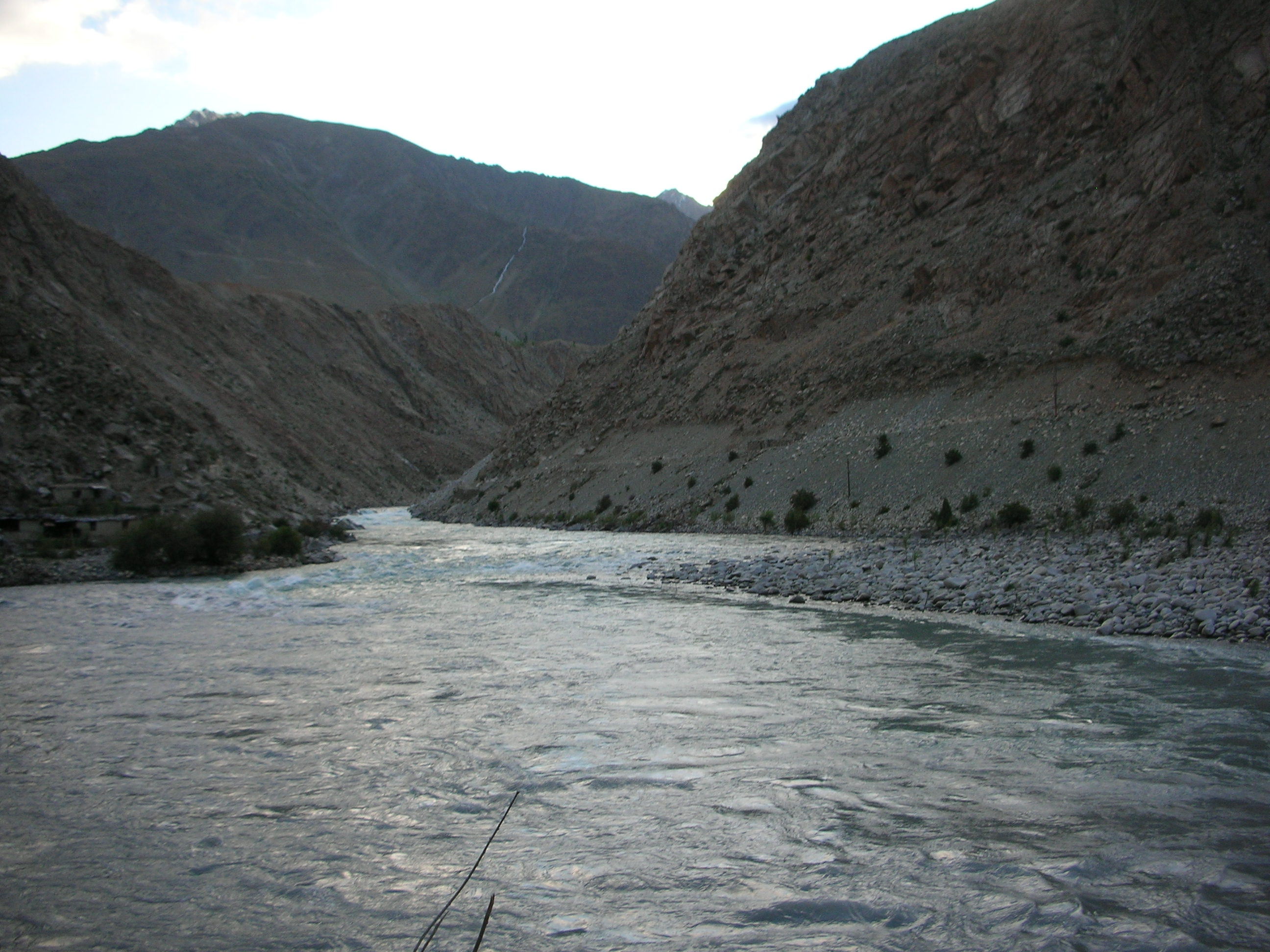
- Tiger hill (highest mountain seen in the background) as seen from the River Drass in Kargil.

Highest point
- Elevation: 5,062 m (16,608 ft)
- Coordinates: 34°29′03.8″N 75°39′30.2″E

Geography
- Location within Ladakh Location within India
- Location: Drass, Ladakh, India
- Parent range: The Himalayas

Tiger Hill (also called Point 5062) is a mountain in the Drass-Kargil area of Ladakh, India. It is one of the highest peaks in the area and was the subject of a battle during the 1999 Kargil War, PVC Yogendra Singh Yadav called hero of tiger hill.

== Strategic relevance ==
Since Tiger Hill is the highest peak in the sector, it overlooks National Highway 1 that connects Srinagar to Kargil, and is the main supply route of the Kargil sector. Any enemy atop the peak would have a direct line of sight onto the headquarters of India's 56 Brigade, the main Indian unit in the area, and as well as a 25 km stretch of highway, thus hindering the movement of troops and supplies. The peak also offered a surveillance point onto other nearby peaks.

== Battle ==
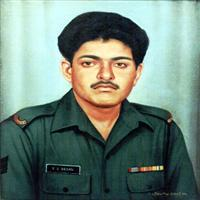
Portrait of Havildar Yadav

Tiger Hill was illegally captured by elements of the Pakistan Army's Northern Light Infantry during Kargil War. The 8th battalion, Sikh Regiment (8 Sikh) attempted to regain Tiger Hill in late May 1999, but they were unsuccessful. Further attempts to regain were also repulsed, and Indian troops dug in around the hill. The final attempt began on 3 July at 17:15 with an artillery bombardment. 8 Sikh advanced up the left flank of the mountain, the 2nd Battalion, Naga Regiment (2 Naga) advanced up the right flank, and 200 troops from the Ghatak platoon, Alpha and Charlie Companies of the 18th Battalion, The Grenadiers (18 Grenadiers) scaled a 1,000-foot vertical cliff on the rear side of the mountain. After days of heavy fighting on the peak, 18 Grenadiers seized the mountaintop on the morning of 8 July.
