= Sunil Kumar Choudhary =

Recipient of Kirti Chakra

Captain Sunil Kumar Choudhary KC, SM
- Born: June 22, 1980; Kathua district
- Died: January 27, 2008 (aged 27); Tinsukia district
- Burial place: Kathua district
- Relatives: Lt. Col. P. L. Choudhary (father); Satya Choudhary (mother); Flying officer Ankur Chaudhary (brother)
- Military career
- Allegiance: India
- Branch: Gorkha regiments (Indian Army)
- Service years: 2004–2008
- Rank: Captain
- Nickname: Soni
- Service number: IC-64615
- Unit: 7/11 Gorkha Rifles
- Awards: Kirti Chakra (posthumous) & Sena Medal
- Memorials: Kathua district

Captain Sunil Kumar Choudhary (1980–2008) was an officer in the Gorkha regiment of the Indian Army and belonged to the 7/11 Gorkha Rifles. Choudhary served for three years and was awarded with Kirti Chakra (posthumous) and Sena Medal.

== Early life and education ==
Sunil Kumar Choudhary was born on 22 June 1980 in Kathua district in the Indian state of Jammu and Kashmir. His father, P. L. Choudhary, also served in the Indian Army and held the rank of lieutenant colonel. Choudhary was educated in the Kendriya Vidyalaya until secondary education and then attained undergraduate degree from Garware College of Commerce in Pune. He then completed a Master of Business Administration course from Savitribai Phule Pune University (Pune), India before joining the Indian army.

== Army service ==
While Choudhary was completing his MBA his younger brother, Ankur Chaudhary, was selected in National Defence Academy and was undergoing his training in Khadakwasla. In the training academy there was a statue of Captain Manoj Kumar Pandey, who was posthumously awarded India's highest military honor Param Vir Chakra. Pandey was also in the 11 Gorkha Rifles. Sunil Kumar Choudhary was inspired by Captain Manoj Kumar Pandey and dropped his MBA and joined the Indian Military Academy on 1 Jul 2003. After joining, he expressed a desire to be a part of 11 Gorkha Rifles. Upon passing out from the academy on 10 December 2004, Choudhary moved to Fort William, Kolkata and joined the Gorkha Rifles in February 2005. In May 2006, he was posted to Tinsukia district for counter-insurgency operations against the United Liberation Front of Assam (ULFA).

Choudhary killed two commanders of ULFA. Due to his services in Assam, he was awarded the Sena Medal on 26 Jan 2008.

== Death ==
On 27 January 2008 Choudhary was instructed to carry out an operation to encounter 7-9 ULFA militants who had taken shelter in two houses in the village Rangagarh. Choudhary led a team of three to attack the house with help from another attack team. He was shot in the chest by the militants but continued to fight and killed two militants. Choudhary died almost exactly 24 hours after he was awarded the Sena Medal for gallantry.

Choudhary was awarded Kirti Chakra posthumously.

== See also ==
- Manoj Kumar Pandey
