= Bhim Bahadur Dewan =

Indian Army soldier, recipient of the Vir Chakra (1961–1999)

Havildar (Indian Army) Bhim Bahadur Dewan VrC
- Born: 5 June 1961; Vill Namsaling, Ward No. 6, Sukrabare Bazar, Anchal: Mechi. (ILAM), Nepal
- Died: 3 July 1999 (aged 38); KIA at Batalik Sector, Kargil
- Children: 2
- Military career
- Allegiance: Republic of India
- Branch: Indian Army
- Rank: Havildar (Indian Army)
- Unit: 1/11 Gorkha Rifles
- Conflicts: Kargil War; Operation Vijay
- Awards: Vir Chakra

Havildar Bhim Bahadur Dewan was the leading section commander of 1/11 Gorkha Rifles under Captain Manoj Kumar Pandey, who was tasked to capture "Khalubar South" on 3 July 1999. He was posthumously awarded the Vir Chakra for his contribution in Operation Vijay against the Pakistani Army.

== Vir Chakra citation ==
The citation for the Vir Chakra reads as follows

Gazette Notification : 63 Pres/2000, 26.1.2000

Operation: - Date of Award: 26 Aug 2000

Citation:

Havildar Bhim Bahadur Dewan was the leading section commander under Captain Manoj Kumar Pandey, which was tasked to capture "Khalubar South" on 3 July 1999. After a long and tiring climb of seven hours the column reached the objective and came under fire from all surrounding heights including from area bunkers. Captain Pandey was tasked to clear the enemy position, which comprised a total of 6 bunkers. Havildar Bhim Bahadur Dewan's section was asked to assault the right two bunkers. Havildar Bhim Bahadur Dewan assaulted the first bunker by firing and lobbing grenades and killed two enemy personnel inside and thereafter moved on to the second bunker. He then led the assault onto the second bunker and after a firefight lasting over an hour he finally captured the bunker killing two enemy personnel. Havildar Bhim Bahadur Dewan was injured while clearing the second bunker but without caring for his grievous injury continued to exhort and inspire his section to clear the bunker. He finally succumbed to his injuries in the battlefield. During this operation the enemy suffered eleven dead and also left behind a large number of weapons and ammunition including two heavy machine guns, one 12.7 inch machine guns, three G3 Rifles, large quantity of ammunition, radio equipment and documents. Havildar Bhim Bahadur Dewan displayed courage and gallantry of the highest order in the true traditions of the Indian Army

== Legacy ==
In the movie LOC Kargil, he was portrayed by Bollywood actor Puru Raaj Kumar.
