= Puneet Nath Datt =

Second Lieutenant Puneet Nath Datt AC
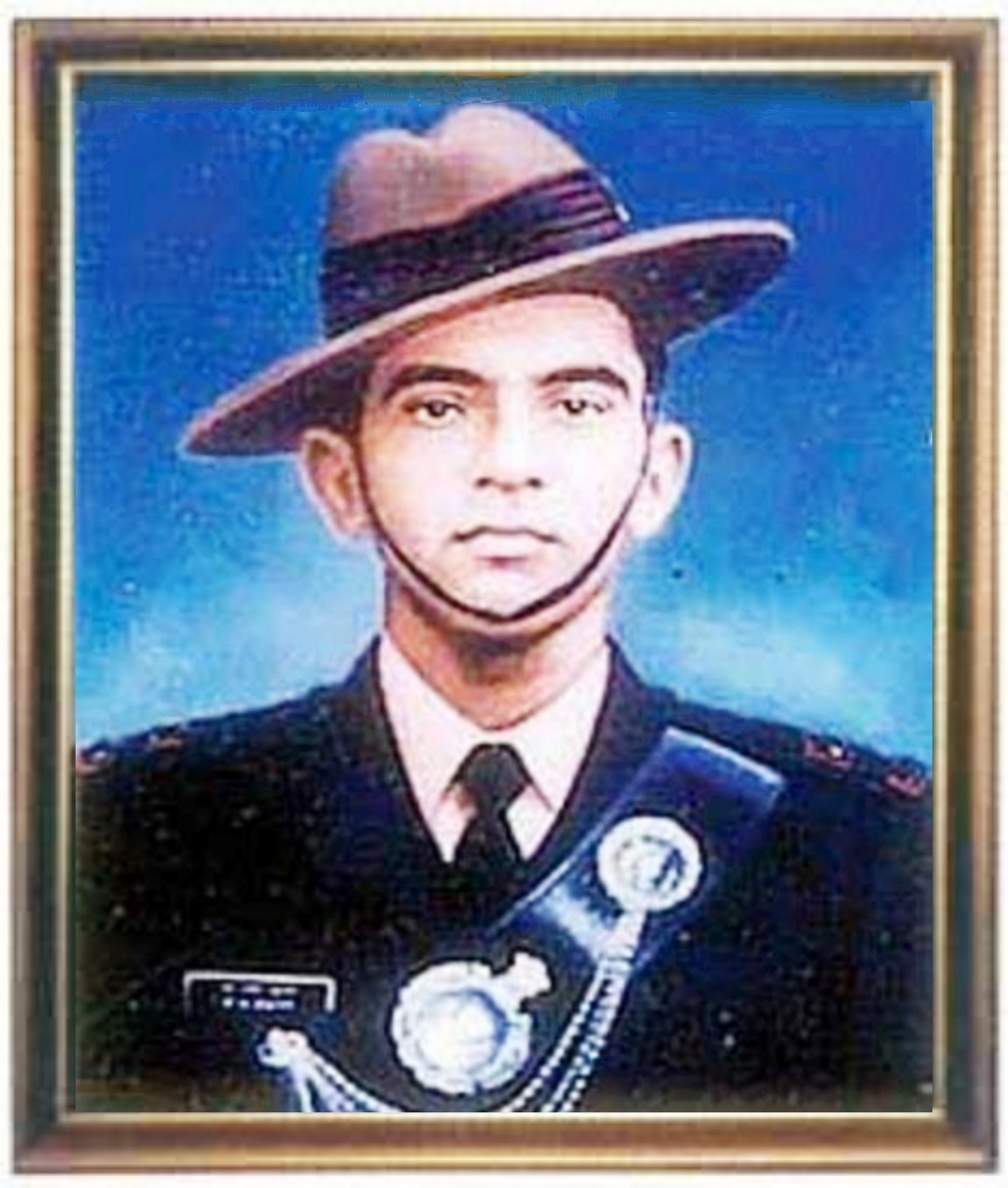
- Portrait of 2nd Lt Puneet Nath Datt
- Born: 29 April 1973; Jodhpur, Rajasthan, India
- Died: 20 July 1997 (aged 24); Naushera, Jammu and Kashmir, India
- Education: National Defence Academy
- Military career
- Allegiance: India
- Branch: Indian Army
- Service years: 9 December 1995 – 20 July 1997
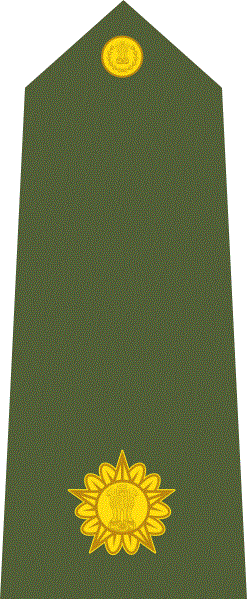
- Rank: Second Lieutenant
- Service number: IC- 53987X
- Unit: 1/11 Gorkha Rifles
- Awards: Ashoka Chakra

Second Lieutenant Puneet Nath Datt, AC (29 April 1973 – 20 July 1997) was an officer of the Indian Army's 11 Gorkha Rifles. He was posthumously awarded India's highest peacetime gallantry award, the Ashok Chakra, for bravery displayed in an Indian Army operation. The operation was conducted against terrorists hidden in a three-story building in the Nowshera area of Srinagar, Jammu and Kashmir.

== Early life ==
Puneet Nath Datt was born on 29 April 1973, in Jodhpur, Rajasthan. He completed his schooling at St. Bethany's School in Darjeeling, St. Joseph's Academy in Dehradun, St. Xavier's School in Jaipur, and attained his class XII from Tagore Public School in Jaipur.

As a child and while in high school, his ambition was to join the Indian Army, and he pursued it by preparing for entry into the renowned National Defence Academy. He secured entry into the NDA in December 1991. At the NDA, he had a brilliant record, and due to his proficiency in both academic & military subjects as well as outstanding officer-like qualities, he was awarded the coveted rank of 'Cadet Sergeant Major' for his 'Echo' squadron. As a Cadet Sergent Major, he won the prized Cross Country Shield for his squadron. He was also awarded three gold medals in rowing.

== Family ==
His father's name was Major Pramod Nath Datt, who also served in the 1/11 Gorkha Rifles. This inspired Datt to join the same regiment. His grandfather's name was Colonel S.N.C Bakshi, who also served in the Indian Army. While his uncle V. K. C. Bakhshi, was a Commander in the Indian Navy. He was posthumously awarded the Ashok Chakra which was received on his behalf by his mother, Anita Datt, from the President of India on 26 January 1998, India's Republic Day.

== Military career ==
Puneet Nath Datta was commissioned in the 1/11 Gorkha Rifles on 9 December 1995. He took part in an encounter that panned out as a cordon & search operation on specific information from a source cultivated by him regarding presence of foreign militants in a building in the Nowshera locality of Srinagar. The operation was started on 20 July 1997, and the building was completely surrounded by 0400 hours.

The militants were secure within the three-story building located in a densely populated and congested area. At daybreak when the terrorists found that they were surrounded, they resorted to indiscriminate firing. One militant ran out firing on the search party. Seeing the militant firing on his troops, he ordered his troops to take cover and sprang up and shot the militant in an eye-to-eye encounter while maneuvering his position to block the rear exit of the building.

The remaining militants inside the building continued firing on the troops, resulting in him being seriously wounded. He then lobbed a grenade inside the building, killing the remaining militants and destroying a considerable amount of the enemy's arms and ammunition. He attained martyrdom and immortalized himself by carving a niche in the annals of his Regiment and the Indian Army's history.

== Ashok Chakra awardee ==
Second Lieutenant Puneet Nath Datt was posthumously awarded the Ashoka Chakra, the India's highest peace time gallantry award on 15 August 1997.
