= Gorkha regiments (India) =

Regiment of the Indian Army

Men of the 2nd Battalion, 5th Gorkha Rifles (Frontier Force) of the Indian Army operating alongside soldiers from the 82nd Airborne Division of the US Army in 2013

At the time of India's Independence in 1947, as per the terms of the Britain–India–Nepal Tripartite Agreement, six Gorkha regiments of the British Indian Army were transferred to the Indian Army, where they have served ever since. These troops are mainly recruited from the ethnic hill communities of Nepal. After Independence, an additional regiment, the 7th Gorkha Rifles was formally re-raised in the Indian Army to accommodate the Gorkha soldiers of the 7th Gurkha Rifles and the 10th Gurkha Rifles who chose not to transfer to the British Army.

== History ==
=== Origins ===
Impressed by the fighting qualities displayed by the Gorkhas during the Gurkha War, Sir David Ochterlony was quick to realise the potential of the Gorkhas in the British Indian Army. Until then, Gorkha defectors were generally used as irregular forces. On 24 April 1815, the first battalion of the Gorkha Regiment, was raised as the Nasiri regiment. This regiment later became the 1st King George's Own Gurkha Rifles, and saw action at the Maulun fort under Lieutenant Lawtie.

They were instrumental in the expansion of the British East India Company throughout the subcontinent. The Gorkhas took part in the Gurkha-Sikh War, the First and Second Anglo-Sikh Wars, Afghan wars, and in suppressing the Indian Rebellion of 1857. Throughout these years, the British continued to recruit the Gorkhas and kept increasing the number of Gorkha regiments.

By the time First World War started, there were 10 Gorkha (spelt Gurkha at the time) regiments in the British Indian Army.

The Gorkha regiments played a major role as part of the Commonwealth armies during both World Wars seeing action from Monte Cassino in the west to Rangoon in the east, and earning extensive battle honours. During the North African campaign, the German Afrikakorps accorded respect to the Nepalese knife khukri-wielding Gorkhas.

=== Post independence of India ===
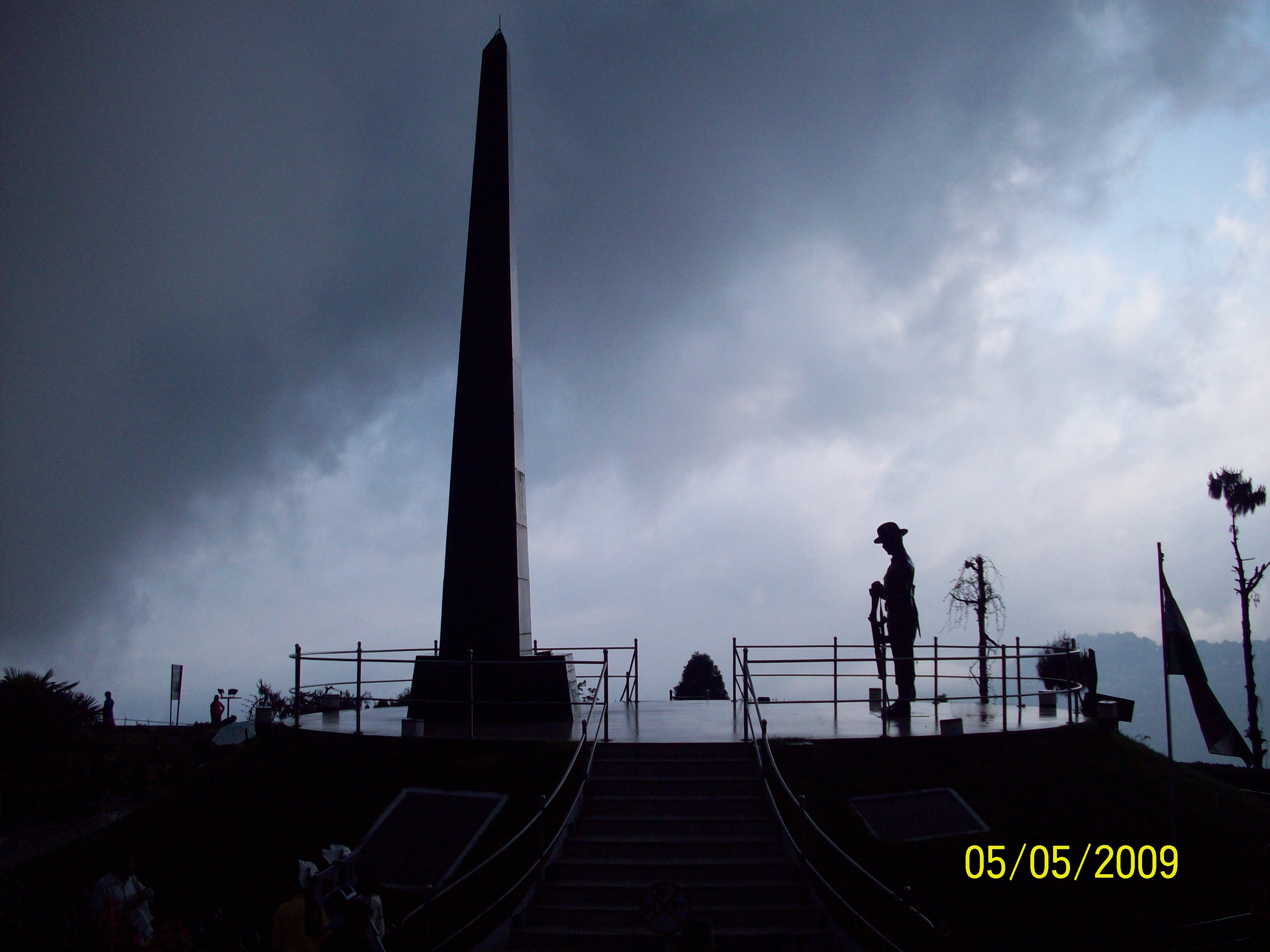
War memorial to slain Gorkha soldiers, Batasia Loop, Darjeeling.

Following India's independence, India, Nepal and Great Britain signed a Britain-India-Nepal Tripartite Agreement in 1947. Provision was made for six of the 10 Gorkha regiments in the British Indian Army to transfer to the new Indian Army. This agreement did not apply to Gurkhas employed in the Nepalese Army. As of 2020, India has 39 Gorkha battalions serving in 7 Gorkha regiments.

The four Gurkha regiments transferred to the British Army were posted to the remaining British colonies. In Malaya and Singapore, their presence was required in the Malayan Emergency, and they were to replace the Sikh unit in Singapore which reverted to the Indian Army on Indian independence. Those units in Malaya (Malaysia and Brunei) and Singapore, after these British colonies gained independence, are still part of Brunei and Singapore's armed forces respectively.

The six regiments incorporated in the new army of independent India were:

- 1st King George V's Own Gurkha Rifles (The Malaun Regiment)
- 3rd Queen Alexandra's Own Gurkha Rifles
- 4th Prince of Wales's Own Gurkha Rifles
- 5th Royal Gurkha Rifles (Frontier Force)
- 8th Gurkha Rifles
- 9th Gurkha Rifles

In 1949, the spelling of 'Gurkha' in the Indian Army was changed to the traditional 'Gorkha'. Upon India becoming a republic in 1950, all royal titles associated with the Indian Gorkha regiments were dropped.

Following the divisions of the Gorkha regiments, it was decided that transferring to the British Army would be a voluntary decision for the individual Gorkha soldiers affected. As a result, large numbers of men from the 7th Gurkha Rifles and the 10th Gurkha Rifles, which recruited predominantly from eastern Nepal, decided not to remain with their regiments when these became part of the British Army. In order to retain a contingent from this area of Nepal, the Indian Army made the decision to raise the 11 Gorkha Rifles. Although there was an ad hoc regiment with this number raised during World War 1 with troops drawn from the various existing Gurkha units, the troops mostly retained the uniform and insignias of their respective regiments (with a few exceptions who wore 11 GR badges, which were unofficial as no sanction was given for such). This regiment was disbanded in 1922 and has no relation to the present-day 11 Gurkha Rifles, despite claims to the contrary.

Since independence, the Gorkhas have fought in every major campaign involving the Indian Army, and have been awarded numerous battle and theatre honours. Gorkha regiments have won many gallantry awards, such as the Param Vir Chakra and the Maha Vir Chakra.

The 5th Battalion of the 5th Gorkha Rifles (Frontier Force), 5/5 GR (FF), fought gallantly in the Hyderabad police action in 1948, during which Nk. Nar Bahadur Thapa of 5/5 GR (FF) earned the first Ashok Chakra Class I of independent India on 15 September 1948. The 1st Battalion, 1/5 GR (FF), captured the Sehjra bulge fighting against a whole Pakistani battalion during the Indo-Pakistani War of 1971. The 4th Battalion, 4/5 GR (FF), fought in the Battle of Sylhet, earning the distinction of being the first regiment of the Indian Army to be involved in a heliborne attack. Under the Indian Army, Gorkhas have served in Bangladesh, Sri Lanka, Siachen, and in UN peacekeeping missions in Lebanon, Sudan, and Sierra Leone.

Major Dhan Singh Thapa of the 1st Battalion, 8 Gorkha Rifles, 1/8 GR, won the Param Vir Chakra for his heroic actions during the 1962 Sino-Indian conflict. The 1st Battalion of the 11th Gorkha Rifles, 1/11 GR, was involved in the Kargil War of 1999, where Lt. Manoj Kumar Pandey was posthumously awarded the Param Vir Chakra for gallantry. Lt. Hari Singh Bist of the 3rd Battalion of the 11th Gorkha Rifles was awarded a Shaurya Chakra posthumously for his bravery in a close combat encounter with JeM terrorists in Mendhar in Kashmir. Lt. Bist and his patrol party had acquired information that a group of terrorists were hiding in a village hut. On receiving the intelligence, Lt. Bist volunteered to conduct further surveillance. During the actual encounter, Lt. Bist killed five militants, but was shot five times in the process.

== Structure ==
=== Current regimental strength ===
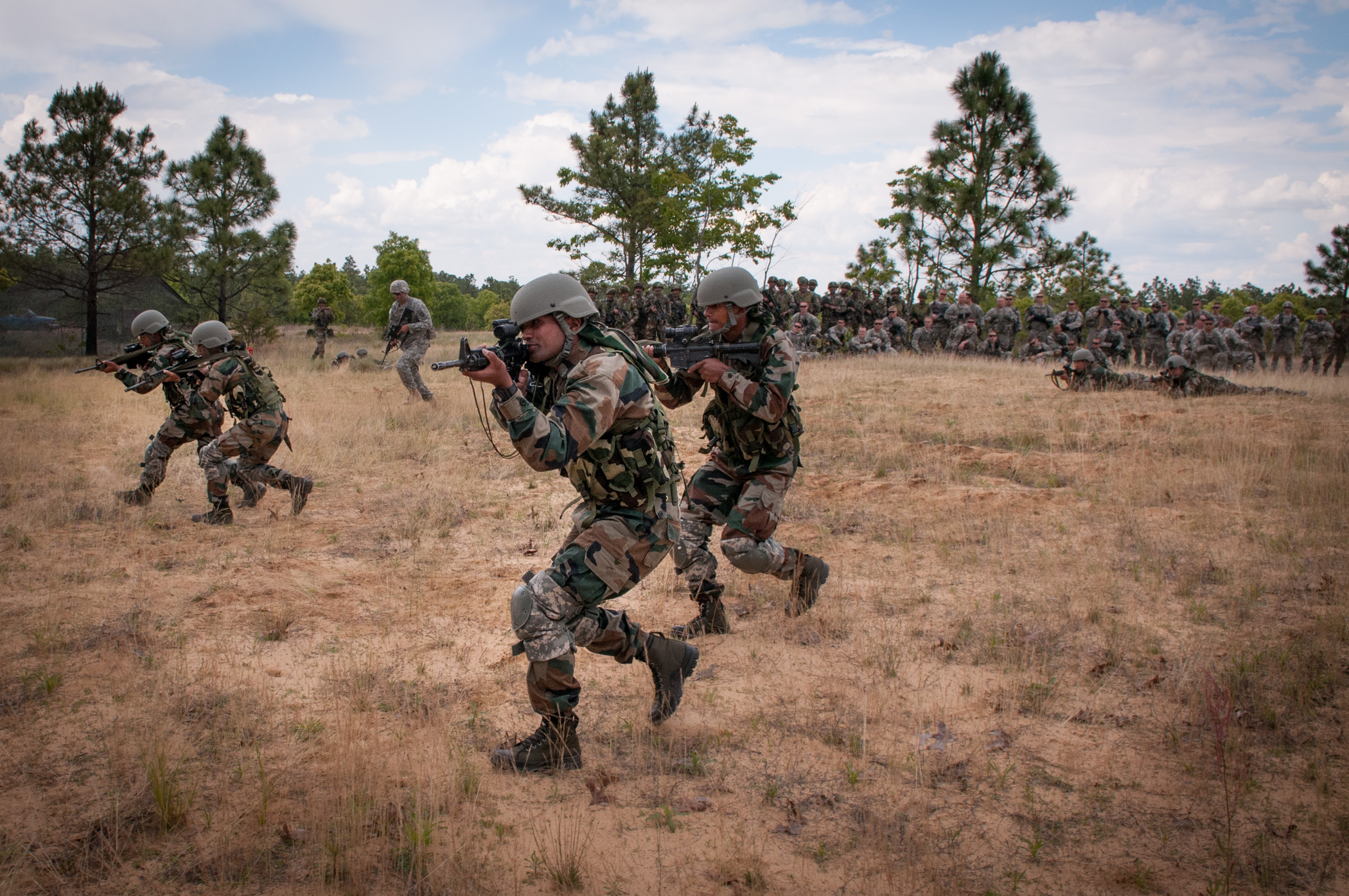
Soldiers of the 99th Mountain Brigade's 2nd Battalion, 5 Gorkha Rifles, during Yudh Abhyas 2013.

Currently, there are 39 battalions serving in 7 Gorkha regiments in the Indian Army. Six regiments were transferred from the British Indian Army, while one was formed after independence;

- 1 Gorkha Rifles – 6 battalions (previously 1st King George V's Own Gurkha Rifles (The Malaun Regiment))
- 3 Gorkha Rifles – 5 battalions (previously 3rd Queen Alexandra's Own Gurkha Rifles)
- 4 Gorkha Rifles – 5 battalions (previously 4th Prince of Wales's Own Gurkha Rifles)
- 5 Gorkha Rifles (Frontier Force) – 6 battalions (previously 5th Royal Gurkha Rifles (Frontier Force))
- 8 Gorkha Rifles – 6 battalions (In 8 GR the First Battalion is converted into Mechanised Infantry Regiment)
- 9 Gorkha Rifles – 5 battalions
- 11 Gorkha Rifles – 6 battalions (raised after the independence of India).

== Regimental centres ==
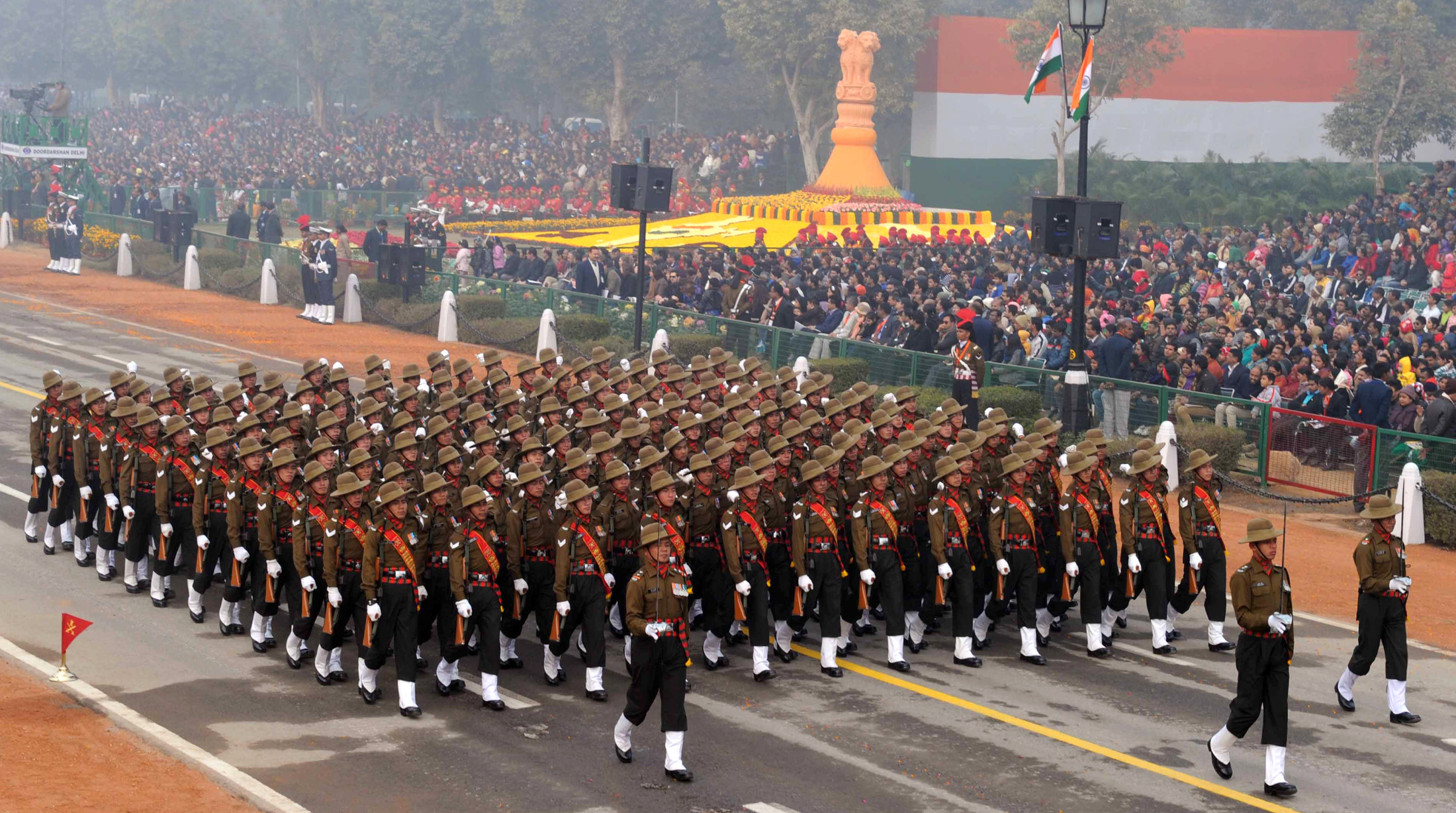
The Gorkha Rifles marching contingents passes through the Rajpath, on the occasion of the 67th Republic Day Parade, 2016.

The Regimental Centres of Gorkha Regiments are situated around the major cities in India. Basically there are 4 Gorkha Training Centres across major cities. They are:

- 11 Gorkha Rifles Regimental Centre (11 GRRC) located in Lucknow, Uttar Pradesh
- 14 Gorkha Training Centre (14 GTC) located in Sabathu, Himachal Pradesh
- 39 Gorkha Training Centre (39 GTC) located in Varanasi, Uttar Pradesh
- 58 Gorkha Training Centre (58 GTC) located in Happy Valley, Shillong, Meghalaya

Apart from this the Gorkhas are mainly recruited from GRD (Gorkha Recruiting Depot) Kunraghat, Gorakhpur, Uttar Pradesh.

=== Affiliations ===
The Gorkha Rifle regiments have the following affiliations:

- 15 Rashtriya Rifles battalion – 1 Gorkha Rifles & 4 Gorkha Rifles
- 32 Rashtriya Rifles battalion – 3 Gorkha Rifles & 9 Gorkha Rifles
- 33 Rashtriya Rifles battalion – 5 Gorkha Rifles & 8 Gorkha Rifles
- 137 Composite Eco-Task Force Battalion (Territorial Army) 3 Gorkha Rifles & 9 Gorkha Rifles – Allahabad, Uttar Pradesh
- 107 Infantry Battalion Territorial Army (11 Gorkha Rifles) – Darjeeling, West Bengal

The individual Gorkha rifle regiments of India are collectively known for regimental purposes as the 'Gorkha Brigade' between themselves and are not to be confused with the Brigade of Gurkhas of the British Army.

== Gorkha headgear ==
Illustration of the Gorkha Hat, commonly used as a banner by Gorkha Regiments.

The Gorkha hat is a wide brimmed slouch hat composed of two layers of material. It is made of felt and is worn tilted. It was originally adopted prior to World War I for wear with the khaki drill service uniform of the time.

The round "pille-box" cap worn with the traditional rifle-green dress uniform of Gorkha regiments was retained after 1947 for off-duty use.

== In popular culture ==
A platoon of the 1/11 Gorkha Rifles, led by Lt. Manoj Kumar Pandey and commanded by Col. Lalit Rai has been depicted in the 2003 Bollywood movie LOC: Kargil. Sudesh Berry portrays Col. Lalit Rai, while Ajay Devgn plays Lt. Manoj Kumar Pandey. Field Marshal S.H.F.J Manekshaw of 8th Gorkha Rifles was also played by Vicky Kaushal in his biopic titled Sam Bahadur released in 2023.

== See also ==
- People of Nepal
- Gurkhas
- Indian Army
- British Indian Army (1858–1947)
- Royal Gurkha Rifles (British Army)
- Brigade of Gurkhas (British Army)
- Gurkha Reserve Unit (Brunei Armed Forces)
- Gurkha Contingent (Singapore Police Force)
- List of operation by Gurkha Army
