= Prakash Mehra =

Indian film producer and director (1939–2009)

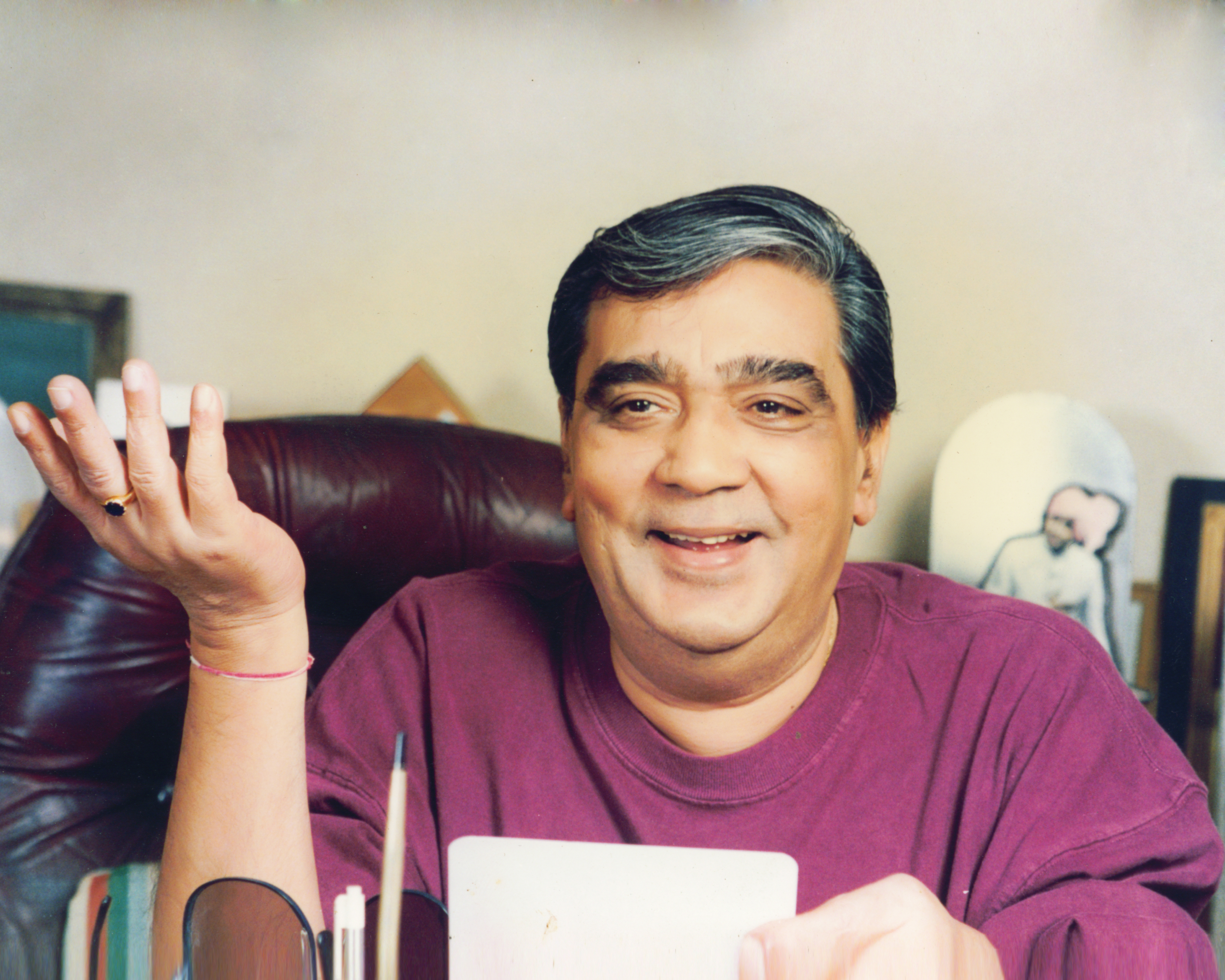
- Mehra in 1993
- Born: 13 July 1939; Bijnor, United Provinces, British India
- Died: 17 May 2009 (aged 69); Mumbai, Maharashtra, India

Prakash Mehra (13 July 1939 – 17 May 2009) was a legendary Indian film director and producer known for his work in Hindi films. He was one of the pioneers of masala films, along with Nasir Hussain, and Manmohan Desai. His collaborations with the actor Amitabh Bachchan resulted in several box office blockbusters and classics.

== Early life and career ==
Born on 13 July 1939 in Bijnor, Uttar Pradesh, Mehra started in the late 1950s as a production controller. In 1968, he directed Shashi Kapoor who played a double role in Haseena Maan Jayegi. In 1973, he produced and directed Zanjeer, with a screenplay by Salim–Javed, and starring Amitabh Bachchan. Zanjeer was the beginning of the Angry Young Man films of Hindi cinema.

This film also started a long and successful collaboration with Bachchan that spanned 7 more films, 6 being blockbuster hits: Hera Pheri, Khoon Pasina, Muqaddar Ka Sikandar, Lawaaris, Namak Halaal and Sharaabi. Their final collaboration was Jaadugar which was a flop and ended their successful streak. Zanjeer was the film credited with launching the career of Bachchan as a lead actor and their final film together Jaadugar.

Prakash Mehra also directed & produced Zindagi Ek Jua with actor Anil Kapoor in 1991, which was not a commercial success. In 1996, he introduced veteran actor Raaj Kumar's son Puru Raaj Kumar in Bal Bramhachari which was also unsuccessful. This was the last film he directed. He also produced the movie Dalaal with Mithun Chakraborty, in the mid-90s, which was a box-office moneymaker. Mehra received a lifetime achievement award from the India Motion Picture Directors Association (IMPDA) in 2006. He also received Lifetime Achievement as Producer from IMPPA (Indian Motion Picture Producers Association) on 19 September 2008.

Prakash Mehra was one of the first Bombay directors to try venture into Hollywood. In the late eighties he tried a joint venture to make the movie The God Connection with Frank Yandolino. The movie was to include Hollywood actors such as Charles Bronson among others, but the project though funded heavily initially, never came to fruition.

Mehra died on 17 May 2009 in Mumbai of pneumonia and multiple organ failure.

== Filmography ==
Year	Film	Director	Producer	Notes
1962	Professor			AS a controller of production
1965	Purnima	Yes		Assistant Director & lyrics one song
1968	Haseena Maan Jayegi	Yes		
1971	Mela	Yes		
1972	Samadhi	Yes		
1972	Aan Baan	Yes		
1973	Zanjeer	Yes	Yes	
1973	Ek Kunwari Ek Kunwara	Yes		
1974	Haath Ki Safai	Yes		
1976	Khalifa	Yes		
1976	Hera Pheri	Yes	Yes	
1977	Khoon Pasina		Yes	
1978	Aakhri Daku	Yes	Yes	
1978	Muqaddar Ka Sikandar	Yes	Yes	
1980	Jwalamukhi	Yes	Yes	
1980	Desh Drohee	Yes	Yes	
1981	Laawaris	Yes	Yes	
1982	Namak Halaal	Yes	Yes	
1984	Sharaabi	Yes	Yes	
1986	Chameli Ki Shaadi			Contributed to script
1987	Muqaddar Ka Faisla	Yes	Yes	
1988	Mohabbat Ke Dushman	Yes	Yes	
1989	Jaadugar	Yes	Yes	
1992	Zindagi Ek Juaa	Yes	Yes	
1993	Dalaal		Yes	
1996	Bal Bramhachari	Yes	Yes	
2001	Mujhe Meri Biwi Se Bachao		Yes	
