= Desh Drohi =

Desh Drohi (lit. 'traitor') may refer to:

- Desh Drohi (1980 film), an Indian Hindi-language action film
- Deshdrohi, a 2008 Indian Hindi-language action thriller film
