= Aakhri Daku =

1978 film by Prakash Mehra

- Poster
- Directed by: Prakash Mehra
- Produced by: Surendra Pal Bhalla
- Starring: Randhir Kapoor; Vinod Khanna; Rekha; Reena Roy
- Music by: Kalyanji-Anandji
- Release date: 7 March 1978
- Country: India
- Language: Hindi

Aakhri Daku (transl. The last dacoit) is a 1978 Hindi movie produced by Surendra Pal Bhalla and directed by Prakash Mehra. The film stars Randhir Kapoor, Vinod Khanna, Rekha, Reena Roy, Sujit Kumar, Ranjeet, Keshto Mukherjee and Paintal. The music to the film is by Kalyanji-Anandji.

== Cast ==
- Randhir Kapoor as Bhola
- Vinod Khanna as Mangal Singh
- Rekha as Barkha
- Reena Roy as Champa
- Padmini Kapila
- Sujit Kumar
- Ranjeet as Ranjeet
- Helen
- Paintal
- Agha
- Keshto Mukherjee
- P. Jairaj
- Mumtaz Begum
- Dulari

== Soundtrack ==
Song	Singer
"Koi Na Koi To Sabhi Mein"	Kishore Kumar
"Maiya Mere Bhaiya Na Aaye Ri"	Lata Mangeshkar
"Yaar Mera Paise Ka Deewana"	Lata Mangeshkar
"Kahin Na Jiya Lage To"	Asha Bhosle
