= Jaadugar (1989 film) =

- Poster
- Directed by: Prakash Mehra
- Written by: Kader Khan; Laxmikant Sharma; Javed Akhtar (Dialogue)
- Screenplay by: Suraj Sanim
- Story by: Suraj Sanim
- Produced by: Prakash Mehra
- Starring: Amitabh Bachchan; Jaya Prada; Aditya Pancholi; Amrita Singh
- Edited by: B. S. Glaad
- Music by: Kalyanji-Anandji
- Distributed by: Eros Entertainment; Prakash Mehra Productions
- Release date: 25 August 1989
- Running time: 166 minutes (theatrical version); 300 minutes (Original Version with two intervals)
- Country: India
- Language: Hindi
- Box office: ₹1.8 crores

Jaadugar (transl. Sorcerer ) is a 1989 Indian Hindi-language fantasy comedy film directed and produced by Prakash Mehra starring Amitabh Bachchan, Jaya Prada, Aditya Pancholi, Amrita Singh, Amrish Puri and Pran in the lead roles. Mehra and Bachchan collaborated for the eighth and final time on this movie.

The movie was poorly received by critics and audiences and was a box office flop. Amrish Puri's charisma as the godman made him a popular choice for negative roles with other directors.

== Plot ==
Returned American NRI Shankar Narayan is baffled to witness his former businessman and jailbird dad posing as a soothsayer by the name of Mahaprabhu Janak Sagar Jagat Narayan, in a small town called Dharampur. He learns that his father has learned a few magician's tricks from a fellow inmate, and is able to fool the entire township with his "divine" powers. Shankar enlists the assistance of noted magician Goga, and brings him to Dharampur. Goga challenges the Mahaprabhu; he is able to dethrone him, ousts him from his temple, and takes over. His task over, Shankar asks Goga to leave; but power-hungry Goga, who now calls himself Gogeshwar, refuses to let go of his new-found position.

Actually Goga is not as power-hungry as he seems to be. Mahaprabhu, however, refuses to give up and uses all deceitful methods to expose the fact that Goga is just a mortal, and it is he who is actually divine. He tries to poison the 'Prasad' that Goga gives to his 'followers' but they all escape. In the end, Goga completely exposes 'Mahaprabhu' in front of the whole public along with the fact that he himself is a common man who posed as a 'Divine' man just to match and teach 'Mahaprabhu'. He then returns to his best role – being the people's magician.

== Cast ==
- Amitabh Bachchan as Goga / Gogeshwar
- Jaya Prada as Meena
- Aditya Pancholi as Shankar Narayan
- Amrita Singh as Mona
- Raza Murad as Rajbharti
- Amrish Puri as Mahaprabhu Jagatsagar Chintamani
- Pran as Gajendra
- Alka Nupur as Amina
- Harbans Darshan M. Arora as Police Inspector (as Harbans Darshan)
- Vikas Anand as Kanchan
- Bharat Bhushan as Gyaneshwar
- Ram Sethi as Pyarelal
- Bob Christo as Bob
- Leena Das as Flory
- C. S. Dubey as Pujari
- K. S. Ramesh as himself (Magician)
- Gorilla as Bajrangi
- Satyendra Kapoor as Police Commissioner
- Johnny Lever as Nilkanth
- Ram Mohan as M.L.A.
- Mukri as Nathulal
- Babbanlal Yadav as Gambler

== Soundtrack ==
Jaadugar

Soundtrack album by Kalyanji Anandji
- Released: 1 December 1989
- Recorded: 1989
- Genre: Feature film soundtrack
- Label: Saregama

The Soundtrack was composed by Kalyanji Anandji. The lyrics were written by Anjaan, Prakash Mehra and Javed Akhtar.

#	Title	Singer(s)	Lyricist(s)
1	"Aaye Hain Duaen Dene"	Kumar Sanu, Jolly Mukherjee, Sadhana Sargam, Sapna Mukherjee	Anjaan
2	"Kya Samjhen Aap Ko"	Sapna Mukherjee	Anjaan
3	"Main Jaadugar"	Kumar Sanu, Jolly Mukherjee	Anjaan with Prakash Mehra
4	"Naach Meri Radha"	Kumar Sanu, Alka Yagnik	Prakash Mehra
5	"Padosan Apni Murgi"	Amitabh Bachchan	Javed Akhtar
