= Bal Bramhachari =

1996 film by Prakash Mehra

- Directed by: Prakash Mehra
- Written by: Prakash Mehra; Anwar Khan; Ravi Kapoor
- Screenplay by: Ravi Kapoor
- Produced by: Prakash Mehra
- Starring: Puru Raaj Kumar; Karisma Kapoor; Deepak Tijori; Aasif Sheikh
- Cinematography: Basheer Ali; N. Satyen
- Edited by: Shyam Gupte
- Music by: Bappi Lahiri
- Distributed by: Prakash Mehra Productions
- Release date: 6 September 1996
- Running time: 163 minutes
- Country: India
- Language: Hindi
- Budget: ₹2 crore
- Box office: ₹4.57 crore

Bal Bramhachari ( English: Forever Ascetic) is a 1996 Indian action Romantic drama film directed by Prakash Mehra. The film marks the film debut of Puru Raaj Kumar, alongside Karisma Kapoor, Deepak Tijori and Simran.

== Plot ==
Thakur Raghuveer Singh and his wife have no children, and there is no hope of getting a child. Thakur Raghuveer Singh donates a huge plot of land to his friend Professor Vijay Thripati to fulfil his friend's dream to build a college. As Raghuveer Singh yearns to have a child and the professor and his wife ask him to adopt their son. Bhujbal Choudary is not happy because Thakur Raghuveer Singh donated his land to his friend Professor Vijay Thripati enraged as he wants to build a factory instead of a college. To churn out the students from the college, he arranges fake diplomas that have no meaning as an anti-social activity. Then he plans to kill the professor and his wife on the day the foundation stone is being laid for the college. The professor is killed; however his wife manages to escape and take shelter in a Hanuman Mandir there, she gives birth to a son in Hanuman temple. On the request of the dying mother, the priest hands over the baby boy to Thakur Raghuveer Singh. Thakur has already decided to adopt Balak Ram's son named Balbir, so later, he adopts both the children. Balak Ram, who has an evil eye on the Raghuveer Singh property and wants to acquire it as well as wants to kill Professor Vijay Thripati's son named Mahavir Singh, also adopted by Thakur.

Mahavir is specially blessed by Bhagwan Bajrangbali and possesses special powers, and he devotes god Hanuman. Thakur's adopted son studies in the same college run by Bhujbal Chowdary. While in college, Balbir meets with Seema and falls in love with her. Seema's friend, Asha Rana, is attracted to Mahavir, but Mahavir has taken a vow of celibacy 'brahmachari', and does not like any woman to come near to him. But Asha tries all of her seductive powers to make Mahavir change his mind. Eventually, Mahavir falls in love with Asha and decides to tie the knot. He also learns of his birth father and his dream. And then takes revenge against their attacker, in a shadowy form that he has magically seen in his dreams.

== Cast ==
- Puru Raaj Kumar as Mahavir Singh/Pawan
- Karishma Kapoor as Asha Rana
- Mukesh Khanna as Thakur Raghuvir Singh
- Asawari Joshi as Bharti, Thakur Raghuvir Singh's wife
- Anang Desai as Professor Vijay Tripathy
- Aparajita as Anju Tripathy
- Deepak Tijori as Balbir Singh/Ballu
- Tinnu Anand as Balak Ram
- Mohan Joshi as Bhujbal Choudhury
- Shakti Kapoor as Bhupati Choudhury
- Aasif Sheikh as Ranjeet, Bhujbal's son
- Simran as Seema Choudhury
- Avtar Gill as Principal Rana
- Ashok Saraf as Pyare Mohan
- Bindu as Professor Monica
- Himani Shivpuri as Shanti
- Kalpana Iyer as Bhupati Choudhury's wife

== Box office ==
Bal Bramhachari was released on 6 September 1996 and grossed Box office collection was estimate 4.57 crore against the budget of 2 crore.

== Music ==
There are 06 songs in the Movie and all the music are composed by Bappi Lahiri and the lyrics are written by Prakash Mehra

#	Title	Singer(s)
1	"Nazrein Lad Gayiyan"	Kavita Krishnamurthy
2	"Kabhi Na Kabhi Jaana"	Alka Yagnik
3	"Ram Dhun Gaao Kripal Dhun Gaao"	Udit Narayan
4	"Zara Chhuke To Dikha"	Asha Bhosle
5	"Tu Hain Ladki Main Hoon Ladka"	Abhijeet Bhattacharya, Sadhana Sargam
6	"Humko Kya Karna"	Vinod Rathod, Bappi Lahiri
