= Lalit Rai =

Indian Army officer, recipient of Vir Chakra

Colonel Lalit Rai VrC
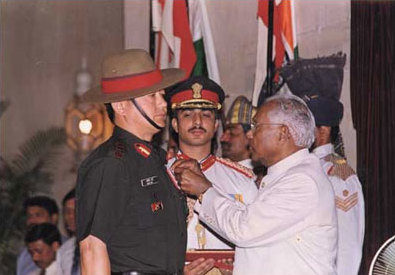
- Col. Lalit Rai being decorated with Vir Chakra by President K R Narayanan
- Born: 24 August 1956; Dehradun, Uttar Pradesh, India (now in Uttarakhand, India)
- Military career
- Allegiance: India
- Branch: Indian Army
- Rank: Colonel
- Commands: 1/11 Gorkha Rifles; 17 Rashtriya Rifles
- Conflicts: Kargil War
- Awards: Vir Chakra; COAS Commendation Card
- Other work: Controller, Human Resources Development at Emcure Pharmaceuticals Ltd; Group President, Human Resources Development and Administration Panchshil Realty

Colonel Lalit Rai, VrC is a former Indian Army officer who was decorated for his brave actions during the Kargil War in 1999. As the commanding officer (CO) of the 1st battalion, 11 Gorkha Rifles, he was tasked with capturing the strategic heights of Khalubar in the Batalik sector during the Kargil War.

== Early life and education ==
Lalit Rai was born in Dehradun, Uttar Pradesh, India (now in Uttarakhand), on 24 August 1956 in a Nepali family. His father, Late Major T B Rai was also from the regiment of 11 GORKHA RIFLES. He did his schooling from Bishop Cotton Boys' School in Bangalore (Class of 1970-71). He did his Pre University Course from Sri Sathya Sai College of Arts and Science and graduated with a Bachelors of Science Degree from Government Arts and Science College, Bangalore University. He has a postgraduate degree in Management from Osmania University, Secunderabad, India and from Naval Postgraduate School, Monterey, California, USA. He represented and captained the Bangalore University Football team and also represented the Karnataka Junior National Team. He was selected for the Senior national Football camp. He represented the Bangalore University Athletics team in the Inter University games.

== Early military career ==
Rai was commissioned into the 7th Battalion the 11 GORKHA RIFLES (7/11 GR). He served in all types of terrain and was selected for many Instructional and Staff appointments. As Adjutant of the prestigious Officers Training Academy, Chennai, he successfully inducted the first batch of Lady officers into the army viz the Women Special Entry Scheme [WSES (O)]. He took over command of 17 RASHTRIYA RIFLES (17 RR) in the thick of Counter Terrorist operations in Doda Dist of Jammu and Kashmir. He was still commanding 17 RR, when he was offered the command of 1/11 GORKHA RIFLES in war zone by Lt Gen J.B.S. Yadava (the then colonel of the regiment). He accepted this offer and was moved to Batalik sector, Kargil district in May 1999, to take over command of 1/11 GORKHA RIFLES (1/11 GR).

== Kargil War ==
The first unit deployed during Operation Vijay was 1/11 GR, who were specialists in high-altitude warfare. Rai took over as the CO after the battalion had been deployed to Batalik sector. One of his platoons was led by Lt. Manoj Pandey (later PVC).

1/11 GR was tasked with the capture of Khalubar, a formidable ridge in the Batalik sector. During the advance, Indian troops were pinned down by effective and heavy volume of enemy fire. Realising the danger of getting day lighted in this vulnerable position, Rai ordered 5 Platoon to clear the interfering enemy positions while he himself led a handful of troops, available in front, to reach the top. The enemy, sensing the danger, counter-attacked these troops from three sides with 30-40 personnel. During this counterattack, Rai was injured in the knee. Despite his injury, he exhorted and encouraged his troops to fight courageously by setting a very high standard of bravery. He refused to be evacuated till such time the objective was captured.

This act boosted the morale of his troops who regrouped and captured the objective in one charge. This capture turned out to be the turning point in the battle of the Batalik sub-sector. This operation accounted for killing of 25 enemy soldiers and capture of large amount of arms and ammunition including a Stinger missile, air defence guns and important documents.

For his inspirational leadership and conspicuous bravery of a very high order, he was awarded the Vir Chakra on 15 August 1999, by the President of India.

== In popular culture ==
In the 2003 war film LOC Kargil, Bollywood actor Sudesh Berry played the role of Col. Lalit Rai.

== Present life ==
Col. Rai is presently the Managing Director of Arcanum Management Consulting LLP & ARION Exports both based at Pune. He is on the Company Board of Directors of a few companies and is Advisor & Consultant to some large size companies in India. He delivered the 3rd Memorial Lecture organised by the General K.S. Thimayya Memorial Trust.

== Military awards and decorations ==

Vir Chakra		Wound Medal	
Special Service Medal	Operation Vijay Star	Operation Vijay Medal	Sainya Seva Medal
High Altitude Service Medal	50th Anniversary of Independence Medal	20 Years Long Service Medal	9 Years Long Service Medal
