= LOC: Kargil =

2003 Indian film by J. P. Dutta

- Theatrical release poster
- Directed by: J. P. Dutta
- Written by: J. P. Dutta
- Produced by: J. P. Dutta
- Starring: Akshaye Khanna; Sanjay Dutt; Ajay Devgn; Saif Ali Khan; Sunil Shetty; Abhishek Bachchan; Mohnish Bahl; Sanjay Kapoor; Manoj Bajpayee; Ashutosh Rana; Karan Nath; Amar Upadhyay; Nagarjuna Akkineni
- Cinematography: Karim Khatri
- Music by: Songs: Anu Malik; Score: Aadesh Shrivastava
- Production company: J. P. Films
- Release date: 26 December 2003
- Running time: 247 minutes
- Country: India
- Language: Hindi
- Budget: ₹30 crore
- Box office: est. ₹32.32 crore

LOC: Kargil is a 2003 Indian Hindi-language epic historical war film based on the Kargil War fought between India and Pakistan, produced and directed by J. P. Dutta under his banner "J. P. Films". The film features an ensemble cast of Bollywood stars and music composed by Aadesh Shrivastava and Anu Malik, with the former composing the score and the latter composing the songs.

The film is based on the Indian Army's successful Operation Vijay that was launched in May 1999 in the wake of the Pakistani intrusion and occupation of the strategic heights in the Kargil sector to flush out the Pakistani intruders from the Indian side of the Line of Control (LoC). Upon release, the film received a mixed response from critics and flopped at the box office. With a running time of 247 minutes, it is one of the longest Indian films ever made and fifth in terms of running time.

== Plot ==
The film opens with an Indian soldier's wireless set chirping commands from a base, calling a patrol to report in while the radio operator lies dead. After attempts to locate lost patrols, Indian Army HQ in Jammu and Kashmir decides to deploy more troops. Lt. Saurabh Kalia and Lt. Amit Bharadhwaj are sent on reconnaissance patrols along the LoC. Kalia's patrol is wiped out; Bharadhwaj's suffers heavy casualties but returns. Pakistani forces shell across the LoC, targeting NH-1A. The Indian Army redeploys more troops but is beaten back by Pakistani intruders occupying peaks around Kargil and other areas. After reverses, maximum mobilization is ordered, deploying the best units, but orders from Delhi restrict crossing the LoC, leaving many battalions unaware of the threat, questioning the justification for such mobilization.

The first unit deployed is the 1st battalion, 11 Gorkha Rifles (1/11 GR), who are specialists in high-altitude warfare. 1/11 GR's commanding officer is Col. Lalit Rai, and the battalion has the charismatic and brave Lt. Manoj Pandey leading one of its platoons. Subsequently, the 18th battalion, The Grenadiers (18 Grenadiers), which was in the Kashmir Valley guarding against terrorist infiltration, was deployed in Kargil. Col. Khushal Thakur leads the battalion, and among the officers and soldiers are men like Lt. Col. R. Vishwanathan, Maj. Rajesh Adhikari, Lt. Balwan Singh, Capt. Sachin Nimbalkar and Grens. Yogendra Singh Yadav. 18 Grenadiers are followed by the 17th battalion, Jat Regiment (17 Jat) led by Col. Umesh Singh Bawa with Capt. Anuj Nayyar is leading one of its units. 17 Jat is followed by the 13th battalion, Jammu & Kashmir Rifles (13 JAK Rif) commanded by Maj. turned Lt. Col. Yogesh Kumar Joshi (Joe) with Lt. Vikram Batra leading one of its units. Other battalions are subsequently inducted into the theatre of conflict. The Indian Air Force launches photographic reconnaissance missions to identify the intruders.

The first assault was carried out by the 1/11 GR advance platoon, led by Lt. Pandey, who first captured Yaldar village and linked up with a beleaguered and severely mauled company from the 3rd battalion, Punjab Regiment (3 Punjab). JCOs from 3 Punjab reveal that earlier patrols from 3 Punjab and 16 Grenadiers had gone missing in the Kukarthang sector. Lt. Pandey's platoon followed the patrol paths and launched an attack on Kukarthang post, a very heavily defended enemy position supported by mortar units and artillery batteries on the Pakistani side of the LoC. The Gorkhas captured Kukarthang after taking 9 casualties. It is later revealed that the size of the infiltration was much larger than previously thought. Indian Army planners believe that approximately 3,000 members of the Pakistan Army's Northern Light Infantry were involved.

The second battle was at the strategic Tololing mountain, which sits astride National Highway 1D, the main supply route for the entire northern Kashmir sector, including Siachen and Leh. 18 Grenadiers linked up with the severely beaten 16 Grenadiers and got the first-hand knowledge of the situation. A company from the 18 Grenadiers, led by Maj. Adhikari attacks Tololing. The company is held up midway due to heavy fog; it waits for clear weather. Intense enemy shelling occurs while the men are resting, causing panic and casualties. They try to move up the mountain but are pushed down by heavy small arms fire from intruders who are well entrenched atop the feature. Subsequent attacks from the Indians are stifled by stiff resistance, and in the absence of artillery support, Maj. Adhikari and Lt. Col. Vishwanathan are killed. 18 Grenadiers make a total of 4 attempts to recapture Tololing but are repeatedly beaten back.

Meanwhile, a unit from 17 Jat led by Maj. Deepak Rampal captures a Pakistani mortar position. They subsequently liberate an important peak, but suffer casualties. Col. Bawa tasks them to capture Pt. 4850.

18 Grenadiers are relieved by the 2nd battalion, Rajputana Rifles (2 Raj Rif), commanded by Col. Ravindranath, which moves in with an artillery battery of 110 mm field artillery and acclimatized troops. They launch a multi-pronged attack with artillery support, which succeeds but at a high cost, with Capt. Vijayant Thapar, Maj. Padmapani Acharya, Maj. Vivek Gupta and Captain Nemo were killed. All this happens while 13 JAK Rif stands by in case 2 Raj Rif fails. Meanwhile, the Indian Air Force launches combat sorties (Operation Safed Sagar) and bombs enemy positions.

13 JAK Rif is blooded at Rocky Knob, where they take the field after suffering heavy casualties. They follow it up with another victory at Point 5140, where Lt. Batra distinguishes himself by taking the south face of the peak without any casualties and is promoted to captain.

The decisive phase of the war arrives. 18 Grenadiers are assigned to take Tiger Hill, 17 Jat to Three Pimple Complex feature, 1/11 GR to Khalubar Ridge, and 13 JAK Rif to Point 4875. After a heavy artillery barrage, 18 Grenadiers take Tiger Hill, spearheaded by a daring stealth attack by the elite Ghatak section, which includes both Grens. Yogendra Singh Yadav. However, only one member of the section, Gren. Yadav (Manoj Bajpayee) survives (despite being shot several times) to link up with the rest of the battalion. 17 Jat suffers heavy casualties with Capt. Nayyar and several others were killed and injured, but they secured the Three Pimple Complex.

1/11 GR link up with 22 Grenadiers at the base of Khalubar Ridge after braving an intense creeping barrage of artillery. Lt. Pandey somehow keeps the sagging morale of the weary unit up till the battalion begins its attack. The plans go awry when Col. Rai is injured by machine gunfire. Lt. Pandey volunteers to take out the bunkers that are holding up the attack. The machine guns are taken out, but Lt. Pandey and his platoon sergeant Hav. Bhim Bahadur is killed.

The last battle is fought by 13 JAK Rif at the Bunker Complex. The unit gets split up – Capt. Batra is sent to link up with Capt. Nagappa has captured one bunker and is surrounded by the enemy. Batra links up with Nagappa but is pinned down by the heavy enemy fire. He single-handedly takes out two bunkers but is mortally wounded. 13 JAK Rif pursues the fleeing enemy to the LOC, but Lt. Col. Joe stops due to orders not to cross it. After that, the 18 Grenadiers, 8 Sikhs, and 1/11 Gorkha Rifles launch their final attack on Tiger Hill, and they manage to capture it. 17 Jat captures Three Pimple Complex. 13 J&K Rifles capture Point 4875. 1/11 GR capture Khalubar Ridge. Finally, India declares Operation Vijay on 14 July 1999 a success.

The film, however, ends on a sombre note as it shows the bodies of soldiers who are killed in action being sent home to their families, while some soldiers who survived happily reunite with their families.

== Cast ==
Artist	Character
Sanjay Dutt	Lt. Col. Yogesh Kumar Joshi (Joe), CO, 13 Jammu and Kashmir Rifles
Ajay Devgn	Captain Manoj Kumar Pandey, 1/11 Gorkha Rifles
Saif Ali Khan	Captain Anuj Nayyar, 17 Jat Regiment
Abhishek Bachchan	Captain Vikram Batra, 13 Jammu and Kashmir Rifles
Suniel Shetty	Rifleman Sanjay Kumar, 13 Jammu and Kashmir Rifles
Akshaye Khanna	Lt. Balwan Singh Panghal, 18 Grenadiers
Mohnish Bahl	Lt. Col. Ramakrishnan Vishwanathan, 2IC, 18 Grenadiers
Manoj Bajpayee	Grenadier Yogendra Singh Yadav, 18 Grenadiers
Akkineni Nagarjuna	Maj. Padmapani Acharya, 2 Rajputana Rifles
Sanjay Kapoor	Maj. Deepak Rampal, 17 Jat Regiment
Karan Nath	Maj. Rajesh Singh Adhikari, 2 Mechanised Infantry (attached to 18 Grenadiers)
Armaan Kohli	Maj. Vikas Vohra, 13 Jammu and Kashmir Rifles
Puru Raaj Kumar	Havildar Bhim Bahadur Dewan, 1/11 Gorkha Rifles
Ashutosh Rana	Grenadier Yogendra Singh Yadav, 18 Grenadiers
Himanshu Malik	Maj. Vivek Gupta, 2 Rajputana Rifles
Sudesh Berry	Col. Lalit Rai, CO, 1/11 Gorkha Rifles
Bikram Saluja	Captain Sanjeev Jamwal (Jimmy), Army Service Corps (attached to 13 Jammu and Kashmir Rifles)
Milind Gunaji	Maj. Dr. Rajesh Adhau, Army Medical Corps (attached to 13 Jammu and Kashmir Rifles as Regimental Medical Officer)
Raj Babbar	Col. Khushal Thakur, CO, 18 Grenadiers
Ashish Vidyarthi	Col. Magod Basappa Ravindranath, CO, 2 Rajputana Rifles
Amar Upadhyay	Captain Vijayant Thapar (Robin), 2 Rajputana Rifles
Ayub Khan	Maj. P.S. Janghu, 17 Jat Regiment
Avtar Gill	Subedar Digendra Kumar, 2 Rajputana Rifles
Mukesh Tiwari	Lt. Col. Amul Asthana, 1/11 Gorkha Rifles
Deepraj Rana	Subedar Raghunath Singh, 13 Jammu and Kashmir Rifles
Amit Behl	Maj. Ajay Singh Jasrotia (Jassi), 13 Jammu and Kashmir Rifles
Rohit Roy	Captain Shashi Bhushan, 315 Field Regiment, Regiment of Artillery (attached to 17 Jat Regiment)
Vineet Sharma	Captain Sachin Annarao Nimbalkar, 18 Grenadiers
Manek Bedi	Maj. Ritesh Sharma, 17 Jat Regiment
Kiran Kumar	Col. Umesh Singh Bawa, CO, 17 Jat Regiment
Devashish	Captain Joy Dasgupta, 18 Grenadiers
Sharad Kapoor	Maj. S. Vijay Bhaskar, 13 Jammu and Kashmir Rifles
Nagender Choudhary	Captain Naveen Nagappa, 13 Jammu and Kashmir Rifles
Deepak Jethi	Maj. Mohit Saxena, 2 Rajputana Rifles
Rajendranath Zutshi	Captain Neikezhakuo Kengurüse (Nemo), 2 Rajputana Rifles
Shahzad Khan	Naib Subedar Zakir Hussain, 22 Grenadiers
Akbar Khan	Maj. Ajeet Singh
Raveena Tandon	Deepak Rampal's wife
Namrata Shirodkar	Joe's wife
Rani Mukerji	Hema (Manoj Pandey's love interest)
Mahima Chaudhry	Reena Yadav (Yogendra Singh Yadav (Manoj Bajpayee)'s wife)
Kareena Kapoor	Simran (Anuj Nayyar's fiancée)
Esha Deol	Dimple Cheema (Vikram Batra's fiancée)
Preeti Jhangiani	Balwan's fiancée
Isha Koppikar	Santo (Sanjay Kumar's fiancée)
Divya Dutta	Yogendra Singh Yadav (Ashutosh Rana)'s wife
Priya Gill	Charulata Acharya (Padmapani Acharya's wife)
Akanksha Malhotra	Kiran Adhikari (Rajesh's wife)
Maya Alagh	Manoj Pandey's mother
Yashodhan Bal	Lt. General
Ashutosh Jha	Intruder
Surendra Singh	Intruder
Hemant Choudhary	

== Production ==
Just like J. P. Dutta's previous war film Border, the Indian military provided technical and material assistance during the production and filming of LOC Kargil. Weapons depicted were those used in the Kargil war, like different variants of the INSAS rifle family as well as Swedish Bofors Haubits FH77 artillery guns and BM-21 Grad multiple rocket launchers. Indian Air Force planes like SEPECAT Jaguars in bombing roles and helicopters like Mil Mi-17s and HAL Cheetahs were shown in casualty evacuation roles. Pakistani artillery depicted were Indian field guns and 81 mm mortars. SLRs stood in for the G3 rifles used by the Pakistan Army.

Shah Rukh Khan was first offered Sanjay Dutt's role, but things couldn't be worked out. Aamir Khan was the initial choice for Karan Nath's role. Rahul Khanna and Arbaaz Khan were signed for the film, but both walked out later. Jackie Shroff was signed for the film but dropped out later. Salman Khan was the original choice for Abhishek Bachchan's role. Mukesh Khanna was signed for the film but was later replaced by Raj Babbar. Danny Denzongpa was signed for the film but later opted-out; Sudesh Berry replaced him later.

== Soundtrack ==
LOC:Kargil

Soundtrack album by Anu Malik

Anu Malik chronology
Saaya (2003)	LOC:Kargil (2003)	Munna Bhai M.B.B.S. (2003)

The music of this movie was composed by Anu Malik, with lyrics written by Javed Akhtar. According to the Indian trade website Box Office India, with around 15,00,000 units sold, this film's soundtrack album was the year's eighth highest-selling.

List of songs

No.	Title	Singer(s)	Length
1.	"Pyar Bhare Geet"	Sonu Nigam, Shreya Ghoshal	9:23
2.	"Main Kahin Bhi Rahoon"	Udit Narayan, Sonu Nigam, Roop Kumar Rathod, Hariharan, Sukhwinder Singh	12:52
3.	"Ek Saathi Aur Bhi Tha"	Sonu Nigam	8:32
4.	"Seemaaye Bulaaye"	Alka Yagnik, Chorus	7:59
5.	"Khush Rehena"	Roop Kumar Rathod, Hari Om Sharan & Sudesh Bhosle	6:35
6.	"Before We Forget"	Instrumental	5:46
Total length:			51:07

== Reception ==
Anupama Chopra of India Today called LOC: Kargil "Wasted effort" and wrote, "Stretching to more than four hours, the film feels almost as long as the actual conflict." Anita Bora for Rediff.com wrote, "The battle scenes are gruesome, loud and hammer at you, much like the blazing guns in the background. But a lot has gone into making the scenes as realistic as possible. ... The one negative factor is its length. This might deter many from watching the movie. Possibly a slightly edited version, keeping it within 3 hours is called for". Kavitha K of Deccan Herald wrote, "The movie has crisp dialogues (O.P. Dutta), good cinematography (Karim Khatri), well executed war sequences (Bhiku Verma), but fails to keep the viewer riveted for four long hours because of the surfeit of cameos, canons and caterwauling damsels."

== Awards ==
49th Filmfare Awards:

Nominated

- Best Director – J. P. Dutta
- Best Supporting Actor – Manoj Bajpayee
- Best Music Director – Anu Malik
- Best Lyricist – Javed Akhtar for "Ek Saathi Aur Bhi Tha"
