= Rajesh Singh Adhikari =

Recipient of Maha Vir Chakra

Major Rajesh Singh Adhikari MVC
- Born: 25 December 1970; Nainital, Uttar Pradesh (now Uttarakhand), India
- Died: 30 May 1999 (aged 28); Tololing, Kargil, Jammu and Kashmir, India
- Military career
- Allegiance: Republic of India
- Branch: Indian Army
- Service years: 1993-1999
- Rank: Major
- Service number: IC-52574
- Unit: 18 Grenadiers
- Conflicts: Kargil War †
- Awards: Maha Vir Chakra

Major Rajesh Singh Adhikari, MVC (25 December 1970 – 30 May 1999), was an Indian Army officer who died during the Kargil War. He was posthumously awarded the second highest Indian military honour, the Maha Vir Chakra for bravery on the battlefield.

== Early life ==
Major Adhikari was born in Almora was raised in Nainital. He completed his schooling from St. Joseph's College in 1987, Intermediate from Government Inter College, Nainital and B.Sc. from Kumaon University in 1992.

== Military career ==
He attended the Indian Military Academy, a premier military academy in India. Major Rajesh Singh was commissioned on 11 December 1993 from the Indian Military Academy. After graduating from the Academy, he joined the 2 Mech. Infantry of the Indian Army. He was posted in 18 Grenadiers at the time of Kargil War.

== Death ==
When heavy fighting broke out in the Kargil region of the Indian state of Jammu and Kashmir, the Indian Army was ordered to clear the heights. Many battles took place in the region. The Mechanized Infantry's Major Rajesh Singh Adhikari, the second army officer to die in the operations, had caused heavy casualties to the Pakistani forces and forced them to withdraw before succumbing to injuries in Drass sector. It was one of the most significant battles, the Battle of Tololing, where Rajesh died.

== Maha Vir Chakra Citation ==
The citation for the Maha Vir Chakra reads as follows:

Gazette Notification: 17 Pres/2000,15.8.99

Operation: Vijay - Kargil

Date of Award: 1999

Citation:

On 30 May 1999, as a part of battalion operation to capture the Tololing feature, Major Rajesh Singh Adhikari was tasked to secure the initial foothold by capturing its forward spur where the enemy held a strong position. The enemy position was located in a treacherous mountainous terrain covered with snow at a height of about 15,000 feet. While Major Adhikari was leading his company towards the objective, he was fired at from two mutually supporting enemy positions with Universal machine guns. The officer immediately directed the rocket launcher detachment to engage the enemy position and killed two enemy soldiers in close quarter combat. Thereafter, the officer, displaying presence of mind under heavy fire, ordered his medium machine gun detachment to take position behind a rocky feature and engage the enemy. The assault party continued to inch their way up. While so advancing forward, Major Adhikari suffered grievous bullet injuries, yet he continued to direct his sub-unit. Refusing to be evacuated, then he charged at the second enemy position and killed one more occupant, thus capturing the second position at Tololing which later facilitated capture of Point 4590. However later he succumbed to his injuries.

Major Rajesh Singh Adhikari displayed exceptional valour, outstanding leadership in the presence of the enemy and laid down his life in the highest traditions of the Indian Army.

== In popular culture ==
In the 2003 war film LOC Kargil, Bollywood actor Karan Nath played the role of Maj. Rajesh Adhikari.
