= Jaago (2004 film) =

2004 Indian film directed by Mehul Kumar

- Directed by: Mehul Kumar
- Written by: K.K. Singh
- Produced by: Mehul Kumar
- Starring: Manoj Bajpayee; Sanjay Kapoor; Raveena Tandon; Hansika Motwani
- Cinematography: Mahendra Rayan
- Edited by: Yusuf Sheikh
- Music by: Sameer Sen
- Distributed by: Mehul Movies (as M. K. Pictures)
- Release date: 6 February 2004
- Country: India
- Language: Hindi

Jaago (transl. Wake Up) is a 2004 Indian Hindi-language crime thriller film directed by Mehul Kumar. It stars Sanjay Kapoor, Raveena Tandon, Manoj Bajpayee and Hansika Motwani. The film is based on a true incident from August 2002, in which a mentally challenged 10-year-old girl was raped on her local commuting train. The plot deals with the rape and death of a ten-year-old schoolgirl and the dramatic quest for justice by a lone but determined police inspector. The film was a box-office failure.

== Plot ==
After a long day in school, ten-year-old Shruti Verma is accidentally locked inside the school house, and by the time she is found and released, it is already night time. She boards a commuter train home, with an elderly couple and their daughter being her only company in the compartment. Then a trio of three young men, drug-hazed and violent, enter the wagon, notice the young girl and brutally gang-rape her. The other passengers are too timid to intervene; only after the culprits have left the train do they call the police. Shruti is taken to a hospital, but she eventually dies from a massive shock in front of her anguished parents, Shrikant and Shradha Verma.

Kripa Shankar Thakur, an honest and upright inspector of the Indian police, is entrusted with the case by the Police Commissioner. He finds out that the culprits turn out to be the sons of wealthy and influential citizens. After tracking down the identities of the witnesses, Shankar sets a trap to catch the offenders in the act: Dressed provocatively, Shradha acts as bait by boarding the same train her daughter had taken. Indeed, the three culprits reappear and attempt to rape her as well. In her rage over her daughter's suffering at the hands of these men, Shradha retrieves a knife from her handbag and viciously stabs one of her attackers to death; consequently, she is arrested and detained for manslaughter.

More determined than ever, Inspector Shankar continues his pursuit for justice, even with the weight of corruption rising to obstruct him; he meets threats with counter-threats and attempts at bribery with the arrest of the perpetrators, and even gains popular support from influential people in law enforcement. But this is not enough for Shrikant: with his desperation having become unbearable, he bursts into the courthouse where the offenders are on preliminary trial, and shoots one of them. Just when the cause seems lost for the surviving rapist, his lawyer Satyaprakash Satwani resorts to vicious methods: he manages to buy off Shankar's friend Sawant, who is to kill the witnesses before they can testify in court. But Shankar proves too resilient; he kidnaps Sawant's wife and son, forcing the latter to release the witnesses. With the family's testimony and the moving pleas of Shrikant and Shradha for more justice, and Shankar's own accusation of the corruption in India's political system, the presiding judge acquits the Vermas and sentences the last of the culprits to death by hanging, with Shrikant and Shradha acting as his executioners.

Following the execution, the film ends with the judge walking towards a sunset beach, saying by voiceover: "After delivering the verdict, I handed in my resignation. I don't know how those who know the law will react to my decision. What I do know, however, is that I have done justice to my soul. I have truly awakened," and then turning to the audience with the reminder: "It's time you awakened too."

== Cast ==
- Sanjay Kapoor as Shrikant Verma
- Raveena Tandon as Mrs. Shradha Verma
- Manoj Bajpayee as Inspector Kripa Shankar Thakur
- Puru Raaj Kumar as Elias Ansari, a gangster
- Hansika Motwani as Shruti Verma
- Rupal Patel as Mother of one of the offenders (cameo appearance)
- Chirag Vohra as Mayank Choudhary
- Akhilendra Mishra as TP Choudhary
