= Desh Drohi (1980 film) =

1980 Hindi film

- Directed by: Prakash Mehra
- Written by: Satish Bhatnagar
- Screenplay by: Satish Bhatnagar
- Story by: Mohan Kaul
- Produced by: Bhagwant Singh; G. L. Khanna
- Starring: Navin Nischol; Saira Banu
- Cinematography: N. Satyan
- Edited by: V. N. Mayekar
- Music by: Kalyanji-Anandji
- Release date: 1 February 1980
- Country: India
- Language: Hindi

Desh Drohi (transl. Traitor) is a 1980 Indian Hindi-language action film produced by Bhagwant Singh and G. L. Khanna. The film is directed by Prakash Mehra. The film stars Navin Nischol and Saira Banu. The film's music was composed by Kalyanji-Anandji.

== Cast ==
- Saira Banu
- Navin Nischol
- Asrani
- Ranjeet
- Padma Khanna
- Dev Kumar
- Pran
- Keshto Mukherjee
- Madan Puri
- Yunus Parvez
- Rakesh Pandey
- P. Jairaj
- R.P. Sethi
- Ram Mohan
- Sunil Dhawan

== Crew ==
- Director - Prakash Mehra
- Producer - Bhagwant Singh and G. L. Khanna
- Story - Mohan Kaul
- Writer - Satish Bhatnagar
- Dialogue - Satish Bhatnagar
- Editor - V. N. Mayekar
- Cinematographer - N. Satyan
- Audiography – K. S. Rane
- Action – Veeru Devgan
- Banner – Sangam Art International, Bombay
- Assistant Music Director – Babla, Frank

== Songs ==
All songs are lyrics by Gulshan Bawra.

Song	Singer
"Marne Se Nahin Darte Hai"	Kishore Kumar
"Holi Khelat Nandalal"	Kishore Kumar, Mahendra Kapoor, Asha Bhosle
"Sun Habib Mere"	Lata Mangeshkar
"Idhar Gaya Ya Udhar Gaya"	Asha Bhosle
