= J.B.S. Yadava =

Retired Indian army general

Lieutenant General Jay Bhagwan Singh Yadav PVSM, AVSM, VrC, VSM
- Born: Achina Village, Mahendragarh, then Punjab now Haryana, India
- Military career
- Allegiance: India
- Branch: Indian Army
- Service years: 1964-2005
- Rank: Lieutenant General
- Service number: IC-16095
- Unit: 11 Gorkha Rifles
- Commands: Deputy Chief of the Army Staff (India); XVI Corps; Rashtriya Rifles
- Conflicts: Indo-Pakistan War of 1965; Indo-Pakistan War of 1971; Operation Rakshak Punjab
- Awards: Param Vishisht Seva Medal; Ati Vishisht Seva Medal; Vir Chakra; Vishisht Seva Medal

Lieutenant General Jay Bhagwan Singh Yadav, PVSM, AVSM, VrC, VSM is a retired General of the Indian Army.

== Life ==
Yadava was commissioned into the 11th Gorkha Rifles of the Indian Army in 1964. He participated in the wars of 1965 and 1971. He was awarded the Vir Chakra for his bravery for his significant contribution in the Bangladesh Liberation War. From 1992 to 1994, he commanded the Rashtriya Rifles against militancy in the state. He has also been the Deputy Chief of the Army Staff (India) from September 2002 to February 2005.

Military offices
Preceded by R. S. Kadyan	Deputy Chief of Army Staff (Training and Coordination)	Succeeded by Mohinder Puri (as Deputy Chief of the Army Staff (Information Systems and Training)
