= Puru Raaj Kumar =

Indian actor (born 1970)

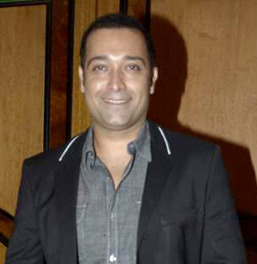
- Kumar in 2009
- Born: Puru Raaj Kumar Pandit; 30 March 1970 (age 56); Bombay, Maharashtra, India (present-day Mumbai)
- Education: Gettysburg College
- Occupation: Actor
- Years active: 1996–2014
- Spouse: Koraljika Grdak (m. 2011)
- Parent: Raaj Kumar (father)

Puru Raaj Kumar (born 30 March 1970) is an Indian actor who works in Hindi films. He is the son of actor Raaj Kumar and is married to Croatian model Koraljika Grdak.

== Early life and education ==
Puru Raaj Kumar was born in Bombay, Maharashtra, India to a Kashmiri Pandit father, Raaj Kumar and Gayatri (original name Jennifer), an Anglo-Indian. Raaj Kumar was an actor, and Jennifer an air hostess. Puru was a student of Gettysburg College where he majored in economics, psychology and theatre.

== Career ==
Kumar's first film Bal Bramhachari was released in 1996, where his co-star was Karisma Kapoor. In 2000, he did Hamara Dil Aapke Paas Hai where he played a negative role, and Mission Kashmir. In the following years his releases included Khatron Ke Khiladi (2001), Dushmani (2002), LOC Kargil (2003).

After several flops at the box office, Kumar was not able to establish a strong footing in Bollywood. He acted in Jaago in 2004. After more than two years, his film Umrao Jaan (2006) was released. His latest film was Action Jackson (2014) where he played the role of ACP Shirke.

== Filmography ==
Year	Film	Role	Notes
1996	Bal Bramhachari	Mahavir / Pawan	Debut film
2000	Hamara Dil Aapke Paas Hai	Babloo	
2000	Mission Kashmir	Malik Ul Khan	
2001	Khatron Ke Khiladi	Ranjha Hindustani	
2001	Uljhan	Varun	
2001	Arjun Devaa	Devaa	
2002	Bharat Bhagya Vidhata	National Security Guard Major Abdul Hamid	
2002	Vadh	Aryan	
2002	Inth Ka Jawab Patthar	Devendra	
2002	Dushmani		
2003	LOC Kargil	Bhim Bahadur Dewan	
2004	Jaago	Elias Ansari	
2006	Umrao Jaan	Gauhar Mirza	
2007	Dosh	Vishant V. Chopra / Vishant V. Mehta	
2010	Veer	Kunwar Gajendra Singh	
2014	Action Jackson	ACP Shirke	

== Personal life ==
Kumar married Croatian model, Koraljika Grdak on 14 October 2011 in Zagreb.

== Legal Troubles ==
On 17 December 1993, Kumar ran his car over eight people who were sleeping on a pavement in Bandra, Mumbai. Three people died in this accident. It is also said that he was drunk at that time and was arrested for this incident. Later, he was released. It is said that the matter was settled out of court and he had to pay fine for this mishap.
