= Manoj Kumar Pandey =

Indian Army officer and recipient of Param Vir Chakra

Captain Manoj Kumar Pandey PVC
- Born: 25 June 1975; Sitapur, Uttar Pradesh, India
- Died: 3 July 1999 (aged 24); Bunker Ridge, Khalubar, Batalik Sector, Kargil, Ladakh, India
- Military career
- Allegiance: India
- Branch: Indian Army
- Service years: 1997–1999
- Rank: Captain
- Service number: IC-56959W
- Unit: 11th Gorkha Rifles
- Conflicts: Kargil War; Battle of Kukarthan; Battle of Khalubar
- Awards: Param Vir Chakra

Signature
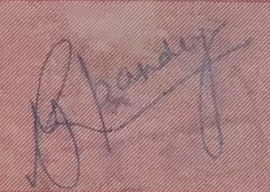

Captain Manoj Kumar Pandey, PVC (25 June 1975 – 3 July 1999) was an Indian army officer, and a posthumous recipient of India's highest military decoration, the Param Vir Chakra, for his audacious courage and leadership during the Kargil War in 1999. An officer of the first battalion in the 11th Gorkha Rifles (1/11 GR), he martyred in battle on the bunker hill edge of the Khalubar Hills in the village of Garkon Aryan Valley in Kargil.

== Early life ==
Manoj was born on 25 June 1975 in Rudha village, in the Sitapur district of Uttar Pradesh in a Kanyakubja Brahmin family. He was born to Gopi Chand Pandey, a small-town businessman living in Lucknow, and Mohini. He was the eldest child, and was educated at Uttar Pradesh Sainik School, Lucknow and Rani Laxmi Bai Memorial Senior Secondary School. He had a keen interest in sports with boxing and body building in particular. He was adjudged the best cadet of junior division NCC of Uttar Pradesh directorate in 1990.

Prior to his selection, during his Services Selection Board (SSB) interview, the interviewer asked him, "Why do you want to join the Army?" He replied, "I want to win the Param Vir Chakra." Captain Manoj Kumar Pandey did win the country's highest gallantry honour but posthumously.

== Military career ==
Entry in Pandey's personal diary

"Some goals are so worthy, it's glorious even to fail!"

—

He graduated from the National Defence Academy in 90th course and belonged to Mike Squadron (Mustangs). Pandey was commissioned as a lieutenant in the 1st battalion, 11th Gorkha Rifles on 7 June 1997.

=== Kargil War ===
In early May, the intrusion in the Kargil sector was reported. The 1/11 Gorkha Rifles battalion had finished a one-and-a-half year tenure in the Siachen Glacier and was on-the-move to its peace-time location in Pune. The battalion was asked to move to the Batalik sector in Kargil. It was among the first units to be inducted into this sector. The unit, commanded by Colonel Lalit Rai, was assigned responsibility of the Jubar, Kukarthaam and Khalubar areas and their battalion headquarters was in Yeldor.

Pandey, as part of the battalion, was involved in a series of attacks, including those which led to the capture of Jubar Top. Manoj Pandey martyred securing the Dras Valley.

=== Param Vir Chakra Action ===
Entry in Pandey's personal diary

"If death strikes before I prove my blood, I swear, I will kill death!"

In early July, 'B' Company of 1/11 GR was assigned the task to capture Khalubar top. Pandey was commanding a Platoon in this company. Quickly sizing up the situation, he killed two enemy personnel and destroyed the second position by killing two more.

Although wounded in the shoulder and leg, he pressed on his solitary charge with serious determination, until he closed in on the first bunker. The two armies engaged in a ferocious, hand-to-hand combat. The troops charged at the enemy and fell upon them. Undaunted and without caring for his grievous injuries, he continued to lead the assault on the fourth position urging his men and destroyed the same with a grenade, even as he got a fatal burst on his forehead. He collapsed at the final bunker and succumbed to his injuries.

=== Citation ===
The Param Vir Chakra citation reads as follows:

CITATION

LIEUTENANT MANOJ KUMAR PANDEY

1/11 GORKHA RIFLES

Lieutenant Manoj Kumar Pandey, a young officer of the 1/11 Gorkha Rifles, took part in a series of boldly led attacks during Operation Vijay, forcing back the intruders with heavy losses in Batalik, including the capture of Jubar Top.

His finest hour was during the advance to Khalubar, when he was Number 5 Platoon Commander. On the night of 2/3 July 1999, as the platoon approached its final objective, it came under heavy and intense enemy fire from the surrounding heights. The officer was tasked to clear the interfering enemy positions, so as to prevent his battalion from getting daylighted, being in a vulnerable position. The officer quickly moved his platoon to an advantageous position under intense enemy fire and sent one section to clear the enemy positions from the right, while he himself proceeded to clear four other enemy positions on the left. Fearlessly assaulting the first enemy position, he killed two enemy personnel and proceeded to assault the second and destroyed it by killing two more enemy personnel. Lieutenant Manoj Kumar Pandey was injured on the shoulder and legs by enemy fire while clearing the third position. Undaunted and without caring for his grievous injury, he led the assault on the fourth position urging his men and destroyed the same with a grenade, even as he got a fatal Medium Machine Gun burst on his forehead. It is this singular daredevil act of the officer, which provided the critical firm base for the companies, which finally led to capture of Khalubar.

Lieutenant Manoj Kumar Pandey, thus showed most conspicuous bravery, indomitable courage, exemplary personal valour, outstanding leadership and devotion to duty of an exceptionally high order, in the face of the enemy and made the supreme sacrifice in the highest traditions of the Army.

=== Gallantry award ceremony ===
On the occasion of Independence Day 1999, a month after the war ended, the President of India approved the award of the Param Vir Chakra to Captain Manoj Kumar Pandey and three others - Captain Vikram Batra, Rifleman Sanjay Kumar and Grenadier Yogendra Singh Yadav. His father, Gopichand Pandey, received the award from the President of India K. R. Narayanan during the Republic Day Parade in New Delhi on 26 January 2000.

== Honours and legacy ==
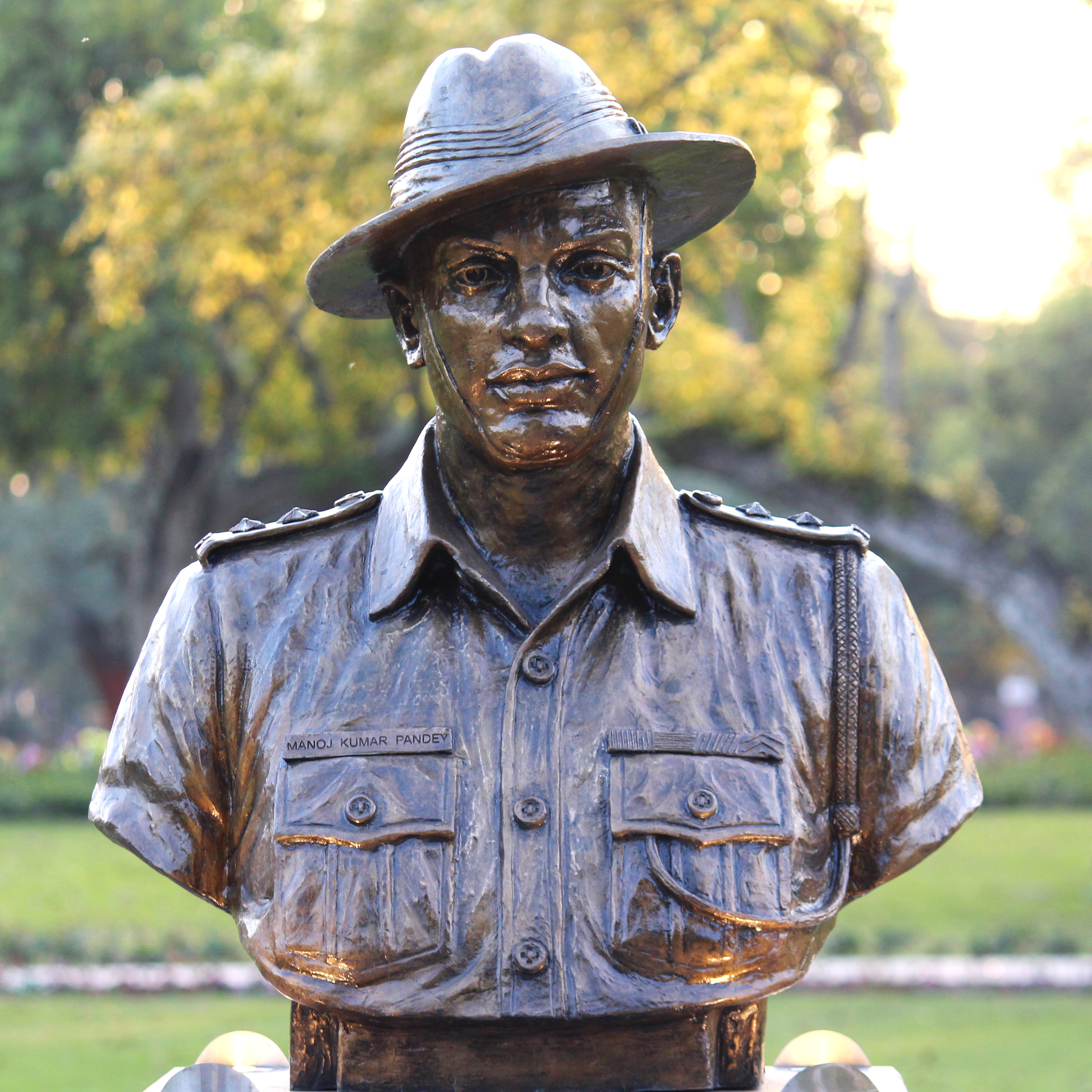
Pandey's statue at Param Yodha Sthal, National War Memorial, New Delhi

Pandey is one of the 21 individuals who have been decorated with India's highest military honour. As a PVC awardee, his statue is at the Param Yodha Sthal at the National War Memorial.

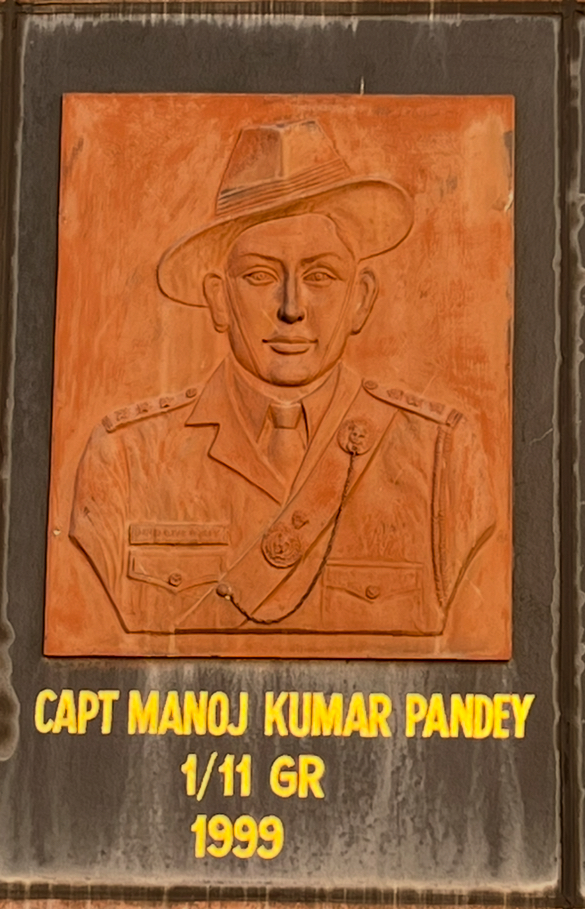
Relief Mural in Balidan Stambh

Balidan Stambh, the war memorial in Jammu in 2009 paid tribute to him by inscribing his name on the pillars erected in semi circumference for the martyrs of the 1947-48 war. His name is displayed near the eternal flame and as relief mural on the semi circumference wall with the Param Vir Chakra awardees who attained martyrdom in Jammu and Kashmir.

After his death, multiple places have been named after him including his almae matres.

Rani Laxmi Bai Memorial Senior Secondary School

- They constructed an auditorium in his name, which was inaugurated by his parents.

UP Sainik School

- Pandey's alma mater, the Uttar Pradesh Sainik School, Lucknow was renamed after its most illustrious alumnus. It is now called CAPTAIN MANOJ KUMAR PANDEY U.P. SAINIK SCHOOL, LUCKNOW.
- An auditorium in the school was named after him. Its foundation stone was laid by General VK Singh in 2011.
- The school conducts an inter-school football tournament annually - 'Late Capt. Manoj Kr. Pandey PVC Football Tournament Trophy'.
- The main gate was named after him.

National Defence Academy

- The National Defence Academy named the science block as the "Manoj Pandey Block".
- His portrait hangs at the Mike squadron of the academy.

Services Selection Board, Allahabad

- A hall is made in the name of Capt. Manoj at Services Selection Board Allahabad named as Manoj Pandey Block.

Capt. Manoj Pandey Memorial Sports Stadium, at Garkon

- The Captain Manoj Pandey Stadium is a sports arena located at village Garkon, Aryan Valley Batalik Sector in the Kargil district of India. The stadium is dedicated to the memory of Captain Manoj Kumar Pandey, an Indian Army officer who was posthumously awarded the Param Vir Chakra, the highest military honour in India, for his bravery during the Kargil War in 1999.

Roads and buildings

- The Army Welfare Housing Organisation (AWHO) designed and constructed an apartment complex for veterans in Ghaziabad district, Uttar Pradesh, and named it for Pandey as "Manoj Vihar".
- The army quarters near the Cardio Thoracic Center (CTC) hospital in Pune is named after Martyr Capt Manoj Pandey as "Capt. Manoj Pandey Enclave"
- A roundabout is also named after Martyr Capt.Manoj Pandey as "Captain Manoj Pandey Chowk" in his home district Sitapur, Uttar Pradesh and center of Gomti Nagar, Lucknow, Uttar Pradesh, India.
- A gallery in the Kargil War Museum at Dras is named after him.
- Gen MM Naravane dedicated a memorial to Capt Manoj Pandey, at his native village Rura on 19 March 2021
- Officers Training Academy Cadets mess is named as Capt Manoj Pandey mess

== In popular culture ==
- A graphic novel titled Param Vir Chakra by Amar Chitra Katha dedicated their eighteenths story written by Prabha Nair and drawn by Harsh Mohan Chattoraj in 2015
- A graphic novel titled Param Vir Chakra Manoj Kumar Pandey by Roli Books written by Ian Cardozo and drawn by Rishi Kumar in 2019
- He was portrayed by Ajay Devgn in the film LOC: Kargil.
