= 11th Gorkha Rifles =

Regiment of the Indian Army

- 11th Gorkha Rifles Regiment insignia
- Active: 1918–1922, 1948–present
- Country: British India (1918-1922); India (1948-present)
- Branch: British Indian Army (formerly); Indian Army
- Type: Rifles
- Role: Light Infantry
- Size: 6 Battalions
- Regimental Centre: Lucknow, Uttar Pradesh
- Nickname: Kiranti Veer (Kirantis The Bravest of the Brave)
- Motto: Yatraham Vijayastatra (We are the Metaphor for Victory)
- March: Regimental Song: Kiranti Veer Kirant Ko
- Decorations: 1 Param Vir Chakra; 1 Military Crosses; 3 Ashoka Chakras; 1 Padma Bhushan; 7 Param Vishist Seva Medals; 2 Maha Vir Chakras; 9 Ati Vishist Seva Medals; 11 Vir Chakras; 5 Shaurya Chakras; 35 Sena Medals; 14 Vishisht Seva Medals; 18 Mentioned-in-Despatches
- Battle honours: Shingo River, Bogra and Batalik; Theater Honours: East Pakistan 1971 and J&K 1971
- Website: assn11gr.org

Commanders
- Ceremonial chief: Colonel of the Regiment
- Colonel of the Regiment: Major General Ajeet Singh Gahlot, SM
- Notable commanders: Gen Bipin Rawat; Gen Anil Chauhan; Lt Gen J.B.S. Yadava; Lt Gen Lakshman Singh Rawat

Insignia
- Regimental Insignia: A pair of crossed khukuris with the Roman numeral XI in between
- War cry: Jai Maa kali, Ayo Gorkhali (Hail goddess Mahakali, The Gorkhas Are Here)

The 11th Gorkha Rifles is a Gorkha regiment of the Indian Army that was re-raised after independence. The regiment consists of primarily the Kirant Tribes Rai and Limbu and small numbers of Sunuwars, Tamangs and Yakkhas of Eastern Nepal, Darjeeling, Kalimpong, Dooars of West Bengal, Sikkim and other parts of Northeast India. Though it is considered to be the youngest of the Gorkha regiments its lineage is as long as those of the 7th Gurkha Rifles and 10th Gurkha Rifles.

The regiment has participated in all major military operations India has undertaken since independence including in the Indo-Pakistani War of 1947, Operation Polo in 1948, the Indo-Pakistani War of 1965, the Indo-Pakistani War of 1971, and the Kargil War in 1999. Units of the regiment have also deployed abroad on UN missions.

== History ==
=== First raising ===
The 11th Gurkha Rifles was raised as an ad hoc unit in 1918 with troops and officers being drawn from the various Gurkha regiments. The regiment, consisting of four battalions, saw service in both Palestine and Mesopotamia at the end of the First World War, as well as during the Third Afghan War in 1919, before being disbanded in 1922 and the troops being reverted to their original units. There were no separate insignias authorized for this regiment and the personnel wore the badges of distinction of their parent units, though there have been instances where unofficial badges were made and worn by some personnel.

=== Second raising ===
Following Indian independence in 1947, the Gurkha regiments of the British Indian Army were divided between the new Indian Army and the British Army. A referendum was held among the soldiers of the four regiments (2nd, 6th, 7th and 10th Gurkhas) that would transfer to the British as to whether they wished to join the British Army, as the decision to do so was made entirely voluntary. Of the four regiments, one battalion (4th battalion, 2nd Gurkhas) opted en masse to join the Indian Army and became part of the 8 Gorkha Rifles as their 5th battalion. In the event, large numbers of men from the 7th and 10th Gurkhas, which recruited predominantly from eastern Nepal, opted to join the Indian Army as against the British Army to whom their regiments were allotted. So, in order to retain a contingent from this area of Nepal, the Indian Army made the decision to re-raise the 11 Gorkha Rifles.

11 Gorkha Rifles was officially re-raised on 1 January 1948 as the first army regiment to be raised post-independence, with regimental centres at Palampur and Mumbai. The regimental centre was subsequently shifted to Jalapahar in Darjeeling, and then moved to Clement Town, Dehradun for a brief period, and finally to Lucknow where it was firmly established. The regiment was raised predominantly with the manpower from the non-optees of the 7th and 10th Gurkha Rifles. As the regiment was raised by the Indian Army after independence, it was decided not to retain the honours and traditions of the first 11th Gurkha Rifles of the British Indian Army.

Today, the regiment has a total of six regular and one Territorial Army battalions.

=== Indo-Pakistani War of 1971 ===
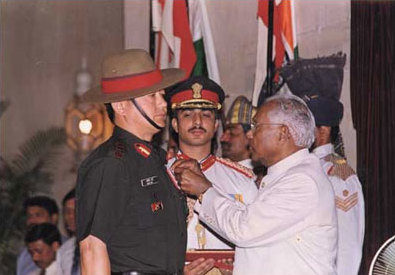
Colonel Lalit Rai receiving the Vir Chakra from President K. R. Narayanan for his command of 1/11 GR during the Kargil War.

From the jungles of Nagaland, the Bnz moved to New Misamari in Jan 1971 under the orbatz of 301 Mtn Bde/ 23rd Infantry Division. The Bn stayed at Misamari only for a short duration of three months before moving to Durgapur and Burdwan districts of West Bengal for IS duties for conduct of state elections. The Bn was back to Misamari in Aug 1971. However, by then the clouds of war and turmoil had already begun to take shape in Bangladesh. By Sep 1971, ‘The First’ moved by train to Dharmanagar from Tezpur and took up defences in Sonamura heights near Comilla, the then East Pakistan (Now Bangladesh). Aggressive patrolling and ambushes were carried out by the Bn to deter the enemy. On 08 Nov 1971, Capt PK Rampal was wounded in a gunfight while silencing one MMG post with grenade while carrying out a raid. L/Nk Gurudas was awarded Sena Medal for his daring act of evacuating Capt Rampal from the spot. On the night of 03/ 04 Dec, when the Kirantis were spearheading their way to Buschi, the Battalion created history by capturing 06 Officers including the CO, 8 JCOs and 202 OR of 25 Baloch Frontier Force near Hilalnagar. Subsequently, on 05 Dec, the Battalion led by C Coy under Maj NS Shekhawat cleared Mudafarganj town in a lightning day light attack and secured two important bridges. The Kirantis showed utmost bravery and dedication when on 07 Dec 1971, Pak Army launched two Counter Attacks to siege the bridge and they were beaten back not once but twice. Maj BKD Badgel continued to fight and organise the defences even after being shot through his arm. For this dare devil act and unflinching leadership, Maj BKD Badgel was awarded Vir Chakra. On 09 Dec 1971, the Bn joined the brigade at Chandpur. On morning of 11 Dec 1971, the Pakistanis again tasted the metal of Khukri when an enemy gunboat carrying soldiers and a White Flag fired treacherously on the Bn when they were effecting a surrender. Bn on 14 Dec 1971, reached the other end of Daudkandi wherein they were heli-lifted to Kuripara. The Meghna heli bridge was the first ever joint Air Force and Army operation since Independence and it greatly expedited the termination of hostilities. The aim of the operation was to facilitate rapid movement of Indian troops over Meghna, as the existing bridges were destroyed by Pak forces to delay move of 4 Corps. The Bn took up a daring task of establishing a bridge head across Meghna river in area Godnail so as to facilitate their infiltration up to Jalkhundi. Capt RV Ram yet again lead A Company on assault craft and in no time established a foot hold on the other bank. The Battalion was part of the deadliest thrust of 23 Infantry Division and 4 Corps operations and fulfilled all tasks allotted in ample manner. During the entire operations the first inflicted heavy casualty on the enemy including 33 killed and one wounded. The Battalion earned One Vir Chakra, two Sena Medals, two Mentioned in Dispatches & one Vishisth Seva Medal for excellent operational performance. After the liberation of Bangladesh, the Bn returned to Misamari in Mar 1972 and stayed uptill 16 Aug 72 before finally moving to Dalhousie.

=== Kargil War ===
During the Kargil War in 1999, the 1st battalion (1/11 GR) saw extensive action. Commanded by Colonel Lalit Rai, it was tasked with the capture of several strategic peaks in the Kargil region. The crowning moment of paltan's history came during the 1999 Indo Pak Kargil conflict. After a successful Siachen tenure, the Bn was concentrated at Nurla for de-induction. The advance party had already reached Pune and the ECC clothing issued to the unit had been deposited. Bulk of the weapons had been handed over to the relieving unit. It was in these circumstances that on 8 May 99, the battalion became the first unit to be inducted in the Kargil war. It was only on 02 Jun 99 that Col Lalit Rai, took over the reins of the paltan. Not to be disheartened by adversities, the ‘KIRANTIS’ in a trail of glory wiped out the enemy conquering Khalubar, Kukarthang, Point 5289, Point 5190, Point 5300 and Tekri in their stride thus proving once again that they are the best fighters in the world. During the attack on 'Area Bunker', Captain Manoj Kumar Pandey, in spite of being injured in shoulder and leg, single-handedly destroyed one enemy bunker after another until he finally received a fatal UMG burst on his forehead. Inspired by his spontaneous valour, the KIRANTIS struck like lightning upon the enemy until not a single one was left standing. For this act of exceptional bravery, Captain Manoj Kumar Pandey was posthumously awarded the highest gallantry award the ‘PARAM VIR CHAKRA’. Apart from Captain Manoj Kumar Pandey, 13 other braves made the supreme sacrifice and immortalized themselves in the annals of history. Col Lalit Rai, Hav Bhim Bahadur Dewan and Lance Naik Gyanendra Rai were awarded the Vir Chakra. In recognition of its good work, the battalion was awarded the Chief of the Army Staff Unit Citation, 2nd time within the decade. The battalion was bestowed with Battle Honour, 'BATALIK' and theatre honour, 'KARGIL'. Also, 'The First' entered the exclusive club of those rarest of the rare units of the Indian Army to have won both the ‘Param Vir Chakra’ and the ‘Ashok Chakra’ thus earning the coveted title of being 'The Bravest of the Brave'. Captain Manoj Kumar Pandey was a young officer in 1/11 GR, who was posthumously awarded the Param Vir Chakra (PVC), India's highest gallantry award, for his actions in Batalik sector.

== Units ==
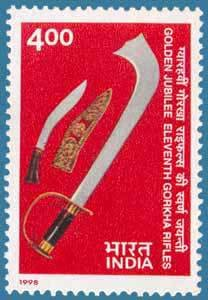
1998 postal stamp to mark the Golden Jubilee of the 11th Gorkha Rifles

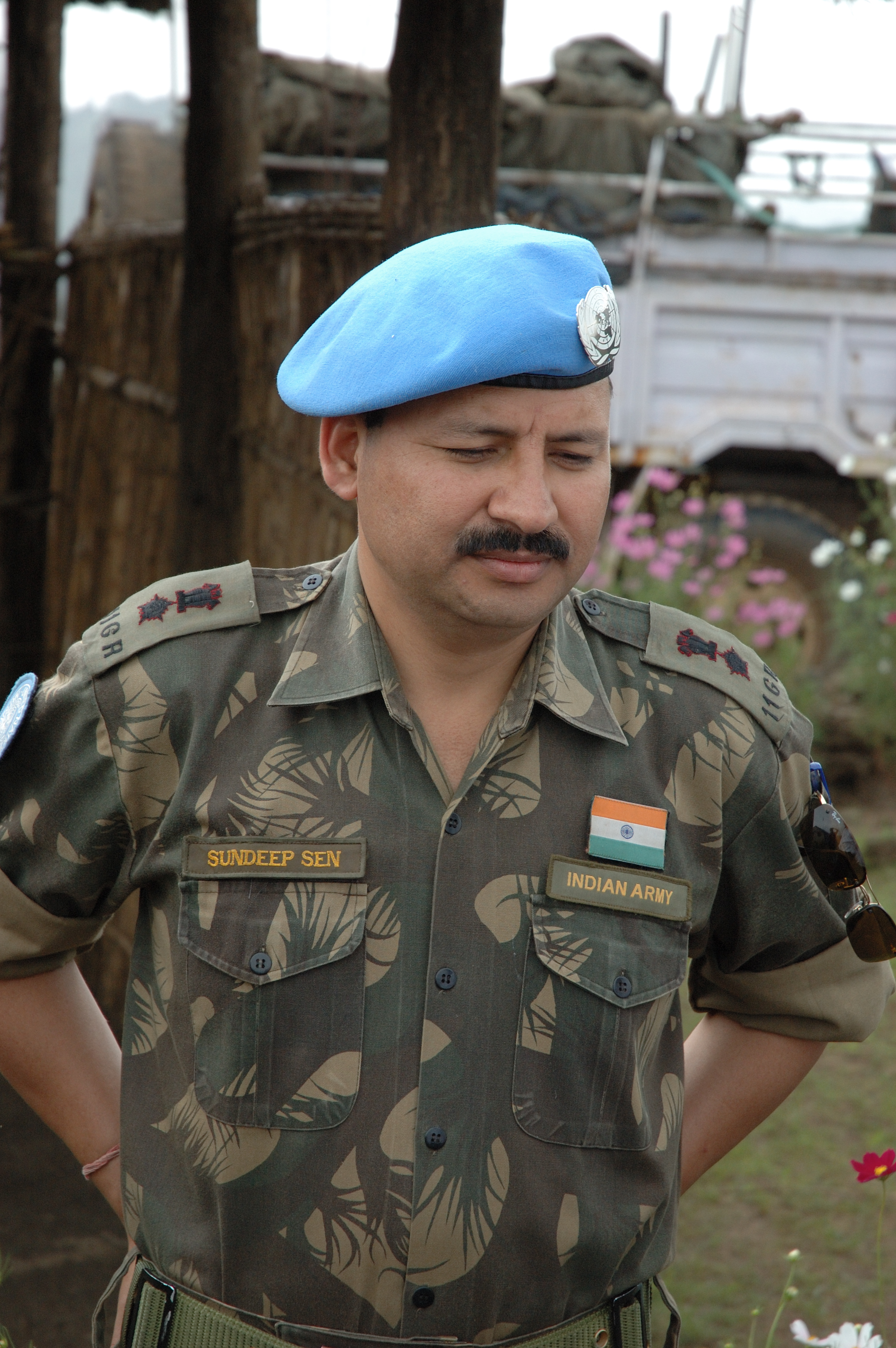
Lt Colonel Sundeep Sen, commanding the 11th Gorkha Rifles contingent of the MONUSCO in the Democratic Republic of the Congo.

- 1st Battalion (Batalik)(Bravest of the Brave)
- 2nd Battalion (Shingo)
- 3rd Battalion
- 5th Battalion (Bogra)
- 6th Battalion
- 7th Battalion
- 107th Infantry Battalion (Territorial Army) (11th Gorkha Rifles) (based at Darjeeling, West Bengal)

Others:

- 4th Battalion was disbanded

In addition, the Sikkim Scouts regiment, which was formed in 2013, is affiliated with the regiment.

== Battle and theatre honours ==
The battle honours of the regiment are Bogra, East Pakistan 1971, Shingo River Valley, Jammu and Kashmir 1971 and Batalik, Op Vijay J&K 1999. Theater honours are East Pakistan 1971 Jammu and Kashmir and Kargil for Operation Vijay 1999.

== Gallantry awards ==
The list of gallantry awards received by the regiment is as follows:

Victoria Cross

- Rfn. Ganju Lama

Param Vir Chakra

- Capt. Manoj Pandey (posthumous)

Ashok Chakra

- Capt. Man Bahadur Rai
- Rfn. Sal Bahadur Limbu
- Second Lt Puneet Nath Dutt (posthumous)

Mahavir Chakra

- Brigadier (later Lt Gen) Ram Dharam Dass Hira

Vir Chakra

- Lt Colonel (later Lt Gen) Francis Tiburtius Dias
- Major (later Lt Gen) Jai Bhagwan Singh Yadav
- Major (later Brigadier) Abjeet Singh Mamik
- Colonel Lalit Rai
