= List of cities and towns in Punjab, Pakistan by population =

The following list sorts all the cities in the Pakistani province of Punjab with a population of more than 100,000 according to the 2023 Census. As of 1 March 2023, 81 cities fulfill this criterion and are listed here. This list refers only to the population of individual cities, municipalities and towns within their defined limits, which does not include other municipalities or suburban areas within Urban agglomerations.

== List ==
The following table lists the 81 cities in Punjab with a population of at least 100,000 on 1 March 2023, according to the 2023 Census of Pakistan. A city is displayed in bold if it is a state or federal capital.

City	2023 census	2017 census	1998 census	
**Lahore**	13,004,135 ▲	11,119,985 ▲	5,209,088	Lahore
Faisalabad	3,691,999 ▲	3,210,158 ▲	2,008,861	Faisalabad
Rawalpindi	3,357,612 ▲	2,097,824 ▲	1,409,768	Rawalpindi
Gujranwala	2,511,118 ▲	2,028,421 ▲	1,132,509	Gujranwala
Multan	2,215,381 ▲	1,871,843 ▲	1,197,384	Multan
Sargodha	975,886 ▲	658,208 ▲	458,440	Sargodha
Sialkot	911,817 ▲	656,730 ▲	421,502	Sialkot
Bahawalpur	903,795 ▲	762,111 ▲	408,395	Bahawalpur
Jhang	606,533 ▲	414,131 ▲	293,366	
Sheikhupura	591,424 ▲	473,129 ▲	280,263	Sheikhupura
Gujrat	574,240 ▲	390,533 ▲	251,792	Gujrat
Sahiwal	538,344 ▲	389,605 ▲	208,778	
Okara	533,693 ▲	357,935 ▲	201,815	
Rahim Yar Khan	519,261 ▲	420,419 ▲	233,537	Rahim Yar Khan
Kasur	510,875 ▲	358,409 ▲	245,321	
Dera Ghazi Khan	494,464 ▲	399,064 ▲	190,542	
Wah Cantonment	400,733 ▲	380,103 ▲	198,891	
Burewala	361,664 ▲	232,030 ▲	152,097	
Hafizabad	318,621 ▲	245,784 ▲	133,678	
Chiniot	318,165 ▲	278,528 ▲	172,522	
Jhelum	312,426 ▲	190,471 ▲	147,392	
Kamoke	292,023 ▲	248,814 ▲	152,288	
Khanewal	281,890 ▲	249,916 ▲	133,986	
Sadiqabad	274,210 ▲	238,313 ▲	144,391	
Muridke	254,291 ▲	167,082 ▲	111,951	
Khanpur	247,170 ▲	184,793 ▲	120,382	
Bahawalnagar	241,873 ▲	160,883 ▲	111,313	
Muzaffargarh	235,541 ▲	209,604 ▲	123,404	
Mandi Bahauddin	232,361 ▲	198,643 ▲	99,496	
Daska	228,626 ▲	175,416 ▲	102,883	
Pakpattan	221,280 ▲	176,686 ▲	109,033	
Chakwal	218,356 ▲	138,214 ▲	80,508	
Gojra	214,349 ▲	174,831 ▲	117,892	
Vehari	210,288 ▲	145,647 ▲	94,343	
Ahmedpur East	196,618 ▲	133,426 ▲	96,415	
Chishtian	192,403 ▲	149,939 ▲	102,287	
Samundri	186,371 ▲	156,991 ▲	54,908	
Ferozewala	177,238 ▲	141,405 ▲	55,433	
Attock	176,544 ▲	146,396 ▲	69,729	
Jaranwala	170,872 ▲	150,380 ▲	106,985	
Hasilpur	168,146 ▲	115,613 ▲	71,295	
Kamalia	166,617 ▲	135,641 ▲	97,324	
Kot Abdul Malik	162,030 ▲	143,434 ▲	63,525	
Arif Wala	157,063 ▲	112,306 ▲	74,174	
Gujranwala Cantonment	156,929 ▲	137,302 ▲	93,093	
Jampur	155,243 ▲	87,857 ▲	52,516	
Jatoi	155,196 ▲	109,538 ▲	38,986	
Wazirabad	152,624 ▲	128,060 ▲	90,197	
Layyah	151,274 ▲	126,361 ▲	72,319	
Shujabad	151,115 ▲	80,098 ▲	57,409	
Haroonabad	149,679 ▲	107,858 ▲	62,878	
Jalalpur Jattan	146,743 ▲	96,210 ▲	69,395	
Lodhran	144,512 ▲	117,851 ▲	65,501	
Kot Addu	142,161 ▲	129,703 ▲	80,720	
Mian Channu	140,112 ▲	90,157 ▲	64,859	
Khushab	139,905 ▲	119,426 ▲	87,859	
Rajanpur	137,553 ▲	99,097 ▲	43,643	
Taxila	136,900 ▲	122,013 ▲	71,882	
Bhakkar	131,658 ▲	112,807 ▲	68,896	
Narowal	130,692 ▲	103,067 ▲	57,052	
Mianwali	129,500 ▲	118,883 ▲	80,171	
Shakargarh	126,742 ▲	81,643 ▲	50,747	
Mailsi	125,431 ▲	82,322 ▲	55,434	
Dipalpur	122,759 ▲	99,753 ▲	57,224	
Haveli Lakha	122,389 ▲	78,257 ▲	52,207	
Lalamusa	121,036 ▲	91,566 ▲	59,996	
Sambrial	119,571 ▲	109,438 ▲	49,574	
Bhalwal	117,982 ▲	99,762 ▲	61,523	
Taunsa	115,704 ▲	97,193 ▲	38,297	
Phool Nagar	114,530 ▲	92,842 ▲	56,113	
Pattoki	113,735 ▲	87,757 ▲	58,961	
Jauharabad	113,188 ▲	91,357 ▲	40,175	
Chichawatni	112,191 ▲	94,733 ▲	72,721	
Farooqabad	109,717 ▲	77,591 ▲	59,015	
Sangla Hill	103,709 ▲	61,498 ▲	50,368	
Gujar Khan	103,284 ▲	90,149 ▲	57,099	
Kharian	103,036 ▲	87,569 ▲	73,627	
Pasrur	102,717 ▲	82,457 ▲	45,747	
Kot Radha Kishan	102,057 ▲	58,894 ▲	39,555	
Ludhewala Waraich	100,331 ▲	92,020 ▲	33,928	
Renala Khurd	100,054 ▲	54,160 ▲	32,337	

== List of cities with population from 50,000 to 100,000 ==
Mini Cities or Large Towns by population in Punjab, Pakistan
No.	City	Pop. (2023)	Pop. (2017)
82	Uch Sharif	98,852 ▲	42,684
83	Fazilpur	98,627 ▲	76,809
84	Kahror Pacca	98,325 ▲	82,137
85	Dijkot	96,934 ▲	39,873
86	Khurrianwala	96,743 ▲	75,907
87	Hujra Shah Muqeem	95,921 ▲	76,629
88	Nankana	94,988 ▲	79,458
89	Dinga	94,252 ▲	50,793
90	Kabirwala	91,932 ▲	74,904
91	Kunjah	90,905 ▲	32,588
92	Jalalpur Pirwala	89,679 ▲	67,453
93	Shahkot	89,638 ▲	73,491
94	Chunian	87,547 ▲	72,589
95	Chowk Azam	87,376 ▲	67,421
96	Dina	84,629 ▲	56,949
97	Fort Abbas	83,192 ▲	61,528
98	Chenab Nagar	81,695 ▲	64,204
99	Mustafaabad	81,550 ▲	60,578
100	Fateh Jang	81,321 ▲	66,500
101	Ghakhar	80,320 ▲	65,517
102	Alahabad	80,097 ▲	61,935
103	Talagang	79,431 ▲	64,083
104	Zahirpir	76,979 ▲	48,493
105	Ali Pur Chatta	76,964 ▲	60,983
106	Taxila	75,444 ▲	67,246
107	Kahuta	75,349 ▲	60,610
108	Qila Didar Singh	74,523 ▲	66,491
109	Mithankot	74,479 ▲	36,755
110	Alipur	74,095 ▲	44,504
111	Sarai Alamgir	73,967 ▲	54,864
112	Bhera	70,921 ▲	40,320
113	Hasan Abdal	69,529 ▲	63,218
114	Darya Khan	68,622 ▲	60,856
115	Minchinabad	67,164 ▲	56,563
116	Narang Mandi	67,137 ▲	45,770
117	Liaquatpur	66,933 ▲	51,888
118	Pindi Bhattian	66,511 ▲	55,356
119	Raja Jang	66,404 ▲	30,855
120	Pindi Gheb	63,810 ▲	45,195
121	Chowk Sarwar Shaheed	63,421 ▲	56,117
122	Kot Momin	63,411 ▲	50,818
123	Phalia	62,453 ▲	52,789
124	Shehr Sultan	62,184 ▲	49,844
124	Kallar Syedan	60,941 ▲	54,239
125	Yazman	60,738 ▲	48,883
126	Chak Jhumra	60,131 ▲	48,796
127	Kot Chutta	59,870 ▲	51,666
128	Nowshera Virkan	59,639 ▲	49,377
129	Sahiwal, Sargodha	57,374 ▲	48,286
130	Chaubara	57,002 ▲	48,371
131	Jand	56,254 ▲	48,194
132	Safdarabad	54,242 ▲	27,739
133	Zafarwal	52,639 ▲	39,319
134	Lalian	52,542 ▲	45,411
135	Fateh Pur	52,255 ▲	44,084
136	Dunyapur	51,888 ▲	41,554
137	Mananwala	51,746 ▲	45,740
138	Malakwal	51,327 ▲	43,423
139	Sukheke	50,458 ▲	42,609
140	Jahanian	50,318 ▲	43,646

== List of towns with population from 15,000 to 50,000 ==
List of Towns by population in Punjab, Pakistan
No.	Town	Pop. (2023)	Pop. (2017)
1	Tandlianwala	49,680 ▲	47,452
2	Sillanwali	49,311 ▲	37,719
3	Kundian	48,658 ▲	45,647
4	Khadian	48,519 ▲	38,850
5	Sharak Pur	48,019 ▲	41,885
6	Pir Mahal	47,376 ▲	44,220
7	Khairpur Tamewali	47,284 ▲	41,492
8	Shorkot	47,248 ▲	43,019
9	Hadali	45,302 ▼	53,669
10	Kharian	44,513 ▲	39,423
11	Jalalpur Bhattian	44,421 ▲	40,897
12	Hazro	44,242 ▲	39,556
13	Garh Maharaja	42,401 ▲	36,407
14	Choa Saidan Shah	41,074 ▲	22,574
15	Sinawan	40,593 ▲	35,209
16	Mamu Kanjan	40,249 ▲	37,043
17	Bhawana	39,270 ▲	34,087
18	Donga Bonga	39,150 ▲	32,957
19	Kamar Mushani	39,013 ▲	36,064
20	Kanganpur	38,568 ▲	28,184
21	Karor Lal Esan	38,375 ▲	35,243
22	Ahmadpur Sial	37,801 ▲	31,227
23	Sohawa	37,488 ▲	26,185
24	Khewra	36,552 ▲	34,463
25	Trinda Sawai Khan	36,223 ▲	31,698
26	Kot Samaba	35,908 ▲	31,945
27	Liaqatabad	35,297 ▲	31,307
28	Warburton	35,053 ▲	30,677
29	Khanqah Dogran	34,949 ▲	26,317
30	Kallur Kot	34,319 ▲	29,368
31	Daud Khel	33,141 ▲	28,546
32	Mitha Tawana	32,870 ▼	33,562
33	Khangarh	32,161 ▲	30,476
34	Athara Hazari	30,137 ▲	27,554
35	Pind Dadan Khan	28,197 ▼	29,935
36	Shahpur Saddar	28,183 ▲	20,444
37	Kallar Kahar	27,928 ▲	24,283
38	Kalabagh	27,916 ▲	22,937
39	Isa Khel	27,612 ▲	25,560
40	Daultala	27,237 ▲	21,895
41	Dullewala	25,276 ▲	19,565
42	Quaidabad	24,520 ▲	21,413
43	Kotli Sattian	23,543 ▲	22,401
44	Bhaun	21,711 ▲	18,859
45	Jandanwala	21,280 ▼	22,913
46	Lawa	20,619 ▲	15,595
47	Noorpur Thal	20,100 ▲	19,780
48	Ghorghushti	18,730 ▲	15,752
49	Nowshera	18,577 ▲	13,753
50	Mankera	18,234 ▲	14,145
51	Dhaunkal	16,396 ▲	13,302
52	Murree	16,317 ▼	148,304
53	Rojhan	15,871 ▲	14,545

== See also ==
- List of cities in Pakistan by population
  - List of cities in Azad Kashmir by population
  - List of cities in Balochistan, Pakistan by population
  - List of cities in Gilgit-Baltistan by population
  - List of cities in Khyber Pakhtunkhwa by population
  - List of cities in Sindh by population
