= Shakargarh =

City in Punjab, Pakistan

Shakargarh شکرگڑھ
- City
- Location within Punjab, Pakistan Location within Pakistan
- Coordinates: 32°15′46″N 75°9′30″E
- Country: Pakistan
- Province: (Punjab, Pakistan) Punjab
- District: Narowal
- Tehsil: Shakargarh
- Established: 1912
- Incorporated: 1912

Government
  - Type: Municipal Committee
  - Chief Officer: Pervaiz Akhtar
  - Assistant Commissioner: Aamir Ijaz Akbar

Population (2023 census)
  - City: 126,742
  - Rank: 95th in Pakistan (2023)
- Time zone: UTC+5 (PST)
- Postal code span: 51800
- Area code: 0542
- Website: www.shakargarh.net

Shakargarh (Punjabi, Urdu: شکرگڑھ), the capital of Shakargarh Tehsil, is a city in the north-east of Narowal District in Punjab, Pakistan. It borders Kathua District to the east and Zafarwal Tehsil to the west. Its literacy rate is more than 85% which is the highest literacy rate tehsil-wise. The city is located at 32°16'0N 75°10'0E on the west bank of the Ravi River. The Tehsil is administratively subdivided into 35 union councils, three of which form the Tehsil capital Shakargarh.

== Demographics ==
Population

Historical population
Year	Pop.	±% p.a.
1961	9,104	—
1972	20,201	+7.51%
1981	25,484	+2.61%
1998	50,747	+4.13%
2017	81,643	+2.53%
2023	126,742	+7.61%

The total area of Shakargarh Tehsil is about 1,272 square kilometres. According to the 1998 census, Narowal District's population was 1,256,097 of which only 12.11% were urban.

Languages

Languages of Shakargarh MC (2023 Census)
1. Punjabi (92.6%)
2. Urdu (6.50%)
3. Others (0.90%)

== Colleges/Schools ==
- Government Graduate College Shakargarh
- Government Muslim Model High School Shakargarh
- Government High School Shakargarh
- Ghazali School & College Shakargarh

== See also ==
- List of metropolitan areas in Pakistan
- List of districts in Pakistan
- List of cities in Pakistan by population
  - List of cities in Azad Kashmir by population
  - List of cities in Balochistan, Pakistan by population
  - List of cities in Gilgit-Baltistan by population
  - List of cities in Khyber Pakhtunkhwa by population
  - List of cities in Sindh by population
  - List of cities in Punjab, Pakistan by population
