= Geography of Lahore =

The Ravi River flows on the north-western side of Lahore.

The geography of Lahore comprises the various features relating to the land and climate of Lahore, Pakistan. Lying between 31°15′—31°45′ N and 74°01′—74°39′ E, Lahore is bounded on the north and west by the Sheikhupura District, on the east by Wagah, and on the south by Kasur District. The Ravi River flows on the northern side of Lahore. Lahore city covers a total land area of 1014 km^{2} and is still growing.

== Geography ==
=== Urban ===
Lahore is the capital of Pakistan's largest province, Punjab; with a population exceeding 10 million, it is a megacity and ranked as the country's second largest metropolis (after Karachi). Collectively, it is also the fifth largest city in South Asia and the 26th largest city in the world in terms of population. As a major urban centre of Pakistan, it was graded in 2008 as a city with high sufficiency to become a Gamma world city.

=== Rural ===
Lahore, Punjab has a subtropical steppe/ low-latitude semi-arid hot climate (Köppen-Geiger classification: BSh). Lahore is located on a subtropical thorn woodland and Deserts and xeric shrublands biome.

== Transport ==
Lahore enjoys air, rail & road connections with rest of the country. The Allama Iqbal International Airport caters the needs of Lahore and its adjacent cities, as regular national & international flights are made from here. Lahore is a major railway junction serving links to major cities. On the south of Lahore National Highway N-5 links Multan, on North West & North runs Motorway M-1 and National Highway N-5 towards Gujranwala. On the west it is linked with Textile city of Faisalabad with a 4-lane highway, built on BOO (Built operate & Own) basis. A historical Grand Trunk road which was a major artery during subcontinent era, originally built by Sher Shah Suri, the Afghan ruler, leads toward Indian border passing through the city.
