= Ganda Singhwala railway station =

Railway station in Punjab, Pakistan

General information
- Owner: Ministry of Railways

Other information
- Station code: GSS

History
- Former names: Great Indian Peninsula Railway

The Ganda Singhwala railway station (Urdu: گنڈا سنگھ والا ریلوے اسٹیشن) is a railway station located in Kasur District, Punjab, Pakistan.

== See also ==
- List of railway stations in Pakistan
- Pakistan Railways
