= List of cities in Pakistan by population =

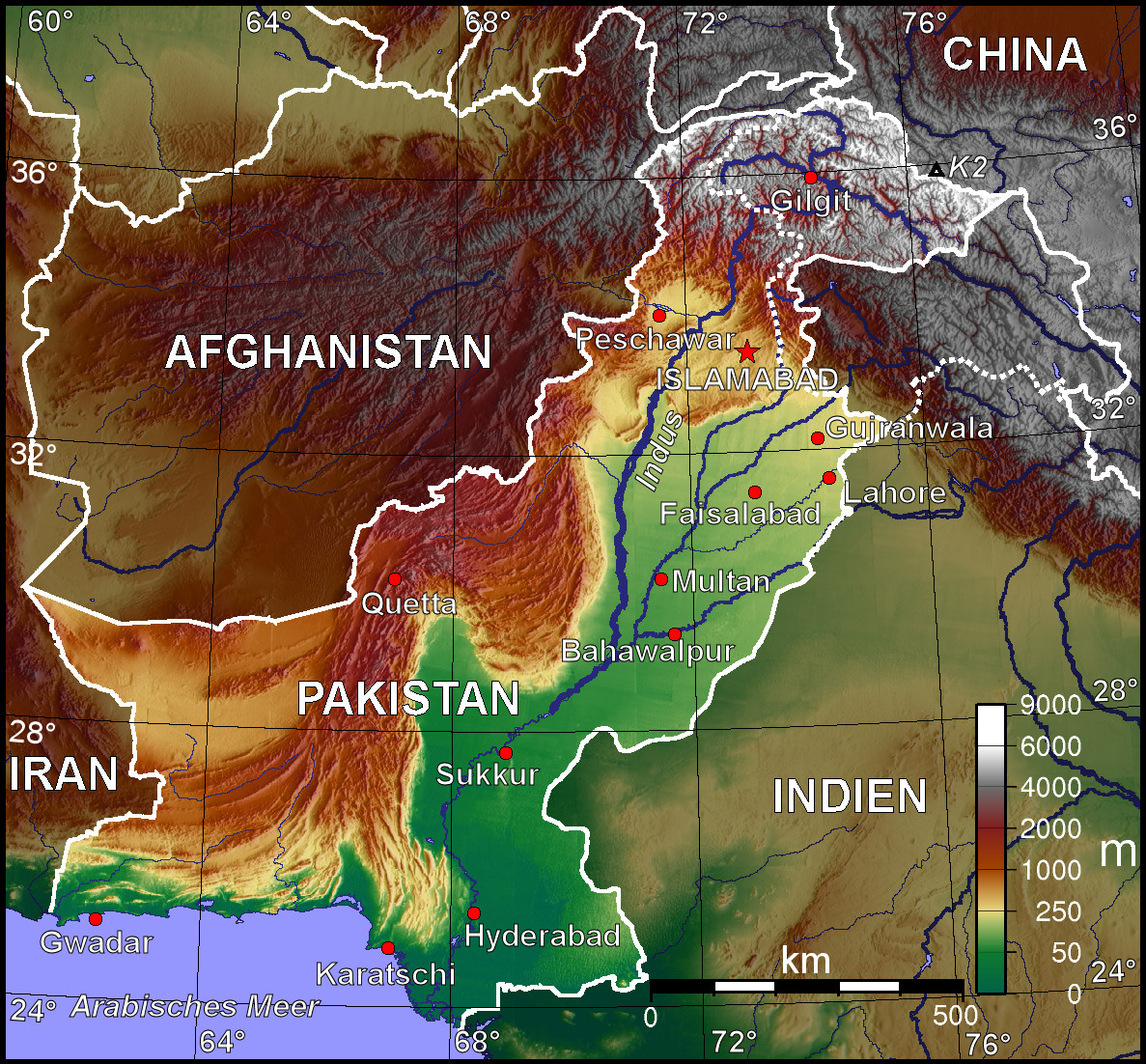
Topographical map of Pakistan (showing elevation)

This is a list showing the most populous cities in Pakistan as of the 2023 Census of Pakistan. City populations found in this list only refer to the population found within the city's defined limits and any adjacent cantonment, if exists (except for Gujranwala and Okara). The census totals below come from the Pakistan Bureau of Statistics for the four provinces of Pakistan and the Islamabad Capital Territory, and from the Planning and Development Department of Azad Jammu Kashmir (PND AJK) for cities of Azad Kashmir.

As of the 2023 Pakistani census, there are two megacities with a population of over ten million in Pakistan. Overall, 127 cities in the country have a population of over 100,000. Of these 127 cities, 81 are located in the country's most populous province, Punjab, 22 in Sindh, 13 in Khyber Pakhtunkhwa, 8 in Balochistan, two in Azad Kashmir, and one is the Islamabad Capital Territory itself. It is unknown whether Gilgit-Baltistan has any city with over 100,000 people or not, as 2017 census results issued by the Government of Gilgit–Baltistan do not give figures for the population of cities in Gilgit–Baltistan. As in the previous census in 1998, the largest city of Gilgit-Baltistan was Gilgit, with 56,701 inhabitants.

== List ==
- Federal capital
- Provincial capital
- Divisional capital

City	Pop. (2023 census)	Pop. (2017 census)	Pop. (1998 census)	Province	Picture	Location
Karachi	18,868,021▲(+26.49%)	14,916,456 (+59.67%)	9,339,023 (+79.31%)	Sindh	Karachi	24°51′36″N 67°0′36″E
Lahore	13,004,135▲(+16.88%)	11,126,285 (+113.63%)	5,209,088 (+74.34%)	Punjab	Lahore	31.5497°N 74.3436°E
Faisalabad	3,691,999▲(+15.20%)	3,204,726 (+59.51%)	2,008,861 (+81.95%)	Punjab	Faisalabad	31.4187°N 73.0791°E
Rawalpindi	3,357,612▲(+60.02%)	2,098,231 (48.89%)	1,409,768 (77.40%)	Punjab	Rawalpindi	33.5973°N 73.0433°E
Gujranwala	2,511,118 ▲(+23.88%)	2,027,001 (78.93%)	1,132,509 (88.60%)	Punjab	Gujranwala	32.1617°N 74.1883°E
Multan	2,215,381▲(+18.35%)	1,871,843 (+56.39%)	1,197,384 (+63.57%)	Punjab	Multan	30.1575°N 71.5249°E
Hyderabad	1,921,275▲(+10.78%)	1,734,309 (+48.53%)	1,166,894 (+55.37%)	Sindh	Hyderabad	25.3960°N 68.3578°E
Peshawar	1,905,975 ▼(-3.25%)	1,970,042 (+100.6%)	982,816 (+77.1%)	Khyber Pakhtunkhwa	Peshawar	34.0151°N 71.5249°E
Quetta	1,565,546▲(+56.37%)	1,001,205 (+77.1%)	565,137 (+97.6%)	Balochistan	Quetta	30.1798°N 66.9750°E
Islamabad	1,108,872▲(+9.81%)	1,009,832 (+90.7%)	529,180 (+159.4%)	Islamabad Capital Territory	Islamabad	33.6844°N 73.0479°E
Sargodha	975,886 ▲(+48.26%)	658,208 (+43.6%)	458,440 (+82.8%)	Punjab	Sargodha	32.0836°N 72.6711°E
Sialkot	911,817 ▲(+39.03%)	655,852 (+55.6%)	421,502 (+39.6%)	Punjab	Sialkot	32.4945°N 74.5229°E
Bahawalpur	903,795 ▲(+18.59%)	762,111 (+86.7%)	408,395 (+124.9%)	Punjab	Bahawalpur	29.3956°N 71.6836°E
Jhang	606,533 ▲(+46.46%)	414,131 (+41.3%)	293,366 (+50.1%)	Punjab	Jhang	31.2690°N 72.3169°E
Sheikhupura	591,424 ▲(+25.00%)	473,129 (+68.8%)	280,263 (+98.4%)	Punjab	Sheikhupura	31.7131°N 73.9783°E
Gujrat	574,240 ▲(+47.04%)	390,533 (+55.1%)	251,792 (+62.1%)	Punjab	Gujrat	32.5742°N 74.0754°E
Sukkur	563,851 ▲(+12.79%)	499,900	335,551	Sindh	Sukkar	27.7052°N 68.8574°E
Larkana	551,716 ▲(+12.48%)	490,508	270,283	Sindh	Larkana	27.5589°N 68.2120°E
Sahiwal	538,344 ▲(+38.18%)	389,605	208,778	Punjab	Sahiwal	30.6682°N 73.1114°E
Okara	533,693 ▲(+49.10%)	357,935	201,815	Punjab	Okara	30.8100°N 73.4590°E
Rahim Yar Khan	519,261 ▲(+8.84%)	477,100	233,537	Punjab	Rahim Yar Khan	
Kasur	510,875 ▲(+42.54%)	358,409	245,321	Punjab		
Dera Ghazi Khan	494,464 ▲(+23.91%)	399,064	190,542	Punjab	Dera Ghazi Khan	
Wah Cantonment	400,733 ▲(+5.43%)	380,103	198,891	Punjab		
Mardan	368,302 ▲(+2.70%)	358,604	245,926	Khyber Pakhtunkhwa		
Nawabshah	363,138 ▲(+30.00%)	279,338	189,244	Sindh		
Burewala	361,664 ▲(+55.73%)	231,797 (+52.40%)	152,097	Punjab		
Mingora	361,112 ▲(+9.07%)	331,091	173,868	Khyber Pakhtunkhwa		
Hafizabad	318,621 ▲(+29.63%)	245,784	133,678	Punjab		
Chiniot	318,165 ▲(+14.14%)	278,747	172,522	Punjab		
Jhelum	312,426 ▲(+63.89%)	190,425 (+29.20%)	147,392	Punjab	Jhelum	32.9425°N 73.725556°E
Kāmoke	292,023 ▲(+16.92%)	249,767	152,288	Punjab		
Khanewal	281,890 ▲(+24.22%)	227,059 (+69.46%)	133,986	Punjab		
Sadiqabad	274,210 ▲(+13.86%)	239,677 (+65.99%)	144,391	Punjab		
Turbat	268,625 ▲(+24.79%)	213,557 (+211.29%)	68,603	Balochistan	Turbat	
Mirpur Khas	267,833 ▲(+14.48%)	233,916 (+23.33%)	189,671	Sindh		
Muridke	254,291 ▲(+34.60%)	166,652 (+48.86%)	111,951	Punjab		
Khanpur	247,170 ▲(+30.49%)	184,793 (+53.51%)	120,382	Punjab		
Bahawalnagar	241,873 ▲(+39.84%)	161,033 (+44.67%)	111,313	Punjab		
Kohat	235,880 ▲(+3.02%)	228,779 (+80.67%)	126,627	Khyber Pakhtunkhwa		
Muzaffargarh	235,541 ▲(+12.35%)	209,604 (+69.85%)	123,404	Punjab		
Abbottabad	234,395 ▲(+12.39%)	208,491 (+96.50%)	106,101	Khyber Pakhtunkhwa		
Mandi Bahauddin	232,361 ▲(+17.49%)	198,609 (+99.62%)	99,496	Punjab		
Daska	228,626 ▲(+23.39%)	175,170 (+70.26%)	102,883	Punjab		
Pakpattan	221,280 ▲(+25.30%)	176,693 (+62.05%)	109,033	Punjab		
Dera Ismail Khan	220,575 ▲(+1.42%)	217,457 (+136.07%)	92,114	Khyber Pakhtunkhwa		
Jacobabad	219,315 ▲(+14.81%)	191,076 (+37.68%)	138,780	Sindh		
Chakwal	218,356 ▲(+41.56%)	138,146 (+71.59%)	80,508	Punjab		
Khuzdar	218,112 ▲(+19.28%)	182,927 (+100.89%)	91,057	Balochistan		
Gojra	214,349 ▲(+22.78%)	174,860 (+48.32%)	117,892	Punjab		
Vehari	210,288 ▲(+31.75%)	145,464 (+54.19%)	94,343	Punjab		
Shikarpur	204,938 ▲(+4.88%)	195,437 (+44.89%)	134,883	Sindh		
Ahmedpur East	196,618 ▲(+32.25%)	133,369 (+38.33%)	96,415	Punjab		
Hub	195,661 ▲(+11.57%)	175,376 (+179.43%)	62,763	Balochistan		
Chishtian	192,403 ▲(+28.21%)	149,939 (+46.59%)	102,287	Punjab		
Khairpur	191,044 ▲(+4.19%)	183,181 (+73.41%)	105,637	Sindh		
Dadu	188,317 ▲(+10.02%)	171,191 (+66.93%)	102,550	Sindh		
Samundri	186,371 ▲(+16.81%)	156,991 (+185.92%)	54,908	Punjab		
Ferozwala	177,238 ▲(+20.38%)	141,405 (+155.09%)	55,433	Punjab		
Attock	176,544 ▲(+20.64%)	146,396 (+109.95%)	69,729	Punjab		
Tando Adam	174,291 ▲(+14.56%)	152,617 (+45.48%)	104,907	Sindh		
Tando Allahyar	171,185 ▲(+9.36%)	156,562 (+82.45%)	85,812	Sindh		
Jaranwala	170,872 ▲(+12.02%)	150,380 (+40.56%)	106,985	Punjab		
Bholari	169,613 ▲(+7.2%)	158,239	...	Sindh		
Muzaffarabad	...	149,913 (+75.41%)	85,462	Azad Kashmir		
Hasilpur	168,146 ▲(+45.28%)	115,536 (+62.05%)	71,295	Punjab		
Kamalia	166,617 ▲(+22.84%)	135,641 (+39.37%)	97,324	Punjab		
Kot Abdul Malik	162,030 ▲(+12.93%)	143,434 (+125.79%)	63,525	Punjab		
Panjgur	157,693 ▲(+196.10%)	80,411 (+277.7%)	21,297	Balochistan	Panjgur	
Arif Wala	157,063 ▲(+39.33%)	111,403 (+50.19%)	74,174	Punjab		
Gujranwala Cantonment	156,929 ▲(+14.27%)	137,302 (+47.49%)	93,093	Punjab		
Swabi	156,496 ▲(+21.26%)	123,412 (+53.96%)	80,157	Khyber Pakhtunkhwa		
Jampur	155,243 ▲	87,857 ▲	52,516	Punjab		
Jatoi	155,196 ▲(+41.86%)	109,424 (+180.68%)	38,986	Punjab		
Wazirabad	152,624 ▲(+19.33%)	128,060 (+41.98%)	90,197	Punjab		
Layyah	151,274 ▲(+16.57%)	126,361 (+74.73%)	72,319	Punjab		
Shujabad	151,115 ▲	80,098 ▲	57,409	Punjab		
Haroonabad	149,679 ▲(+38.23%)	107,858 (+71.54%)	62,878	Punjab		
Jalalpur Jattan	146,743 ▲(52.5%)	96,210	69,395	Punjab		
Umerkot	144,558 ▲(+7.88%)	134,052 (+276.98%)	35,559	Sindh		
Lodhran	144,512 ▲(+22.26%)	117,851 (+79.92%)	65,501	Punjab		
Moro	142,685 ▲	95,398	61,033	Sindh		
Kot Addu	142,161 ▲(+9.69%)	129,703 (+60.68%)	80,720	Punjab		
Mian Channu	140,112 ▲	90,157 ▲	64,859	Punjab		
Khushab	139,905 ▲(+17.56%)	119,384 (+35.88%)	87,859	Punjab		
Rajanpur	137,553 ▲	99,097 ▲	43,643	Punjab		
Mansehra	137,278 ▲(+7.57%)	127,623 (+157.65%)	49,534	Khyber Pakhtunkhwa		
Taxila	136,900 ▲(+12.85%)	121,952 (+69.66%)	71,882	Punjab		
Mirpur	...	124,352 (+7.53%)	115,641	Azad Kashmir		
Kabal	132,549 ▲(+12.93%)	118,103 (+55.62%)	75,891	Khyber Pakhtunkhwa		
Bhakkar	131,658 ▲(+16.16%)	113,018 (+64.04%)	68,896	Punjab		
Narowal	130,692 ▲(+21.83%)	103,067 (+80.65%)	57,052	Punjab		
Chaman	130,139 ▲(+5.34%)	123,191 (+116.92%)	56,792	Balochistan		
Mianwali	129,500 ▲(+8.94%)	118,883 (+48.29%)	80,171	Punjab		
Shakargarh	126,742 ▲	81,643 ▲	50,747	Punjab		
Mailsi	125,431 ▲	82,322 ▲	55,434	Punjab		
Nowshera	122,953 ▲(+2.36%)	120,131 (+33.76%)	89,813	Khyber Pakhtunkhwa		
Dipalpur	122,759 ▲	99,753 ▲	57,224	Punjab		
Haveli Lakha	122,389 ▲	78,257 ▲	52,207	Punjab		
Lala Musa	121,036 ▲(+32.1%)	91,566	59,996	Punjab		
Shahdadkot	120,687 ▲(+1.04%)	118,915 (+96.76%)	60,436	Sindh		
Charsadda	120,170 ▲(+5.02%)	114,565 (+31.35%)	87,218	Khyber Pakhtunkhwa		
Ghotki	119,879 ▲(+7.68%)	111,321 (+110.74%)	52,823	Sindh		
Sambrial	119,571 ▲(+9.17%)	109,479 (+120.84%)	49,574	Punjab		
Bhalwal	117,982 ▲(+17.68%)	100,135 (+62.76%)	61,523	Punjab		
Badin	117,455 ▲(+3.45%)	112,420 (+78.89%)	62,843	Sindh		
Taunsa	115,704 ▲	97,193 ▲	38,297	Punjab		
Barikot	115,045 ▲(+22.1%)	94,245	...	Khyber Pakhtunkhwa		
Phool Nagar	114,530 ▲(+23.3%)	92,842	56,113	Punjab		
Tando Muhammad Khan	114,406 ▲(+12.96%)	101,863 (+55.76%)	65,396	Sindh		
Pattoki	113,735 ▲	87,757 ▲	58,961	Punjab		
Shahdadpur	113,342 ▲(+13.7%)	99,653 (59.0%)	62,655 (+48.8%)	Sindh		
Jauharabad	113,188 ▲	91,357 ▲	40,175	Punjab		
Kamber Ali Khan	112,313 ▲(+10.68%)	101,474 (+73.85%)	58,369	Sindh		
Chichawatni	112,191 ▲	94,733 ▲	72,721	Punjab		
Farooqabad	109,717 ▲	77,591 ▲	59,015	Punjab		
Pishin	107,646 ▲(202%)	35,577 (+55.1%)	22,955	Balochistan		
Dera Murad Jamali	106,952 ▲(+10.7%)	96,591 (+151.9%)	38,341	Balochistan		
Kotri	106,615 ▲(+5.27%)	101,124 (-61.01%)	62,085	Sindh		
Sangla Hill	103,709 ▲	61,498 ▲	50,368	Punjab		
Gujar Khan	103,284 ▲	90,149 ▲	57,099	Punjab		
Kharian	103,036 ▲	87,569 ▲	73,627	Punjab		
Pasrur	102,717 ▲	82,457 ▲	45,747	Punjab		
Shabqadar	102,340 ▲(+11.4%)	91,851 (+65.7%)	55,439	Khyber Pakhtunkhwa		
Kot Radha Kishan	102,057 ▲	58,894 ▲	39,555	Punjab		
Ludhewala Waraich	100,331 ▲	92,020 ▲	33,928	Punjab		
Renala Khurd	100,054 ▲	54,160 ▲	32,337	Punjab		

== List of cities with population from 50,000 to 100,000 ==
Mini Cities or Large Towns by population in Pakistan
No.	City	Pop. (2023)	Pop. (2017)	Province
128	Kandhkot	99,155 ▼	100,698	Sindh
129	Uch Sharif	98,852 ▲	42,684	Punjab
130	Dera Allah Yar	98,761 ▲	80,908	Balochistan
131	Fazilpur	98,627 ▲	76,809	Punjab
132	Kahror Pacca	98,325 ▲	82,137	Punjab
133	Dijkot	96,934 ▲	39,873	Punjab
134	Khurrianwala	96,743 ▲	75,907	Punjab
135	Hujra Shah Muqeem	95,921 ▲	76,629	Punjab
136	Nankana Sahib	94,988 ▲	79,458	Punjab
137	Dinga	94,252 ▲	50,793	Punjab
138	Rohri	92,135 ▲	69,920	Sindh
139	Kabirwala	91,932 ▲	74,904	Punjab
140	Haripur	91,915 ▲	85,739	Khyber Pakhtunkhwa
141	Kunjah	90,905 ▲	32,588	Punjab
142	Daharki	90,177 ▲	86,286	Sindh
143	Jalalpur Pirwala	89,679 ▲	67,453	Punjab
144	Shahkot	89,638 ▲	73,491	Punjab
145	Thul	88,554 ▲	70,158	Sindh
146	Jamshoro	88,190 ▲	32,768	Sindh
147	Chunian	87,547 ▲	72,589	Punjab
148	Naushahro Feroze	87,416 ▲	38,204	Sindh
149	Chowk Azam	87,376 ▲	67,421	Punjab
150	Takht-i-Bahi	85,040 ▲	80,721	Khyber Pakhtunkhwa
151	Dina	84,629 ▲	56,949	Punjab
152	Fort Abbas	83,192 ▲	61,528	Punjab
153	Ratodero	81,935 ▲	67,498	Sindh
154	Chenab Nagar	81,695 ▲	64,204	Punjab
155	Mustafabad	81,550 ▲	60,578	Punjab
156	Fateh Jang	81,321 ▲	66,500	Punjab
157	Kharan	80,806 ▲	51,388	Balochistan
158	Ghakhar	80,320 ▲	65,517	Punjab
159	Alahabad	80,097 ▲	61,935	Punjab
160	Sui	79,567 ▲	72,740	Balochistan
161	Talagang	79,431 ▲	64,083	Punjab
162	Zahirpir	76,979 ▲	48,493	Punjab
163	Ali Pur Chatta	76,964 ▲	60,983	Punjab
164	Pano Akil	76,942 ▲	75,805	Sindh
165	Bahrain	76,728 ▲	61,787	Khyber Pakhtunkhwa
166	Paharpur	76,027 ▲	69,289	Khyber Pakhtunkhwa
167	Taxila	75,444 ▲	67,246	Punjab
168	Kahuta	75,349 ▲	60,610	Punjab
169	Sehwan Sharif	75,167 ▲	66,923	Sindh
170	Topi	74,867 ▲	52,983	Khyber Pakhtunkhwa
171	Mirpur Mathelo	74,651 ▼	75,270	Sindh
172	Qila Didar Singh	74,523 ▲	66,491	Punjab
173	Kot Mithan	74,479 ▲	36,755	Punjab
174	Matli	74,402 ▲	62,556	Sindh
175	Tando Jam	74,303 ▲	71,760	Sindh
176	Sanghar	74,112 ▼	75,410	Sindh
177	Alipur	74,095 ▲	44,504	Punjab
178	Sarai Alamgir	73,967 ▲	54,864	Punjab
179	Batkhela	73,525 ▲	68,200	Khyber Pakhtunkhwa
180	Sakrand	72,040 ▲	65,699	Sindh
181	Hala	71,094 ▲	65,731	Sindh
182	Bhera	70,921 ▲	40,320	Punjab
183	Zehri	70,910 ▲	37,854	Balochistan
184	Gwadar	70,852 ▼	90,762	Balochistan
185	Lakki Marwat	70,759 ▲	59,465	Khyber Pakhtunkhwa
186	Hasan Abdal	69,529 ▲	63,218	Punjab
187	Sibi	69,300 ▲	64,427	Balochistan
188	Buleda	68,752 ▲	39,813	Balochistan
189	Darya Khan	68,622 ▲	60,856	Punjab
190	Minchinabad	67,164 ▲	56,563	Punjab
191	Narang Mandi	67,137 ▲	45,770	Punjab
192	Mehar	67,082 ▲	56,200	Sindh
193	Liaqatpur	66,933 ▲	51,888	Punjab
194	Pindi Bhattian	66,511 ▲	55,356	Punjab
195	Raja Jang	66,404 ▲	30,855	Punjab
196	Tasp	66,030 ▲	35,890	Balochistan
197	Usta Muhammad	64,632 ▼	77,097	Balochistan
198	Pindi Gheb	63,810 ▲	45,195	Punjab
199	Chowk Sarwar Shaheed	63,421 ▲	56,117	Punjab
200	Kot Momin	63,411 ▲	50,818	Punjab
201	Phalia	62,453 ▲	52,789	Punjab
202	Shehr Sultan	62,184 ▲	49,844	Punjab
203	Kallar Syedan	60,941 ▲	54,239	Punjab
204	Yazman	60,738 ▲	48,883	Punjab
205	Chak Jhumra	60,131 ▲	48,796	Punjab
206	Kot Chutta	59,870 ▲	51,666	Punjab
207	Gambat	59,790 ▲	53,354	Sindh
208	Nowshera Virkan	59,639 ▲	49,377	Punjab
209	Khipro	58,307 ▲	51,081	Sindh
210	Karak	58,065 ▲	51,149	Khyber Pakhtunkhwa
211	Mehrabpur	57,978 ▲	53,608	Sindh
212	Sahiwal	57,374 ▲	48,286	Punjab
213	Chitral	57,157 ▲	49,794	Khyber Pakhtunkhwa
214	Khwazakhela	57,113 ▲	48,027	Khyber Pakhtunkhwa
215	Jehangira	57,011 ▼	52,839	Khyber Pakhtunkhwa
216	Chaubara	57,002 ▲	48,371	Punjab
217	Jand	56,254 ▲	48,194	Punjab
218	Jamrud	56,642 ▼	63,843	Khyber Pakhtunkhwa
219	Khalabat	55,850 ▲	47,285	Khyber Pakhtunkhwa
220	Pir Jo Goth	54,266 ▲	47,518	Sindh
221	Safdarabad	54,242 ▲	27,739	Punjab
222	Makli	54,137 ▲	47,239	Sindh
223	Naudero	52,846 ▲	48,983	Sindh
224	Zafarwal	52,639 ▲	39,319	Punjab
225	Lalian	52,542 ▲	45,411	Punjab
226	Fateh Pur	52,255 ▲	44,084	Punjab
227	Dunyapur	51,888 ▲	41,554	Punjab
228	Mananwala	51,746 ▲	45,740	Punjab
229	Thatta	51,723 ▼	54,697	Sindh
230	Matta	51,821 ▲	42,647	Khyber Pakhtunkhwa
231	Malakwal	51,327 ▲	43,423	Punjab
232	Ubauro	50,981 ▲	44,496	Sindh
233	Sukheke	50,458 ▲	42,609	Punjab
234	Jahanian	50,318 ▲	43,646	Punjab
235	Khairpur Nathan Shah	50,786 ▲	41,320	Sindh

== See also ==
- List of metropolitan areas in Pakistan
- List of districts in Pakistan
- Districts of Pakistan ranked by household size
- Demography of Pakistan
  - List of cities in Azad Kashmir by population
  - List of cities in Balochistan, Pakistan by population
  - List of cities in Gilgit-Baltistan by population
  - List of cities in Khyber Pakhtunkhwa by population
  - List of cities in Sindh by population
  - List of cities in Punjab, Pakistan by population
