= Ladha Singhwala =

Ladha Singhwali
- Location within Pakistan
- Coordinates: 30.47°N 74.11°E
- Country: Pakistan
- Province: Punjab
- Elevation: 178 m (584 ft)
- Time zone: UTC+5 (PST)

Ladha Singhwali is a village in Kasur District of Pakistan's Punjab province. It is located at 30°47'10N 74°11'35E with an altitude of 178 metres (587 feet).
