= Baba Kot =

Village in Kasur District, Balochistan, southwestern Pakistan

Coordinates: 31°02′N 73°46′E

Babakot is a large village in Kasur District, southwestern Pakistan, in the province of Balochistan.
