= Sabuana =

Pakistani village

Coordinates: 31°31′N 73°14′E

Sabuana (Arabic: صابوآنه) is a village in Khurrianwala, Faisalabad, Pakistan. The majority of residents are Rajput.

== Industry ==
Textile industries in the area include Kamal Group, Bismillah Textile, Ahmad Jamal Limited, Gohar Textile Mills, Chawla Enterprises and Nimra Textile.

== Sports ==
Cricket, football (soccer), kabaddi, cockfighting, and pigeon flying are popular games in Sabuana. Parwaz Cricket Club is a registered team of Sabuana.

== Religious Places ==
Darbar Peer Ata Muhammad Shah , Darbar Peer Mubarak Ali Shah

== See also ==
- Khurrianwala
