= Fazilpur, Pakistan =

Fazilpur فاضِل پور
- City
- Location of Fazilpur Fazilpur (Pakistan)
- Coordinates: 29.293113°N 70.452167°E
- Country: Pakistan
- Province: Punjab
- Division: Dera Ghazi Khan
- District: Rajanpur
- Established: 1873; 153 years ago
- Municipal Committee Status: 2012; 14 years ago

Government
  - Type: Municipal Committee
  - Chairman: Vacant
  - MNA: Hafeez-ur-Rehman Dreshak
  - Deputy Commissioner Rajanpur: Shafqat Ullah Mushtaq
- Elevation: 255 m (837 ft)

Population (2023)
  - City: 98,627
  - Rank: 131st in Pakistan
- Time zone: UTC+05:00 (PKT)
  - Summer (DST): DST is not observed
- ZIP Code: 33400
- NWD (area) code: 604
- ISO 3166 code: PK-PB

Fazilpur (Urdu: فاضِل پور) is a city located in Rajanpur Tehsil of Rajanpur District in the division of Dera Ghazi Khan Division of Punjab province of Pakistan. It is said that, a person named Fazil Gujjar camped on the bank of Fazil Canal in Fazilpur. Fazilpur city and Fazil Wah (Canal) were named after him. Fazilpur Dhandi railway station is also located here where the Khushal Khan Khattak Express train runs from Peshawar to Karachi through Fazilpur daily.

== Demographics ==
Population

Historical population
Year	Pop.	±%
1998	24,016	—
2017	76,809	+219.8%
2023	98,627	+28.4%

According to the 2017 census, Fazilpur had a population of 76,809. In the 2023 census, its population increased to 98,627, representing a growth of 21,818 people (approximately 28.4%) between 2017 and 2023.

Languages

Languages of Fazilpur MC (2023 Census)
1. Saraiki (88.7%)
2. Urdu (6.80%)
3. Punjabi (2.90%)
4. Balochi (0.90%)
5. Others (0.70%)

According to the 2023 census, Saraiki is spoken by 88.7% of the population of Fazilpur city. Urdu accounts for 6.8%, Punjabi for 2.9%, and Balochi for 0.9%, while other languages account for the remaining 0.7%.
