= Alahabad, Pakistan =

Allahabad الٰہ آباد Alahabad
- City
- Location of Allahabad Allahabad (Pakistan) Allahabad (South Asia) Allahabad (Asia)
- Coordinates: 30.875480°N 74.057942°E
- Country: Pakistan
- Province: (Punjab, Pakistan) Punjab
- District: Kasur

Government
  - Type: Municipal Committee
  - Chairman: Vacant
  - Vice Chairman: Vacant

Population (2023)
  - City: 80,097
  - Rank: 159th in Pakistan
- Time zone: UTC+5 (PST)
  - Summer (DST): UTC+6 (PDT)

Allahabad or Alahabad (Urdu: الٰہ آباد) is a city in Chunian tehsil of Kasur District in the Punjab province of Pakistan.

== Demographics ==
Population

Historical population
Year	Pop.	±% p.a.
2017	61,935	—
2023	80,097	+4.38%

According to 2023 census, Allahabad city had a population of 80,097.

Languages

Languages of Allahabad City (2023 Census)
1. Punjabi (90.2%)
2. Mewati (5.70%)
3. Urdu (3.80%)
4. Others (0.30%)

According to the 2023 Pakistani census, Punjabi is the primary native language spoken in Allahabad, accounting for 90.2% of the population. Mewati is the largest minority language spoken by 5.70% of residents, followed by Urdu at 3.80%, while other languages make up 0.30%.

== See also ==
- Kasur
- Mustafaabad
