= Baba Ram Thaman Shrine =

Hindu temple in Punjab, Pakistan

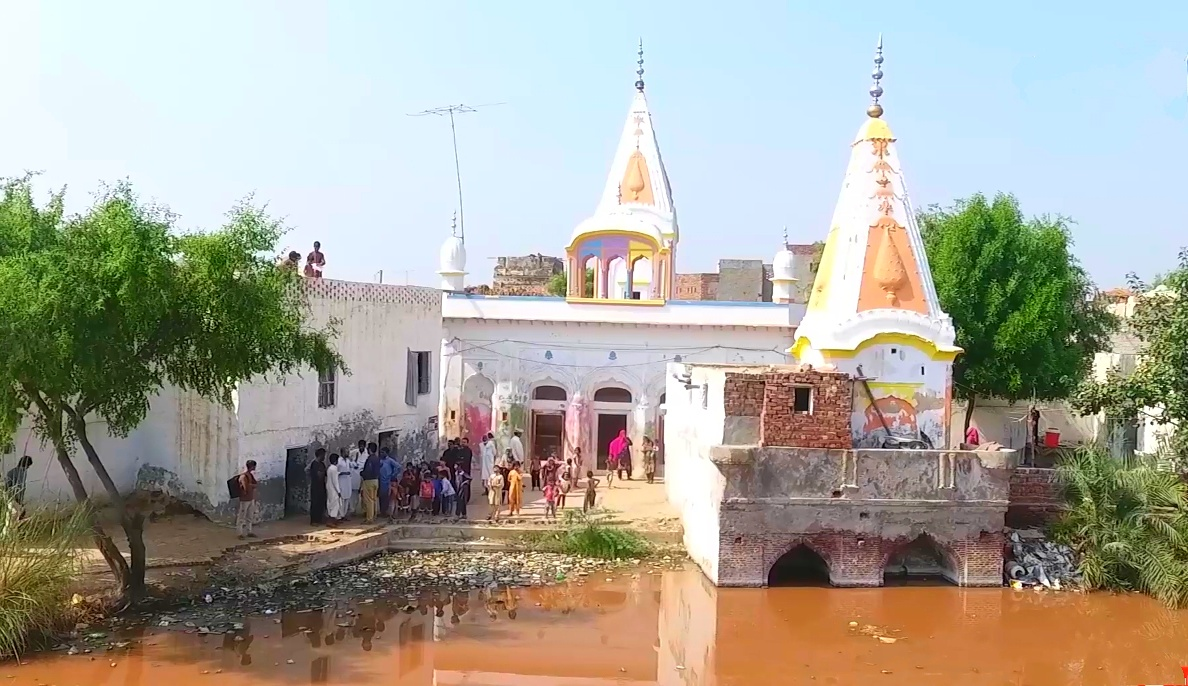
- Baba Ram Thaman Shrine

- Location within Punjab, Pakistan Location within Pakistan Location within Asia

Religion
- Affiliation: Hinduism
- District: Kasur District
- Deity: Krishna

Location
- State: Punjab, Pakistan
- Country: Pakistan
- Interactive map of Baba Ram Thaman Shrine
- Coordinates: 31°09′40.7″N 74°16′27.3″E

Architecture
- Architect: Baba Ram Thaman Bairagi
- Type: Hindu temple

Baba Ram Thaman Shrine is a Hindu Shrine located in the Khala Kharu village, in Kasur District in the Punjab province of Pakistan. The Shrine is dedicated to Ram Thaman, a 16th-century Vaishnav saint. The Shrine is famous for its annual Vaisakhi fair. The Shrine is a Smadh i.e. a sacred space constructed over the ashes and burial ground of a Hindu saint. This is the one of 36 Dwaras of Ramanandi Sampradaya of Vaishnavas.

== History ==
The Baba Ram Thaman was a 16th-century Hindu saint and an older cousin of Guru Nanak, the founder of Sikhism. In the 16th century, he set up his camp near the Khala Kharu village. After his death, a shrine was built at the place. Several temples and a pond were later added over time. His devotees also settled at the temple complex till the Partition. The Vaisakhi fair was held annually at the shrine since 16th century CE and it was attended by around 60,000 pilgrims.

Even after the Partition, the Vaisaki celebrations are conducted annually in the Shrine and the majority of the attendants are Muslims.

== See also ==
- Hinglaj Mata mandir
- Ramapir Temple, Tando Allahyar
