= Basit Jehangir Sheikh =

- با سط جہا نگیر شيخ
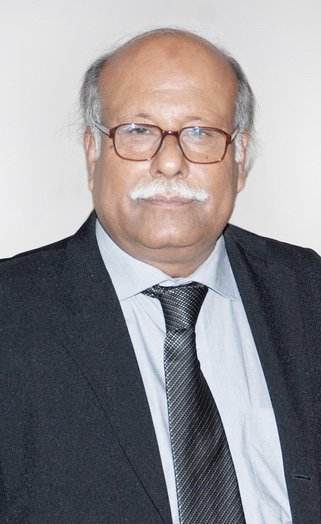

Member of 8th Provincial Assembly of the Punjab
- In office 9 April 1977 – 5 July 1977

Personal details
- Born: 13 April 1949 Kasur, Pakistan
- Died: 20 October 2010 (aged 61)
- Party: Pakistan Peoples Party (PPP)
- Spouse: Dr. Bilqees Basit
- Children: Faisal Basit Sheikh Adv (Son); Dr. Sania Basit (Daughter)

Basit Jehangir Sheikh (Urdu: با سط جہا نگیر شيخ, 13 April 1949 – 20 October 2010) was a Pakistani politician and a founding member of Zulfikar Ali Bhutto's Pakistan Peoples Party (PPP). As the first District President of PPP in Kasur, he played a vital role in the party's early political landscape. A committed leader, Sheikh was among the youngest figures to shape the party's foundation and remained actively engaged in politics throughout his career. His father, Sheikh Muhammad Jehangir, was a man of many accomplishments. A double master’s degree holder, he was not only a dedicated educator but also a businessman. Sheikh Muhammad Jehangir was a prominent social and political leader in Kasur, serving as the Secretary of Anjuman-e-Islamia Kasur. His vision led to the establishment of numerous medical and academic institutions in the city, cementing his legacy as a key figure in the development of Kasur. His dedication to the welfare of his community and his leadership in various capacities inspired those around him.

== Education ==
Basit Jehangir Sheikh received his early education at a local school in Kasur before completing his intermediate studies at Islamia Degree College, Kasur. He later graduated from Forman Christian College, Lahore.

== Political career ==
Since 26 November 1967, when Basit Jehangir welcomed Bhutto in Kasur, and up to 25 December 2007 (2:30am), when he last met Shaheed Bibi sahiba in Islamabad, Jehangir and Bhutto had a 40-year-long association of loyalty and steadfastness. In return, the confidence and affection that Chairman Bhutto, Begum Nusrat Bhutto, Shaheed Bibi sahiba and now Co-chairman Asif Ali Zardari had shown to him over these years was the biggest asset of his life. From 1967 to 2007, each political upheaval and countless detentions had tested his mettle, but each time Jehangir had come out more resilient than before.

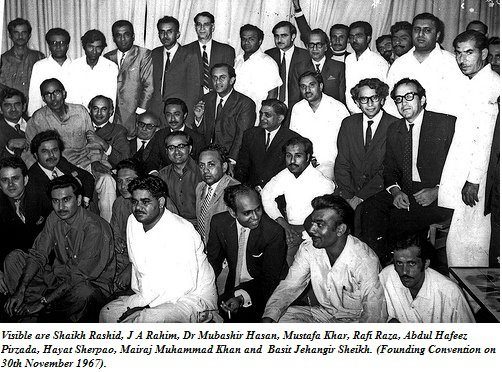
At the Lahore residence of Mubashir Hassan, On 30 November 1967.

In March 1968, Begum Nusrat Bhutto started her campaign to obtain Shaheed Bhutto's release from Ayub Khan's detention at Kasur. Basit Jehangir organized a big protest rally that was led by Begum Sahiba. The passion, anger and impact of the rally is still remembered by (now) prominent TV anchorperson Iftikhar Ahmad.

In 1970, Jehangir was appointed the first General Secretary of PPP, Tehsil Kasur. Shaheed Chairman Bhutto visited Kasur on 17 August 1970, inaugurated a Party office in Kasur, attended a reception and addressed a public meeting. It was during this meeting that Basit Jehangir warned the Shaheed Chairman not to award a party post to Ahmad Raza Kasuri, as betrayal was in Raza Kasuri's blood. The late Mehmud Ali Kasuri and Rasul Baksh Talpur were present on the occasion, as was Mr. Omar Mehmud Kasuri advocate (younger son of late Mehmud Ali Kasuri), who still remembers the incident. Shaheed Bhutto would always recall that early warning.

Chairman Bhutto did not have to wait for long to see the truth behind Basit Jehangir's warning. Ahmad Raza wanted the provincial assembly ticket for Kasur city to be awarded to Yaqub Maan, ex-MPA. Bhutto sahib ignored his choice and awarded it to a party loyalist Ghulam Hyder Sohail. Upon this Ahmad Raza telephoned the Chairman at 70 Clifton and threatened that if this decision was not changed, he wouldn't let Mr. Bhutto enter Punjab. The call was taken by Mumtaz Ali Bhutto, who gave him a befitting reply. Basit Jehangir's insight impressed the chairman and brought them further close.

This closeness, however, created problems elsewhere in the district. Mr. Malik Meraj Khalid was offended by the candid criticism that Basit Jehangir would make against devious politics in the party. On 7 May 1974, Basit Jehangir was shot multiple times by Yaqub Mann's son. After six months of hospitalization involving multiple surgeries, he survived and reported back to the chairman for duty.

In 1976, Jehangir was made the first District President of PPP Kasur, by Chairman Bhutto. He became an MPA on the PPP ticket in 1977 elections. The joy was short-lived, as Jehangir was arrested and detained in Kasur jail in the very first sweep of General Zia's martial law. On 10 December 1978, Begum Bhutto held a meeting in Lahore, which was attended by District Presidents of Lahore, Gujranwala, Sheikhupura and Kasur. Begum Sahiba informed them that she was about to launch an anti-Zia campaign immediately. After all other district presidents expressed their inability to host Begum Sahiba, Basit Jehangir offered his hospitality. So, from the courtyard of his house in Kasur, on 13 December 1978, Begum Sahiba launched the "Save Bhutto" campaign. Seven cases under different martial law regulations were registered against him, resulting in repeated detentions. On the advice of party leadership he left Kasur and went in exile, returning in 1980. Jehangir kept the party alive in the dark years of 1980 to 1986. Bibi sahiba, on her return to Pakistan in 1986, elevated him to the decision making level by appointing him to be a member of Punjab Parliamentary Board, where again it fell to his lot to continuously confront the axis of Malik Meraj Khalid, Farooq Leghari and Sheikh Rahsid. On 17 August 1988, the day Zia ul Haq died, Jehangir was with Shaheed Bibi sahiba at 70 Clifton attending the Parliamentary Board meeting.

Jehangir contested for NA 107 (NA138) on the PPP ticket in the 1988 elections, but was a victim of selective rigging as the establishment had decided to favour PML (N) in the Punjab, and could not let an unbending die-hard worker to be in the Assembly. From 1989 to 1996 he served as the PPP General Secretary, Lahore Division. Following the exile of Shaheed Bibi in 1997, he was forced onto the sidelines.

Discussing the unidentified shaheeds of the Karsaz tragedy at Garhi Khuda Buksh in the presence of Mr. Nisar Khoro (Speaker Sindh Assembly) and Mr. Syed Qaim Ali Shah (Chief Minister of Sindh), was his idea, and which was highly appreciated and accepted by Bibi sahiba).

== Achievements ==
- Joined Zulfiqar Ali Bhutto as a Student Leader Forman Christian College University Lahore, When Zulfiqar Ali Bhutto 1st time came to His Residence in Kasur (August 1967).
- Joined Pakistan Peoples Party On its First Convention, as A founder Member (30 November 1967).
- Appointed President Pakistan Peoples Party City Kasur In 1969.
- Appointed 1st District President in 1976 on the formation of New District, Kasur.
- It was his struggle and hard work which ended with a new district and the district headquarters become the City Kasur.
- Member Provisional Assembly Punjab (P.P 148) in 1977.
- Begam Nusrat Bhutto Initiated 1st Martial Law open violation campaign from His house in 1978.
- Benazir Bhutto Visited His house in 1979.
- Became a member of the Punjab Council in 1983.
- Appointed as a Member of the Central Parliamentary Board in 1988.
- Awarded National Assembly Ticket from (NA- 107) In 1988.
- Appointed as General Secretary, Lahore Division from 1989 to 1996.

Government offices
Preceded by	Member of 8th Provincial Assembly of the Punjab; 9 April 1977 to 5 July 1977	Succeeded by
