= Kasur Museum =

- قصور عجائب گھر
- Established: 1999
- Location: Kasur District, Punjab, Pakistan
- Coordinates: 31°06′46″N 74°28′00″E
- Type: Cultural heritage museum
- Collections: Archaeology, coins, Islamic artifacts, Pakistan Movement, Kasur crafts

Kasur Museum (Urdu: قصور عجائب گھر) is a cultural heritage museum established in 1999, located in Kasur District, Punjab, Pakistan.

== Galleries ==
The museum consists of five galleries: Archaeology Gallery, Coin Gallery, Islamic Gallery, Tehreek-e-Pakistan Gallery and Kasur Craft Gallery.
