= Kamber Ali Khan =

Kamber Ali Khan قمبر علی خان
- City
- Location within Sindh Location within Pakistan
- Coordinates: 27.58684°N 68.00187°E
- Country: Pakistan
- Province: Sindh

Government
  - Type: Municipal Committee
  - Chairman: Rehan Ali
  - Vice Chairman: Noor Ahmed

Area
  - City: 15 km^{2} (5.8 sq mi)
- Elevation: 76 m (249 ft)

Population (2023 census)
  - City: 112,313
  - Rank: 114th in Pakistan
  - Density: 7,500/km^{2} (19,000/sq mi)
- Time zone: UTC+5 (PST)

Qamber Ali Khan (Sindhi: قمبر علي خان; Urdu: قمبر علی خان) is a city in the north-west of the Sindh province of Pakistan. It is the 114th populous city of Pakistan, according to 2023 census.

== Geography ==
Qamber Ali Khan is situated in North-western Sindh and it owns talukas. It is also included in upper Sindh.

== Climate ==
Qamber Ali Khan is a monsoon climatic region. Summer is extremely hot as temperature reaches at 53 °C (127 °F) and winter is a little cool as temperature drops to 26 °C (79 °F). On May 26, 2010, the mercury recorded 53.4 °C (128.1 °F) becoming the hottest city in the country's history. On May 31, 1998 the mercury hit 52.7 °C (126.9 °F). On May 18, 2013, the temperature in the city remained at 50 °C (122 °F) in Qamber Ali Khan. This hot weather sometimes cost human lives. Hot days continue from May till September, followed by Monsoon Rains, sometime bringing floods in the nearby areas. Monsoon season starts from July and continues till September and brings Torrential Rains. Pre-Monsoon also occurs occasionally in the month of June while post-monsoon occurs rarely.

On July 8, 2003, Qamber experienced a cloudburst of 209 mm (8.2 in) in just 12 hours due to a well marked low pressure which came from Bay of Bengal. Thunderstorms are very common, they often develop in all months. Most dangerous thunderstorm occurred on April 21, 2012, it was a supercell thunderstorm which came from west side with heavy downpour due to strong Western Disturbance which was developed in Gulf of Oman.

Duststorms are also very common in summer and monsoon especially from March to September. On March 27, 2013 a duststorm came with the damaging winds of 90 km/h (56 mph) due to a severe thunderstorm and it brought some rainfall also. Hailstorms are unusual and occur mainly from February to April. Qamber Ali Khan experienced a powerful hailstorm in April 2006 and again on 14 March 2015 followed by heavy downpour.

In 2012, Qamber Ali Khan faced heavy downpours of 236 mm (9.3 in) from 5–10 September which flooded the whole city. Same as in August 2011 also, the city received intermittent heavy Rains from 25 to 31 August and again in September 2011 with time to time. In Monsoon of 1994 the city received 510 mm (20 in) of rainfall as most powerful low pressures hit Sindh which is the highest rainfall recorded in past 25 years.

== Demographics ==
=== Population ===
Historical population
Year	Pop.	±%
1951	9,100	—
1961	12,090	+32.9%
1972	18,476	+52.8%
1981	25,885	+40.1%
1998	58,369	+125.5%
2017	101,474	+73.8%
2023	112,313	+10.7%

According to 2023 census, Kamber Ali Khan had a population of 112,313.

=== Languages ===
Languages of Kambar Ali Khan MC (2023 Census)
1. Sindhi (99.7%)
2. Others (0.30%)

The majority of the population in the city of Qambar Ali Khan speaks the Sindhi language. Pashto and Brahui are spoken by a smaller number of people.

=== Religions ===
Religions in Kamber Ali Khan
Religions	Percent
Islam	98.0%
Others	2.0%

== Education ==
Several old and new schools, colleges are functioning in the city for both boys and girls. Many are private and public institutions.

=== Schools and Colleges ===
Some schools such as Government Higher Secondary School, Girls High School, Public School Kamber and Government Degree College.
