= Kasur =

Kasur قصور Qasūr
- City
- Kasur Museum on the Lahore–Kasur Road

- Municipal Committee Emblem

- Location within Punjab, Pakistan Location within Pakistan
- Coordinates: 31°7′0″N 74°27′0″E
- Country: Pakistan
- Province: (Punjab, Pakistan) Punjab
- Division: Lahore
- District: Kasur
- Founder: Kheshgi dynasty

Government
  - Type: Municipal Corporation
  - Mayor: Vacant
  - Deputy Mayor: Vacant
  - Deputy Commissioner: Muhammad Asif Raza (PAS)
- Elevation: 218 m (715 ft)

Population (2023)
  - City: 510,875
  - Rank: 22nd, Pakistan
- Demonym: Kasuri
- Time zone: UTC+5 (PST)
- Calling code: 049
- Website: kasur.punjab.gov.pk

Kasur (Punjabi / Urdu: قصور; Punjabi pronunciation: [ˈkɐsuːɾᵊ]; Urdu pronunciation: [ˈqəsuːɾ] also romanized as Qasūr; from pluralized Arabic word Qasr meaning "palaces" or "forts") is a city to the south of Lahore, in the Pakistani province of Punjab. The city serves as the headquarters of Kasur District. Kasur is the 16th largest city in Punjab and 24th largest in Pakistan, by population. It is also known for being the burial place of the 17th-century Sufi-poet Bulleh Shah. It is near the border with India, and borders the Lahore, Sheikhupura and Okara Districts of Punjab. The city is an aggregation of 26 fortified hamlets overlooking the alluvial valleys of the Beas and Sutlej rivers.

== Etymology ==
Kasur derives its name from the Arabic and Persian word qasur (قصور), meaning "palaces," or "forts." According to a legend, Kasur was founded by, and named for, Prince Kusha of the Ramayana, son of the Hindu deities Rama and Sita. According to that account, the city was named Kashawar along with its neighbouring city, Lahore which was named Lahawar. Historical records reject an ancient founding of the city and date it to 1525, when it was found as a fortified settlement.

== History ==
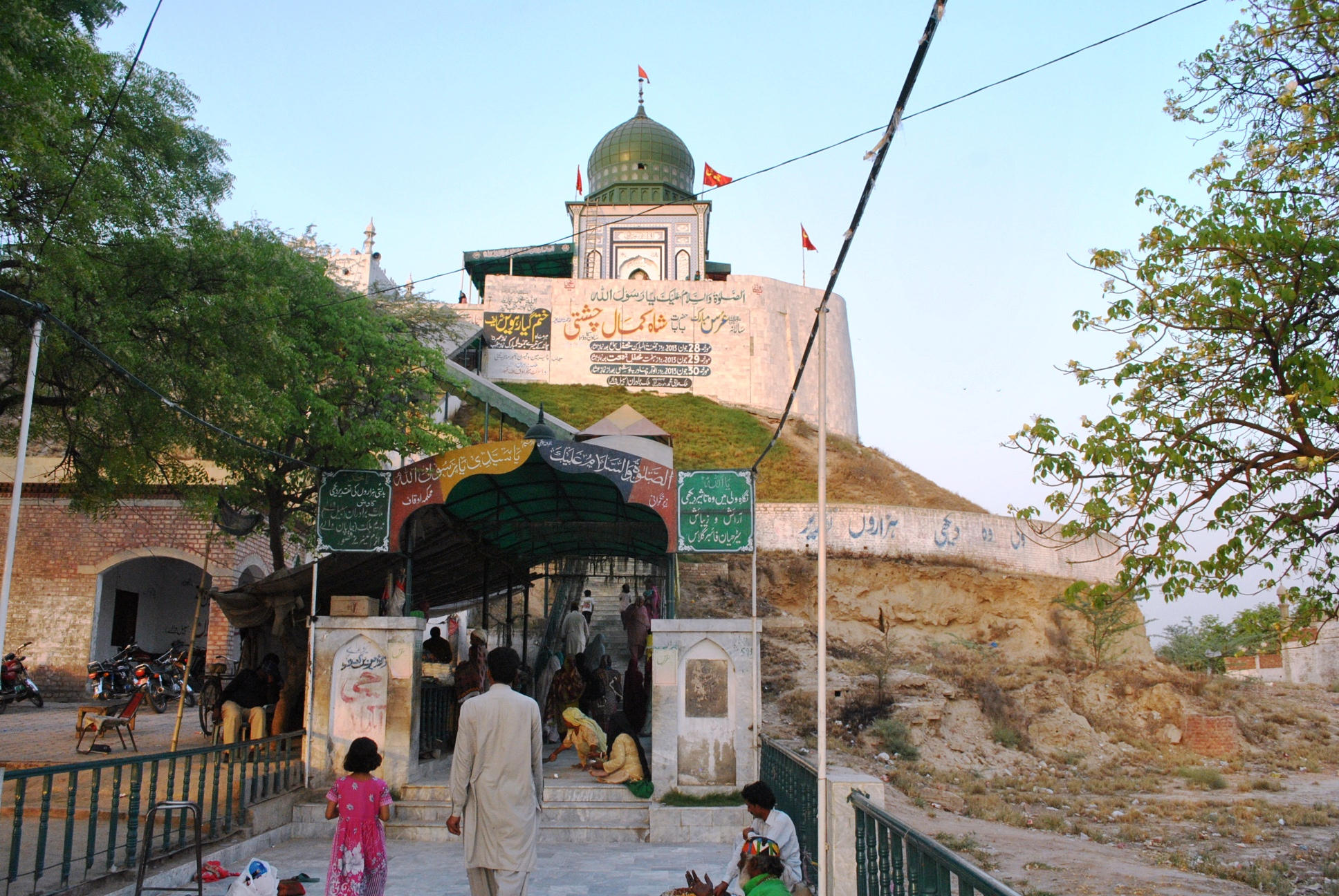
The hilltop shrine of Shah Kamal Chisti is a popular shrine in Kasur.

=== Early ===
The Kasur region was an agricultural region with forests during the Indus Valley civilization. The Kasur region was ruled variously by the Maurya Empire, Indo-Greek kingdom, Kushan Empire, Gupta Empire, White Huns, Kushano-Hephthalites and Kabul Shahi kingdoms. The region is also said to have been visited by the Chinese pilgrim Xuanzang in 633 AD. Alexander Cunningham writes about his visit describing the place filled with tombs, mosques, and thickly covered with ruins. The city which is most commonly associated with Kasur was described as being situated somewhere on the right bank of the Beas (Sutlej) opposite to the city of Lahore.

=== Arrival of Islam ===
==== Ghaznavids ====
In 1005 CE, Sultan Mahmud of Ghazni, took over the region under the Ghaznavid dynasty. This led to the introduction of Islam in the Northern Punjab area, after being conquered. Sufi missionaries were sent to the region in order to preach Islam which made the Punjab region predominantly Muslim. The city was later under the rule of the Delhi Sultanate and the Mughals.

==== Kheshgi Dynasty ====
Kasur was established as a city by the Kheshgi tribe of Pashtuns from Kabul who had migrated to the region in 1525 from Afghanistan during the reign of Babur and built several small forts in the area, establishing the Kheshgi chieftaincy. The city was built as an aggregation of about twelve fortified hamlets, known as kots (کوٹ) forming a considerable town. The 12 mahallahs (abodes) were built by the order of the Mughal Emperor Akbar, and named after the heads of various Pashtun families. Some of these forts have been severely damaged over time.

Under Mughal rule, the city flourished and was notable for commerce and trade. It became the home of the Sufi saint and poet, Bulleh Shah, who is buried in a large shrine in the city. After the decline of the Mughal Empire, the Kasur region fell into a power vacuum. Kasur was captured by Ahmad Shah Durrani of the Durrani Empire.

=== Sikh ===
The Sikhs sacked the city in 1747 under Jassa Singh Ahluwalia, and again in 1763 after Durrani shifted to Afghanistan. The Sikh Empire under Ranjit Singh, captured the city in 1807 in the Battle of Kasur. During the First Anglo-Sikh War, the city was occupied by Company forces on 10 February 1846.

=== British ===
During the British Raj, the irrigation canals were built that irrigated large areas of the Kasur District. Communal disturbances between Sikhs, Hindus, and Muslims erupted in 1908 over the issue of meat sales. Riots erupted following the Jallianwala Bagh massacre on 13 April 1919, leading to the destruction of civic infrastructure, including the city's railway station. Martial law was imposed on 16 April 1919 in response to the riots.

=== Modern ===
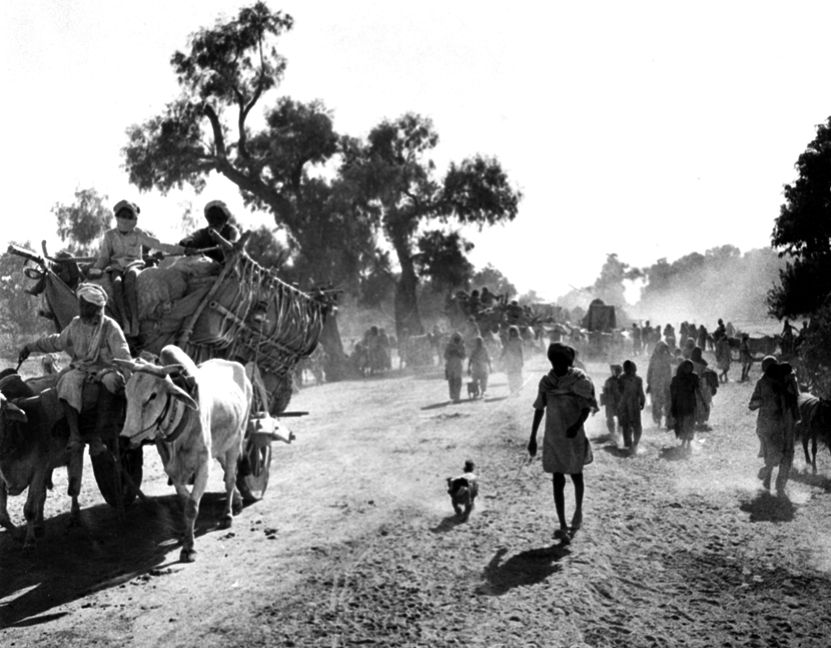
Refugees at Balloki, Kasur during the Partition of British India in 1947

After the formation of Pakistan in 1947, the minority Hindus and Sikhs migrated to India, while Muslim refugees migrated from India and settled in Kasur. Kasur emerged as a major centre of leather tanning after independence, and is home to 1/3rd of Pakistan's tanning industry.

Kasur is one of the biggest market and trading hub in the country of hides collection and leather tanning and processing. In recent times, hide traders in Kasur were engaged in smuggling donkey hides, a medicinal demand, to China via Karachi Port.

In January 2018, two protestors were killed in rioting over the rape and murder of Zainab Ansari, a seven-year-old girl. There had been 12 similar murders in the past two years, five of which have been linked to one suspect, leading to widespread anger at police failures.

In November 2020, Russia sponsored a 1,122-km high pressure RLNG pipeline from Port Qasim, Karachi to Kasur. In May 2021, Islamabad and Moscow agreed to change the name of the North-South Gas Pipeline Project to "Pakistan Stream Gas Pipeline".

== Geography ==
Kasur is bordered to the north by Lahore, by India to the south and east, it also has borders with Okara and Nankana Sahab district. The city is adjacent to the border of Ganda Singh Wala, a border with its own flag-lowering ceremony.

=== Ecoregion ===
Kasur is situated in a subtropical thorn woodland biome (Northwestern thorn scrub forests) and in the Deserts and xeric shrublands ecoregion according to the World Wide Fund for Nature's map of ecological regions in the world.

=== Climate ===
Kasur has a sub humid subtropical climate (Trewartha climate classification Cf), bordering a humid subtropical climate (Koppen: Cwa)in north(Lahore)and a Semi-arid climate in south (Okara). Kasur has extremes of climate; the summer season begins from May and continues till August. June is the hottest month. The mean maximum and minimum temperature for this month are about 42 °C (107.6 °F) and 27 °C (80.6 °F) respectively. The winter seasons lasts from November to February. January is the coldest month. The mean maximum and minimum temperatures for the coldest month are 22 °C (71.6 °F) and 4 °C (39.2 °F) respectively. With rainfall towards the end of June, monsoon conditions appear and during the following two and a half months the rainy season alternates with sultry weather. The winter rain falls during January, February and March, ranging from 23 millimetres (0.91 in) to 31 millimetres (1.2 in).According to a 30 year average from Pakistan Meteorological Department Kasur receives an annual of 700 to 850mm rainfall with 47 percent falling in monsoon season and rest falling outside monsoon season. Water logging tannery pollution and salinity have affected a large area of the district, making the underground water brackish and contaminated with heavy metals.

Climate data for Kasur, Pakistan
Month	Jan	Feb	Mar	Apr	May	Jun	Jul	Aug	Sep	Oct	Nov	Dec	Year
Record high °C (°F)	27.0 (80.6)	31.0 (87.8)	37.0 (98.6)	43.0 (109.4)	47.0 (116.6)	48.0 (118.4)	42.0 (107.6)	39.0 (102.2)	39.0 (102.2)	37.0 (98.6)	38.0 (100.4)	29.0 (84.2)	48.0 (118.4)
Mean daily maximum °C (°F)	21.0 (69.8)	22.0 (71.6)	28.0 (82.4)	35.0 (95.0)	39.0 (102.2)	39.0 (102.2)	36.0 (96.8)	35.0 (95.0)	35.0 (95.0)	32.0 (89.6)	27.0 (80.6)	22.0 (71.6)	30.9 (87.6)
Daily mean °C (°F)	14 (57)	19 (66)	19 (66)	24 (75)	27 (81)	27.5 (81.5)	27 (81)	26.5 (79.7)	25.6 (78.1)	24 (75)	20 (68)	18 (64)	22.6 (72.7)
Mean daily minimum °C (°F)	6.0 (42.8)	10.0 (50.0)	14.0 (57.2)	20.0 (68.0)	24.0 (75.2)	25.0 (77.0)	24.5 (76.1)	24.0 (75.2)	21.0 (69.8)	18.3 (64.9)	12.0 (53.6)	6.6 (43.9)	17.1 (62.8)
Record low °C (°F)	−2.0 (28.4)	2.0 (35.6)	6.0 (42.8)	9.0 (48.2)	13.0 (55.4)	13.0 (55.4)	13.0 (55.4)	13.0 (55.4)	10.0 (50.0)	6.0 (42.8)	3.0 (37.4)	−1.0 (30.2)	−2.0 (28.4)
Average precipitation mm (inches)	20 (0.8)	13 (0.5)	21 (0.8)	43 (1.7)	99 (3.9)	177 (7.0)	149 (5.9)	86 (3.4)	41 (1.6)	11 (0.4)	9 (0.4)	10 (0.4)	679 (26.8)
Mean monthly sunshine hours	279	252	341	360	403	390	341	310	330	341	300	310	3,957
Source 1: MyWeather2
Source 2: Weather Spark

== Demographics ==
Population

Historical population

Year	Pop.	±% p.a.
1972	101,295	—
1981	155,523	+4.88%
1998	245,321	+2.72%

Year	Pop.	±% p.a.
2017	358,409	+2.02%
2023	510,875	+6.09%

The population of Kasur is 510,875 as of 2023. The principal tribes residing here include the Rajput, Jats, Arains, Dogars, Ansari, Sheikh, Pashtuns etc. Among them there are also a concentration of Kashmiris who had migrated earlier, during partition. There are also Moeens or artisans; they include Christians, blacksmiths (Lohar), carpenters (Tarkhan), ceramicists (Kumhar), barbers, weavers etc.

=== Religion ===
The population in Kasur is predominantly Muslim with some small Christian and Hindu minorities. In a census conducted by the Office of the Census Commissioner in 1951, the result was that 96% of the population of Kasur was Muslim with 0.004% being Hindu minorities and 0.034% being Christian minorities.

Religious groups in Kasur City (1881−2017) (Note: 1881-1941: Data for the entirety of the town of Kasur, which included Kasur Municipality.)
Religious group	1881		1891		1901		1911		1921		1931		1941		2017	
Religious group	Pop.	%	Pop.	%	Pop.	%	Pop.	%	Pop.	%	Pop.	%	Pop.	%	Pop.	%
Islam	13,852	79.9%	15,406	75.93%	16,257	73.82%	18,588	75%	22,290	71.86%	36,658	78.3%	39,295	74%	469,635	96.12%
Hinduism	3,074	17.73%	4,413	21.75%	5,327	24.19%	5,291	21.35%	7,333	23.64%	8,251 (Note: 1931-1941: Including Ad-Dharmis)	17.62%	10,752	20.25%	13	0%
Sikhism	242	1.4%	382	1.88%	295	1.34%	631	2.55%	987	3.18%	1,529	3.27%	2,034	3.83%	—N/a	—N/a
Jainism	168	0.97%	89	0.44%	97	0.44%	169	0.68%	265	0.85%	144	0.31%	452	0.85%	—N/a	—N/a
Christianity	—N/a	—N/a	0	0%	43	0.2%	101	0.41%	141	0.45%	227	0.48%	562	1.06%	18,719	3.83%
Zoroastrianism	—N/a	—N/a	0	0%	3	0.01%	3	0.01%	2	0.01%	6	0.01%	—N/a	—N/a	—N/a	—N/a
Ahmadiyya	—N/a	—N/a	—N/a	—N/a	—N/a	—N/a	—N/a	—N/a	—N/a	—N/a	—N/a	—N/a	—N/a	—N/a	212	0.04%
Others	0	0%	0	0%	0	0%	0	0%	0	0%	0	0%	6	0.01%	0	0%
Total population	17,336	100%	20,290	100%	22,022	100%	24,783	100%	31,018	100%	46,815	100%	53,101	100%	488,579	100%

=== Languages ===
Languages of Urban Kasur Tehsil (2023)
1. Punjabi (88.6%)
2. Urdu (6.10%)
3. Mewati (4.65%)
4. Others (0.61%)

According to the 2023 Census of Pakistan, Kasur is overwhelmingly Punjabi-speaking. Punjabi is the dominant language, spoken by 88.64% of the population. This is followed by Urdu, spoken by 6.10%, and Mewati, which accounts for a significant minority at 4.65%, and an additional 0.61% of the population spoke other languages of Pakistan (mostly Pashto and Sindhi). (Note: Data taken from the urban part of Kasur Tehsil, which includes Kasur MC and Mustafabad MC)

== Notable people ==
- Ram Nath Chawla, Indian Pilot
- Bawa Lal Dayal, 14th-century saint
- Irshad Ahmed Haqqani, journalist, writer
- Noor Jehan, singer and actress
- Ahmed Khan Kasuri, Pakistani Magistrate, allegedly assassinated by Zulfiqar Ali Bhutto
- Ahmad Raza Khan Kasuri, former member of National Assembly of Pakistan
- Fauzia Kasuri, a Pakistani politician and women's activist
- Khurshid Mahmud Kasuri, former Foreign Minister
- Mahmud Ali Kasuri, a Pakistani politician, lawyer and human rights activist, former Law Minister
- Bade Ghulam Ali Khan, classical vocalist of British India
- Barkat Ali Khan, classical vocalist of British India
- Muhammad Muhsin Khan, Muslim scholar and author
- Rana Muhammad Iqbal Khan former speaker Punjab assembly
- Yousuf Khan, actor
- Hafiz Ghulam Murtaza, spiritual murshid of Bulleh Shah and Waris Shah
- Sardar Asif Nakai, Member of the Punjab Provincial Assembly
- Sardar Talib Hassan Nakai, Member of National Assembly of Pakistan
- Najam Sethi, journalist, writer, Pakistan Cricket Board chairman
- Bulleh Shah, Sufi saint and spiritual poet
- Pran Kumar Sharma, Indian cartoonist
- Basit Jehangir Sheikh, Politician, youngest founder member of the Pakistan Peoples Party (P.P.P)
- Fateh Muhammad Sial, first Ahmadi missionary sent from India

== See also ==
- Alahabad
- Mustafaabad
