= Dullewala =

Dullewala دُلّے والا
- Town
- Map of Punjab, Pakistan Dullewala دُلّے والا (Pakistan)
- Coordinates: 31°50′23″N 71°25′48″E
- Country: Pakistan
- Province: (Punjab, Pakistan) Punjab
- District: Bhakkar
- Tehsil: Darya Khan
- Union Council: Dullewala
- Headquarters: Dullewala

Government
  - constituency of Nation/Punjab Assembly: NA91, PP90

Population (2024)
  - Total: 54,277
- Time zone: UTC+05:00 (Pakistan Standard Time)
- Postal Code: 30110
- Calling code: 0453
- Union council: 02

Dullewala (Urdu: دُلّے والا) is a town in the Bhakkar District in Punjab, Pakistan.

The town has a population of 54,277 inhabitants. It is located roughly 155 mi (or 249 km) south-west of Islamabad, the national capital.

Some of the schools here are:

- Pakistan Public School and College Dullewala
- Kings Castle School
- Ghazi Education System
- Al Qalam Public School and College
- Al Syed Model Public School Dullewala

The common castes of the town are: Teli Malik, Jhammat, Rawn, Miana, Gazar, Mughal, Baloch, Malik, Haindan, Maachhi, Bhatti, Qazi, Arain, Chheena, Awan, Saandi, Bihari, Ghoka, Chohan, Khan, Niazi, Bheen, Shahi, Ghallu, Darkhan, Lohar, Alizai, Khokhar, Jutt, Joiya, Naai, Mochi, Dharhal, Janjar, Khodi, Chundi, Shah Syed, Wains, Gudara, Kumhar, Kallu, Kalyar, Tarair, Dogar, Gari, Pathan, Langah, Sailu, Choudhary, Jaura.
