= Mohammad Akram (Lahore Division cricketer) =

Pakistani cricketer

Personal information
- Full name: Mohammad Akram
- Born: 11 May 1964 (age 62); Kasur, Punjab, Pakistan
- Batting: Right-handed
- Role: Batsman, occasional wicket-keeper

Domestic team information
- Years: Team
- 1984–1985: Lahore Division

Career statistics
Competition	FC
Matches	4
Runs scored	129
Batting average	16.12
100s/50s	0/0
Top score	33
Catches/stumpings	2/-
- Source: CricketArchive, 3 March 2013

Mohammad Akram (born 11 May 1964) is a former Pakistani cricketer. From Kasur, Punjab, all of Mohammad's first-class matches were played for Lahore Division, during the 1984–85 and 1985–86 seasons of the BCCP Patron's Trophy. An opening batsman, he made his debut for the team against Gujranwala in October 1984, opening with Amjad Ali in the first innings and Zahid Shah in the second innings. Although usually playing as a wicket-keeper in lower levels, Mohammad only kept wicket once in first-class matches, against Lahore City Whites in November 1985. He finished his career with 129 runs from four matches, with his highest score an innings of 33 runs against Lahore City Blues.
