= Jand =

Jand may refer to:

== Places ==
- Jand, Attock, a town in Jand Tehsil, Attock District, Punjab, Pakistan
- Jand, Chakwal, a village and union council in Chakwal District, Punjab, Pakistan
- Jand, Jalandhar, a village in Punjab, India
- Jánd, a village in eastern Hungary
- Jand (Transoxania), a medieval town in Central Asia

== Other uses ==
- Prosopis cineraria (Punjabi: jand), a species of flowering tree
