= Government Graduate College Shakargarh =

- Government College Shakargarh
- Motto: Courage and Knowledge
- Type: Public educational institute
- Established: 1964
- Affiliations: Gujranwala Board and Punjab University
- Students: 2800
- Location: Shakargarh, Pakistan
- Website: www.gcskg.edu.pk

Government Graduate College Shakargarh is an educational institution in Shakargarh in Punjab, Pakistan. It was established in 1964 and offers courses in mathematics, sciences, language, computer science, languages, history, religion and philosophy.
