= Shehr Sultan =

- City
- Location within Punjab, Pakistan Location within Pakistan Location within South Asia
- Coordinates: 29.576619°N 71.018977°E
- Country: Pakistan
- Province: Punjab
- Division: Dera Ghazi Khan
- District: Muzaffargarh

Population (2023 census)
  - Total: 62,184
- Time zone: UTC+5 (PST)
  - Summer (DST): UTC+6 (PDT)

Shehr Sultan (Urdu: شہر سلطان) is a city in the province of Punjab, Pakistan.

== Demographics ==
Population

Historical population
Year	Pop.	±%
1972	5,029	—
1981	8,650	+72.0%
1998	13,788	+59.4%
2017	49,844	+261.5%
2023	62,184	+24.8%

According to the 2023 census, Shehr Sultan had a population of 62,184.

Languages

Languages of Shehr Sultan (2023 Census)
1. Saraiki (86.8%)
2. Urdu (11.5%)
3. Punjabi (1.00%)
4. Others (0.70%)
