= List of cities in Gilgit-Baltistan by population =

This is a list showing the most populous cities in Gilgit-Baltistan, Pakistan. Gilgit-Baltistan is predominantly a rural region, with only about 16.5% (246,332 people) of population being urban as of 2017, mainly based in the divisional capitals of Gilgit, Skardu and Chilas.

== List ==
City	District	Pop. (estimate)	Pop. (1998)
Gilgit	Gilgit	250,000 (2025)	56,701
Skardu	Skardu	112,996 (2021)	26,023
Chilas	Diamer	100,000 (2026)	16,575
Khaplu	Ghanche	...	12,883
Gahkuch	Ghizer	...	10,142

== See also ==
- List of cities in Pakistan by population
  - List of cities in Azad Kashmir by population
  - List of cities in Punjab, Pakistan by population
  - List of cities in Khyber Pakhtunkhwa by population
  - List of cities in Balochistan by population
  - List of cities in Sindh by population
- List of metropolitan areas in Pakistan
