= Khushal Khan Khattak Express =

Pakistani train service

Khushal Khan Khattak Express is a train service between Karachi City and Peshawar in Pakistan. It takes 37 hrs 30 minutes to cover approximately 1,764 kilometres (1,096 mi). This train follows the Karachi–Peshawar Line from Peshawar Cantt to Attock City Junction, Kotri-Attock Line between Attock City and Kotri Junction and gets back on Karachi–Peshawar Line between Kotri Junction and Karachi City. Important Stations covered by this train include Nowshera, Attock City, Basal, Daud Khel, Mianwali, Kundian, Bhakkar, Laiyyah, Kot Addu, Dera Ghazi Khan, Kashmor, Kandhkot, Rajanpur, Jacobababad, Shikarpur, Habib Kot, Larkana, Dadu, Sehwan Sharif, Kotri, Landhi and Karachi Cantt. This is the only train in Pakistan Railways that has 3 loco reversals along its journey at Attock City Junction, Kot Addu and Jacobabad Junction.
