= Raja Jang =

- Town
- Location within Pakistan
- Coordinates: 30°56′56″N 73°44′36″E
- Country: Pakistan
- Province: Punjab
- District: Kasur
- Elevation: 186 m (610 ft)

Population (2023)
  - Total: 66,404
- Time zone: UTC+5 (PST)

Raja Jang (Urdu: راجہ جنگ), is a town and Municipal Corporation of Kasur District in the Punjab province of Pakistan. It is part of Kasur Tehsil. Its population is over 66,404. It is situated at a higher altitude than Lahore. The BRB Canal passes the north-west side of the town.

== History ==
The name Raja Jang is a variation of Raja Roy Bahadur Jang. Raja Roy Bahadur Jang lived in Raja Jang under British rule. After 1947, Sikhs and Hindus left behind havelis and mansions. Raja Jang is the only town of Kasur district with high literacy.

== Demographics ==
Population

Historical population
Year	Pop.	±%
1972	13,590	—
1981	15,638	+15.1%
1998	20,943	+33.9%
2017	30,855	+47.3%
2023	66,404	+115.2%

According to official 2023 census results, the population of Raja Jang city is 66,404.

== Festivals ==
The main festivals are the Urs of Baba Masoom Shah, Baba Fateh Shah, Baba Khaki shah, and Baba Lal Shahbaz. The Muslim population shows great interest in celebrating Eid UL Fitr, Eid UL Azha.

== Sports ==
Rassa Kashi (Tug of war) is the major sports item. H/S Raja Jang was the divisional champion of Rassa Kashi until the 1990s. Raja Jang has many teams playing football and cricket, which hold local sports competitions annually. Hockey is popular.
