= Jand, Jalandhar =

Jand
- Village
- Location in Punjab, India Jand (India)
- Coordinates: 31.1069664°N 75.7560474°E
- Country: India
- State: Punjab
- District: Jalandhar

Government
  - Type: Panchayat raj
  - Body: Gram panchayat
- Elevation: 240 m (790 ft)

Population (2011)
  - Total: 477
- Sex ratio 234/243 ♂/♀

Languages
  - Official: Punjabi
- Time zone: UTC+5:30 (IST)
- PIN: 144409
- Telephone: 01824
- ISO 3166 code: IN-PB
- Vehicle registration: PB- 08
- Post office: Goraya
- Website: jalandhar.nic.in

Jand is a village in Jalandhar district of Punjab State, India. It is located 3.2 km away from postal head office in Goraya, 13 km from Phillaur, 36.6 km from district headquarter Jalandhar and 122 km from state capital Chandigarh. The village is administrated by a sarpanch, who is an elected representative.

== Education ==
The village has a Punjabi medium, co-ed primary school (PRI Jand). The school provide mid-day meal as per Indian Midday Meal Scheme and the meal prepared in school premises and it was found in 1975.

== Demography ==
According to the report published by Census India in 2011, Jand has a total number of 92 houses and population of 477 of which include 234 males and 243 females. Literacy rate of Jand is 77.59%, higher than state average of 75.84%. The population of children under the age of 6 years is 62 which is 13% of total population of Jand, and child sex ratio is approximately 1214 higher than state average of 846.

Most of the people are from Schedule Caste which constitutes 77.15% of total population in Jand. The town does not have any Schedule Tribe population so far.

As per census 2011, 241 people were engaged in work activities out of the total population of Jand which includes 152 males and 89 females. According to census survey report 2011, 70.95% workers describe their work as main work and 29.05% workers are involved in marginal activity providing livelihood for less than 6 months.

== Transport ==
Goraya railway station is the nearest train station; however, Phillaur Junction train station is 12 km away from the village. The village is 41.9 km away from domestic airport in Ludhiana and the nearest international airport is located in Chandigarh also Sri Guru Ram Dass Jee International Airport is the second nearest airport which is 131 km away in Amritsar.
