= Khurrianwala =

Town in Faisalabad District, Pakistan

- City
- Location within Punjab, Pakistan Location within Pakistan
- Coordinates: 31°31′2″N 73°16′0″E
- Country: Pakistan
- District: Faisalabad District
- Province: Punjab

Government
  - Type: Municipal Committee
- Elevation: 178 m (584 ft)

Population
  - City: 96,743
  - Rank: 134th in Pakistan
- Time zone: UTC+5
- Postal code: 37630
- Area code: 041

Khurrianwala (Urdu: كهُرڑيانوالہ), is a city near Faisalabad in Jaranwala Tehsil, Punjab, Pakistan. It is located on the Faisalabad to Lahore section of the Grand Trunk Road. The population, per the 2023 Pakistani census, survey is 96,743. The town's postal code is 37630.

Its inhabitants includes castes such as Jutt, Rajput, Arain and others.

== Economy ==
A large number of textile mills are located on the Faisalabad-Lahore Road which play an important role in the economy of Pakistan and are a large source of employment. Agriculture is also an important employment sector for the population of the villages near Khurrianwala.

== Demographics ==
Population

Historical population
Year	Pop.	±%
1998	30,012	—
2017	75,907	+152.9%
2023	96,743	+27.4%
