= List of cities in Azad Kashmir =

This is a list showing the most populous cities in the self-administrative territory of Pakistan–administered Azad Kashmir as of the 2017 Census of Pakistan. City populations found in this list only refer to populations found within the city's defined limits and any adjacent cantonments. The census totals below come from the Planning and Development Department of the Government of Azad Kashmir.

== List ==
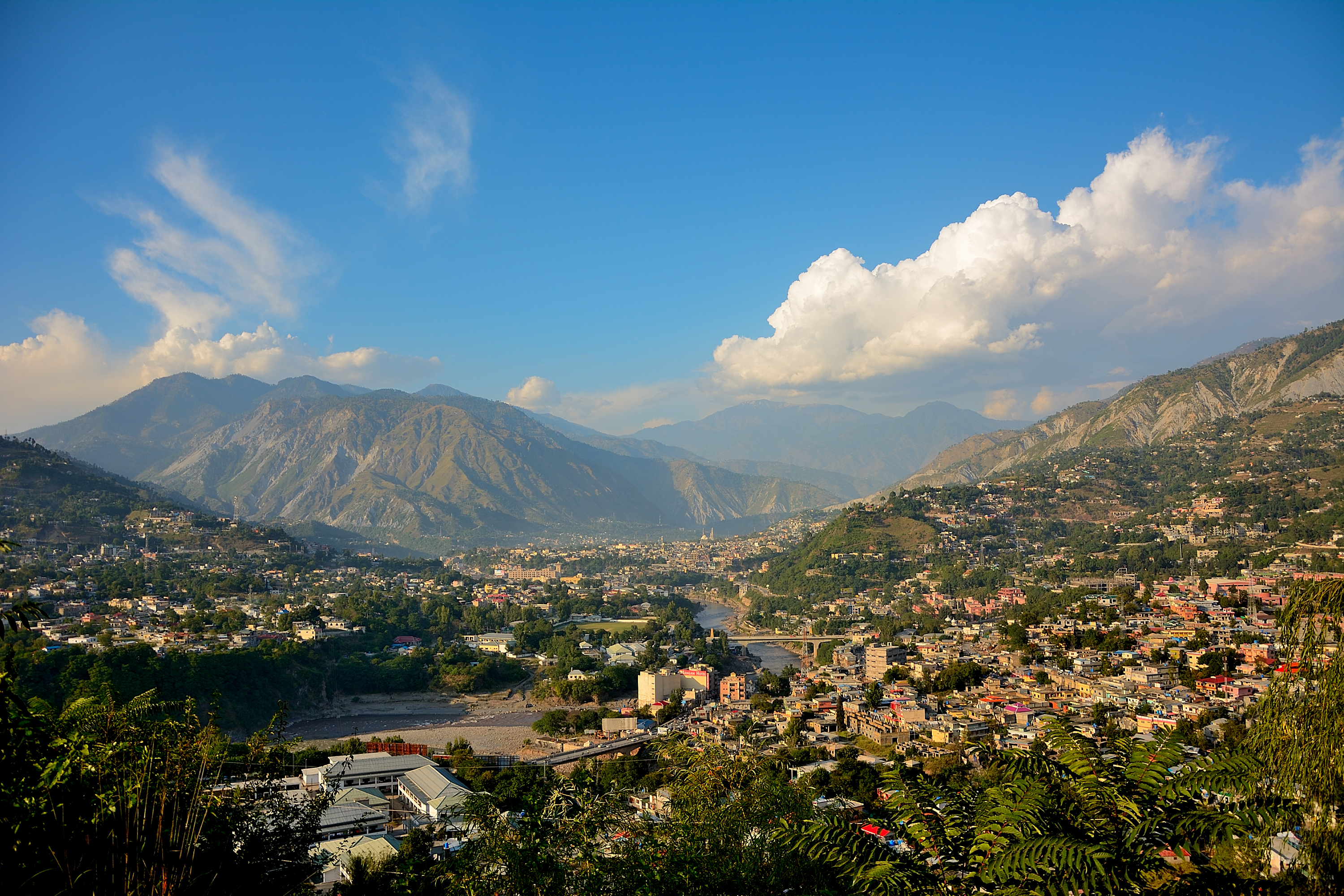
Muzaffarabad

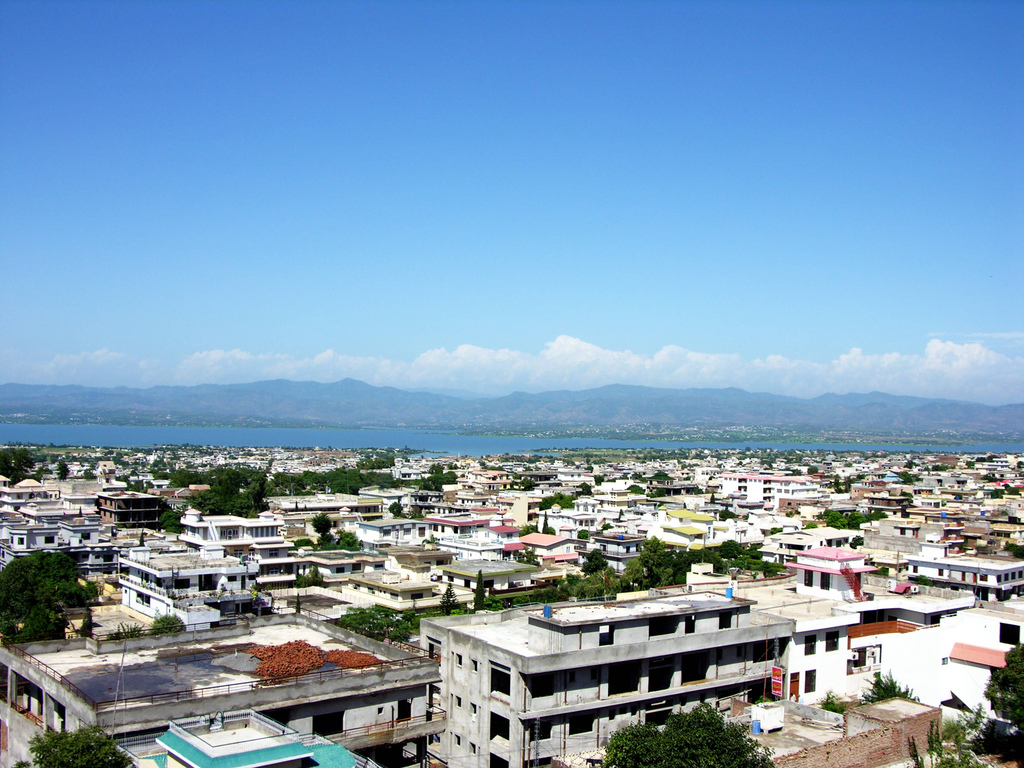
Mirpur

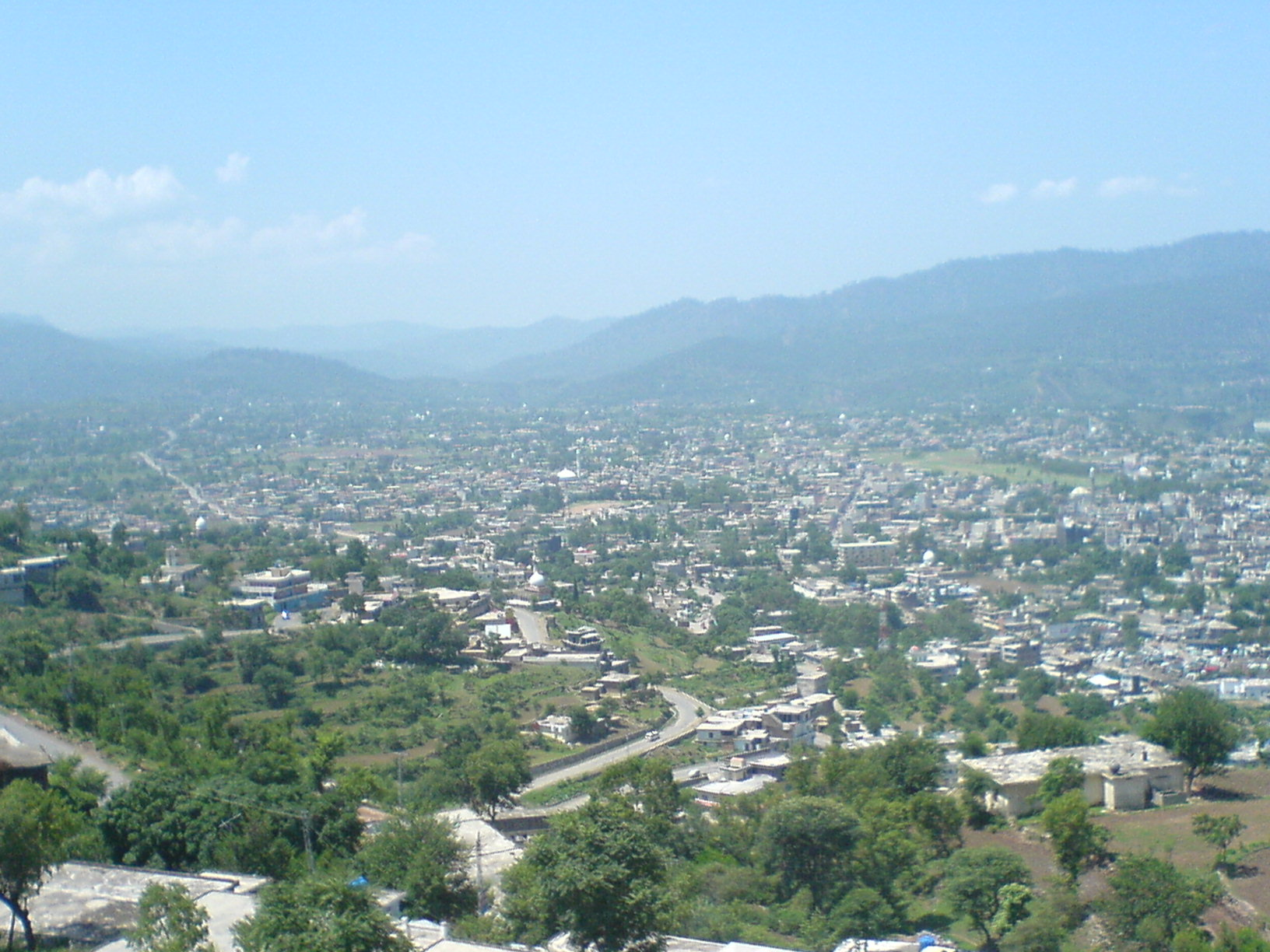
Kotli

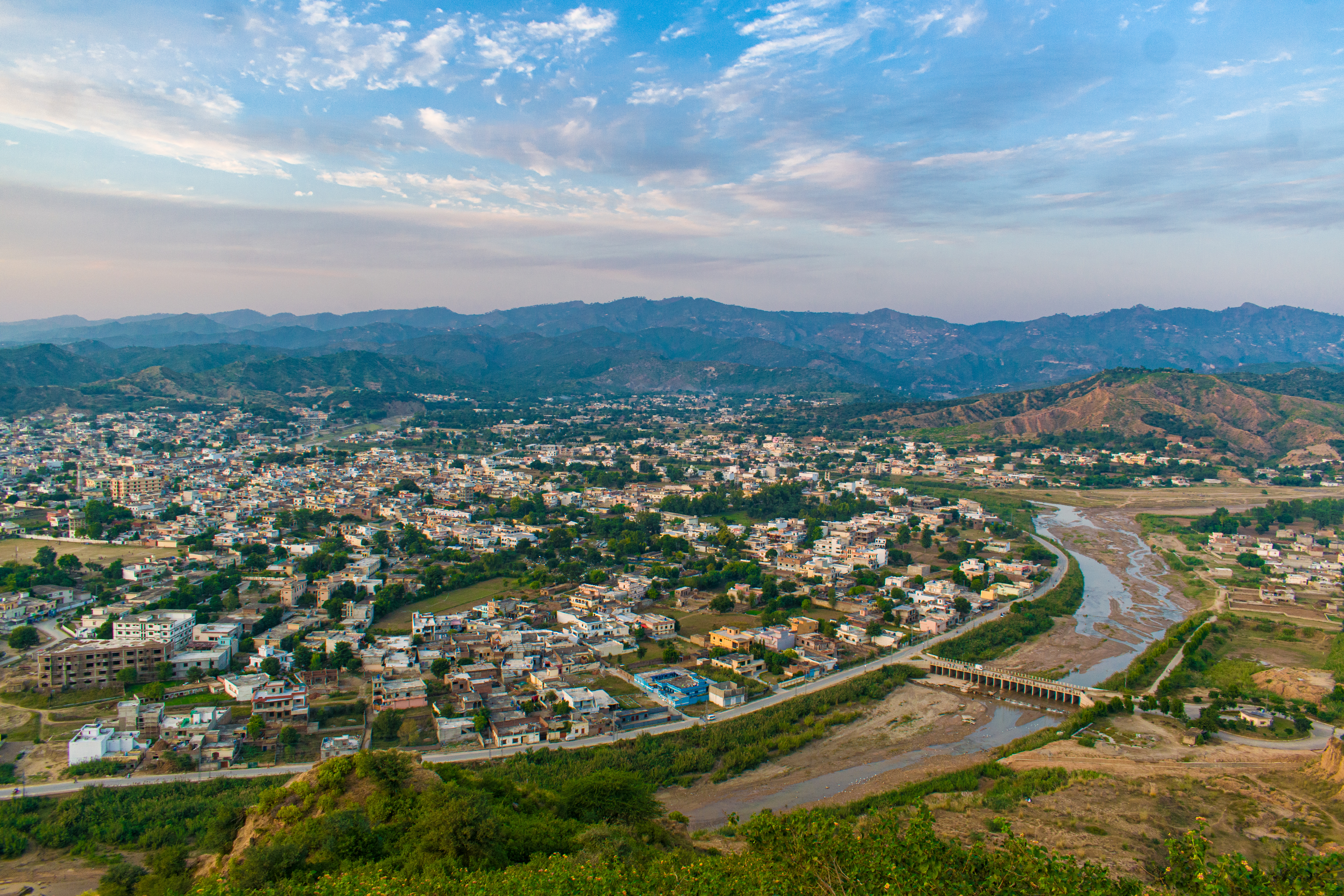
Bhimber

Rank	City	District	Population (2017)	Population (1998)
1	Muzaffarabad	Muzaffarabad	149,913	85,462
2	Mirpur	Mirpur	124,352	N/A
3	Rawalakot	Poonch	56,006	N/A
4	Kotli	Kotli	46,907	N/A
5	Dhirkot	Bagh	36,270	N/A
6	Bagh	Bagh	33,548	18,886
7	Hajira	Poonch	28,953	N/A
8	Bhimber	Bhimber	27,636	16,144
9	Palandri	Sudhanoti	23,243	16,406
10	Chakswari	Mirpur	21,123	N/A
11	Dadyal	Mirpur	19,290	N/A
12	Khai Gala	Poonch	19,119	N/A
13	Islamgarh	Mirpur	16,651	N/A
14	Pathika	Muzaffarabad	14,115	N/A
15	Hattian Bala	Hattian Bala	11,880	N/A
16	Sehnsa	Kotli	10,392	N/A
17	Abbaspur	Poonch	10,208	N/A
18	Khuiratta	Kotli	8,220	N/A
19	Garhi Dupatta	Muzaffarabad	7,931	N/A
20	Athmuqam	Neelum	7,922	5,723
21	Charhoi	Kotli	7,535	N/A
22	Fatehpur Thakiala	Kotli	6,188	N/A
23	Forward Kahuta	Haveli	5,555	N/A
24	Chikkar	Hattian Bala	5,196	N/A
25	Samahni	Bhimber	4,367	N/A

== See also ==
- List of cities in Pakistan by population
  - List of cities in Gilgit-Baltistan by population
  - List of cities in Khyber Pakhtunkhwa by population
  - List of cities in Sindh by population
  - List of cities in Punjab, Pakistan by population
  - List of cities in Balochistan, Pakistan by population
