= Ladhe Wala Waraich =

Ladhe Wala Waraich لدھیوالا وڑائچ
- City
- Location within Punjab, Pakistan Location within Pakistan
- Coordinates: 32.157755°N 74.115244°E
- Country: Pakistan
- Province: Punjab
- Division: Gujranwala
- District: Gujranwala

Government
  - Type: Municipal Committee
  - Chairman: Vacant
  - Vice Chairman: Vacant

Population (2023)
  - City: 100,331
  - Rank: 126th in Pakistan
- Time zone: UTC+5 (PST)

Ladhe Wala Waraich (Punjabi and Urdu: لدھیوالا وڑائچ), is a town in Gujranwala District in the Punjab province of Pakistan. The city is part of Gujranwala Saddar Tehsil. Ladhe Wala Waraich lies to the west of Gujranwala and is part of the larger metropolitan area.

== Demographics ==
Population of Ladhe Wala Waraich city.

Historical population
Year	Pop.	±%
1998	33,928	—
2017	92,020	+171.2%
2023	100,331	+9.0%

Languages

Languages of Ludhewala Waraich MC (2023 Census)
1. Punjabi (94.2%)
2. Urdu (5.20%)
3. Others (0.60%)
