= Dijkot =

Pakistani town

Dijkot ڈجکوٹ
- City
- Location of Dijkot Dijkot (Pakistan)
- Coordinates: 31°13′3″N 72°59′45″E
- Country: Pakistan
- Province: (Punjab, Pakistan) Punjab
- Division: Faisalabad
- District: Faisalabad District
- Elevation: 174 m (571 ft)

Population (2023 Census)
  - City: 96,934
  - Rank: 133rd in Pakistan

Languages
  - Official: Urdu
  - Native: Punjabi
- Time zone: UTC+5:00 (PKT)

Dijkot (Punjabi, Urdu: ڈجکوٹ) is a city in the Faisalabad District of Punjab, Pakistan.

== Demographics ==
Population

Historical population
Year	Pop.	±% p.a.
1998	23,126	—
2017	39,873	+2.91%
2023	96,934	+15.96%

Dijkot has a population of 96,934 (2023).

Languages

Languages of Dijkot MC (2023 Census)
1. Punjabi (98.4%)
2. Urdu (1.00%)
3. Others (1.60%)

== Geography ==
The area of Dijkot is 700 kanal, or .35 km^{2}. It is situated on the Faisalabad-Samundri Road 26 km from Faisalabad and 20 km from Samundri.

== History ==
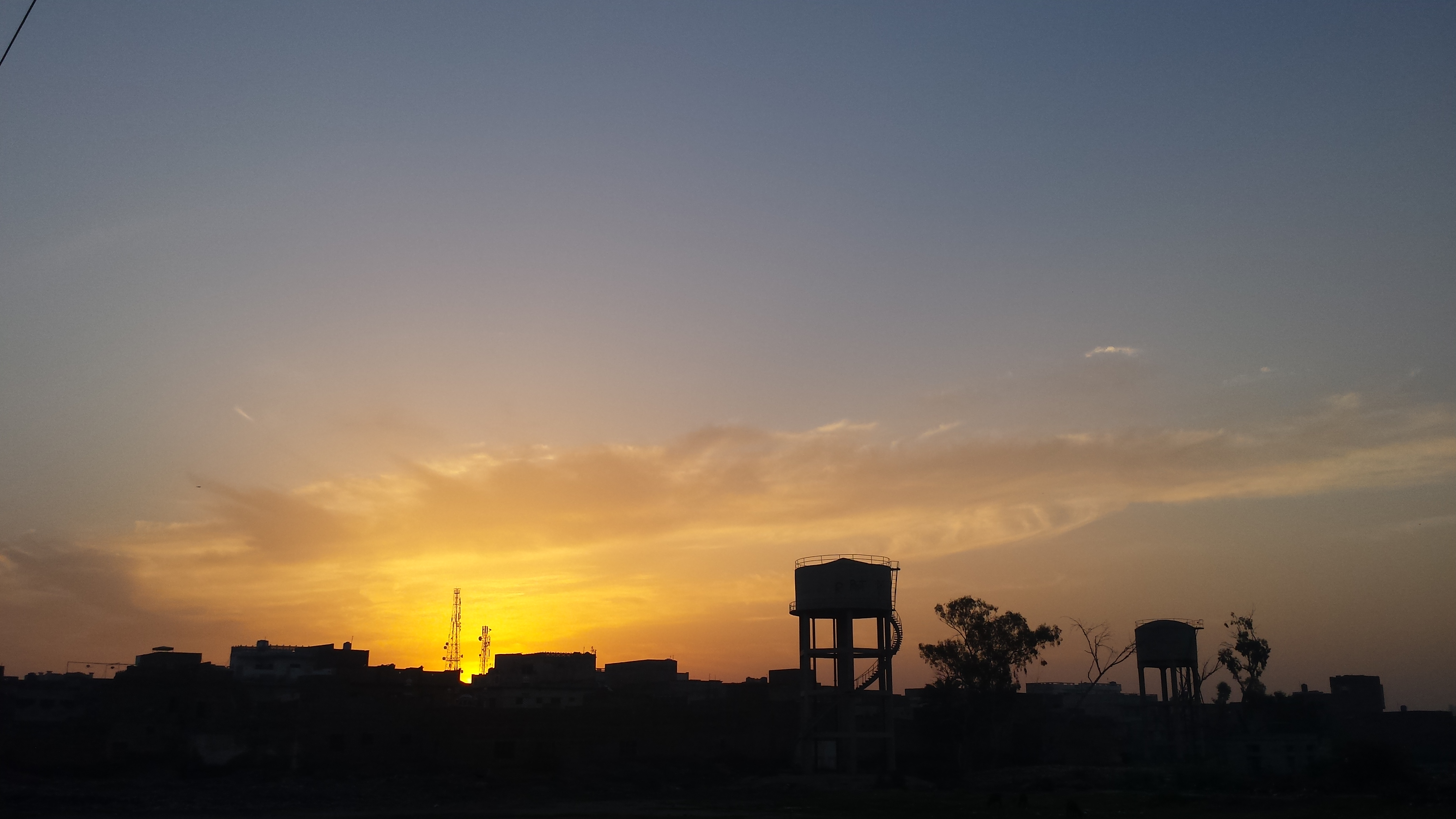
Old water supply system Dijkot

Dijkot was once named the “State of Dijkot.” The name "Dijkot" is derived from the word ‘ditch,’ which roughly translates to 'fort,' or 'city inside a fort'.

Dijkot is named after a warrior tribe. The city was destroyed in 326 BC, when it was attacked by the army of Alexander the Great and as a result, the population declined significantly.

The city was eventually re-inhabited and ruled by Chandragupta Maurya, who brought the town back to some significance. In 712 AD, Muhammad ibn al-Qasim attacked and occupied Sindh, in southeast Pakistan. Qasim reached Chiniot, a city in Punjab, devastating Dijkot on the way.

Dijkot was attacked in 1460 by local tribes and once again destroyed. It was rebuilt for a second time in 1462 by the Sufi saint Baba Sher Shah, who lived south of the state. In 1908, a police station was established in Dijkot, along with a government high school during the British Empire period in India.

== Education ==
- Government Primary Schools
- Government Higher Secondary Schools (for males & females)
- Government College for Boys
- Government Post Graduate College for Women

== Health ==
- Civil Hospital, Dijkot
