= Mustafaabad, Kasur =

Mustafabad مصطفٰے آباد
- City
- Location of Mustafabad Mustafabad (Pakistan) Mustafabad (South Asia) Mustafabad (Asia)
- Coordinates: 31.25176°N 74.42211°E
- Country: Pakistan
- Province: Punjab
- District: Kasur
- Tehsil: Kasur Tehsil

Government
  - Type: Municipal Committee
  - Chairman: Vacant
  - Vice Chairman: Vacant
  - Chief Officer: Shaheen Ahmed Hayat

Population (2023)
  - City: 81,550
  - Rank: 155th in Pakistan
- Time zone: UTC+5 (PST)

Mustafabad (Urdu: مصطفٰے آباد), is a city in Kasur District in the Punjab province of Pakistan. It is part of Kasur Tehsil. Its population is over 81,550.

== Demographics ==
=== Population ===
Historical population
Year	Pop.	±% p.a.
1972	16,471	—
1981	20,927	+2.70%
1998	37,498	+3.49%
2017	60,578	+2.56%
2023	81,550	+5.08%

According to the 2023 census Mustafabad city had a population of 81,550.

=== Languages ===
Languages of Mustafaabad city (2023 Census)
1. Punjabi (89.2%)
2. Mewati (9.20%)
3. Urdu (1.00%)
4. Others (0.60%)

According to the 2023 census, Punjabi is the predominant language in Mustafabad, spoken by 89.2% of the population, followed by Mewati (9.2%), Urdu (1.0%) and other languages (0.6%).
