= Kasur District =

Coordinates: 31°00′N 74°10′E

Kasur District ضلع قصور
- District of Punjab
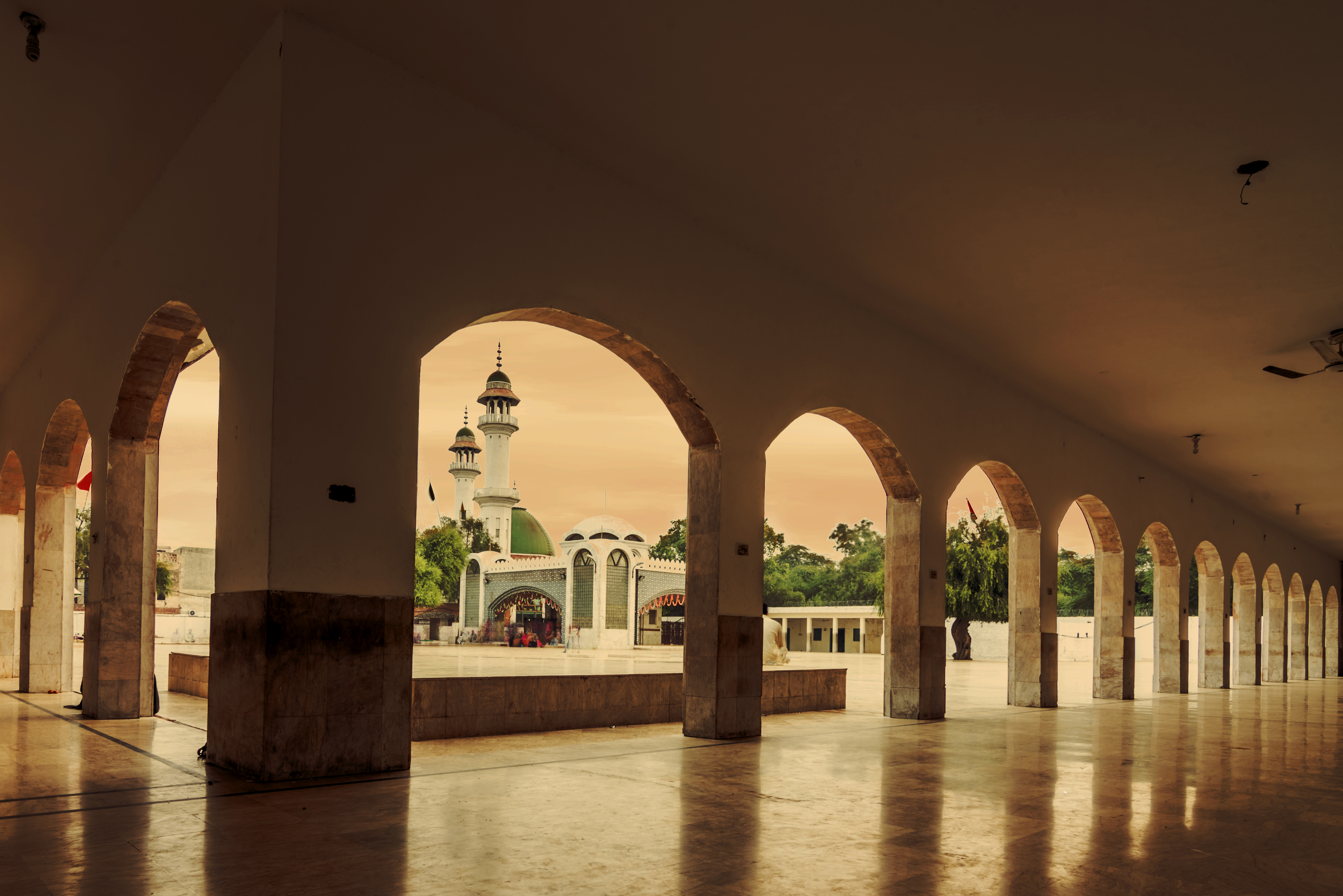
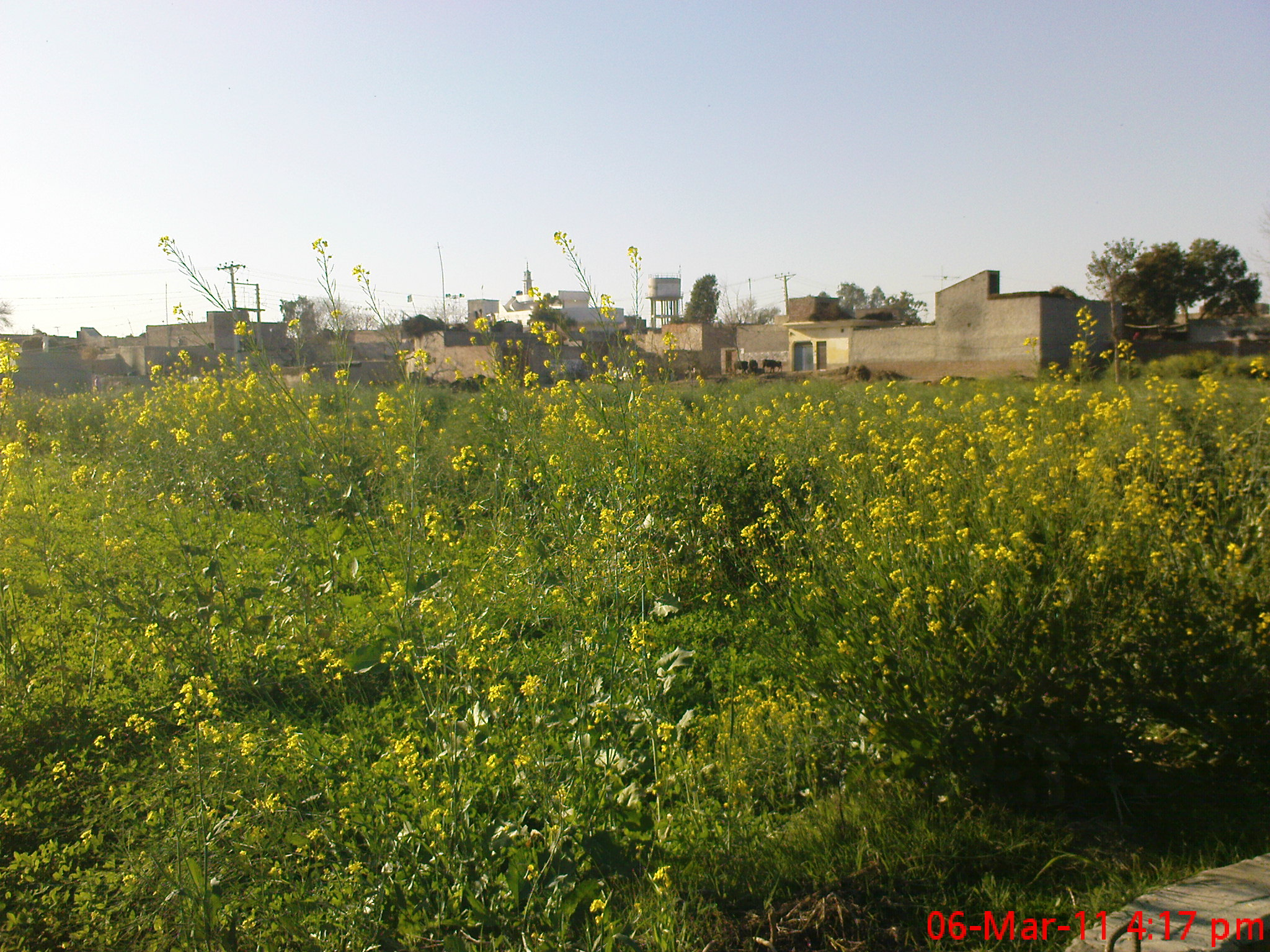
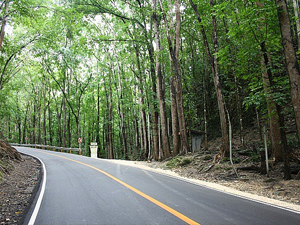
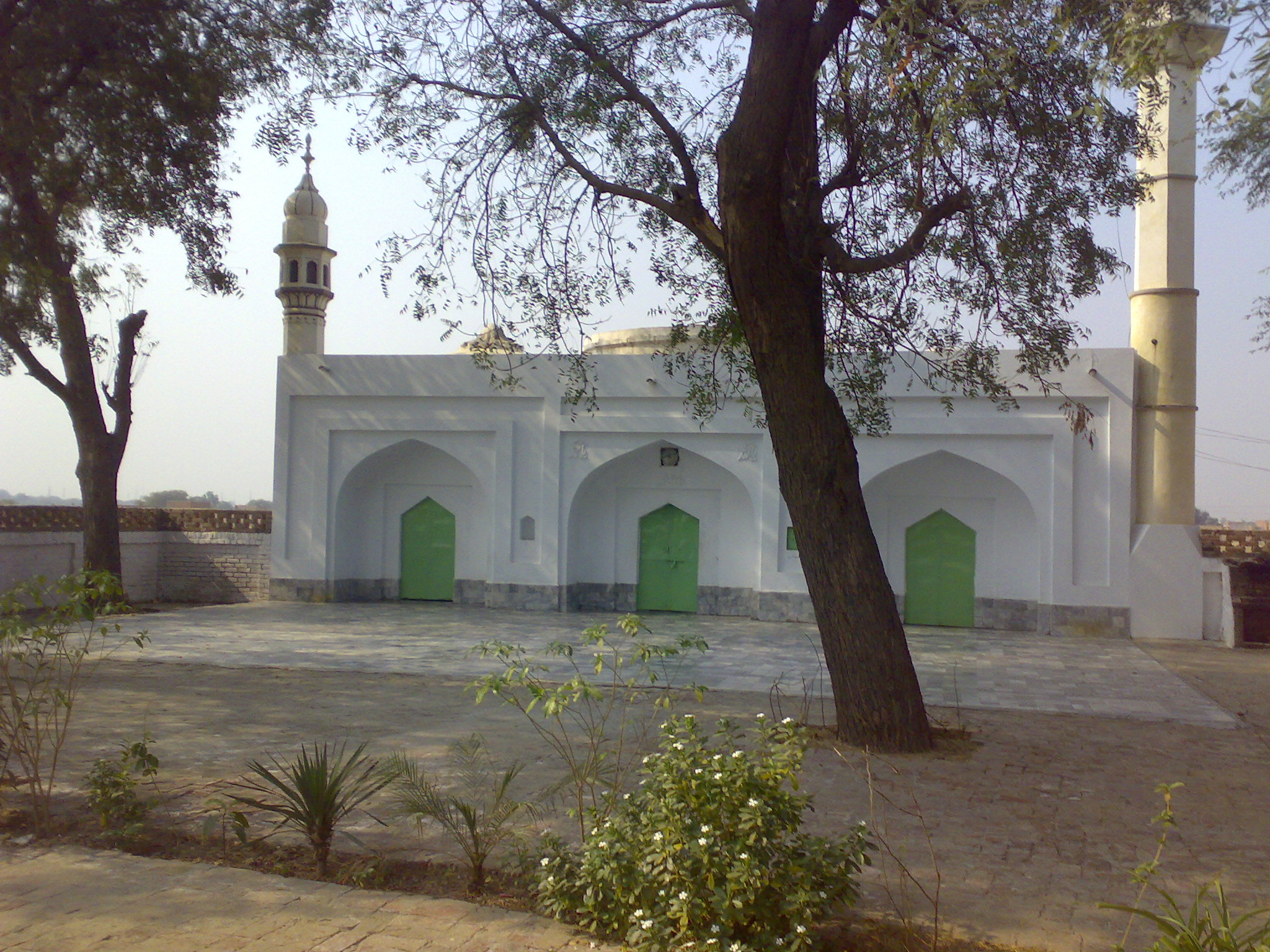
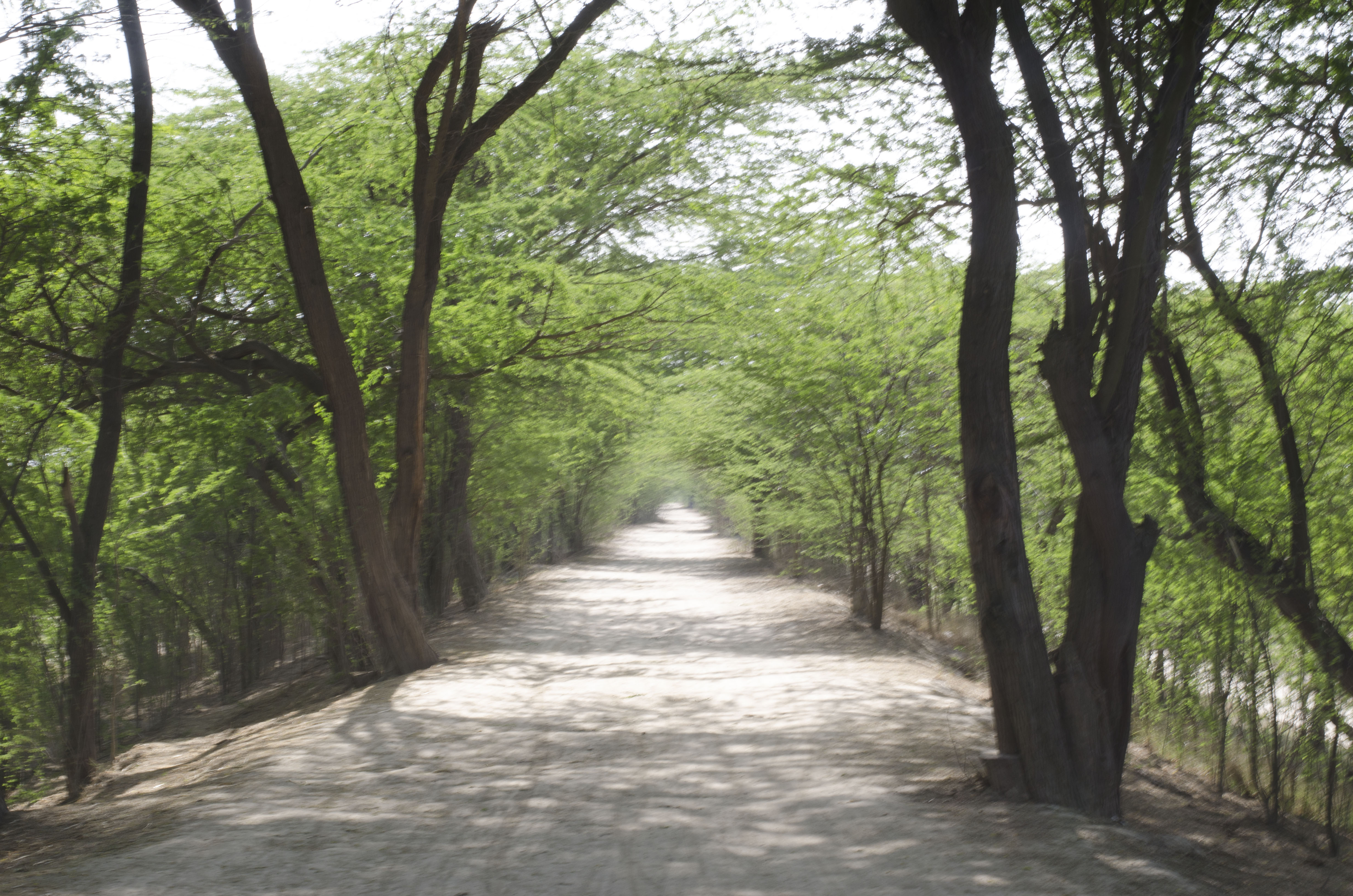
- From top left to right; Tomb of Bulleh Shah, Gohar Jageer, Changa Manga, Jinn Mosque of Kasur, Fields near Ganda Singh Wala

- Map of Kasur District (highlighted in red) within Punjab.
- Country: Pakistan
- Province: Punjab
- Division: Lahore
- Established: 1 July 1976; 50 years ago
- Headquarters: Kasur
- Administrative Subdivisions: 04: Chunian Tehsil Kasur Tehsil Kot Radha Kishan Tehsil Pattoki Tehsil

Government
  - Type: District Administration
  - Deputy Commissioner: Muhammad Asif Raza (PAS)
  - Constituensy: NA-131 Kasur-I; NA-132 Kasur-II; NA-133 Kasur-III; NA-134 Kasur-IV

Area
  - District of Punjab: 3,995 km^{2} (1,542 sq mi)
- Elevation: 218 m (715 ft)

Population (2023)
  - District of Punjab: 4,084,286
  - Density: 1,022.3/km^{2} (2,648/sq mi)
  - Urban: 1,243,882
  - Rural: 2,840,404
- Demonym: Kasuri

Literacy
  - Literacy rate: Total: (62.85%); Male: (67.97%); Female: (57.44%)
- Time zone: UTC+05:00 (PKT)
  - Summer (DST): DST is not observed
- ZIP Code: 55050
- NWD (area) code: 049
- ISO 3166 code: PK-PB
- Website: kasur.punjab.gov.pk

Kasur District (Note: Punjabi, Urdu: ضلع قصور, romanized: Zilā Qasūr) is a district within the Lahore Division of Punjab, Pakistan. It was established on 1 July 1976; prior to its creation, the area comprised two tehsils (Kasur Tehsil and Chunian Tehsil) of Lahore District. According to the 2023 Pakistani census Kasur District had a population of 4,081,568 (4.08 million).

The district capital is Kasur city, the birth city of the Sufi poet Bulleh Shah, who is well known in that region as well as in the whole of Pakistan. The total area of the district is 3,995 square kilometres.

There is a DHQ hospital in Kasur city which has been recently named as Bulleh Shah Hospital. There is a THQ Hospital in each of its tehsils. Apart from main hospitals, there are 12 rural health centers and 82 basic health units in Kasur district.

== Geography ==
The district is bounded by the Ravi River in the north-west and river Sutlej in the south-east. Whereas the old course of Beas River bifurcates the district into two equal parts locally known as Hither and Uthar or Mithan Majh. Both of the areas have a height differential of approximately 5.5 meters. The natural surface elevation of the district is 198 meters above the sea level, having a general slope from north-east to south- west. Whereas the east and west ends of the district comprise the flood plains of the rivers Satluj and Ravi, characterized by breaching of looping river Channels braided around meander bars. Kasur district is attached with Lahore from east, attached with Nankana Sahib from north, attached with Faisalabad from west and attached with Okara and India from south.

=== Topography ===
Topographically speaking, Kasur District lies between the river Satluj which flows along its boundaries with India and river Ravi which flows its boundary with Nankana Sahib District. The districts may be divided into two parts, a low lying or riverine area along the two bordering rivers and upland, away from the rivers. The riverine area is generally inundates during monsoon season. The water level in this area is higher than in the upland. The soil is sandy. The upland is flat plains sloping from north-west to south-west. The general height of the area is from 150 to 200 meters above the sea level.

=== Flora ===
Flora of the district has been greatly modified by human agency of the old open forests of small trees and shrubs; there remains only a few Rakhs or portions of forest which are kept as gazing ground for cattle etc. Amongst trees the most important are Kikar (Acacia arabica), Shisham or Tahli (Dalbergia sissoo), Beri (Zizyphus jajaba), Toot (Morus marlaccae), Sharin (Albizzia lebbek), Dharek (Malia azerdaracb), Phulahi (Acacia modesta), and Nim (Melia indica), Piple (Ficus indica) are planted for shade. The growth in Rakhs is composed mainly of three kinds of trees Jand (Prosopis spicigera), Karril (Capparis aphylla), and van or Jal (Salvadora obeoides). Occasionally pelu (acacia Loucophhloea) and Farash (Tamarix articulate) are also found. Pilchi (Tamarix gallio) is found on moist sandy soil along the rivers and is used for wicker-work, basket making etc.

=== Fauna ===
Wolf and jackal are the only wild animals of any importance. The former being met with occasionally in the low land wastes of Chunian Tehsil but jackals are found everywhere. Changa Manga reserve a thick forest is the only area in which a few Nelgai, pig, peafowl and here are found.

== History ==
In ancient time, Kasur was known for its education and fish. The history of Kasur is more than 1,000 years. The Kasur region was an agricultural region with forests during the Indus Valley civilization. The Vedic period is characterized by Indo-Aryan culture that migrated from Central Asia and settled in Punjab region. The Kambojas, Daradas, Kaikayas, Pauravas, Yaudheyas, Malavas and Kurus migrated, settled and ruled ancient Punjab region. After overrunning the Achaemenid Empire in 331 BCE, Alexander marched into present-day Punjab region with an army of 50,000. The Kasur region was ruled by Maurya Empire, Indo-Greek kingdom, Kushan Empire, Gupta Empire, White Huns, Kushano-Hephthalites and the Turk and Hindu Shahi kingdoms.

In 997 CE, Sultan Mahmud Ghaznavi, took over the Ghaznavid dynasty empire established by his father, Sultan Sebuktegin, In 1005 he conquered the Shahis in Kabul in 1005, and followed it by the conquests of Punjab region. The Delhi Sultanate and later Mughal Empire ruled the region. The Punjab region became predominantly Muslim due to missionary Sufi saints whose dargahs dot the landscape of the Punjab region.

The Mughal Empire ruled Kasur for 200 years. After and during the decline of the Mughal Empire, the Sikhs took over the Kasur District. The agriculture lands were given to leaders and supporters of the Sikh army. Most of the Punjab region was annexed by the East India Company in 1849, and was one of the last areas of the South Asia to fall under British colonial rule. During the British Raj, the irrigation canals were built that irrigated large areas barren lands of the Kasur District.

The predominantly Muslim population supported Muslim League and Pakistan Movement. After the independence of Pakistan in 1947, the minority Sikhs and Hindus migrated to India while the Muslim refugees from India settled in the Kasur District.

== Demographics ==
Historical population
Year	Pop.	±% p.a.
1951	760,304	—
1961	853,877	+1.17%
1972	1,186,386	+3.03%
1981	1,528,002	+2.85%
1998	2,375,875	+2.63%
2017	3,454,881	+1.99%
2023	4,084,286	+2.83%

As of the 2023 census, Kasur district has 645,308 households and a population of 4,084,286. The district has a sex ratio of 104.53 males to 100 females and a literacy rate of 62.85%: 67.97% for males and 57.44% for females. 1,146,988 (28.10% of the surveyed population) are under 10 years of age. 1,243,882 (30.46%) live in urban areas.

Religion in Kasur district (2023)
Religion	Percent
Islam	96.52%
Christianity	3.43%
Other or not stated	0.05%

Religion in contemporary Kasur District
Religious group	1941		2017		2023	
Religious group	Pop.	%	Pop.	%	Pop.	%
Islam	368,590	60.00%	3,333,273	96.48%	3,939,584	96.52%
Sikhism	145,919	23.75%	—	—	53	~0%
Hinduism	77,923	12.69%	243	0.01%	475	0.01%
Christianity	21,170	3.45%	119,801	3.47%	140,136	3.43%
Ahmadiyya	—N/a	—N/a	1,094	0.03%	803	0.02%
Others (Note: Including Anglo-Indian Christians, British Christians, Buddhism, Zoroastrianism, Judaism, Tribals, others, or not stated)	672	0.11%	470	0.01%	517	0.02%
Total Population	614,274	100%	3,454,881	100%	4,081,568	100%
Note: 1941 census data is for Chunian and part of Kasur tehsil of erstwhile Lahore district, which roughly corresponds to contemporary Kasur district. Figures for rural part of present area of erstwhile Kasur tehsil were obtained from the ratio of 1951 census figures of Kasur, which became Pakistan, and Patti tehsils, which became India. Religious demographics in rural areas were assumed to be homogenous. District and tehsil borders have changed since 1941.

Languages of Kasur district (2023)
1. Punjabi (84.3%)
2. Mewati (11.5%)
3. Urdu (3.36%)
4. Others (0.82%)

At the time of the 2023 census, 84.29% of the population spoke Punjabi, 11.53% Mewati and 3.36% Urdu as their first language.

== Development ==
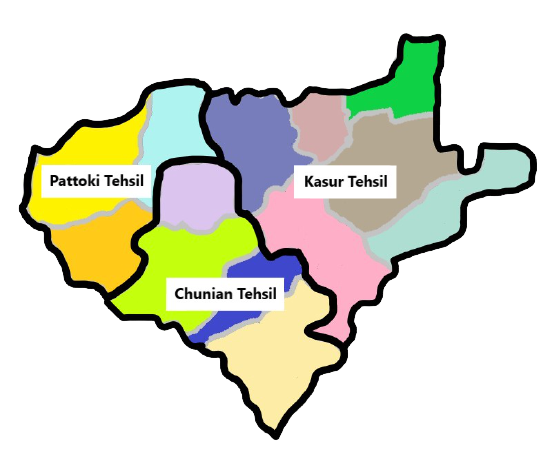
Map showing the three tehsils of Kasur -Pattoki, Kasur, Chunian.

The Bambawali-Ravi-Bedian Canal was built in Kasur district increasing the agricultural development of the area. There has been commercial and industrial development but the area remain mainly agricultural. Pakistan Army built Cantonment area for an infantry brigade in the district.

== Administrative divisions ==
The district is administratively subdivided into 4 Tehsils - Chunian, Kasur, Kot Radha Kishan and Pattoki - spanning a territory of 13 divisions and 125 Union Councils: the total area of Kasur is 3995 km^{2}.

Tehsil	Area (km²)	Pop. (2023)	Density (ppl/km²) (2023)	Literacy rate (2023)	Union Councils
Chunian	1,212	979,746	808.37	60.64%	...
Kasur	1,493	1,603,658	1,074.12	63.63%	...
Kot Radha Kishan	398	424,875	1,067.53	64.66%	...
Pattoki	892	1,076,007	1,206.29	62.98%	...

== Places of interest ==
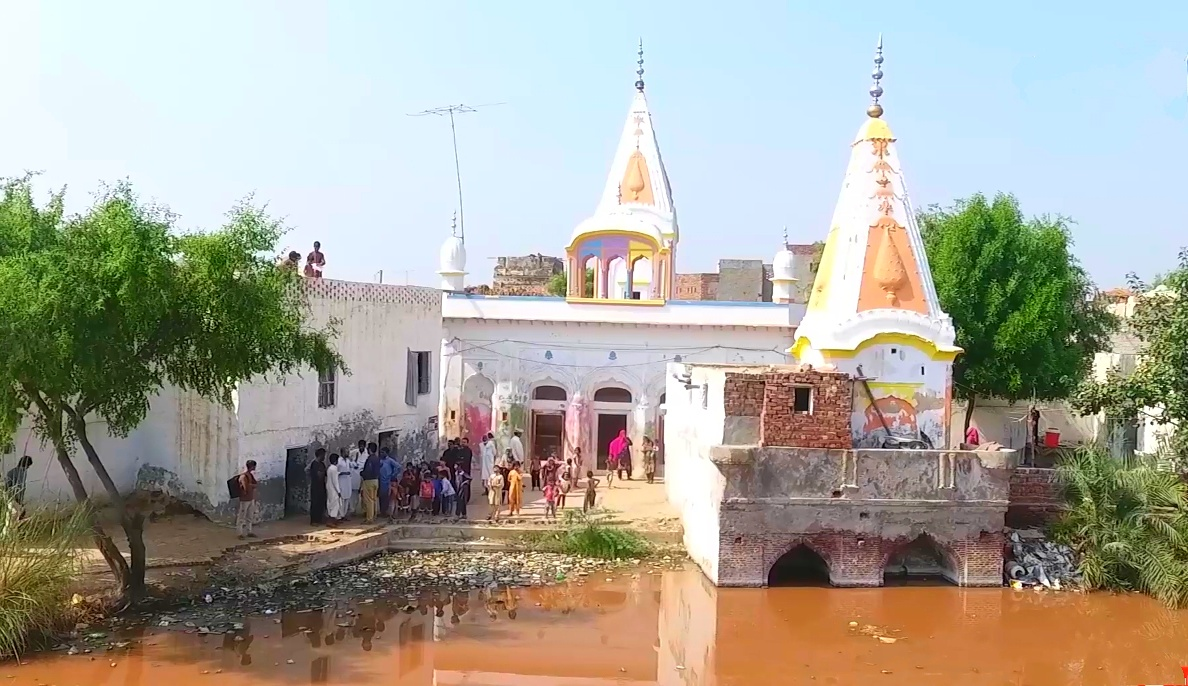
Baba Ram Thaman Shrine, a 16-century Hindu shrine from pre-partition.

Kasur famous for Kasuri methi, Kasuri fish, and Kasuri andarsay. The city is also the resting place of Sufi poet Bulleh Shah. Other places of interest include:

- Baba Ram Thaman Shrine, Hindu/Sikh shrine famous for continued annual Vaisaki fair
- Baloki is famous for the Ravi River. Many of the people visit this village. Balloki Power Plant is also situated in Baloki.
- Phool Nagar industrial area
- Pattoki is the 7th dense industrial area of Pakistan
- Chunian is famous for its sugar mills. Abdullah Sugar Mill is the largest sugar mill of Pakistan
- Kot Radha Kishan is famous for being related to lord Krishna and his beloved Radha (of Hinduism)
- Changa Manga, the largest forest of Pakistan
- Shrine of Baba Bulleh Shah, Kasur City
- Ganda Singh Wala Border, Pakistan-India Border
- Balloki Headworks & many resorts
- Changa Manga Forest, near Chunian Town
- Shrine of Atta Ullah Vato Khuveshgi Alias Peer Bolna Sarkar
- Shrine of Baba Sadar Dewan
- Kasur Museum
- Tomb of Baba Kamal Chishti
- Shrine of Abdullah Shah Bukhari (Baba Sha Jhanda), near Pattoki city in the village also named after him
- Gurdwara Hardo Sahari and Samadh Pir Sahari Chhina Jatt. Village Hardo Sahari

Qadiwind is a historically significant to the Sikh religion. After the independence in 1947, the Sikhs there emigrated to East Punjab in India. Punjabi writer Baba Sohan Singh Sital was a resident of this village. His house and garden area was allotted to Muslim refugees from Mewat who came as part of independence.

== Notable people ==
- Mohammad Akram, former Pakistani cricketer
- Aseff Ahmad Daula (21 October 1940 – 19 May 2022) was a Pakistani politician who served as the 18th Foreign Minister of Pakistan from 1993 to 199 former MNA.
- Tahir Aslam Gora, Pakistan-Canadian writer, broadcaster and translator.
- Noor Jehan, playback singer and actress
- Khurshid Mahmud Kasuri, former Foreign Minister and now member of PTI
- Malik Meraj Khalid, Speaker of the National Assembly twice, and Prime Minister of Pakistan in 1997.
- Bade Ghulam Ali Khan, Indian classical vocalist.
- Barkat Ali Khan, classical vocalist.
- Rana Muhammad Iqbal Khan, Pakistani politician who was the Speaker of the Provincial Assembly of the Punjab from 2008 to May 2018. Now MPA.
- Sardar Muhammad Arif Nakai, ex-Chief Minister of Punjab, Pakistan.
- Bebe Nanaki, sister of Guru Nanak
- Maharani Datar Kaur, Queen Consort of the Sikh Empire and wife of Maharaja Ranjit Singh
- Moeenuddin Ahmad Qureshi, ex-vice-President of World Bank and Prime Minister of Pakistan in 1993.

== See also ==
- Alahabad, Pakistan
- Mustafaabad, Kasur
