= Postal codes in Pakistan =

Postal codes in Pakistan were introduced by the Pakistan Post on 1 January 1988 to improve the addressing and sortation (and delivery) of mail. Pakistan's postal codes have 5 digits: two to specify the district for routing, followed by three more to narrow it down to the exact post office.

Usage of the post/zip codes has been limited. Around 2025, the Pakistan Post launched a mobile app, which among various features, provides postal codes.

The numbers are sometimes written in various scripts, not just Latin / Western Arabic numerals, but also Indian numerals, such as Devanagari, Bangla, and Urdu.

These codes are for the delivery post office in whose jurisdiction the residential, office, industrial, rural, or PO Box address falls. Non-delivery post offices also are assigned pseudo-codes for audit and accounting purposes, but these are for internal Pakistan Post use only.

Moreover, Pakistan Post Office is one of the oldest government departments in the South Asia. In 1947, it began functioning as the Department of Posts and Telegraph. In 1962 it was separated from the Telegraph & Telephone and started working as an independent post office.

GPO stands for General Post Office, the main post office in the city. For larger cities (Karachi and Lahore), there are a number of GPOs; however, the main one is the only one which has just the city's name attached to it (Karachi GPO and Lahore GPO).
