= NA-75 Narowal-I =

Constituency of the National Assembly of Pakistan

- Constituency for the National Assembly of Pakistan
- Region: Shakargarh Tehsil and Zafarwal Tehsil (partly) of Narowal District
- Electorate: 507,995

Current constituency
- Party: Pakistan Muslim League (N)
- Member: Anwaarul Haq Chaudhary
- Created from: NA-115 (Narowal-I); NA-116 (Narowal-II)

NA-75 Narowal-I (این اے-75، نارووال-١) is a constituency for the National Assembly of Pakistan. It comprises the Zafarwal Tehsil and a majority of Shakargarh Tehsil, apart from Bara Manga, Kanjroor, and Dudhu Chak that are included in NA-78. The Shakargarh areas are taken from the now-abolished Constituency NA-116.

== Members of Parliament ==
=== 2018–2023: NA-77 Narowal-I ===
Election	Member	Party
2018	Mehnaz Aziz	PML (N)

=== 2024–present: NA-75 Narowal-I ===
Election	Member	Party
2024	Anwaarul Haq Chaudhary	PML (N)

== Election 2002 ==
General elections were held on 10 October 2002. Muhammad Nasir Khan of PML-Q won by 32,104 votes.

General election 2002: NA-115 Narowal-I
Party	Candidate	Votes	%	±%
PML(Q)	Muhammad Nasir Khan	32,104	32.01	
Independent	Sumaira Yasser Rasheed	27,316	27.24	
Independent	Mansoor Sarwar Khan	11,834	11.80	
PPP	Ch. Muhammad Akbar Kahlun	11,604	11.57	
PML(N)	Ch. Muhammad Rafique	8,404	8.38	
MMA	Muhammad Tahir Aslam	7,428	7.41	
Others	Others (two candidates)	1,592	1.59	
Turnout		104,841	44.15	
Total valid votes		100,282	95.65	
Rejected ballots		4,559	4.35	
Majority		4,788	4.77	
Registered electors		237,486		

== Election 2008 ==
General elections were held on 18 Feb 2008. Sumaira Naz of PML-N won by 59,688 votes.

General election 2008: NA-115 Narowal-I
Party	Candidate	Votes	%	±%
PML(N)	Sumaira Naz	59,688	53.65	
PML(Q)	Muhammad Nasir Khan	40,205	36.14	
PPP	Tariq Ashrif Kahloon	10,960	9.85	
Others	Others (three candidates)	403	0.36	
Turnout		114,850	56.83	
Total valid votes		111,256	96.87	
Rejected ballots		3,594	3.13	
Majority		19,483	17.51	
Registered electors		202,087		
PML(N) gain from PML(Q)				

== Election 2013 ==
General elections were held on 11 May 2013. Mian Muhammad Rashid of the PML-N won by 71,139 votes and became a member of the National Assembly.

General election 2013: NA-115 Narowal-I
Party	Candidate	Votes	%	±%
PML(N)	Mian Muhammad Rasheed	71,139	49.94	
Independent	Muhammad Irfan Abid	49,358	34.65	
PTI	Mansoor Sarwar Khan	13,541	9.51	
Others	Others (nine candidates)	8,407	5.90	
Turnout		148,214	59.86	
Total valid votes		142,445	96.11	
Rejected ballots		5,769	3.89	
Majority		21,781	15.29	
Registered electors		247,582		
PML(N) hold				

== Election 2018 ==
General elections were held on 25 July 2018.

General election 2018: NA-77 Narowal-I
Party	Candidate	Votes	%	±%
PML(N)	Mehnaz Aziz	106,366	38.16	
Independent	Muhammad Tariq Anis	70,596	25.33	
PTI	Mian Muhammad Rashid	52,231	18.74	
TLP	Muhammad Ashfaq Taj	20,510	7.36	
Others	Others (seven candidates)	17,882	6.42	
Turnout		278,704	54.86	
Rejected ballots		11,119	3.99	
Majority		35,770	12.83	
Registered electors		507,995		
PML(N) hold		Swing	N/A	

== Election 2024 ==
General elections were held on 8 February 2024. Anwaarul Haq Chaudhary won the election with 100,116 votes.

General election 2023: NA-75 Narowal-I
Party	Candidate	Votes	%	±%
PML(N)	Anwaarul Haq Chaudhary	100,116	31.79	▼6.37
PTI	Tahir Ali Javed (Note: Filed nomination papers as PTI candidate but ECP allowed him to run as an Independent)	75,626	24.02	▲5.28
Independent	Daniyal Aziz	50,984	16.19	
TLP	Muhammad Ahsan	34,078	10.82	▲3.46
Independent	Mian Muhammad Usman Rasheed	19,045	6.05	
Independent	Muhammad Talha Anees	18,339	5.82	
Others	Others (fourteen candidates)	16,697	5.30	
Turnout		324,716	51.64	▼3.22
Total valid votes		314,885	96.97	
Rejected ballots		9,831	3.03	
Majority		24,490	7.78	▼5.05
Registered electors		628,860		
PML(N) hold		Swing	N/A	

== See also ==
- NA-74 Sialkot-V
- NA-76 Narowal-II
