= NA-76 Narowal-II =

Constituency of the National Assembly of Pakistan

- Constituency for the National Assembly of Pakistan
- Region: Narowal Tehsil and Zafarwal Tehsil (partly) of Narowal District
- Electorate: 516,249

Current constituency
- Party: Pakistan Muslim League (N)
- Member: Ahsan Iqbal
- Created from: NA-117 Narowal-III; NA-116 Narowal-II

NA-76 Narowal-II (این اے-76، نارووال-2) is a constituency for the National Assembly of Pakistan. It comprises the Narowal Tehsil and the areas of Bara Manga, Kanjroor, and Dudhu Chak from Shakargarh Tehsil. The Shakargarh areas are taken from the now-abolished Constituency NA-116.

== Members of Parliament ==
=== 2018–2023: NA-78 Narowal-II ===
| Election | Member | Party |
|---|---|---|
| 2018 | Ahsan Iqbal | PML (N) |

=== 2024–present: NA-76 Narowal-II ===
| Election | Member | Party |
|---|---|---|
| 2024 | Ahsan Iqbal | PML (N) |

== Election 2002 ==
General elections were held on 10 October 2002. Riffat Javed of PML-Q won by 49,367 votes.

General election 2002: NA-117 Narowal-III
| Party | Candidate | Votes | % | ±% |
|---|---|---|---|---|
| PML(Q) | Riffat Javaid Kahloon | 49,367 | 48.84 | |
| PML(N) | Ahsan Iqbal | 33,698 | 33.34 | |
| PPP | Ch. Anwar-Ul-Haq | 16,075 | 15.90 | |
| Others | Others (three candidates) | 1,942 | 1.92 | |
| Turnout | | 104,828 | 46.22 | |
| Total valid votes | | 101,082 | 96.43 | |
| Rejected ballots | | 3,746 | 3.57 | |
| Majority | | 15,669 | 15.50 | |
| Registered electors | | 226,808 | | |

== Election 2008 ==
General elections were held on 18 February 2008. Ahsan Iqbal of PML-N won by 66,633 votes.

General election 2008: NA-117 Narowal-III
| Party | Candidate | Votes | % | ±% |
|---|---|---|---|---|
| PML(N) | Ahsan Iqbal | 66,633 | 58.55 | |
| PML(Q) | Riffat Javaid Kahloon | 36,231 | 31.84 | |
| PPP | Ibne Saeed Ch. | 10,604 | 9.32 | |
| Others | Others (two candidates) | 341 | 0.29 | |
| Turnout | | 118,056 | 55.30 | |
| Total valid votes | | 113,809 | 96.40 | |
| Rejected ballots | | 4,247 | 3.60 | |
| Majority | | 30,402 | 26.71 | |
| Registered electors | | 213,474 | | |
| PML(N) gain from PML(Q) | | | | |

== Election 2013 ==
General elections were held on 11 May 2013. Ahsan Iqbal of PML-N won by 95,481 votes and became the member of National Assembly.

General election 2013: NA-117 Narowal-III
| Party | Candidate | Votes | % | ±% |
|---|---|---|---|---|
| PML(N) | Ahsan Iqbal | 95,481 | 61.75 | |
| PTI | Abrar-ul-Haq | 51,359 | 33.21 | |
| Others | Others (seven candidates) | 7,797 | 5.04 | |
| Turnout | | 157,704 | 57.79 | |
| Total valid votes | | 154,637 | 98.06 | |
| Rejected ballots | | 3,067 | 1.94 | |
| Majority | | 44,122 | 28.54 | |
| Registered electors | | 272,892 | | |
| PML(N) hold | | | | |

== Election 2018 ==
General elections were held on 25 July 2018.

General election 2018: NA-78 Narowal-II
| Party | Candidate | Votes | % | ±% |
|---|---|---|---|---|
| PML(N) | Ahsan Iqbal | 159,651 | 57.47 | |
| PTI | Abrar-ul-Haq | 88,250 | 31.77 | |
| Others | Others (ten candidates) | 29,918 | 10.77 | |
| Turnout | | 284,256 | 55.06 | |
| Rejected ballots | | 6,437 | 2.27 | |
| Majority | | 71,401 | 25.12 | |
| Registered electors | | 516,249 | | |
| PML(N) hold | | Swing | N/A | |

== Election 2024 ==
General elections were held on 8 February 2024. Ahsan Iqbal won the election with 137,042 votes.

General election 2024: NA-76 Narowal-II
| Party | Candidate | Votes | % | ±% |
|---|---|---|---|---|
| PML(N) | Ahsan Iqbal | 137,042 | 45.54 | ▼11.93 |
| PTI | Javaid Safdar Kahlon (Note: Filed nomination papers as PTI candidate but ECP allowed him to run as an Independent) | 110,278 | 36.64 | ▲4.87 |
| TLP | Syed Jehanzaib Bukhari | 33,724 | 11.21 | ▲3.86 |
| Others | Others (seventeen candidates) | 19,913 | 6.62 | |
| Turnout | | 308,849 | 50.69 | ▼4.37 |
| Total valid votes | | 300,957 | 97.44 | |
| Rejected ballots | | 7,892 | 2.56 | |
| Majority | | 26,764 | 8.89 | ▼16.23 |
| Registered electors | | 609,280 | | |
| PML(N) hold | | Swing | N/A | |

== See also ==
- NA-75 Narowal-I
- NA-77 Gujranwala-I
