= Ghota Fatehgarh =

- Village
- Location within Pakistan
- Coordinates: 32.09°N 74.78°E
- Country: Pakistan
- Province: Punjab
- District: Narowal
- Established: 1800

Area
  - Total: 0.5 km^{2} (0.19 sq mi)

Population (2015)
  - Total: 10,000
- Time zone: UTC+5 (PST)
- Postal code span: 51600
- Area code: 0542

Ghota Fatehgarh is a village in Narowal District of Punjab province in Pakistan.

== History ==
The village was populated in early 1800 B.C by a woman named Ghotam Rakhi. It was originally called Ghota and eventually "Fateh Garh". Later its name was registered by the district government as Ghota Fatehgarh. It is a main shopping center for nearby area.

== Etymology ==
There are several theories as to the origin of the name. The most famous of them is that it was named after Ghotam Rakhi who lived there. The village Is located approximately 7–8 km from Narowal. It is on the Ravi River about 8–9 km from the Indian border. Rice and wheat are the village's main agricultural products. There is a big playground where many games are played i.e. cricket (Hard ball+Tape ball), football, volleyball.

== List of educational institutions ==
- Govt. Higher Secondary School (Boys)
- Govt. Higher Secondary school (Girls)
- Iqra Public model school
- Dar-e-arqam School (Madina Branch)
- City School System
