= PP-56 Narowal-III =

Constituency of the Provincial Assembly of Punjab, Pakistan

- Constituency for the Provincial Assembly of Punjab
- Region: Shakargarh Tehsil (partly) including Kartarpur in Narowal District

Current constituency
- Member: vacant
- Created from: PP-134 Narowal-III (2002-2018); PP-48 Narowal-III (2018-2023)

PP-56 Narowal-III (پی پی-56، نارووال-3) is a Constituency of Provincial Assembly of Punjab.

== General elections 2024 ==
Provincial election 2024: PP-56 Narowal-III
Party	Candidate	Votes	%	±%
PML(N)	Mannan Khan	48,920	41.26	
Independent	Aleem Tariq (Note: Filed nomination papers as PTI candidate but ECP allowed him to run as an Independent)	35,678	30.09	
TLP	Abu Hafas Muhammad Ghayas Ud Din	11,552	9.74	
Independent	Muhammad Tariq Anees	6,700	5.65	
JI	Muhammad Tallat Rasheed	3,297	2.78	
Independent	Daniyal Aziz	2,583	2.18	
Pakistan Muslim Markazi League	Hijab Fatima	2,034	1.72	
Others	Others (eighteen candidates)	7,804	6.58	
Turnout		122,438	49.47	
Total valid votes		118,568	96.84	
Rejected ballots		3,870	3.16	
Majority		13,242	11.17	
Registered electors		247,516		
hold				

== General elections 2018 ==
Provincial election 2018: PP-48 Narowal-III
Party	Candidate	Votes	%	±%
PML(N)	Mannan Khan	47,255	44.67	
PTI	Muhammad Arif Khan	30,378	28.72	
Independent	Muhammad Anwar Aziz Chaudhry	8,869	8.38	
TLP	Muhammad Ashfaq Taj	8,595	8.12	
Independent	Ch. Umar Sharif Ahmed	6,853	6.48	
PPP	Zill E Huma	2,631	2.49	
Others	Others (four candidates)	1,212	1.15	
Turnout		109,627	51.58	
Total valid votes		105,793	96.50	
Rejected ballots		3,834	3.50	
Majority		16,877	15.95	
Registered electors		212,537		

== General elections 2013 ==
Provincial election 2013: PP-134 Narowal-III
Party	Candidate	Votes	%	±%
PML(N)	Mannan Khan	33,984	42.67	
Independent	Muhammad Arif Khan	11,816	14.84	
PML(Q)	Muhammad Abbas Choudhry	8,787	11.03	
PTI	Muhammad Saqib Idress Taj	5,548	6.97	
Independent	Muhammad Arshad Khan	5,529	6.94	
Independent	Muhammad Ishfaq Taj	5,380	6.76	
Independent	Ameen Khan	3,805	4.78	
TTP	Azad Khan	2,507	3.15	
Independent	Haji Asghar Ali Kahlon	1,060	1.33	
Others	Others (nine candidates)	1,225	1.54	
Turnout		82,805	55.68	
Total valid votes		79,641	96.18	
Rejected ballots		3,164	3.82	
Majority		22,168	27.83	
Registered electors		148,712		

== General elections 2008 ==
Provincial election 2008: PP-134 Narowal-III
Party	Candidate	Votes	%	±%
PML(Q)	Muhammad Abbas Chaudhary	17,361	26.70	
PML(N)	Yasin Khan	15,951	24.53	
Independent	Daniyal Aziz	12,078	18.57	
Independent	Muhammad Saqib Idrees Taj	10,308	15.85	
PPP	Ali Hussain Zahid	7,864	12.09	
Others	Others	1,461	2.25	
Turnout		68,852	55.75	
Total valid votes		65,023	94.44	
Rejected ballots		3,829	5.56	
Majority		1,410	2.17	
Registered electors		123,493		

== See also ==
- PP-55 Narowal-II
- PP-57 Narowal-IV
