= Phalwari =

- Village
- Location within Pakistan
- Coordinates: 32°17′24″N 75°10′16″E
- Country: Pakistan
- Province: Punjab
- District: Narowal District
- Tehsil: Shakargarh Tehsil

Area
  - Total: 100 km^{2} (39 sq mi)
- Time zone: UTC+5 (PST)
- Postal code span: 51800
- Area code: 0542

Phalwari is an administrative village in Shakargarh Tehsil, Narowal District, Pakistan. It is located very near to Shakargarh city.

== Demographics ==
The area of the village is approximately 100 square kilometers. The village has a primary school for girls and bBoys separately organized by the Government of the Punjab. It is one of the most populated village of Shakargarh. The southern side of the village is bonded with Maryal and Shakargarh.
