= Nonar =

NONAR
- Village
- Nonar
- Location within Pakistan
- Coordinates: 32.13°N 74.51°E
- Country: Pakistan
- Province: Punjab
- District: Narowal
- Elevation: 242 m (794 ft)

Population
  - Estimate: 10,000
- Time zone: UTC+5 (PST)

Nonar is a village in Zafarwal Tehsil of Narowal District in Punjab, Pakistan. Neighbouring settlements include Chida, Tapyala and Domala.
