= Ghanghran =

Town in Narowal, Punjab, Pakistan

Coordinates: 32.1368°N 75.0274°E

Ghanghran is a small town in Shakargarh Tehsil of Narowal District, in Pakistan.

Hundreds of years ago on the bank of river Ravi there was a boat parking place which connected the people on both side of the river. A person who was riding that boat its on his name Ganra singh. The town is also known as saint village because of its saint's places from every corner. Slowly the Ravi changed its flow to the south side but the town is still there.

== Amenities ==
Nowadays this village is facilitated by BHU (basic health unit), girls and boys high schools linked about eight more small and big towns.
