= Pindi Mana =

Village in Punjab, Pakistan

پنڈی ماناں
- Village
- Pindi Mana
- Location within Pakistan
- Coordinates: 32°17′25″N 75°10′16″E
- Country: Pakistan
- Province: Punjab
- District: Narowal
- Tehsil: Shakargarh
- Time zone: UTC+5 (PST)
- Postal code span: 51800
- Area code: 0542

Pindi Mana (Urdu: پنڈی ماناں) is a village in Shakargarh Tehsil, Narowal District in Punjab province of Pakistan. The village is located very close to Shakargarh city.

== Demographics ==
The area of the village is approximately 150 square kilometres (58 sq mi).

== Education ==
Pindi Mana has a primary school for girls and noys organised by the Government of the Punjab.

== Transportation ==
Pindi Mana has a railway station located 2 kilometres (1.2 mi) from the village.
