= Dhamthal =

Dhamthal is a village in Zafarwal Tehsil, Narowal District, of the Punjab province, Pakistan. It is situated on the main road to Lahore. The facilities in the village including government high schools for boys and girls, a post office and a mini telephone exchange. Dhamthal is the main market for this area because of its location. The village was the site of inter-ethnic violence in 1947. It is one of the biggest trade market for crops in Narowal. Sufi Waqas Naqashbandi is a famous saint (darvesh) of Dhamthal.
