= Hansowala =

- Village
- Location within Pakistan
- Coordinates: 32°16′0″N 75°10′0″E
- Country: Pakistan
- Province: Punjab
- District: Narowal
- Tehsil: Shakargarh

Area
  - Total: 12 km^{2} (4.6 sq mi)

Population (2006)
  - Total: 10,000
- Time zone: UTC+5 (PST)
- Postal code span: 51800
- Area code: 0542

Hansowala (Urdu: ہنسووالا), is a village in Shakargarh Tehsil, Narowal District of Punjab province, Pakistan. It is located at 32°16'0N 75°10'0E on the west bank of the Ravi River.

== Demographics ==
The total area of Hansowala is approximately 12 square kilometres. According to the 1998 census, Narowal District's population was 1,265,097 of which only 12.11% were urban It is an agricultural village, mainly producing wheat and rice. The literacy rate in Shakargarh is 85%.
