= Constituency NA-116 =

Former constituency of the National Assembly of Pakistan

Constituency NA-116 (Narowal-II45)
- Former constituency for the National Assembly of Pakistan
- Region: Narowal District

Former constituency
- Created: 2002
- Abolished: 2018

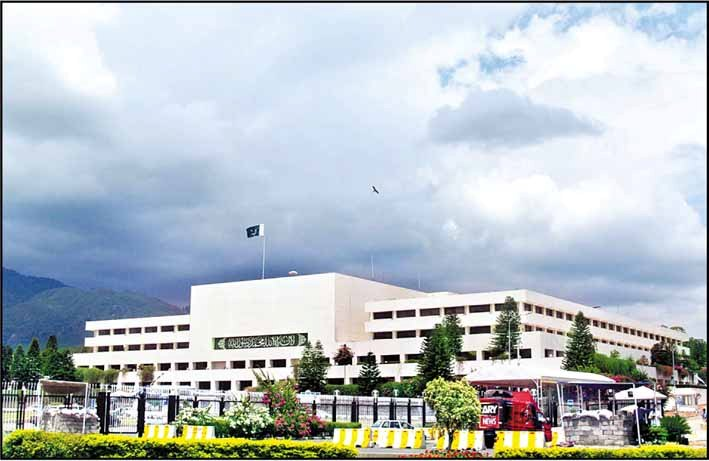
Parliament House, Islamabad

Constituency NA-116 (Narowal-II) (Urdu: این اے-۱۱۶، نارووال-٢) was a constituency for the National Assembly of Pakistan. It chiefly comprised the Shakargarh Tehsil before the Tehsil's area was divided among the constituencies of NA-77 and NA-78 in the 2018 delimitation. As a result, this constituency was abolished.

== Election 2002 ==
General elections were held on 10 October 2002. Daniyal Aziz of PML-Q won by 41,857 votes.

General election 2002: NA-116 Narowal-II
Party	Candidate	Votes	%	±%
PML(Q)	Daniyal Aziz Ch.	41,857	39.59	
Independent	Ch. Muhammd Tariq Anees	37,145	35.13	
PML(N)	Faisal Manzoor Rahim	10,039	9.50	
PAT	Mubarik Ali	9,235	8.73	
PPP	Muhammad Khalid Ch.	2,283	2.16	
MMA	Ch. Hassan Nizami	2,260	2.14	
Independent	Muhammad Suleman	2,071	1.96	
Independent	Attia Afzal Ch.	845	0.79	
Turnout		111,925	42.39	
Total valid votes		105,735	94.47	
Rejected ballots		6,190	5.53	
Majority		4,712	4.46	
Registered electors		264,030		

== Election 2008 ==
General elections were held on 18 February 2008. Muhammad Tariq Anis an independent candidate won by 45,097 votes.

General election 2008: NA-116 Narowal-II
Party	Candidate	Votes	%	±%
Independent	Ch. Muhammd Tariq Anees	45,097	39.44	
PML(Q)	Daniyal Aziz Ch.	37,138	32.48	
PML(N)	Dr. Shabbir Anmed	22,369	19.56	
PPP	Gulzar Ahmed Ch.	9,553	8.35	
Independent	Surraya Asghar	193	0.17	
Turnout		120,887	53.74	
Total valid votes		114,350	94.59	
Rejected ballots		6,537	5.41	
Majority		7,959	6.96	
Registered electors		224,956		

== Election 2013 ==
General elections were held on 11 May 2013. Daniyal Aziz of PML-N won by 91,409 votes and became a member of the National Assembly.

General election 2013: NA-116 Narowal-II
Party	Candidate	Votes	%	±%
PML(N)	Daniyal Aziz Ch.	91,545	62.50	
PPP	Ch. Muhammd Tariq Anees	40,308	27.52	
PTI	Wajina Akram	9,165	6.26	
Independent	Muhammad Akmal Sadiq	2,940	2.01	
Others	Others (four candidates)	2,526	1.71	
Turnout		151,787	55.82	
Total valid votes		146,484	96.51	
Rejected ballots		5,303	3.49	
Majority		51,237	34.98	
Registered electors		271,905		
