= Lohan, Pakistan =

Lohan
- Location within Pakistan
- Coordinates: 32.14°N 74.51°E
- Country: Pakistan
- Province: Punjab
- District: Narowal
- Elevation: 245 m (804 ft)
- Time zone: UTC+5 (PST)

Lohan is a village in Narowal District of Punjab province of Pakistan. It is located at 32°14'0N 74°51'0E at an altitude of 245 metres (807 feet). Neighbouring settlements include Depoke, Nonar and Tapyala
