= Lala, Narowal =

Lala
- Village
- Location within Pakistan
- Coordinates: 32.15°N 74.48°E
- Country: Pakistan
- Province: Punjab
- District: Narowal
- Elevation: 245 m (804 ft)
- Time zone: UTC+5 (PST)

Lala is a village in Narowal District of Punjab province in Pakistan. It is located at 32°15'0N 74°48'0E with an altitude of 245 metres (807 feet). Neighbouring settlements include Seowal, Khewa, Qila Sobha Singh and Depoke.
