= Chandarkey =

Chandarkey Rajputan چندرکےراجپوتاں
- Village
- Location in Pakistan
- Coordinates: 32°8′4″N 74°58′20″E
- Country: Pakistan
- Province: Punjab
- District: Narowal
- Tehsil: Narowal

Population
  - Languages: Punjabi
- Time zone: UTC+5 (PST)

Chandarkey Rajputan (Punjabi, Urdu: چندرکےراجپوتاں) is a historic village and a union council in Narowal District in the Punjab province of Pakistan. The village traces its roots back several years and is traditionally associated with the Rajput community, known for their bravery, honor and agricultural skills. Like many villages in Punjab, Chandarkay Rajputan developed around fertile farmlands, which sustained generations through wheat, rice, and other crops.
