= Tapyala =

Village in Punjab

Tapyala/Tapiala
- Location within Pakistan
- Coordinates: 32.14°N 74.53°E
- Country: Pakistan
- Province: Punjab
- Elevation: 241 m (791 ft)
- Time zone: UTC+5 (PST)

Tapyala/Tapiala is a village in Narowal District of Punjab province, Pakistan. It is located at 32°14'0N 74°53'0E with an altitude of 241 metres (793 feet). Neighbouring settlements include Nonar, Bolar, Depoke, and Lohan.
