= PP-57 Narowal-IV =

Constituency of the Provincial Assembly of Punjab, Pakistan

- Constituency for the Provincial Assembly of Punjab
- Region: Narowal Tehsil (partly) including Narowal city of Narowal District

Current constituency
- Created from: PP-136 Narowal-V (2002-2018); PP-50 Narowal-V (2018-2023)

PP-57 Narowal-IV (پی پی-57، نارووال-4) is a Constituency of Provincial Assembly of Punjab.

== General elections 2024 ==
Provincial election 2024: PP-57 Narowal-IV
Party	Candidate	Votes	%	±%
PML(N)	Khawaja Muhammad Waseem	52,691	42.01	
Independent	Rana Lal Badshah (Note: Filed nomination papers as PTI candidate but ECP allowed him to run as an Independent)	26,972	21.51	
Independent	Amjad Khan Kakar	18,156	14.48	
TLP	Mohammad Akhtar	16,981	13.54	
Pakistan Muslim Markazi League	Imtiaz Ali	2,988	2.38	
PPP	Rana Sufyan Mahmood	2,239	1.79	
Others	Others (twenty three candidates)	5,385	4.29	
Turnout		128,012	50.45	
Total valid votes		125,412	97.97	
Rejected ballots		2,600	2.03	
Majority		25,719	20.50	
Registered electors		253,745		
hold				

== General elections 2018 ==
Provincial election 2018: PP-50 Narowal-V
Party	Candidate	Votes	%	±%
PML(N)	Khawaja Muhammad Waseem	61,507	50.07	
PTI	Muhammad Sajjad	44,031	35.85	
TLP	Rana Lal Badshah	11,093	9.03	
Independent	Rana Sufyan Mahmood	2,694	2.19	
Others	Others (four candidates)	3,510	3.31	
Turnout		124,928	56.81	
Total valid votes		122,835	98.33	
Rejected ballots		2,093	1.67	
Majority		17,476	14.22	
Registered electors		219,926		

== General elections 2013 ==
Provincial election 2013: PP-136 Narowal-V
Party	Candidate	Votes	%	±%
PML(N)	Shujah Ahmad Khan	47,475	51.73	
Independent	Muhammad Wakeel Khan Manj	31,423	34.24	
PTI	Muhammad Nadeem Nisar Chaudhary	6,369	6.94	
PPP	Ch. Masood Ahmed Basra	3,384	3.69	
Independent	Shahid Hussain	2,187	2.38	
Others	Others (four candidates)	935	1.02	
Turnout		95,536	60.02	
Total valid votes		91,773	96.06	
Rejected ballots		3,763	3.94	
Majority		16,052	17.49	
Registered electors		159,173		

== General elections 2008 ==
Provincial election 2008: PP-136 Narowal-V
Party	Candidate	Votes	%	±%
PML(Q)	Lt. Col (R) Shujait Ahmed Khan	17,795	24.74	
PML(N)	Abida Raza Saqlain Bukhari	15,786	21.95	
Independent	Ch.Israr ul Haq	15,089	20.98	
PPP	Ch.Masood Ahmed Basara Advocate	13,228	18.39	
Independent	Ch.Tahir Mehmood Advocate	5,644	7.85	
PML(F)	Syed Tassawar ul Hassan Gillani	3,997	5.56	
Others	Others	388	0.54	
Turnout		75,709	58.99	
Total valid votes		71,927	95.00	
Rejected ballots		3,782	5.00	
Majority		2,009	2.79	
Registered electors		128,336		

== See also ==
- PP-56 Narowal-III
- PP-58 Narowal-V
