= Domala =

Domala may refer to:

- Domala, Pakistan, village in Punjab, Pakistan
- MV Domala, ship
