= Nurkot =

Pakistani town

Nurkot نورکوٹ
- Town
- Location within Pakistan
- Coordinates: 32°12′6″N 75°7′7″E
- Country: Pakistan
- Province: Punjab
- District: Narowal
- Tehsil: Shakargarh
- Union Council: UC No.95 Maingri

Area
  - Total: 1.01171 km^{2} (0.39062 sq mi)

Population (2011)
  - Total: 12,876
- Time zone: UTC+5 (PST)
- Postal code span: 51770
- Area code: 0542

Nurkot (also spelled Noorkot, Urdu: نورکوٹ) is a Pakistani town. It is located on the western bank of the Nullah Baein torrent, around 5 km southwest of Shakargarh city in Shakargarh Tehsil, of Narowal District, Punjab, Pakistan, at an elevation of 258 meters,

== History ==
The sixteenth century document Ain-i-Akbari mentions Maingri Pargana of the Rachna Sarkar in the Lahore Subah of Mughal Empire, inhabited by Gujjars and Silhariya, as comprising 62,293 Bigha of agricultural land generating a revenue of 1.475 million Dams, and the local forces consisting of 20 cavalry and 1,000 infantry. The area was later annexed by the Jammu Rajas in early eighteenth century, in 1778 Kanhaiya Sardars took it and in the early nineteenth century it was annexed by Ranjit Singh. The area was then annexed by the British after the Second Anglo-Sikh War in 1849. Later on, Maingri became a Zail of Shakargarh Tehsil.

In 1853, Shakargarh Tehsil of Sialkot District was transferred to Gurdaspur District and it remained an administrative subdivision of Gurdaspur District until Partition in 1947. Under Radcliffe Award, three of the four tehsils of Gurdaspur district on the eastern bank of the Ujh river (which joins the Ravi a little further down) – the tahsils of Gurdaspur, Batala and Pathankot – were awarded to India and only one, Shakargarh, was assigned to Pakistan. After the creation of Pakistan, Shakargarh became a part of Sialkot District once again. In July 1991, two tehsils (Narowal and Shakargarh) were split off from Sialkot District and Shakargarh became a tehsil of the newly formed Narowal District.
