= Chida, Pakistan =

Chida
- Location within Pakistan
- Coordinates: 32.14°N 74.49°E
- Country: Pakistan
- Province: Punjab
- District: Narowal
- Elevation: 242 m (794 ft)
- Time zone: UTC+5 (PST)

Chida is a village in Narowal District of Punjab province, Pakistan. It is located at 32°14'0N 74°49'0E with an altitude of 242 metres (797 feet). Neighbouring settlements include Lala, Qila Sobha Singh and Depoke.
