= 92 News =

Pakistan television news channel

92 News HD ۹۲ نیوز ایچ ڈی
- Country: Pakistan
- Broadcast area: Pakistan, Asia, Middle East, North Africa, Africa, United Kingdom
- Headquarters: Lahore, Punjab, Pakistan

Programming
- Language: Urdu
- Picture format: (1080i 16:9, HDTV, MPEG-4)

Ownership
- Owner: Mian Muhammad Rasheed
- Sister channels: 92 News UK

History
- Launched: 6 February 2015; 11 years ago

Links
- Website: https://92newshd.tv/

Availability

Streaming media
- 92 News HD Live: Watch Live

92 News HD (also known as 92 News HD Plus (Channel 92)) is an Urdu language TV channel based in Lahore, Pakistan. Mian Muhammad Rasheed is the CEO of the channel.

== History ==
The channel's name, 92, is to celebrate the 1992 Cricket World Cup won by Pakistan. The number 92 is also the country calling code of Pakistan, which is another major reason behind the channel's name.

The network has a policy of not having any content that goes against Islam.

92 News HD channel was launched in the year 2015.

== Network and coverage ==
It is Pakistan's first HD television news channel. It has reporters in more than 300 cities of Pakistan (self proclaimed).

The company is using hologram technology and state of the art technology with video library. The channel has coverage in Pakistan, United Kingdom, and European nations.

Farooq Majeed is the director of News Department at 92 News channel.

== Roznama 92 Newspaper ==
Roznama 92 is published by 92 News.

== 92 News UK ==
92 News UK
- Country: United Kingdom
- Broadcast area: United Kingdom, Ireland, Europe
- Headquarters: London, United Kingdom

Programming
- Language: Urdu

Ownership
- Owner: Mian Muhammad Rashid

Links
- Website: www.92newshd.tv

Availability

Streaming media
- 92 News UK Live: Watch Live

92 News UK is an Urdu-English language channel. It is Pakistan's first UK television news channel that was launched on Sky Channel 740 on 12 December 2017.

== See also ==
- List of television stations in Pakistan
- List of news channels in Pakistan
