= Chida =

Chida can refer to the following:

- Chida (surname), a Japanese surname
- Chida, Pakistan, a Pakistani village
- Chaim Yosef David Azulai (1724–1806), also known as the Chida or Hida
