= Sara Suleri Goodyear =

Pakistani-American author and academic (1953–2022)

- Born: Sara Suleri; June 12, 1953; Karachi, Pakistan
- Died: March 20, 2022 (aged 68); Bellingham, Washington, US
- Education: Kinnaird College (BA); Punjab University (MA); Indiana University Bloomington (PhD)
- Occupations: Professor, writer
- Employer: Yale University
- Known for: Founding editor of the Yale Journal of Criticism
- Notable work: Meatless Days
- Spouse: Austin Goodyear (m. 1993; died 2005)
- Father: Z. A. Suleri

Sara Goodyear (née Suleri; June 12, 1953 – March 20, 2022) was a Pakistan-born American author and professor of English at Yale University, where her fields of study and teaching included Romantic and Victorian poetry and an interest in Edmund Burke. Her special concerns included postcolonial literature and theory, contemporary cultural criticism, literature, and law. She was a founding editor of the Yale Journal of Criticism, and served on the editorial boards of YJC, The Yale Review, and Transition.

== Early life and education ==
Suleri was born in Karachi, Dominion of Pakistan (now Pakistan), one of six children, to a Welsh mother, Mair Jones, an English professor, and a Pakistani father, Z. A. Suleri (1913–1999), a notable political journalist, conservative writer, author, and the Pakistan Movement activist regarded as one of the pioneers of print journalism in Pakistan, and authored various history and political books on Pakistan as well as Islam in the Indian subcontinent.

She had her early education in London and attended secondary school in Lahore. She received her B.A. at Kinnaird College, also in Lahore, in 1974. Two years later, she was awarded an M.A. from Punjab University, and went on to graduate with a PhD from Indiana University Bloomington in 1983.

== Career and major works ==
Suleri taught for two years at "Williams College" in Williamstown, Massachusetts, before she moved to Yale and began teaching there in 1983. Suleri was a founding editor of the Yale Journal of Criticism.

Suleri's 1989 memoir, Meatless Days, is an exploration of the complex interweaving of national history and personal biography which was widely and respectfully reviewed. An edition of the book, with an introduction by Kamila Shamsie, was published in the Penguin Women Writers series in 2018.

Her 1992 The Rhetoric of English India was well received in scholarly circles. One critic, for instance, said recent scholarship by Edward Said, Homi Bhabha, Gauri Viswanathan, and Jacques Derrida has "reformulated the paradigmatic assumptions of colonial cultural studies", and the book was an "important addition to such scholarship". The "unconventionality of some of her selections brings a breath of fresh air to a field prone to turn, time and again, to the same weary list of standard texts." However, an historian took Suleri to task for the "casual manner in which she forms important generalizations without benefit of hard data". He concludes, that "This is not to say that Suleri's work is totally without substance or that all of her insights are without value. No doubt, she is a sensitive literary critic who would be bored with the kind of detailed monographs historians and ethnographic anthropologists do as a matter of course."

Boys Will Be Boys: A Daughter's Elegy was published in 2003. The book is a tribute to her father, the political journalist Z. A. Suleri, who was known as Pip for his "patriotic and preposterous disposition". It also incorporates the story of Suleri's marriage to her husband.

Henry Louis Gates Jr. has described Suleri as "a postcolonial Proust to Rushdie's phantasmagorical Pynchon."

== Published works ==
- Meatless Days. Chicago: The University of Chicago Press, 1989, ISBN 978-0-226-77981-2
- The Rhetoric of English India. Chicago: The University of Chicago Press, 1992, ISBN 978-0-226-77983-6
- Boys Will Be Boys: A Daughter's Elegy. Chicago: The University of Chicago Press, 2003, ISBN 978-0-226-30401-4

== Personal life ==
In 1993, Suleri married Austin Goodyear (c. 1920–2005) of the Goodyear family. Goodyear had three children from his first marriage to Louisa Robins (1920–1992), the granddaughter of Thomas Robins Jr; the eldest, Grace Rumsey Goodyear (b. 1941), is married to Franklin D. Roosevelt III (b. 1938), the grandson of Franklin D. Roosevelt and Eleanor Roosevelt.

Suleri and Goodyear remained married until his death on August 14, 2005. Suleri died of chronic obstructive pulmonary disease on March 20, 2022, at her home in Bellingham, Washington, at the age of 68.
