= Pindi Umra =

Village in Narowal District, Punjab, Pakistan

- Village
- Interactive map of Pindi Umra
- Location within Punjab, Pakistan
- Coordinates: 32.31186°N 75.26462°E
- Country: Pakistan
- Province: Punjab
- District: Narowal

Area
  - Total: 0.141 km^{2} (0.054 sq mi)

Population (2017)
  - Total: 697
  - Density: 4,940/km^{2} (12,800/sq mi)

Pindi Umra is a village in Narowal District, Punjab, Pakistan. It is located at coordinates 32.31186°N 75.26462°E. According to the 2017 census, the village had a population of 697. As of 2018, it had 344 male and 302 female registered voters.

== Agriculture ==
Vegetables grown in Pindi Umra, including carrots, garlic, radish and peas, have been the subject of a study examining heavy metal contamination in crops from the Shakargarh region. The study found no significantly elevated levels of heavy metals in produce from the village compared to nearby settlements such as Ikhlas Pur.

== Politics ==
As of the 2018 general election, Pindi Umra had 344 male and 302 female registered voters, for a total of 646 registered voters.
