= PP-55 Narowal-II =

Constituency of the Punjab Assembly

- Constituency for the Provincial Assembly of Punjab
- Region: Shakargarh Tehsil (partly) including Shakargarh city in Narowal District

Current constituency
- Member: Mehmood Ahmad TLP
- Created from: PP-133 Narowal-II (2002-2018); PP-47 Narowal-II (2018-2023)

PP-55 Narowal-II (پی پی-55، نارووال-2) is a Constituency of Provincial Assembly of Punjab.

== General elections 2024 ==
Provincial election 2024: PP-55 Narowal-II
Party	Candidate	Votes	%	±%
TLP	Chaudhry Mehmood Ahmad Sungran	33,494	28.90	
Independent	Arslan Hafeez (Note: Filed nomination papers as PTI candidate but ECP allowed him to run as an Independent)	23,274	20.08	
PML(N)	Muhammad Akmal Sargala	20,826	17.97	
Independent	Chaudhary Liaqat Ali	7,673	6.62	
Independent	Muhammad Nadeem Raheem	7,279	6.28	
Independent	Hafiz Shabbir Ahmad	3,678	3.17	
Pakistan Muslim Markazi League	Zain UI Abidin Yousaf Toor	3,580	3.09	
Independent	Waqar Ahmad Chaudhary	3,201	2.76	
Independent	Abu Hafas Muhammad Ghayas Ud Din	3,057	2.64	
Others	Others (twenty candidates)	9,938	8.49	
Turnout		119,818	48.42	
Total valid votes		116,000	96.81	
Rejected ballots		3,818	3.19	
Majority		10,220	8.82	
Registered electors		247,464		
hold				

== General elections 2018 ==
Provincial election 2018: PP-47 Narowal-II
Party	Candidate	Votes	%	±%
PML(N)	Abu Hafas Muhammad Ghayas Ud Din	18,484	17.77	
PTI	Naimat Ali Javed	13,338	12.82	
Independent	Hafiz Shabbir Ahmad	11,772	11.32	
Independent	Muhammad Akmal Sargala	11,502	11.06	
AAT	Chaudhary Liaqat Ali	9,568	9.20	
Independent	Mehmood Ahmad	7,170	6.89	
Independent	Anwar UI Haq Ch.	6,942	6.67	
TLP	Muhammad Akram	6,840	6.58	
Independent	Waheed Raheem	5,488	5.28	
Independent	Zain Ul Abidin Yousaf Toor	2,762	2.66	
Independent	Muhammad Ejaz Munir	2,718	2.61	
Independent	Asgher Ali Chaudhary	2,199	2.11	
Independent	Khalid Mahmood Ch.	1,713	1.65	
Independent	Shahid Khan	1,247	1.20	
Others	Others (six candidates)	2,278	2.18	
Turnout		109,302	53.39	
Total valid votes		104,021	95.17	
Rejected ballots		5,281	4.83	
Majority		5,146	4.95	
Registered electors		204,715		

== General elections 2013 ==
Provincial election 2013 : PP-133 Narowal-II
Party	Candidate	Votes	%	±%
PML(N)	Abu Hafas Muhammad Ghayas Ud Din	45,473	54.48	
Independent	Naimat Ali Javed	19,529	23.40	
Independent	Safreen Akhtar	8,723	10.45	
PTI	Dr.Gulzar Ahmed Choudary	8,012	9.60	
Others	Others (five candidates)	1,738	2.08	
Turnout		87,023	55.36	
Total valid votes		83,475	95.92	
Rejected ballots		3,548	4.08	
Majority		25,944	31.08	
Registered electors		157,190		

== General elections 2008 ==
Provincial election 2008 : PP-133 Narowal-II
Party	Candidate	Votes	%	±%
PML(Q)	Dr. Tahir Ali Javed	27,508	43.39	
PPP	Muhammad Ghias -ud-Din	16,279	25.68	
PML(N)	Waqar Ahmad Chaudhary	13,704	21.62	
Independent	Daniyal Aziz	5,706	9.00	
Independent	Muhammad Alam Mailu	196	0.31	
Turnout		67,458	51.84	
Total valid votes		63,393	93.97	
Rejected ballots		4,065	6.03	
Majority		11,229	17.71	
Registered electors		130,125		

== See also ==
- PP-54 Narowal-I
- PP-56 Narowal-III
