= Budhaa Pind =

Village in Punjab, Pakistan

Buddha Pind is a village in Narowal District in the province of Punjab in Pakistan. The village has a government boys' middle school.
