= Baddomalhi =

- Town
- Location within Pakistan
- Coordinates: 31.9895°N 74.6605°E
- Country: Pakistan
- Province: Punjab
- District: Narowal
- Tehsil: Narowal
- Elevation: 217 m (712 ft)

Population (2023)
  - Town: 19,351
  - Urban: 19,351 (100%)
  - Rural: N/A
- Time zone: UTC+5 (PST)

Baddomalhi is a town in the Narowal District of the Punjab province of Pakistan. It is located 35 miles northeast of Lahore, at 31°58'60 North 74°40'0 East with an altitude of 217 metres (715 feet).

== Demographics ==
Historical population
Year	Pop.	±% p.a.
1951	...	—
1961	7,773	—
1972	10,112	+2.42%
1981	13,244	+3.04%
1998	15,785	+1.04%
2017	18,249	+0.77%
2023	19,351	+0.98%

According to the 2023 census, it has a population of 19,351.

== Notable people ==
- Mujaddid Ahmed Ijaz
- Naseer Ahmad Malhi
