= Sujowali =

- Village
- Location within Pakistan
- Coordinates: 32.13°N 74.44°E
- Country: Pakistan
- Province: Punjab
- District: Narowal
- Elevation: 236 m (774 ft)
- Time zone: UTC+5 (PST)

Sujowali is a village in Narowal District of the Punjab province of Pakistan. It is located at 32°13'0N 74°44'40E, at an altitude of 236 metres (777 feet). Neighbouring settlements include Qila Sobha Singh, Kalluwali and Basaya.
