= Kanjrur =

Kanjrur is a union council of Shakargar tehsil, Narowal District, Punjab, Pakistan. It is situated on the bank of Basenter torrent (برساتی نالا).

The council is named after a significant Sufi called Kanju peer, whose tomb is in the village, as is the tomb of Baba Mithay shah.

Villages near Kanjrur include Bhilowali, Nangal, Isaharwali, Kapurdeo, Fatehpur, Chhina, Viram, Nawan Pind, Manji Tor, Mian Wali, Jattar and Mallah.

Crops grown in the area include wheat, sugarcane and rice.
