= Sujawal (disambiguation) =

Sujawal is a city in Sindh, Pakistan.

Sujawal may also refer to:

- Sujawal District, an administrative unit of Sindh, Pakistan

== See also ==
- Sujawas, a village in India
- Sujowali, a human settlement in Pakistan
- Sijawal Junejo, a human settlement in Punjab, Pakistan
