= Lagwal Minhasan =

Village in Narowal District, Pakistan

Lagwal Minhasan is a village in Narowal District, Punjab, Pakistan.
