= Malhi (clan) =

Jat clan

- Jat clan
- Location: Pakistan, India
- Language: Punjabi
- Religion: Sikhism, Islam

Malhi (also spelled as Mallhi, Malli) (Punjabi: مَلْہی (Shahmukhi); ਮਲ੍ਹੀ (Gurmukhi)) is a clan of the Jat tribe in the Punjab region of Pakistan and India. They are found mostly in the Sialkot District of Punjab, Pakistan.

== List of notable people ==
- Naseer Ahmad Malhi, Pakistani politician
