= Anwaarul Haq Chaudhary =

Member of the National Assembly of Pakistan from Narowal (2024–2029)

- انوارُ الحق چوہدری

Member of the National Assembly of Pakistan
- Incumbent
- Assumed office 29 February 2024
- Constituency: NA-75 Narowal-I

Personal details
- Party: PMLN (2024-present)

Anwar ul Haq Chaudhry (Urdu: انوارُ الحق چوہدری) is a Pakistani politician from district Narowal who was elected as a member of the National Assembly of Pakistan in February 2024. He is also serving as Federal Parliamentary Secretary Kashmir Affairs & Gilgit/Baltistan since 2024.

== Political career ==
Anwar ul haq Chaudhry won the 2024 Pakistani general election from NA-75 Narowal-I as a Pakistan Muslim League (N) candidate. He received 99,625 votes while runner up Independent (PTI - Pakistan Tehreek-e-Insaf) supported candidate Tahir Ali Javed received 75,626 votes. Daniyal Aziz came in 3rd position with 50,984 votes.

Anwar ul haq Chaudhry was first elected as member of Punjab Assembly from Shakargarh in 1977. He also served as member of National Assembly from Narowal in 1988.
