= Talwandi Bhindran =

Pakistani town

Talwandi Bhindran تلونڈی بھنڈراں
- City
- Talwandi Bhindran
- Interactive map of Talwandi Bhindran
- Country: Pakistan
- Province: Punjab
- District: Narowal District

Population
- 13,000
- Time zone: UTC+5 (PST)
- Postal code span: 51570
- Area code: 0542
- Website: http://www.talwandibhindran.blogspot.com

Talwandi Bhindran (Urdu:تلونڈی بھنڈراں) is a town and Union Council in the northeast of the Narowal District, in Punjab, Pakistan. The town is located 16 km away from Narowal on Narowal-Lahore road. Major population is punjabi speaking with other languages such as Mewati and farming as major occupation . It lies on the bank of canal link head Marala.
