= MV Dumana =

British merchant ship and Second World War depot ship

History

United Kingdom
- Name: 1921: Melma; 1921: Dumana
- Owner: British India SN Co
- Port of registry: Glasgow
- Route: 1923: London – Suez Canal – Bombay; 1933: London – Suez Canal – Calcutta
- Builder: Barclay, Curle & Co, Whiteinch
- Yard number: 593
- Launched: 21 November 1921
- Completed: 16 March 1923
- Refit: 1939
- Identification: UK official number 146327; until 1933: code letters KNQW; by 1930: call sign GDNF
- Fate: Sunk by torpedo, 1943

General characteristics
- Type: 1923: cargo liner; 1939: depot ship; 1942: flying boat tender
- Tonnage: 8,427 GRT, 5,122 NRT, 10,400 DWT
- Length: 464.0 ft (141.4 m) overall; 450.0 ft (137.2 m) registered
- Beam: 58.3 ft (17.8 m)
- Draught: 27 ft 11 in (8.51 m)
- Depth: 32.9 ft (10.0 m)
- Decks: 2
- Installed power: 1923: 963 NHP; 1927: 1,110 NHP
- Propulsion: 2 × 4-stroke diesel engines; 2 × screws
- Speed: 13.6 knots (25.2 km/h)
- Capacity: 1923: 1st & 2nd class passengers; 1928: 111 in one class; 1934: 140 in one class
- Troops: in the Second World War: 500
- Complement: in the Second World War: 139 crew + 21 RAF personnel + 9 DEMS gunners
- Sensors & processing systems: by 1927: wireless direction finding
- Armament: in the Second World War: 1 × 4-inch gun; 1 × 12-pounder gun; 4 × Oerlikon 20 mm cannon; 4 × machine guns
- Notes: sister ship: Domala

MV Dumana was a British cargo liner that was laid down as Melma, but launched in 1921 as Dumana. The British India Steam Navigation Company (BI) owned her, and ran her on routes between London and India.

In 1939 she was chartered and refitted as a depot ship. She served the Fleet Air Arm until 1940, and then the Royal Air Force. From 1942 she was a flying boat tender. A U-boat sank her in 1943 with the loss of 39 lives.

== Building ==
In 1920 Barclay, Curle & Co of Whiteinch, Glasgow, launched the first major ocean-going passenger ship to be built in the United Kingdom as a motor ship. She was built as yard number 579, launched as Magvana, but renamed Domala before she was completed. Her design was similar to the "M" class steamships that Barclay, Curle had been building for BI since 1913, but with diesel engines instead of steam, and electric winches instead of steam. BI at first gave her a name beginning with "M" to group her with the "M" class, but changed it to a name beginning with "D" to distinguish her as a diesel-powered ship.

Domala was completed on 14 December 1921, almost a year after she was launched. Three weeks before that, on 21 November, Barclay, Curle launched her sister ship. Yard number 593 was laid down as Melma, but launched as Dumana. Again, BI changed her to a name beginning with "D" to distinguish her diesel propulsion.

Dumana's dimensions were the same as Domala and the earlier "M" class steamships. Her lengths were 464.0 ft (141.4 m) overall and 450.0 ft (137.2 m) registered, her beam was 58.3 ft (17.8 m), her depth was 32.9 ft (10.0 m) and her draught was 27 ft 11 in (8.51 m). Her tonnages were 8,427 GRT, 5,122 NRT, and 10,400 DWT.

Dumana had a straight stem, counter stern, one funnel, and two masts. As built, she had first and second class accommodation for passengers. There is some uncertainty about numbers: she had berths for either 60 in first class and 77 in second class, or 83 in first class and 47 in second class.

Like her sister, Dumana had a pair of single-acting four-stroke diesel engines, built by the North British Diesel Engine Works. As built, the combined power output of the twin engines was rated at 963 NHP. She made 13.6 knots (25.2 km/h) on her sea trials. By 1927 her engines had been re-rated to a combined total of 1,110 NHP.

Unlike her sister, Dumana had steam-powered winches on deck. A boiler heated by exhaust gas supplied the steam. By 1927 her navigation equipment included wireless direction finding.

BI registered Dumana at Glasgow. Her United Kingdom official number was 146327 and her code letters were KNQW. By 1930 her call sign was GDNF. By 1934 this had superseded her code letters.

== Civilian service ==
BI put Dumana on its service between London and Bombay (now Mumbai, India, via the Suez Canal and Karachi. By 1929 BI's usual ports of call on this route were Plymouth, Port Said, Suez, and Aden.

In 1928 Dumana was converted into a one-class ship, with berths for 111 passengers. In 1933 BI transferred her to its service between London and Calcutta. BI's regular ports of call on this route were Gibraltar, Marseille, Port Said, Suez, Aden, Colombo, and Madras (now Chennai). In 1934 her passenger accommodation was increased to 140 passengers, still all in one class. By 1937, BI's ports of call between London and Calcutta were Tangier, Marseille, Valetta, Port Said, Suez, Aden, Colombo and Madras.

On 25 January 1935, when Dumana was in port in Marseille, fire broke out in a cargo of jute in her number 4 hold. The fire was contained by flooding the hold.

Dumana had limited refrigeration capacity. Originally it was 1,000 cubic feet (28 cubic metres). By 1936 this had been increased to 7,110 cubic feet (201 cubic metres).

== War service ==
On 24 April 1939 Dumana was chartered as a depot ship. Sources disagree as to whether at first the Admiralty chartered her for the Royal Navy, the Ministry of Shipping (later the Ministry of War Transport) chartered her for the Air Ministry, or the Air Ministry chartered directly. She was refitted with aircraft overhaul workshops, a troop deck for 500 men, and a galley, bakery and recreation room to cater for them.

She was allocated to Mediterranean Air Command. On 5 May 1939, in London, the headquarters of the No. 86 (General Reconnaissance) Wing RAF reformed aboard her. Fleet Air Arm units also embarked on her. On 10 May 1939 she left London. On 19 May she called at Grand Harbour, Valetta, where the FAA units disembarked. On 2 June she reached Alexandria, Egypt. On 10 October the headquarters of No. 86 Wing disembarked at Aboukir. On 12 October 1939 the headquarters of No. 86 Wing re-embarked with 802 Naval Air Squadron. On 2 December she reached Marsaxlokk, Malta, where 802 Squadron disembarked. She reached Grand Harbour on 4 December, and left on 14 December for Gibraltar.

In 1941 Dumana evacuated RAF personnel from Crete after German forces invaded the island. In 1942 she was converted into a base ship for Short Sunderland flying boats, and stationed at Bathurst (now Banjul), Gambia with two RAF squadrons. She was later transferred to Port-Étienne (now Nouadhibou), Mauritania.

== Loss ==
Late in 1943 Domana left Port-Étienne carrying 300 tons of RAF stores to deliver to ports between there and Takoradi, Gold Coast, including a call at Marshall, Liberia. Her Master was Captain Otto West. She carried a crew of 36 Europeans, 103 lascars, 21 RAF maintenance personnel, and nine DEMS gunners. By then her armament was one four-inch gun, one 12-pounder gun, four Oerlikon 20 mm cannons and four machine guns.

At Freetown, Sierra Leone, Domana joined Convoy STL 8, which was going to Lagos, Nigeria. However, she and two escorts, the naval trawlers HMS Arran and Southern Pride, lost contact with the rest of the convoy.

Position where U-515 sank Dumana

On the night of 24 December 1943 the trio were off Ivory Coast, sailing at 8 1/2 knots (16 km/h), when U-515 attacked them. Despite warnings of U-boats in the area, the ships were not steering an evasive course, and Domana had not deployed her torpedo nets. At 21:18 hrs the U-boat fired a G7es torpedo at one of the trawlers. It missed, and the trawler's crew failed to notice it. At 21:37 U-515 fired three torpedoes, two of which hit Domana's starboard side in her numbers 2 and 3 holds. The explosions destroyed the starboard wing of her bridge, two of her starboard lifeboats, and many of the wooden ladders in her troop accommodation. Her engines survived intact, but her generators soon failed, shutting down all lighting and communication. The ship began to list to port.

Domana's crew launched numbers 2, 6, and 8 lifeboats on her port side. They also launched number 5 lifeboat on her starboard side, but wreckage in the water capsized it. The ship's increasing list caused temporary wooden superstructures on her shade deck to become detached and slide overboard, hitting some of the lifeboats alongside, and killing some of their occupants. Within seven minutes Domana sank by her bow at position 04°27′N 06°58′W.

Domana dragged some of her lifeboats underwater as she sank. Only her motor boat floated free. 40 survivors climbed into it. Arran rescued Captain West and about 60 other survivors, as Southern Pride provided a defensive screen. Survivors who were in boats or clinging to wreckage were left until the next day, Christmas Day, when the rescue resumed at first light, around 06:30 hrs. Both trawlers searched the area until 11:30 hrs, when they left for either Takoradi or Sassandra (accounts differ). 13 European crew, 17 lascars, seven RAF personnel and two DEMS gunners were killed.

== Monuments ==
Six unidentified bodies were washed up on a beach at Sassandra in Ivory Coast, and were buried in Imperial War Graves Commission plot at Sassandra Municipal Cemetery, marked by a standard IWGC headstone with a Merchant Navy inscription. A year after the sinking, the Free French erected a monument to the dead in Sassandra. The Governor, André Latrille, dedicated it on 29 December 1944.

The 13 European members of Domana's crew who were killed are commemorated on panel 36 of the Second World War monument at Tower Hill Memorial. The 17 lascars are commemorated on a roll of honour, one copy of which is held at Chittagong War Cemetery in Bangladesh, and the other at the Indian Seamen's Home at Mumbai in India. The seven RAF members are commemorated on the Air Forces Memorial at Englefield Green, England.

== Bibliography ==
- Haws, Duncan (1987). British India S.N. Co. Merchant Fleets. Vol. 11. Burwash: Travel Creatours Ltd Publications. ISBN 0-946378-07-X.
- Lloyd's Register of Shipping. Vol. II.–Steamers and Motor Vessels. London: Lloyd's Register of Shipping. 1923 – via Internet Archive.
- Lloyd's Register of Shipping. Vol. II.–Steamers and Motorships. London: Lloyd's Register of Shipping. 1924 – via Internet Archive.
- Lloyd's Register of Shipping. Vol. II.–Steamers and Motorships. London: Lloyd's Register of Shipping. 1927 – via Internet Archive.
- Lloyd's Register of Shipping (PDF). Vol. I.–Steamers and Motorships under 300 tons. Trawlers, tugs, dredgers, &c. Sailing vessels, shipowners, &c. London: Lloyd's Register of Shipping. 1930 – via Southampton City Council.
- Lloyd's Register of Shipping (PDF). Vol. II.–Steamers and Motorships of 300 tons gross and over. London: Lloyd's Register of Shipping. 1934 – via Southampton City Council.
- Lloyd's Register of Shipping (PDF). Vol. I.–Steamers and Motorships under 300 tons. Trawlers, tugs, dredgers, &c. Sailing vessels, shipowners, &c. London: Lloyd's Register of Shipping. 1936 – via Southampton City Council.
- Mercantile Navy List. London: Crew List Index Project. 1924.
- Mercantile Navy List. London: Crew List Index Project. 1930.
- Mulligan, Timothy P (1993). Lone Wolf: The Life and Death of U-Boat Ace Werner Henke. Greenwood Publishing Group. ISBN 978-0275936778.
- Sturtivant, Ray; Hamlin, John (2007). RAF Flying Training, and Support Units since 1912. Tonbridge: Air-Britain. ISBN 978-0851303659.
