= Dudhu Chak =

- Nickname: Land of Pleasure
- Location within Pakistan
- Coordinates: 32°16′0″N 75°10′0″E
- Country: Pakistan
- Province: Punjab
- District: Narowal District
- Established: Since 1947
- Incorporated: Since 1947

Government
  - Founded By: Haji Allaha Rakha (Late)

Area
  - Total: 1.5 km^{2} (0.58 sq mi)

Population (2006)
  - Total: 20,000
- Time zone: UTC+5 (PST)
- Postal code span: 51810
- Area code: 0542
- Website: www.dudhuchak.com/

Dudhu Chak (Punjabi, Urdu: دودہوچک) is a town in Shakargarh Tehsil, in the northeast of Narowal District, Punjab, Pakistan. The town is situated at the west bank of the River Ravi. It is famously known that Guru Nanak visited this place in his youth.

== Popular schools, colleges and academies ==
=== Colleges ===
- Sultan Memorial Public Model School and College, Dudhu Chak
- Tabinda Public Model School and College, Dudhu Chak

=== Schools ===
- Govt. Primary School, Dudhu Chak
- Govt. Islamia High Schools for Boys, Dudhu Chak
- Govt. Islamia High Schools for Girls, Dudhu Chak
- Atique Academy Dudhu Chak
- Pacific Academy Dudhu Chak
- Sultan Memorial Public Model School, Dudhu Chak
- Tabinda Public Model School, Dudhu Chak
- Al-Aziz Public High School, Dudhu Chak
- Al-Fatima Academy, Dudhu Chak
- Al-Raza Science Academy
- New Trend Science Academy, Dudhu Chak
