= MV Domala =

British merchant ship sunk in the Second World War

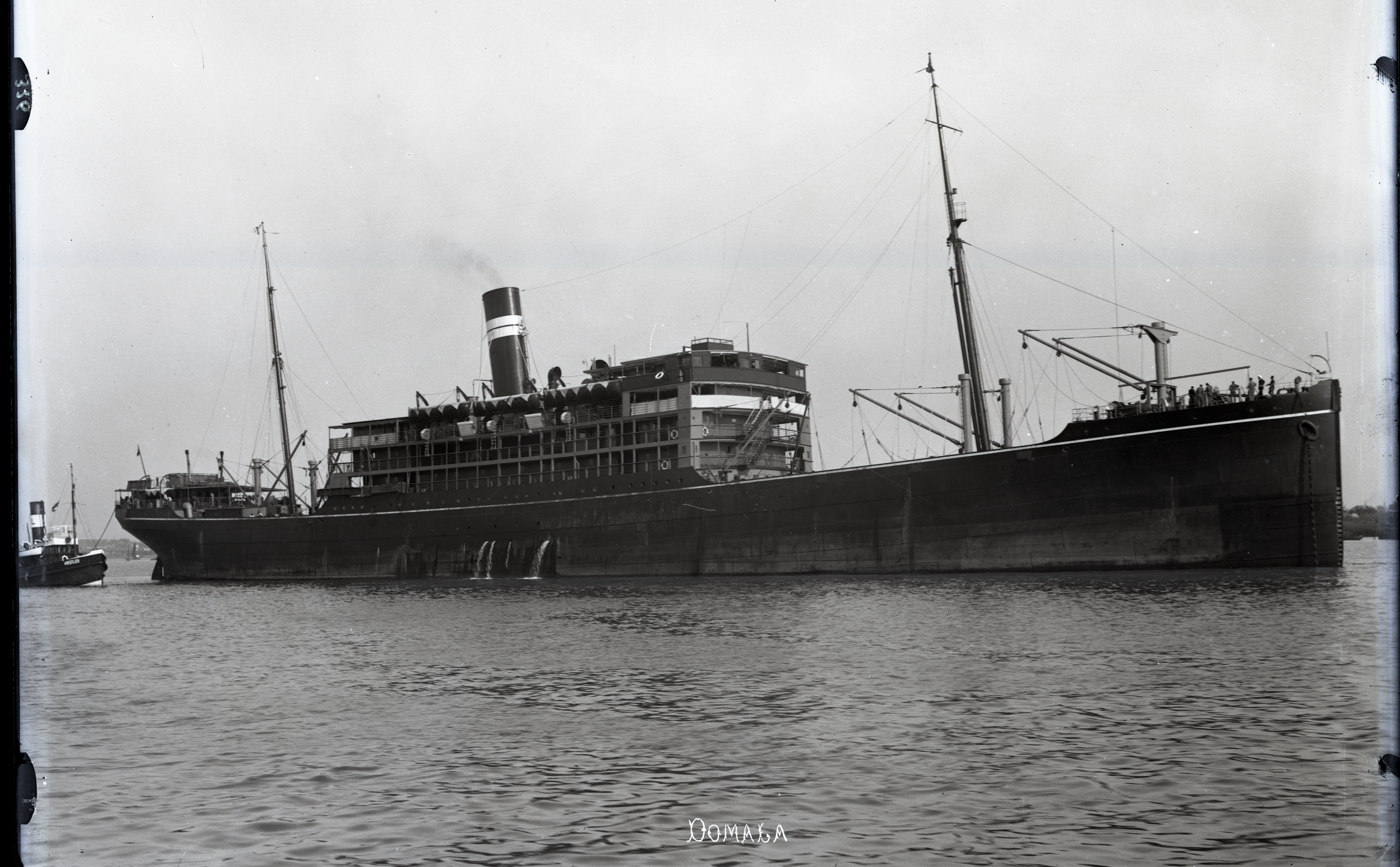
- Domala

History

United Kingdom
- Name: 1920: Magvana; 1921: Domala; 1940: Empire Attendant
- Namesake: Domala, Punjab
- Owner: 1921: British India SN Co; 1940: Ministry of Shipping; 1941: Ministry of War Transport
- Operator: 1941: Andrew Weir & Co
- Port of registry: Glasgow
- Route: London – Suez Canal – Calcutta
- Builder: Barclay, Curle & Co, Whiteinch
- Yard number: 579
- Launched: 23 December 1920
- Completed: 14 December 1921
- Identification: UK official number 146266; until 1933: code letters KLFG; by 1930: call sign GDMV
- Fate: Sunk near Río de Oro, 15 July 1942

General characteristics
- Type: 1921: cargo liner; 1941: cargo ship
- Tonnage: 1922: 8,551 GRT, 5,134 NRT, 10,400 DWT; 1941: 7,524 GRT, 4,529 NRT
- Length: 464.0 ft (141.4 m) overall; 450.0 ft (137.2 m) registered
- Beam: 58.3 ft (17.8 m)
- Draught: 1922: 27 ft 11 in (8.51 m); 1941: 27 ft 5 3/4 in (8.38 m)
- Depth: 32.9 ft (10.0 m)
- Decks: 2
- Installed power: 1922: 963 NHP; 1927: 1,085 NHP
- Propulsion: 2 × 4-stroke diesel engines; 2 × screws
- Speed: 13.6 knots (25.2 km/h)
- Capacity: cargo: 516,000 cubic feet (14,611 m^{3}); passengers: 1921: 100 × 1st + 50 × 2nd class; 1928: 111 in one class; 1934: 140 in one class
- Crew: 1921: 140; 1942: 50 crew + 9 DEMS gunners
- Sensors & processing systems: as built: submarine signalling; by 1927: wireless direction finding
- Notes: sister ship: Dumana

MV Domala was a British cargo liner that was launched in 1920 as Magvana, but completed in 1921 as Domala. She was the first major ocean-going passenger ship to be built in the United Kingdom as a motor ship.

The British India Steam Navigation Company (BI) owned and operated her until 1940, when she was bombed by a German aircraft and burnt out. She was rebuilt for the Ministry of Shipping (MoS) as the cargo ship Empire Attendant. Andrew Weir & Company managed her for the MoS, and for its successor the Ministry of War Transport (MoWT), until a U-boat sank her with all hands in 1942.

== Context ==
In the First World War, BI lost four nearly new "M" class twin-screw cargo liners to enemy action. After the war it ordered replacements: three to the same dimensions from Barclay, Curle & Company in Whiteinch, Glasgow, and one, 20 feet (6 m) longer overall (about 16 feet (5 m) longer registered) but otherwise similar, from Swan, Hunter and Wigham Richardson at Wallsend, Tyneside.

Barclay, Curle launched yard number 577 in July 1920 as Mashobra, and completed her that October with a pair of triple expansion engines like her predecessors. It launched yard number 580 in October 1920 as Manela, and completed her in May 1921 with two sets of three-stage Brown-Curtis steam turbines. It launched yard number 579 in December 1920 as Megvana, and completed her on 14 December 1921. Her engines were a pair of single-acting four-stroke diesels, built by the North British Diesel Engine Works. In order to distinguish her as a motor ship, BI renamed Megvana as Domala before she was completed; giving a name beginning with "D" to distinguish her as a diesel ship.

Swan, Hunter and Wigham Richardson launched Modasa on 24 December 1920: the same day as Barclay, Curle launched Megvana. Modasa was completed in December 1921 with Metrovick-Rateau steam turbines.

Domala's diesel engines obviated the need for 40 stokers, but her diesel blast injector compressors gave continual trouble. She did not make her sea trials until 24 November 1921. She was delivered to BI that December. BI ordered only one diesel sister ship for Domala. Barclay, Curle built her as yard number 593. She was laid down as Melma, and launched in November 1921. BI renamed her Dumana before she was completed, which was not until March 1923. By contrast, BI ordered five more "M" class turbine steamships, all to the same increased length as Modasa, which were delivered in 1921 and 1922.

== Description ==
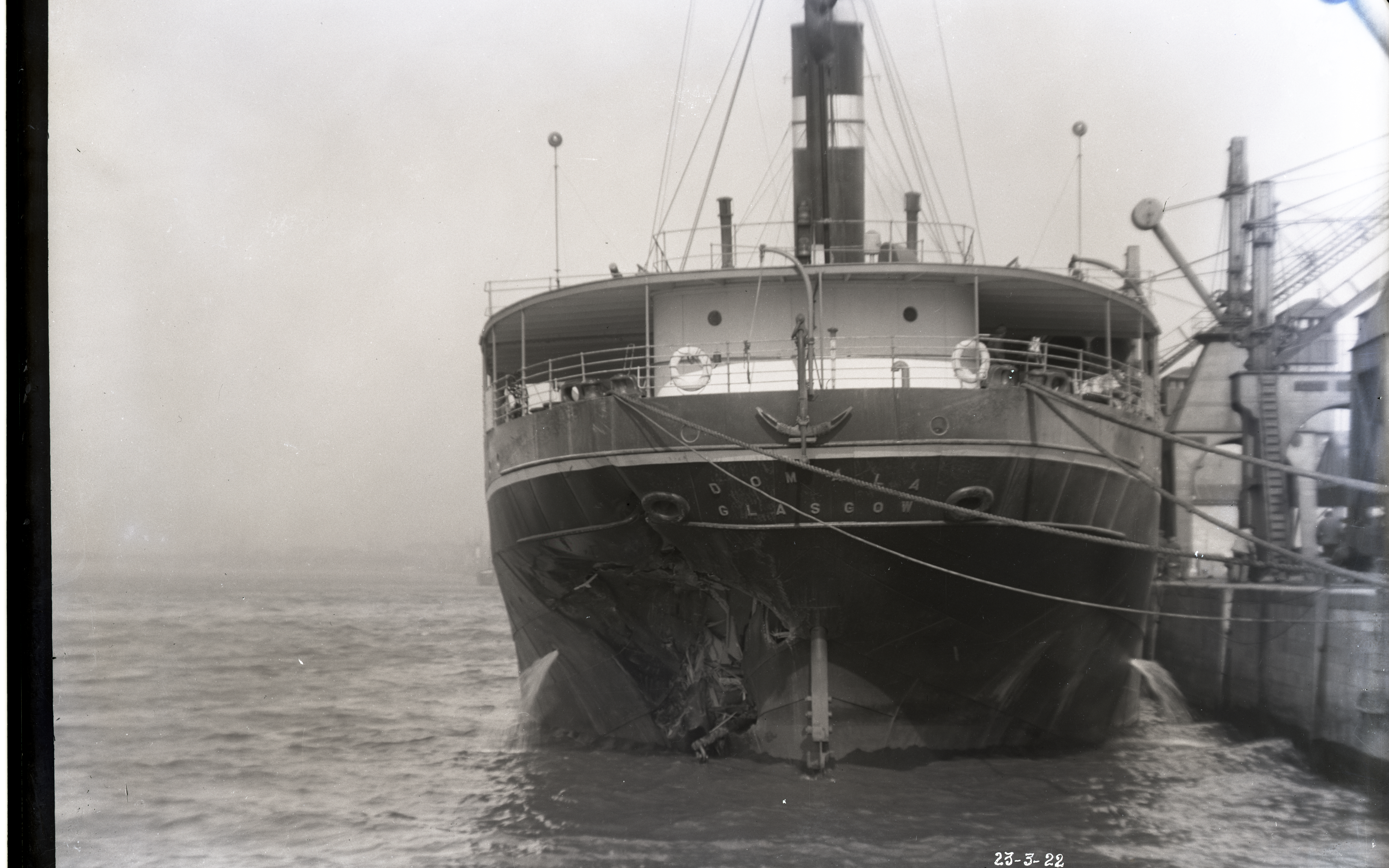
Domala from astern

Domala's lengths were 464.0 ft (141.4 m) overall and 450.0 ft (137.2 m) registered. Her beam was 58.3 ft (17.8 m), and her depth was 32.9 ft (10.0 m). She had a straight stem, counter stern, one funnel, and two masts. Her holds had capacity for 516,000 cubic feet (14,611 m^{3}) of cargo, and all her winches were electric. As built, her tonnages were 8,551 GRT, 5,134 NRT, and 10,400 DWT, and her draught was 27 ft 11 in (8.51 m). She had berths 100 passengers in first class and 50 in second class, and carried a crew of 140.

As built, the combined power output of Domala's twin diesel engines was rated at 963 NHP. She made 13.6 knots (25.2 km/h) on her sea trials. By 1927 her engines had been re-rated to a combined total of 1,085 NHP. Her cruising speed was 13 knots (24 km/h). Her bunkers had capacity for 702 tons of oil, and she consumed 20 tons per day.

As built, Domala's navigation equipment included submarine signalling. By 1927 it also included wireless direction finding.

BI registered Domala at Glasgow. Her United Kingdom official number was 146266 and her code letters were KLFG. By 1930 her wireless telegraph call sign was GDMV. By 1934 this had superseded her code letters.

== Peacetime career ==
Domala began her maiden voyage on 30 December 1921, reaching Bombay (now Mumbai), India on 27 January 1922. She returned via Karachi. On 23 May 1922 she was going up the Scheldt to Antwerp when a ship called Pallas rammed her stern. Pallas had an icebreaker bow, which cut into Domala's hull down to below the waterline. Domala reached her berth in Antwerp, but was out of service for repairs for the rest of the year.

Domala's regular route was between London and Calcutta via the Suez Canal. BI's regular ports of call on this route were Gibraltar, Marseille, Port Said, Suez, Aden, Colombo, and Madras (now Chennai).

On 6 October 1927 Domala collided with the British cargo steamship Sagama River in the Humber, severely damaging her. By 1928 Domala's passenger accommodation had been reconfigured. She was now a one-class ship, with berths for 111 passengers. By 1934 this had been increased to 140 passengers, but remaining a one-class ship. On 12 August 1934 she rammed the stern of a Thames sailing barge, Shannon, at Erith, Kent.

== Air attack ==
On 17 February 1940 Domala was requisitioned for the Liner Division. She went to Antwerp, where she embarked a party of lascars whom Germany had released from internment, and left for Southampton.

On 2 March 1940 a Heinkel He 111H of Kampfgeschwader 26, flown by Martin Harlinghausen, attacked Domala off St Catherine's Point on the Isle of Wight. The bomber dropped two sticks of bombs, setting the ship on fire. As the crew and passengers abandoned ship, the bomber machine-gunned her. A total of 108 people were killed, including 81 lascars. This provoked public anger in India against Germany.

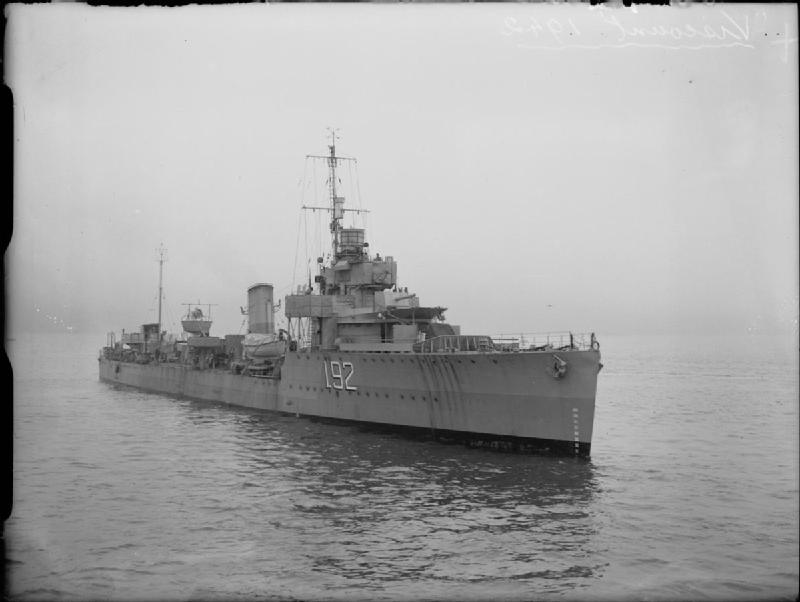
The destroyer HMS Viscount, which aided Domala after she was bombed and set on fire

The Dutch steamship Jong Willem rescued 50 survivors, aided by the destroyer HMS Viscount, and Avro Anson aircraft of 48 Squadron. On fire, Domala was towed to the Solent, where she was beached between Hurst Castle and The Needles on 6 March. She was refloated on 15 March, and on 19 March she was towed to Southampton.

Surgeon Lieutenant MacDonald was mentioned in dispatches for his zeal and devotion to duty, and skill in attending the wounded. Domala's Chief Officer, William Brawn, and a Cadet, Bernard John Duval, were awarded the King's Commendation for Brave Conduct. Lloyd's of London awarded Duval Lloyd's War Medal for Bravery at Sea; The citation reads: "The ship was attacked during darkness by an enemy aircraft, which dropped a bomb, putting the main engines out of action and setting her on fire. She also carried a number of lascars captured from various vessels by an enemy raider, who were being taken home. Many were hurt and some killed. At great risk to himself, Cadet Duval, a lad of seventeen, gave a fine example of bravery, doing all he could to save his second officer's life".

On 6 March, Manny Shinwell MP asked in the House of Commons why Domala did not use her DEMS guns to defend herself. The First Lord of the Admiralty, Winston Churchill, replied that the aircraft that attacked Domala had at first been misidentified as an Allied one, so the guns were not manned, and a Royal Navy destroyer also misidentified the aircraft. Shinwell then asked why the gunners were not always manning the guns. Churchill replied that he was not sure that this would be physically possible.

== Empire Attendant ==
The Ministry of Shipping (MoS) requisitioned Domala, had her rebuilt as a cargo ship, and renamed her Empire Attendant. The rebuild reduced her tonnages to 7,524 GRT and 4,529 NRT, and her draught to 27 ft 5 3/4 in (8.38 m). The MoS contracted Andrew Weir & Company to manage her.

In 1940 Empire Attendant sailed in Convoy HX 98, which left Halifax, Nova Scotia on 22 December and reached Sydney, Cape Breton on 29 December. Her cargo was steel. In 1941 she sailed in Convoy HX 120, which left Halifax on 10 April and reached Liverpool on 29 April. Her cargo was steel, plus 350 tons of explosives. She was bound for the Firth of Clyde, and Middlesbrough. In May 1941 the Ministry of War Transport succeeded the MoS.

Position where U-582 sank Empire Attendant

In 1942 Empire Attendant left Liverpool for Karachi via Durban. Her Master was Captain Thomas Grundy. She carried a crew of 49, plus nine DEMS gunners. Her cargo was stores, vehicles, and explosives.

She sailed in Convoy OS 33, which left Liverpool on 1 July, and was meant to take her as far as Freetown, Sierra Leone. However, she repeatedly broke down. At 1645 hrs on 10 July she broke down for the seventh time, and the sloop HMS Pelican signalled to the Admiralty that by sunset Domala was not within 20 nautical miles (37 km) of the convoy.

At 03:30 hrs CET on 15 July, Empire Attendant was off the coast of Río de Oro, Spanish Sahara, when U-582 sank her by torpedo at position 23°48′N 21°51′W. There were no survivors.

Empire Attendant's crew is commemorated on panel 38 of the Second World War monument at Tower Hill Memorial.

== Bibliography ==
- Griffiths, Denis (July 1997). "British Marine Industry and the Diesel Engine" (PDF). The Northern Mariner. VII (3). Canadian Nautical Research Society.
- Haws, Duncan (1987). British India S.N. Co. Merchant Fleets. Vol. 11. Burwash: Travel Creatours Ltd Publications. ISBN 0-946378-07-X.
- Hooton, Edward (1994). Phoenix Triumphant: The Rise and Rise of the Luftwaffe. London: Arms & Armour. ISBN 978-1-85409-181-9.
- Lloyd's Register of Shipping. Vol. II.–Steamers and Motor Vessels. London: Lloyd's Register of Shipping. 1922 – via Internet Archive.
- Lloyd's Register of Shipping. Vol. II.–Steamers and Motorships. London: Lloyd's Register of Shipping. 1926 – via Internet Archive.
- Lloyd's Register of Shipping. Vol. II.–Steamers and Motorships. London: Lloyd's Register of Shipping. 1927 – via Internet Archive.
- Lloyd's Register of Shipping (PDF). Vol. II.–Steamers and Motorships of 300 tons gross and over. London: Lloyd's Register of Shipping. 1934 – via Southampton City Council.
- Lloyd's Register of Shipping (PDF). Vol. II.–Steamers and Motorships of 300 tons gross and over. London: Lloyd's Register of Shipping. 1941 – via Southampton City Council.
- Mercantile Navy List. London. 1923 – via Crew List Index Project.
- Mercantile Navy List. London. 1930 – via Crew List Index Project.
- Mitchell, WH; Sawyer, LA (1990). The Empire Ships. London, New York, Hamburg, Hong Kong: Lloyd's of London Press. ISBN 1-85044-275-4.
- Thompson, HL (1953). New Zealanders with the Royal Air Force. Vol. 1: European Theatre, September 1939-December 1942. Wellington: War History Branch – via Victoria University of Wellington.
