= Baein =

- Location within Pakistan Location within India

Physical characteristics
- Source
  - coordinates: 32.5431715°N 75.35255°E
- Mouth
  - coordinates: 32.0708624°N 74.9964116°E

Basin features
- River system: Ravi River

The Baein (also spelled Bein, Urdu: نالہ بئیں) is a large sandy river which rises in Jammu to the north of Shakargarh Tehsil of Pakistan and running through the centre of the tehsil falls into the Ravi. It is formed by the combined waters of the Tarnah and Bhabban. It is joined by the Hodla at Khanna and by the Dehr at Saroch. The bed is in places over a mile wide and is composed of deep sand through which in the cold weather only a shallow narrow stream of water flows. But owing to its rapid slope it is liable in the rains to sudden and violent floods which cause frequent loss of life.
