= Naseer Ahmad Malhi =

Pakistani politician (1911 – 1991)

- Naseer Ahmad Malhi

(Pakistan) Minister for Law, Education & Parliamentary Affairs

Personal details
- Born: 15 August 1911 Baddomalhi, Sialkot District, British India
- Died: 12 July 1991 (aged 79) Baddomalhi, Narowal, Pakistan
- Party: Muslim League
- Spouse: Shamim Akhtar
- Children: Afzaal Malhi; Sheraza Malhi; Fayyaz Malhi; Tanweer Malhi
- Education: University of the Punjab
- Profession: Politician; Pakistan Movement activist

Naseer Ahmad Malhi (Urdu: چودھری نصیر احمد ملہی) (15 August 1911 – 12 July 1991) was a Pakistani politician, known for playing a pivotal role in the formation of the Islamic Republic of Pakistan. Malhi is recognised as one of the activists of the Pakistan Movement.

Malhi was a leading member of the All-India Muslim League and was at the forefront of the Pakistan Movement. A lifelong member of the Muslim League, he belonged to the gentry of Punjab and served as West Pakistan's first Minister of Education.

Lord Malhi also led Pakistan's delegation to the United Nations General Assembly in 1955.

== Family background ==
Naseer Ahmad Malhi was born as the second son of Chaudhry Ghulam Haider Malhi, in 1911, in the town of Baddomalhi, in Sialkot district into the Malhi clan of the Jutt tribe. Malhi's father was the leading land-owning farmer of the district, one of the elites of Punjab, was noted for his philanthropy, and was decorated by the British Governor for his services to the community. Malhi's great-grandfather, Chaudhry Ali Gohar Malhi, served as Governor of Punjab during the reign of Maharaja Ranjit Singh who ruled Punjab from 1801 to 1839.

== Education ==
Naseer Ahmad Malhi received his primary and secondary education at G.H. (Ghulam Haider) Muslim High School, named after his father, who was encouraged by Sir Syed Ahmad Khan to found this school in 1898, to educate aspiring students. The school was noted for offering free tuition and books to economically disadvantaged pupils. The educational expenses of these students were borne by Malhi's father.

After his secondary education, Malhi went on to earn a Bachelor of Arts (BA) degree in mathematics and Arabic from Government College Lahore (GCU) and a Bachelor of Laws (LLB) from the University of the Punjab, Lahore.

== Political career ==
=== Pre-independence ===
Malhi commenced his political career with the Congress Party. After attending the 1940 Lahore Conference held by the All India Muslim League, he recognised the immense potential that the Muslim League had for representing the Muslims of India. He joined the Muslim League's Sialkot chapter and rapidly ascended to become its president.

In 1943, Malhi met Muhammad Ali Jinnah at Jinnah Mansion on Malabar Hill, Bombay. It was on Malhi's advice that what became the historic Sialkot Convention was planned by the All-India Muslim League for Punjab. Held in Sialkot city in May 1944, this convention was attended by Jinnah, Liaquat Ali Khan, Khawaja Nazimuddin, Muhammad Zafarullah Khan, Sardar Abdur Rab Nishtar, Sardar Shaukat Hayat Khan, Mumtaz Daultana, Maulvi Tamizuddin Khan, Iftikhar Hussain Khan Mamdot and Mian Iftikharuddin among other Muslim League leaders.

The Sialkot Convention in May 1944 was a milestone in Muslim–Hindu politics. It is widely regarded by Pakistani historians as the landmark event which brought the Muslim League into prominence in undivided Punjab. It broke the Unionist Party's hold over the Muslims of Punjab and swayed their sentiments towards the Muslim League and the Pakistan movement, paving the way for the eventual formation of Pakistan.

Realizing the convention's impact, Jinnah reportedly stated, "I have a feeling today, that Pakistan has come into existence". Jinnah attributed the success of this convention to Malhi. Embracing him, he reportedly commented, "Mr. Malhi, no doubt, you are Lord Malhi". Jinnah made Malhi the head of the Muslim League of Punjab, a post that Malhi maintained until 1971.

=== Post-independence ===
After the independence of Pakistan, Lord Malhi served as Pakistan's:

-  Minister of Education
-  Minister of Law
-  Minister of Prisons
-  Minister of Planning
-  Minister of Parliamentary Affairs

It was during his tenure as Minister of Education that school uniforms were introduced in Pakistan. He excluded Aitchison College from the list of schools receiving government assistance on the rationale that such elite institutions did not require federal aid.

Greeting Mrs Roosevelt at dinner hosted as Pakistan's Ambassador to the UN.

Chaudhry Naseer Malhi led Pakistan's delegation at the Geneva Conference in 1955. At this conference he delivered a speech defending the rights of Afro-Asian countries and was awarded a gold medal. Following this success, Malhi led Pakistan's delegation to the United Nations, where he addressed the United Nations General Assembly on the political challenges facing South Asia.

In his efforts to elevate Pakistan's image, Malhi hosted an historic dinner for Eleanor Roosevelt, President of the United Nations General Assembly and former First Lady of the United States.

With the advent of martial law in the early sixties, Malhi became a vociferous opponent of the government of General Ayub Khan. In 1965, he allied himself with and supported Fatima Jinnah in her bid to democratically dislodge Ayub Khan from his assumed office.

Malhi was offered key ministry posts during the Nawab of Kalabagh's tenure as Chief Minister of West Pakistan. Though they were close personal friends, Malhi declined to accept the posts because of ideological differences. He was later offered a ministry post by General Zia, but he again declined.

Malhi successfully retained his seat in the National Assembly until 1971. As a result of the secession of East Pakistan and his disappointment with the corrupt politicking of later politicians, he retired from electoral politics.

== Death ==
Naseer Ahmad Malhi died on 12 July 1991 at age 79.

== See also ==
- Malhi
- Muhammad Ali Jinnah
