= Mehnaz Aziz =

Pakistani politician

Member of the National Assembly of Pakistan
- In office 13 August 2018 – 10 August 2023
- Constituency: NA-77 (Narowal-I)

Personal details
- Party: IND (2024- [present)
- Other political affiliations: PMLN (2018-2024)
- Spouse: Daniyal Aziz
- Education: University of Sussex

Mehnaz Akbar Aziz is a Pakistani politician who had been a member of the National Assembly of Pakistan from August 2018 till August 2023.

== Early life and career ==
Mehnaz completed the Masters in Anthropology from the Quaid-i-Azam University and another Masters in Gender and Development Studies from the University of Sussex.

She was elected to the National Assembly of Pakistan as a candidate of Pakistan Muslim League (N) (PML-N) from Constituency NA-77 (Narowal-I) in the 2018 Pakistani general election. She received 106,366 votes and defeated Muhammad Tariq Anis.

She and her husband, Daniyal Aziz, decided to run as independent candidates in the 2024 elections, after they did not receive the PML(N)'s nominations for any seat.
