= Depoke =

- Location within Pakistan
- Coordinates: 32.16°N 74.50°E
- Country: Pakistan
- Province: Punjab
- Elevation: 246 m (807 ft)
- Time zone: UTC+5 (PST)

Depoke is a village in Narowal District of Punjab province, Pakistan. It is located at 32°16'0N 74°50'0E with an altitude of 246 metres (810 feet). Neighbouring settlements include Lala, Seowal and Lohan.
