= Domala, Pakistan =

Domala
- Location within Pakistan
- Coordinates: 32.09°N 74.49°E
- Country: Pakistan
- Province: Punjab
- Division: Gujranwala
- District: Narowal
- Elevation: 784 m (2,572 ft)
- Time zone: UTC+5 (PST)

Domala is a village in Narowal District of Punjab province of Pakistan. It is located at 32°9'0N 74°49'0E with an altitude of 238 metres (784 feet). Neighbouring settlements include Chida, Gangor and Nonar.
