= Z. A. Suleri =

Pakistani journalist and writer

Ziauddin Ahmad Suleri

Additional Secretary of the Ministry of Information and Mass-media Broadcasting
- In office 6 September 1978 – 5 March 1980 Serving with BGen Siddique Salik, PA
- President: General Zia-ul-Haq

Editor-in-chief of the Dawn Newspapers
- In office 16 August 1965 – 5 September 1965
- Preceded by: Altaf Husain

Personal details
- Born: Ziauddin Ahmad Suleri; 1912/1913 Deoli, Zafarwal, British Raj
- Died: 21/22 April 1999 (aged 86) Karachi, Sindh, Pakistan
- Resting place: New Karachi Cemetery
- Party: Muslim League
- Spouse: Mair Jones
- Children: Sara Suleri, Shahid Suleri, Tillat Suleri, Irfan Suleri, Ifat Suleri, Nuzhat Suleri
- Education: Punjab University; Patna University
- Nickname: Pip

Military service
- Allegiance: Pakistan
- Branch/service: Pakistan Army
- Years of service: 1965–66
- Rank: Colonel
- Unit: 17th Army Division
- Commands: Inter-Services Public Relations
- Battles/wars: Indo-Pakistani war of 1965

Ziauddin Ahmad Suleri (6/6/1913 – 21/22 April 1999), best known as Z. A. Suleri, was a Pakistani military officer and conservative writer who served as a Director-General of Inter-Services Public Relations. He also served as an editor-in-chief of state-owned newspaper, Pakistan Times, during the presidency of Ayub Khan and Zia-ul-Haq.

== Early life and education ==
Ziauddin Ahmad Suleri was born in Deoli, Zafarwal, North India, British Raj (present-day Punjab, Pakistan). He was a Rajput Salahria. After his graduation from school, he briefly studied British literature at Patna University, where he obtained a BA in English. He moved to Lahore to attend the Punjab University to further study English literature. He earned an MA in British literature after compiling a critical and analytical thesis on Great Expectations, written by Charles Dickens.

== Political activism and military service ==
Due to his long attraction to the work of Charles Dickens, Suleri earned the nickname of "Pip" from his family and friends. He moved to Karachi after becoming politically aligned with the Muslim League, led by Muhammad Ali Jinnah. In support of the Pakistan Movement, he penned many political columns and opinions in the Orient Press as well as the British Evening Times.

Suleri also authored and published "The Road to Peace and Pakistan" in 1944, and My Leader in 1945; all of which greatly exhorted the political objectives of the Pakistan Movement and the independence from the British India of the British Empire. In 1946, he departed for the United Kingdom but returned to Pakistan after the partition by the United Kingdom. Immediately after his return, he was appointed assistant editor of the English language newspaper, the Dawn. He left Dawn when the Pakistan Times was started in 1947, and took an assignment as its correspondent in London. For sometime, he remained associated with the Pakistan Army and briefly served in Inter-Services Public Relations, which he eventually becoming its director-general and achieved the rank of colonel in 1965.

== Career in journalism and ministry ==
Suleri was appointed as editor of The Pakistan Times in 1966. During this time, he gained a conservative consciousness and wrote in support of military governments and capitalism. He penned several articles against the left-oriented Pakistan People's Party during the general elections held in 1970. Subsequently, he was removed by Prime Minister Zulfikar Ali Bhutto from The Pakistan Times and was thrown in jail after penning an article against socialism.

After an inquiry launched by the FIA, Suleri was picked up on charges of sedition at the behest of FIA director M.A. Gurmani, and his case was tried in the Central Jail in Punjab. After the imposition of martial law in 1977, chief of army staff General Zia-ul-Haq released him from prison and ultimately appointed him for a stint as editor-in-chief of The Pakistan Times. His political ideas further pushed him to be close with the military government whereas he briefly served as additional secretary of the Ministry of Information and Mass-media Broadcasting. During this time, he also served as the chairman of the Quaid-i-Azam Academy. His association with the military government remained close and he witnessed key political events in the lives of Zia-ul-Haq and Nawaz Sharif.

== Death ==
In 1992, Suleri joined the senior staff of The News International, where he was promoted to become editor-in-chief of the newspaper. Suleri was diagnosed with cancer and heart disease in 1995. On 22 April 1999, he died of heart failure at the Jinnah Hospital, Karachi, aged 86.

== Books ==
- Suleri, Ziauddin A. (1945). The road to peace and Pakistan. Karachi, Sindh: Sh. M. Ashraf Publishing Co.
- Suleri, ZA (1946). My leader: Being an estimate of Mr. Jinnah's work for Indian Mussalmans. Karachi: Lion's Publications.
- Suleri, Ziauddin Ahmad (1950). Atheism in Pakistan. Lahore: Pioneer Publishers.
- Suleri, ZA (1953), Whither Pakistan?, Lahore: Eastern Publications
- Suleri, Z. Ahmad (1962). Pakistan's lost years;: Being a survey of a decade of politics, 1948–1958. Progressive Papers (1962).
- Suleri, Z.A. (1964). Politicians & Ayub: Being a Survey of Pakistani Politics from 1948 to 1964. Lion Art Press (1964).
- Suleri, Z.Ahmad (1974). Quaid-i-Millat Liaquat Ali Khan, Leader and Statesman. Lahore: Oriental Academy.
- Suler, Z.A. (1978). Influence of Islam on western civilization. Islamabad: National Book Foundation; 1st ed edition (1978).
- Ahmad Suleri, Ziauddin (1989). Al-Quran : divine book of eternal value. Karachi, Pakistan: Royal Book Co. ISBN 978-9694070803.
- Ahmad Suleri, Ziauddin (1989). Islam : universal religion. Karachi, Pakistan: Royal Book. ISBN 978-9694071039.
- Suleri, Z. A. (1990). Shaheed-e-Millat Liaquat Ali Khan: Builder of Pakistan. Lahore: Royal Book Co.
- Ahmad, Ziauddin (1994). Influence of Islam on world civilization. Karachi, Pakistan: Royal Book Co. ISBN 978-9694071640.

== His unfinished biography ==
When ZA Suleri wanted to write his autobiography, he chose Boys Will Be Boys as its title. The autobiography never materialised, and after his death when his daughter, Sara Suleri, decided to write a tribute to him, she gave this title to the book.
