= Zafarwal =

City in Punjab, Pakistan

Zafarwal ظفروال
- City
- Location within Punjab, Pakistan Location within Pakistan
- Coordinates: 32°21′0″N 74°54′0″E
- Country: Pakistan
- Province: (Punjab, Pakistan) Punjab
- Division: Gujranwala
- District: Narowal
- Tehsil: Zafarwal
- Founder: Zafar Khan Bajwa

Area
  - Total: 10 km^{2} (3.9 sq mi)
  - Rank: N/A

Population (2023)
  - Total: 52,639
  - Rank: N/A
- Time zone: UTC+5 (PST)
- Area code: 0542

Zafarwal is a city in the Narowal District of Punjab, Pakistan. It is also the headquarters of Zafarwal Tehsil. It is about 42 km from sports city of sialkot It was found many centuries ago by Zafar Khan.It contains major residential areas including Hussnain town, Muslim town, Mustafa Abad and Nangal.

== Geography ==
Zafarwal is situated in the north-east of Punjab, at an elevation of 268 meters (882 feet) above sea level.

== Demography ==
Historical population
Year	Pop.	±% p.a.
1951	...	—
1961	4,074	—
1972	7,610	+5.84%
1981	10,464	+3.60%
1998	19,824	+3.83%
2017	39,319	+3.67%
2023	52,639	+4.98%

The population of Zafarwal comprises diverse ethnic groups, with Punjabis constituting the majority, accounting for approximately 85% of the population. Additionally, there is a significant population of migrants who moved from India to Pakistan during the partition in 1947, commonly referred to as "mohajirs," making up around 25% of the population. Pathans, along with other smaller ethnic groups, constitute around 0.5% of the population.
