= Muhammad Tariq Anis =

Pakistani politician

Member of the National Assembly of Pakistan
- In office 2008–2013
- Constituency: NA-116 (Narowal-II)

Muhammad Tariq Anis is a Pakistani politician who had been a member of the National Assembly of Pakistan from 2008 to 2013. He had been a member of the Provincial Assembly of Punjab from 1988 to 1990 and again from 1993 to 1996.

== Political career ==
He was elected to the Provincial Assembly of Punjab as a candidate of Islami Jamhoori Ittehad (IJI) from Constituency PP-114 (Sialkot-XIII) in the 1988 Pakistani general election. He received 16,933 votes and defeated an independent candidate, Atiq-ur-Rehman. During his tenure as Member of the Punjab Assembly, he served as Parliamentarian Secretary for Home.

He ran for the seat of the Provincial Assembly of Punjab as a candidate of IJI from Constituency PP-114 (Sialkot-XIII) in the 1990 Pakistani general election but was unsuccessful. He received 22,984 votes and lost the seat to Atiq-ur-Rehman, a candidate of IJI.

He was re-elected to the Provincial Assembly of Punjab as a candidate of Pakistan Muslim League (N) (PML-N) from Constituency PP-114 (Narowal-III) in the 1993 Pakistani general election. He received 18,302 votes and defeated an independent candidate, Shoukat Ali.

He ran for the seat of the Provincial Assembly of Punjab as a candidate of Pakistan Muslim League (J) from Constituency PP-114 (Narowal-III) in the 1997 Pakistani general election but was unsuccessful. He received 9,276 votes and lost the seat to an independent candidate, Molvu Ghayas ud Din.

He ran for the seat of the National Assembly of Pakistan as an indedpent candidate from Constituency NA-116 (Narowal-II) in the 2002 Pakistani general election but was unsuccessful. He received 37,145 votes and lost the seat to Daniyal Aziz.

He was elected to the National Assembly from Constituency NA-116 (Narowal-II) as an independent candidate in the 2008 Pakistani general election and joined the Pakistan Peoples Party (PPP). He received 45,097 votes and defeated Daniyal Aziz. In November 2008, he was inducted into the federal cabinet of Prime Minister Yousaf Raza Gillani and was appointed as Minister of State for Housing and Works where he served until February 2011.

In 2012, he was appointed as chairman of the Zarai Taraqiati Bank Limited.

He ran for the seat of the National Assembly of Pakistan as a PPP candidate from Constituency NA-116 (Narowal-II) in the 2013 Pakistani general election but was unsuccessful. He received 40,219 votes and lost the seat to Daniyal Aziz.

He ran for the seat of the National Assembly of Pakistan as an independent candidate from NA-77 (Narowal-I) in the 2018 Pakistani general election but was unsuccessful. He received 70,808 votes and lost the seat to Mehnaz Aziz.
