= Yale Journal of Criticism =

- Discipline: Humanities
- Language: English

Publication details
- History: 1988–2005
- Publisher: Johns Hopkins University Press (United States)
- Frequency: Biannually
- Impact factor: (2014)

Standard abbreviations
- ISO 4: Yale J. Crit.

Indexing
- CODEN: YJCRFL
- ISSN: 0893-5378 (print); 1080-6636 (web)
- LCCN: 88654724
- OCLC no.: 750909818

Links
- Journal homepage

The Yale Journal of Criticism was an academic journal published by the Johns Hopkins University Press which covered all humanities disciplines. It was named best new journal by the Conference of Editors of Learned Journals in 1989 and ceased publication in 2005.
