= University of Narowal =

- جامعہ نارووال
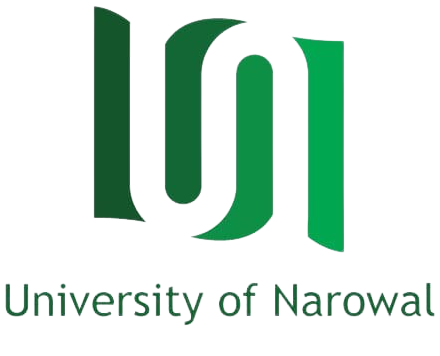
- Former name: UOG Narowal Campus
- Motto: Education for Better
- Type: Public
- Established: April 2018
- Founder: Ahsan Iqbal
- Affiliations: Higher Education Department (Punjab) Higher Education Commission (Pakistan)
- Chancellor: Governor of Punjab
- Vice-Chancellor: Prof. Dr. Muhammad Zia Ul Haq (T.I.)
- Location: Narowal, Punjab, Pakistan; 32.09429°N 74.87455°E
- Colors: Green – White
- Nickname: UON
- Website: uon.edu.pk

The University of Narowal (Urdu: جامعہ نارووال) is a public university located in Narowal, Punjab, Pakistan.

== Established ==
In 2018, the Punjab Assembly passed the University of Narowal Act, granting it autonomous status. Prior to its establishment as an independent university, the institution functioned as the Narowal Campus of the University of Gujrat (UOG).

== Ranking ==
According to the AD Scientific Index 2024, the University of Narowal is ranked 226th among Pakistani institutions. Additionally, the university holds the 181st position in Pakistan according to uniRank's 2024 University Ranking.

== Grading System ==
The University of Narowal (UON) uses an absolute grading system with a fixed range. The grading table is:

Grading Table
Percentage	Grade	GPA
84.5 and above	A+	4.00
79.5-84	A	3.70
74.5-79	B+	3.40
69.5-74	B	3.00
64.5-69	B-	2.50
59.5-64	C+	2.00
54.5-59	C	1.50
49.5-54	D	1.00
49.4 and below	F	0.00
