= Mian Muhammad Rashid =

Pakistani politician

- میاں محمد راشد

Member of the National Assembly of Pakistan
- In office 1 June 2013 – 31 May 2018
- Constituency: NA-115 (Narowal)

Personal details
- Born: 1 May 1948 (age 78)

Mian Muhammad Rashid (Urdu: میاں محمد راشد; born 1 May 1948) is a Pakistani politician who had been a member of the National Assembly of Pakistan from June 2013 to May 2018.He had been elected five-time member of Provisional Assembly of Punjab.

== Early life ==
He was born on 1 May 1948.

== Political career ==
He was elected to the National Assembly of Pakistan as a candidate of Pakistan Muslim League (N) (PML-N) from Constituency NA-115 (Narowal-I) in the 2013 Pakistani general election. He received 71,139 votes and defeated an independent candidate, Muhammad Irfan Abid.

In May 2018, he quit PML-N and joined Pakistan Tehreek-e-Insaf (PTI).
