= Qila Sobha Singh =

Qila Sobha Singh قلعہ سوبھا سنگھ
- Town
- Location in Punjab, Pakistan
- Coordinates: 32°14′0″N 74°46′0″E
- Country: Pakistan
- Province: Punjab
- District: Narowal
- Tehsil: Narowal
- Founder: Sobha Singh Sandhu
- Elevation: 790 ft (240 m)

Population (2023)
  - Town: 19,671
  - Urban: 19,671 (100%)
- Time zone: UTC+5 (PST)
  - Summer (DST): +6
- Postal code: 51560
- Area code: 0542

Qila Sobha Singh (Punjabi, Urdu: قلعہ سوبھا سنگھ) is a town in Narowal District of the Punjab province of Pakistan. It was founded by Sardar Sobha Singh a Sandhu Jatt from Thokar Niaz Baig Lahore. Before 1 July 1991, it was part of the Sialkot District. Since 1 July 1991, it has been part of the Narowal District, and is located at 32°14′0″N 74°46′0″E, at an altitude of 240 metres (790 ft).

== Climate ==
Lying between 31°30′ North latitude and 73°32′ East longitude at an altitude of 252 metres (827 ft) above sea level, Qila Sobha Singh is bounded on the north by Sialkot, northwest by Pasrur, and on the south by Narowal. Qila Sobha Singh features a humid subtropical climate under the Köppen climate classification. The town is chilly during winters, and tepid, humid and sultry during summers. May and June are the hottest months. The temperature during winter may drop to 1 °C (34 °F). The land is, generally, plain and fertile. Most of the rain falls during the Monsoon season in summer which often results in flooding and deluge.

Climate data for Qila Sobha Singh, Pakistan
Month	Jan	Feb	Mar	Apr	May	Jun	Jul	Aug	Sep	Oct	Nov	Dec	Year
Mean daily maximum °C (°F)	17 (62)	22 (66)	25 (75)	32 (90)	38 (101)	39 (102)	34 (93)	32 (92)	33 (91)	31 (88)	25 (78)	21 (68)	29 (84)
Mean daily minimum °C (°F)	5 (41)	8 (46)	12 (53)	18 (64)	23 (73)	26 (78)	26 (78)	25 (77)	23 (73)	17 (62)	10 (50)	5 (41)	16 (60)
Average precipitation cm (inches)	4.1 (1.6)	4 (1.6)	4.4 (1.7)	2.1 (0.8)	1.7 (0.7)	6.8 (2.7)	27.1 (10.7)	25.6 (10.1)	13.2 (5.2)	1.4 (0.6)	1.1 (0.4)	2.1 (0.8)	93.6 (36.8)
Source: Weatherbase

== Geography ==
It is in eastern Pakistan, 21 km (13 mi) north of Narowal, 11 km (6.8 mi) from Pasrur on its southern side by road and rail. The town is 44 km (27 mi) from Sialkot and 127 km (79 mi) from Lahore. It lies 251 metres (823 ft) above sea level. The Nala Dek flows to the northwest.

== Demographics ==
=== Population ===
Historical population
Year	Pop.	±% p.a.
1951	...	—
1961	3,426	—
1972	4,877	+3.26%
1981	6,377	+3.02%
1998	10,978	+3.25%
2017	14,318	+1.41%
2023	19,671	+5.44%

According to 2023 census, Qila Sobha Singh had a population of 19,671.

=== Religion ===
According to the 1998 census, 97% of Qila Sobha Singh's population is Muslim and 2.40% is Christian.
