= Seowal =

- Location within Pakistan
- Coordinates: 32.19°N 74.47°E
- Country: Pakistan
- Province: Punjab
- Elevation: 254 m (833 ft)
- Time zone: UTC+5 (Pakistan Standard Time)

Seowal is a village (Town) in Sialkot District of Punjab province of Pakistan. It is located at 32°19'0N 74°47'0E at an altitude of 254 metres (836 feet).
