= Daniyal Aziz =

Pakistani politician

- دانیال عزیز

Minister for Privatisation
- In office 10 August 2017 – 31 May 2018
- President: Mamnoon Hussain
- Prime Minister: Shahid Khaqan Abbasi

Member of the National Assembly of Pakistan
- In office 1997 to 2008 and 1 June 2013 – 31 May 2018
- Constituency: NA-116 (Narowal-II)

Personal details
- Born: 25 February 1965 (age 61) Lahore, Punjab, Pakistan
- Party: PTI (2025-present)
- Other political affiliations: IND (2024-2025); PMLN (2013-2024); PML(Q) (2002-2013)
- Spouse: Mehnaz Aziz
- Relations: Anwar Aziz Chaudhry (father)

Daniyal Aziz Choudhry (Punjabi, Urdu: دانیال عزیز; born 25 February 1965) is a Pakistani politician who served as Minister for Privatization, in Abbasi cabinet from August 2017 to May 2018. He had been a member of the National Assembly of Pakistan between 1997 and May 2018.

== Early life ==
Choudhry was born on 25 February 1965 in Lahore (taxali gate) to politician Anwar Aziz Chaudhry, who once served in the Pakistani federal cabinet, and an American mother. According to PILDAT, he was born on 25 February 1965.

== Road accident injuries ==
On 16 June 2022, he was sustained critical injuries in a road accident in Shakargarh, a city in Punjab’s Narowal District. As per details, the vehicle of his car was hit by a speeding truck coming from the opposite direction near Bhajna Stop after its tyre burst. In the crash, a man travelling in the truck died on the spot, while three others sustained injuries. He has fractured one of his arms in the horrific crash. He was shifted to DHQ Hospital in Narowal.

On 17 June 2022, he was shifted to CMH Rawalpindi for medical treatment from where he was shifted to Services Hospital Lahore. According to doctors, his lungs were also damaged in the accident.

=== Health ===
Soon after the incident, Prime Minister Shehbaz Sharif called Aziz’s wife Mehnaz Aziz to inquire about the PML-N leader’s health. The premier added that he was praying for his health.

Meanwhile, Chief Minister Punjab Hamza Shahbaz ordered that the former PML-N lawmaker should be provided with all kinds of medical facilities and also summoned a report from the commissioner of Gujranwala Division and the regional police officer regarding the accident.

== Political career ==
Choudhry was elected to the National Assembly of Pakistan from the Constituency NA-91 (Narowal-II) as an independent candidate in the 1997 general election.

He was re-elected to the National Assembly from the Constituency NA-116 (Narowal-II) as an independent candidate in the 2002 general election and later joined Pakistan Muslim League (Q) (PML-Q). He previously served as the chairman of the National Reconstruction Bureau.

Choudhry ran for the seat of the National Assembly from Constituency NA-116 (Narowal-II) as a candidate of PML-Q in the 2008 general election but was unsuccessful.

In March 2013, he joined PML-N. Choudhry was re-elected to the National Assembly as a candidate of Pakistan Muslim League (N) (PML-N) from Constituency NA-116 (Narowal-II) in the 2013 Pakistani general election.

Following the election of Shahid Khaqan Abbasi as Prime Minister of Pakistan in August 2017, Choudhry was offered the cabinet membership as Minister of State however he declined it. Reportedly, he wanted to be appointed as federal minister. Later, he was inducted into the cabinet of Abbasi as a Minister for Privatization with the status of federal minister. Upon the dissolution of the National Assembly on the expiration of its term on 31 May 2018, Chaudhry ceased to hold the office as Federal Minister for Privatization.

In June 2018, he was disqualified by the Supreme Court of Pakistan in a contempt of court case and was barred from contesting in the 2018 general election. Following which he decided to field his wife Mehnaz Aziz in election.

He and his wife, Mehnaz Aziz, decided to run as independents in the 2024 elections after they did not receive the PML(N)'s nominations for any seat.
