= Zafarwal Tehsil =

Zafarwal Tehsil تحصیل ظفروال
- Tehsil
- Location within Pakistan
- Coordinates: 32.21°N 74.54°E
- Country: Pakistan
- Province: (Punjab, Pakistan) Punjab
- Division: Gujranwala
- District: Narowal
- Capital: Zafarwal

Government
  - MPA PP46 Ministry of religion affairs: Peer Syed Saeed Ul Hassan Shah

Area
  - Tehsil: 437.0 km^{2} (168.7 sq mi)
- Elevation: 268 m (879 ft)

Population (2023)
  - Tehsil: 501,213
  - Density: 1,146.94/km^{2} (2,970.6/sq mi)
  - Urban: 52,639 (10.50%)
  - Rural: 448,574

Literacy
  - Literacy rate: Total: (71.72%); Male: (76.59%); Female: (66.69%)
- Time zone: UTC+5 (PST)
- Calling code: 0542

Zafarwal Tehsil (Urdu: ظفروال تحصیل), headquartered at Zafarwal, is one of the three Tehsils (sub-divisions) of Narowal District in the Punjab province of Pakistan. The city of Zafarwal is the capital of the Tehsil.

== Geography ==
It is located at 32°21'0N 74°54'0E at an altitude of 268 metres (882 feet). It is 7 km from Jammu District, in Indian-administered Kashmir.

== Demographics ==
=== Population ===
Historical population
Year	Pop.	±% p.a.
1951	...	—
1961	...	—
1972	...	—
1981	...	—
1998	318,363	—
2017	439,006	+1.71%
2023	501,213	+2.23%

According to the 2023 Pakistan Census, the population of Tehsil Zafarwal was 501,213.

== See also ==
- Districts of Pakistan
  - Districts of Punjab, Pakistan
- Tehsils of Pakistan
  - Tehsils of Punjab, Pakistan
  - Tehsils of Balochistan
  - Tehsils of Khyber Pakhtunkhwa
  - Tehsils of Sindh
  - Tehsils of Azad Kashmir
  - Tehsils of Gilgit-Baltistan
