= Narowal Tehsil =

Coordinates: 32.1063135°N 74.8557424°E

Narowal Tehsil تحصیل نارووال
- Tehsil
- Tehsil Municipal Administration logo
- Interactive map of Narowal Tehsil
- Country: Pakistan
- Region: (Punjab, Pakistan) Punjab
- District: Narowal
- Capital: Narowal
- Union councils: 39

Area
  - Tehsil: 1,065 km^{2} (411 sq mi)

Population (2023)
  - Tehsil: 680,402
  - Density: 638.88/km^{2} (1,654.7/sq mi)
  - Urban: 169,714 (24.94%)
  - Rural: 510,688 (75.06%)

Literacy
  - Literacy rate: Total: (76.78%); Male: (80.61%); Female: (72.78%)
- Time zone: UTC+5 (PST)
  - Summer (DST): UTC+6 (PDT)
- Area code: 0542
- Number of Universities: 4
- Number of Medical Colleges: 2

Narowal (Urdu: تحصیل نارووال) is a tehsil (sub-division) of Narowal District, Punjab, Pakistan. It is administratively subdivided into 39 union councils, four of which form the tehsil capital Narowal.

== Demographics ==
=== Population ===
Historical population
Year	Pop.	±% p.a.
1951	251,732	—
1961	266,153	+0.56%
1972	385,878	+3.43%
1981	443,374	+1.56%
1998	425,879	−0.24%
2017	596,539	+1.79%
2023	680,402	+2.22%

As of the 2023 census, Narowal tehsil has a population of 680,402, of which urban population is 169,714 and rural population 510,588.

As of the 2023 census, Narowal Tehsil has overall literacy rate of 76.78%, with male literacy at 80.61% and female literacy at 72.78%.

== See also ==
- Divisions of Pakistan
  - Divisions of Punjab, Pakistan
- Districts of Pakistan
  - Districts of Punjab, Pakistan
- Tehsils of Pakistan
  - Tehsils of Punjab, Pakistan
  - Tehsils of Balochistan
  - Tehsils of Khyber Pakhtunkhwa
  - Tehsils of Sindh
  - Tehsils of Azad Kashmir
  - Tehsils of Gilgit-Baltistan
