= Narowal =

City in Punjab, Pakistan

Narowal نارووال
- City
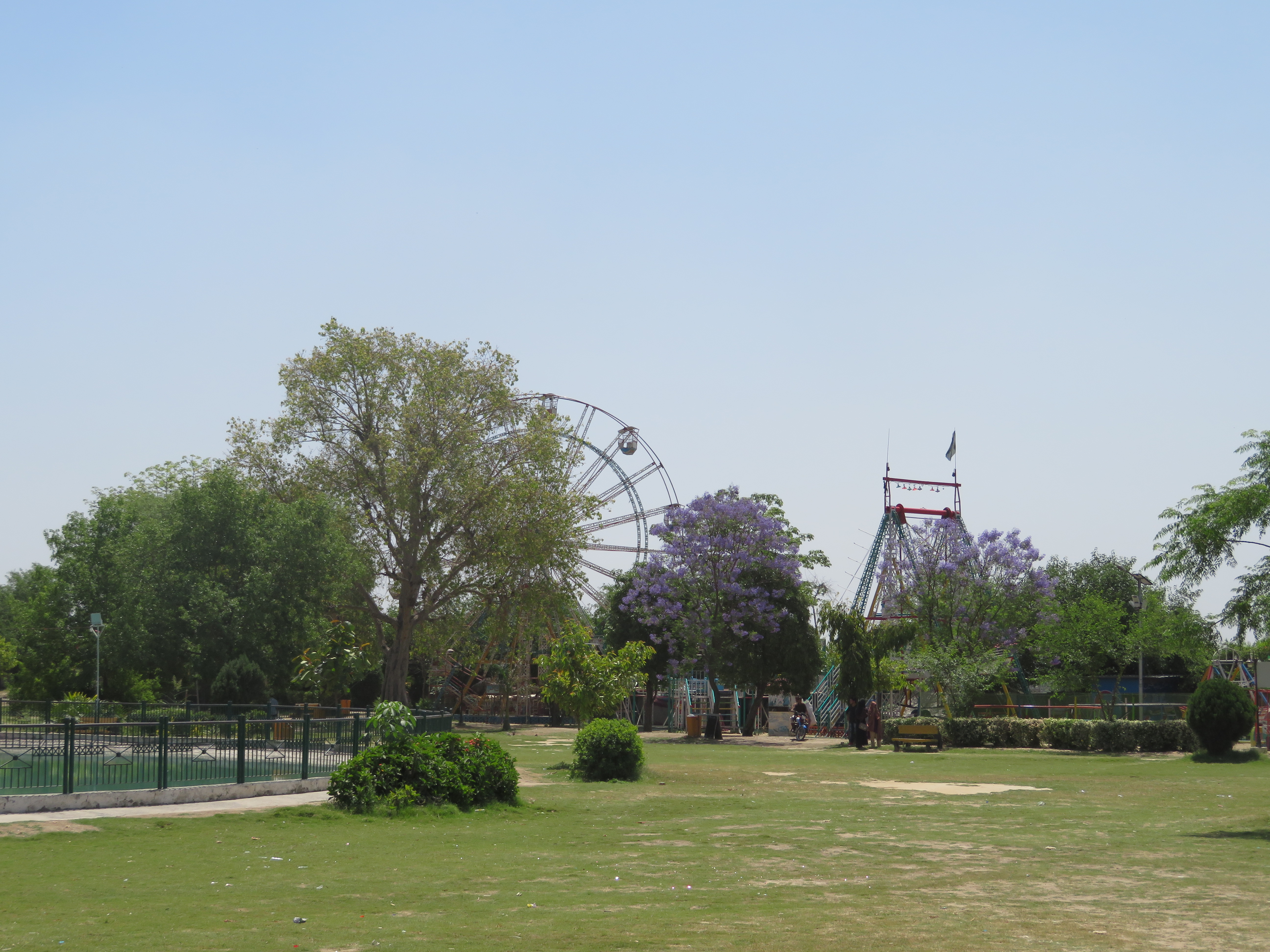
- Faiz Ahmed Park

- Location within Punjab, Pakistan Location within Pakistan
- Coordinates: 32°6′0″N 74°52′29″E
- Country: Pakistan
- Province: (Punjab, Pakistan) Punjab
- Division: Gujranwala
- District: Narowal
- Founder: Baba Naro Bajwa

Government
  - Type: Municipal Committee
  - Chief Officer: Mr. Umar Shujah
  - Municipal Officer: Mr. Adil Shahzad

Area
  - City: 200 km^{2} (77 sq mi)
- Elevation: 238 m (781 ft)

Population (2023 census)
  - City: 130,692
  - Rank: 92nd in Pakistan 60th in Punjab (2023)
- Demonym: Narowali
- Time zone: UTC+5 (PST)
- Postal code: 51600
- Area code: 0542
- Number of Universities: 4
- Number of Medical Colleges: 2
- Language: Punjabi
- Sex ratio (male/female): 103.48
- Website: http://www.narowal.gop.pk/

Narowal (Punjabi / Urdu: نارووال; pronounced [näɾoːˈʋälᵊ]) is a historic city located on the western bank of river Ravi in Punjab, Pakistan.

It was founded by a Jat named Baba Naro Bajwa many centuries ago. The city is the capital of Narowal District, and a part of the Gujranwala division. It is the 92nd most populous city of Pakistan. The economy is largely agriculture-based but football manufacturing and handicrafts industries also exist. Narowal houses many universities campuses, including the University of Narowal, University of Engineering and Technology Narowal Campus and the University of Veterinary and Animal Sciences Narowal Campus. The fertile land of Narowal produces one of the supreme quality rice in Pakistan.

A famous Sikh temple, Gurdwara Darbar Sahib Kartarpur, lies to the east of Narowal.

== Etymology ==
Although contradictory beliefs exist, the widely held narrative states that Narowal derived its name from a landlord Naro Bajwa in the 16th-century.

== History ==
In the sixteenth century, Narowal was a small village consisting of only a few houses of labourers around the farmhouse of Land-Lord Naro Bajwa. The city is the capital of Narowal District. The history of modern Narowal dates back to 90 years when Britishers established a railway link between eastern and western Punjab in its bid to strengthen their grip over Punjab. With the establishment of the railway junctions, investment begins to flow and the city begins to flourish with the passage of time. After the partition and establishment of Pakistan, the railway line between the east and west Punjab was blown off for security reasons. Initially, Narowal was a part of Sialkot district, later gained the status of Tehsil before becoming the District in 1992.

== Demographics ==
Population

Historical population

| Year | Pop. | ±% p.a. |
|---|---|---|
| 1951 | 15,298 | — |
| 1961 | 16,127 | +0.53% |
| 1972 | 22,174 | +2.94% |
| 1981 | 35,125 | +5.24% |

| Year | Pop. | ±% p.a. |
|---|---|---|
| 1998 | 57,052 | +2.89% |
| 2017 | 103,067 | +3.16% |
| 2023 | 130,692 | +4.04% |

According to 2023 census, Narowal had a population of 130,692. The population of Narowal consists of various ethnic groups including Punjabi almost 80%, the peoples who migrated from India to Pakistan in 1947 during partition (in Pakistan they are known as Muhajir) 19%, and Pathan including other minor groups 1%.

=== Language ===
Languages of Narowal MC (2023 Census)
1. Punjabi (88.7%)
2. Urdu (10.6%)
3. Others (0.70%)

Punjabi is the predominant Language with Urdu second most spoken language.

=== Religion ===
Religion in Narowal city (2023)
| Religion | Percent |
| Islam | 98% |
| Christianity | 1.5% |
| Other or not stated | 0.5% |

According to 2023 census, the majority religion in Narowal is Islam, at 98%. Christians make upto 1.5% of the population.

== Geography ==
Narowal lies from 31° 55' to 32° 30' latitude and 74° 35' to 75° 21' longitude. It is located in the northeast part of Punjab, Pakistan, about 96 kilometers north of the provincial capital Lahore. The Narowal District borders Sialkot to the west, Sheikhupura to the South, Gurdaspur (Eastern Punjab, India) to the east, and the Kathua District and Jammu Kashmir to the north.

=== Climate ===
Narowal has a Subtropical desert climate (Classification: BWh). The district's yearly temperature is 30.73 °C (87.31 °F) and it is 9.84% higher than Pakistan's averages. Narowal typically receives about 21.98 millimeters (0.87 inches) of precipitation and has 47.02 rainy days (12.88% of the time) annually.

Climate data for Narowal
| Month | Jan | Feb | Mar | Apr | May | Jun | Jul | Aug | Sep | Oct | Nov | Dec | Year |
|---|---|---|---|---|---|---|---|---|---|---|---|---|---|
| Record high °C (°F) | 28.74 (83.73) | 34.69 (94.44) | 43.6 (110.5) | 48.56 (119.41) | 51.53 (124.75) | 55.5 (131.9) | 52.52 (126.54) | 50.54 (122.97) | 49.55 (121.19) | 44.59 (112.26) | 36.67 (98.01) | 32.7 (90.9) | 55.5 (131.9) |
| Mean daily maximum °C (°F) | 21.96 (71.53) | 24.64 (76.35) | 30.35 (86.63) | 37.35 (99.23) | 42.94 (109.29) | 45.16 (113.29) | 43.05 (109.49) | 40.77 (105.39) | 40.2 (104.4) | 37.21 (98.98) | 29.88 (85.78) | 24.48 (76.06) | 34.83 (94.70) |
| Daily mean °C (°F) | 16.89 (62.40) | 19.86 (67.75) | 25.63 (78.13) | 33.15 (91.67) | 30.24 (86.43) | 42.05 (107.69) | 40.28 (104.50) | 37.87 (100.17) | 36.42 (97.56) | 32.79 (91.02) | 25.11 (77.20) | 19.4 (66.9) | 29.97 (85.95) |
| Mean daily minimum °C (°F) | 10.1 (50.2) | 11.77 (53.19) | 16.2 (61.2) | 23.66 (74.59) | 39.36 (102.85) | 34.11 (93.40) | 33.97 (93.15) | 31.58 (88.84) | 28.55 (83.39) | 24.63 (76.33) | 18.11 (64.60) | 13.09 (55.56) | 23.76 (74.77) |
| Record low °C (°F) | 3.96 (39.13) | 4.96 (40.93) | 8.92 (48.06) | 14.87 (58.77) | 21.8 (71.2) | 24.77 (76.59) | 25.77 (78.39) | 24.77 (76.59) | 22.79 (73.02) | 17.84 (64.11) | 10.9 (51.6) | 5.95 (42.71) | 3.96 (39.13) |
| Average precipitation mm (inches) | 11.05 (0.44) | 25.79 (1.02) | 31.2 (1.23) | 26.03 (1.02) | 20.23 (0.80) | 18.68 (0.74) | 48.71 (1.92) | 42.64 (1.68) | 31.93 (1.26) | 2.44 (0.10) | 2.69 (0.11) | 2.4 (0.09) | 21.98 (0.87) |
| Average precipitation days | 1.98 | 3.87 | 5.22 | 6.3 | 4.23 | 4.51 | 7.2 | 7.66 | 3.87 | 0.99 | 0.72 | 0.45 | 3.91 |
| Average relative humidity (%) | 43.51 | 46.13 | 43.78 | 27.88 | 18.92 | 21.83 | 33.29 | 40.69 | 36.87 | 26.65 | 27.99 | 29.69 | 33.10 |
| Mean daily sunshine hours | 8.32 | 9.31 | 11.16 | 12.75 | 13.49 | 13.93 | 13.71 | 13.05 | 12.01 | 8.6 | 8.51 | 8.41 | 11.11 |
Source: World Meteorological Organization

== Economy ==
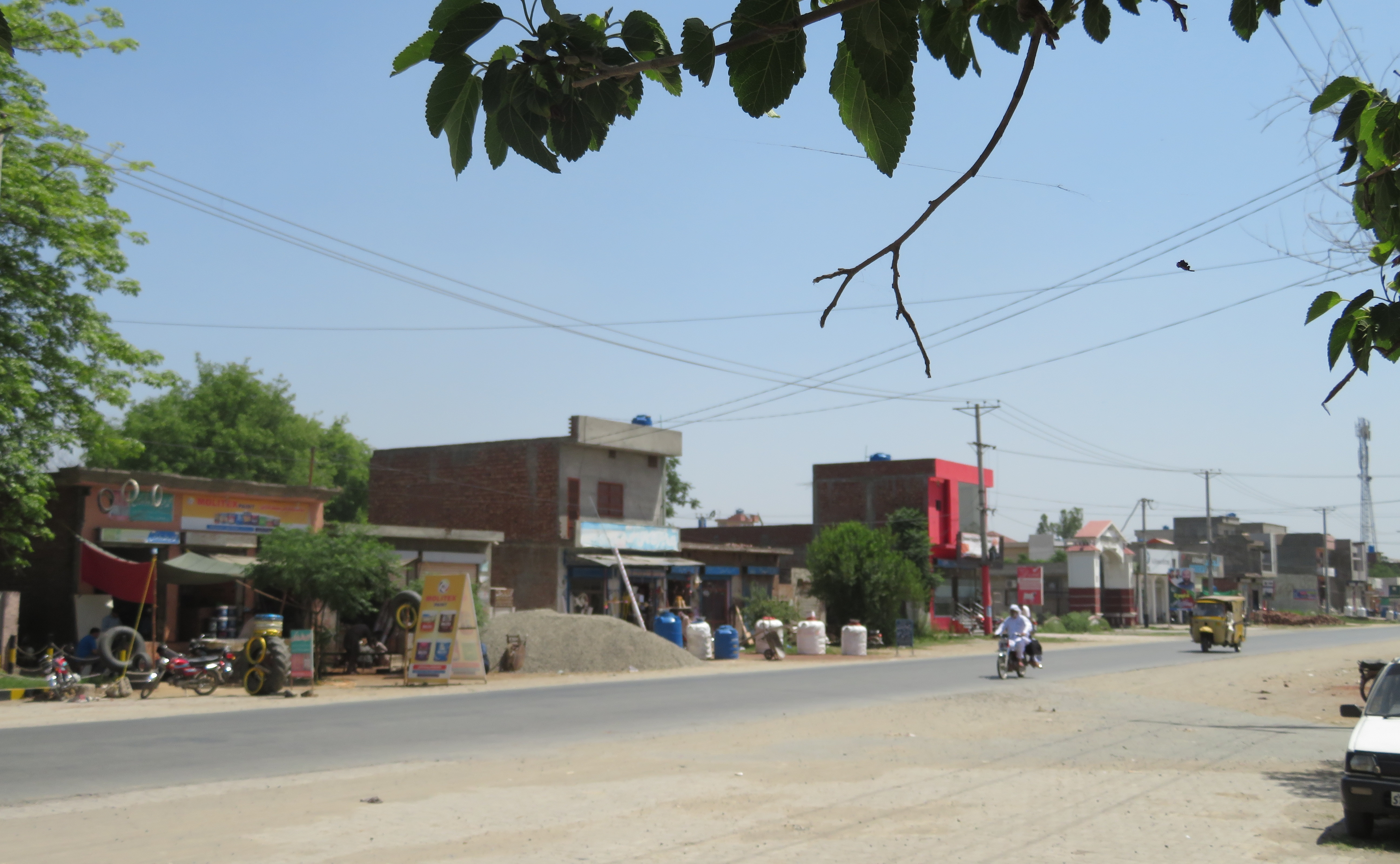
Main Road of Narowal

Narowal is an agro-based economy. Its fertile field produces high-quality rice, wheat, maze, corn, and Sugar cane. Rice especially produced in Narowal, is a major export and earn foreign exchange reserves for Pakistan. Wheat production secures food security of the country. Except that football manufacturing especially stitching, handicraft is included among industries of Narowal. Various bazaars including Zafarwal Road bazaar, Railway Bazar, Chota Bazar, are famous commercial points while Circular Road Narowal is emerging as a new business hub in the city.

== Education ==
Narowal is known as the "House of knowledge". Its literacy rate is highest among neighbour districts. It is the house of various universities and colleges.

List of universities in Narowal:

- University of Narowal (UON)
- University of Engineering and Technology, Lahore, Narowal campus
- University of Veterinary and Animal Sciences, Narowal campus
- Virtual University of Pakistan
- University of Gujrat(UOG), Narowal campus.University of Narowal used to be called as University of Gujrat(UOG)but later on UON got independent and now there is not a single Campus of University of Gujrat in Narowal.

Also there is a regional office of Allama Iqbal Open University in Narowal city.

- list of colleges in Narowal:
- Narowal public school and college, Narowal
- KIPS college Narowal
- Royal college of sciences, Narowal
- Punjab group of colleges, Narowal
- Aspire college, Narowal
- Govt. postgraduate College for women, Narowal
- Degree college for boys, Narowal

and a lot of other private and public sector colleges.

List of medical colleges:

- Narowal medical college, Narowal (public sector)
- Sahara medical college, Narowal (private)
- Al-shifa medical college, Narowal (private)

Narowal public school is one of the largest and best educational institutions in Narowal. There are many other schools like The Educators, Dar e Arqam school system, Hassan Scholars public school and IIUI school system etc. C.M.S. High School Narowal is the oldest school in the region, owned by the famous L.D.BE. Which is the same system that owns institutes like Forman Christian College, Kinnaird College, and Cathedral schools Lahore.

== See also ==
- Districts of Pakistan
  - Districts of Punjab, Pakistan
- Tehsils of Pakistan
  - Tehsils of Punjab, Pakistan
- Divisions of Pakistan
  - Divisions of Punjab, Pakistan
- List of cities in Pakistan by population
  - List of cities in Azad Kashmir by population
  - List of cities in Balochistan, Pakistan by population
  - List of cities in Gilgit-Baltistan by population
  - List of cities in Khyber Pakhtunkhwa by population
  - List of cities in Punjab, Pakistan by population
  - List of cities in Sindh by population
