= Shakargarh Tehsil =

Administrative division in Punjab, Pakistan

Shakargarh Tehsil تحصیل شکرگڑھ
- Tehsil
- Nicknames: Gateway of Mughals entering Gurdaspur and going to Delhi / City of the Braves
- Location within Pakistan
- Coordinates: 32.25°N 74.90°E
- Country: Pakistan
- Province: (Punjab, Pakistan) Punjab
- Division: Gujranwala
- District: Narowal
- Capital: Shakargarh

Area
  - Tehsil: 835 km^{2} (322 sq mi)
- Elevation: 268 m (879 ft)

Population (2023)
  - Tehsil: 769,339
  - Density: 921.36/km^{2} (2,386.3/sq mi)
  - Urban: 126,742 (16.47%)
  - Rural: 642,597

Literacy
  - Literacy rate: Total: (76.28%); Male: (81.38%); Female: (70.95%)
- Time zone: UTC+5 (PST)
- Calling code: +92542
- Website: shakargarh.punjab.gov.pk
- Ghulam Haider (November 17, 2015). "Shakargarh" (bbs). Google Maps.

Shakargarh (Urdu: تحصیل شکرگڑھ) is a tehsil located in Narowal District, Punjab, Pakistan. Shakargarh was the only one of the four tehsils of Gurdaspur district which was included in Pakistan at the time of the independence in 1947.

== History ==
Shakargarh became a tehsil in 1853. Its literacy rate is 97 percent. Sialkot was annexed by the British after the Second Anglo-Sikh War in 1849. In 1853, Shakargarh Tehsil of Sialkot district was transferred to Gurdaspur District and it remained an administrative subdivision of Gurdaspur district until the Partition in 1947. Under the Radcliffe Award, three of the four tehsils of Gurdaspur district on the eastern bank of the Ujh river (which joined the Ravi a little further down) – Gurdaspur, Batala and Pathankot – were awarded to India and only one, Shakargarh, was assigned to Pakistan. After the creation of Pakistan, Shakargarh became a part of Sialkot district once again. In July 1991, two tehsils (Narowal and Shakargarh) were split off from Sialkot district and Shakargarh became a tehsil of the newly formed Narowal district.

The Imperial Gazetteer of India, written over a hundred years ago during British rule, describes Shakargarh as follows:

Tahsīl of Gurdāspur District, Punjab, lying between 32°2' and 32° 30' N. and 74° 57' and 75° 23' E., with an area of 485 square miles (1,260 km^{2}). The Ravi divides it from the rest of the District to the south, while on the north it touches Jammu territory. West of the narrow lowlands along the Ravi, the country is an arid expanse of rolling downs intersected by torrent beds. The population in 1901 was 234,465, compared with 250,336 in 1891. It contains 703 villages, of which Shakargarh is the headquarters. The land revenue and cesses in 1903-4 amounted to Rs. 4,29,000.

== Administration ==
The tehsil of Shakargarh is administratively subdivided into union councils, three of which form the tehsil capital Shakargarh. These are:

- Mallah
- Achli
- Akhlaspur
- Babral
- Bara Manga
- Chak Fatehpur
- Afghana
- Bhati
- Bua Shakargarh
- Badwal
- Bajjar Chak
- Chandwal
- Chatrana
- Darapur, Shakargarh|Darapur
- Darman, Shakargarh|Darman
- Dinga
- Dinga Narainpur
- Fatwal
- Gamrola
- Jamwal
- Kanjrur
- Mangri, Shakargarh|Mangri
- Masrur
- Nagwal
- Nurkot
- Rambari
- Shakargarh-I
- Shakargarh-II
- Shakargarh-III
- Shahpur

== Demographics ==
=== Population ===
Historical population
Year	Pop.	±% p.a.
1951	...	—
1961	...	—
1972	...	—
1981	...	—
1998	520,855	—
2017	672,030	+1.35%
2023	769,339	+2.28%

As of the 2023 census, Shakargarh Tehsil in Narowal District, Punjab, Pakistan, has a total population of 769,339, with 642,597 residing in rural areas and 126,742 in urban areas. The tehsil covers an area of 835 square kilometers, resulting in a population density of approximately 921.36 people per square kilometer. The literacy rate in Shakargarh Tehsil is 76.28%, with male literacy at 81.38% and female literacy at 70.95%. The average annual growth rate is 1.35.

Shakargarh city, the administrative center of the tehsil, has a population of 126,742 as of 2023.

=== Religion ===
An overwhelming majority (99%) are Muslims with a small minority adhering to Christianity. Local Sikhs and Hindus.

Religion in Shakargarh Tehsil (1881–1941)
Religious group	1881		1891		1901		1911		1921		1931		1941	
Religious group	Pop.	%	Pop.	%	Pop.	%	Pop.	%	Pop.	%	Pop.	%	Pop.	%
Hinduism (Note: 1931-1941 census: Including Ad-Dharmis)	109,241	49.77%	119,750	47.84%	111,819	47.69%	93,052	44.22%	90,645	42.59%	101,318	40.96%	116,553	39.98%
Islam	105,176	47.91%	122,391	48.89%	115,189	49.13%	103,356	49.11%	106,168	49.88%	125,828	50.87%	149,600	51.32%
Sikhism	5,090	2.32%	7,252	2.9%	6,557	2.8%	10,553	5.01%	12,303	5.78%	15,730	6.36%	20,573	7.06%
Christianity	4	0.002%	943	0.38%	900	0.38%	3,486	1.66%	3,733	1.75%	4,487	1.81%	4,779	1.64%
Total Population	219,511	100%	250,336	100%	234,465	100%	210,447	100%	212,849	100%	247,363	100%	291,505	100%
Note: British Punjab province era tehsil borders are not an exact match in the present-day due to various bifurcations to tehsil borders — which since created new tehsils — throughout the historic Punjab Province region during the post-independence era that have taken into account population increases.

=== Tribes ===
Gujjar and Jats are the predominant caste followed in order by Ansaris, Pathans, and Rajputs. The tehsil has one of the highest literacy rates in Pakistan at over 87%.

== Notable people ==
- Dev Anand : Indian Bollywood actor
- Anwar Aziz Chaudhry : Former member of the National Assembly and federal minister.
- Muhammad Tariq Anis : Ex Minister, MNA and MPA.
- Daniyal Aziz : Ex MNA
- Shiv Kumar Batalvi : Punjabi poet.
- Nek Chand : Indian sculptor and creator of Rock Garden, Chandigarh
- Chaudhry Abdul Rahim : Ex MLA and MNA. He was given title of khan bahadur by British Raj.
- Gurbachan Singh Salaria : Captain of British Indian Army, he was awarded by Param Vir Chakra.
- S. M. Zafar : former minister, human rights lawyer in Pakistan

== See also ==
- Tehsils of Pakistan
  - Tehsils of Punjab, Pakistan
  - Tehsils of Balochistan
  - Tehsils of Khyber Pakhtunkhwa
  - Tehsils of Sindh
  - Tehsils of Azad Kashmir
  - Tehsils of Gilgit-Baltistan
