= Narowal District =

District of Punjab, Pakistan

Coordinates: 32°13′N 74°57′E

Narowal District ضِلع نارووال
- District of Punjab
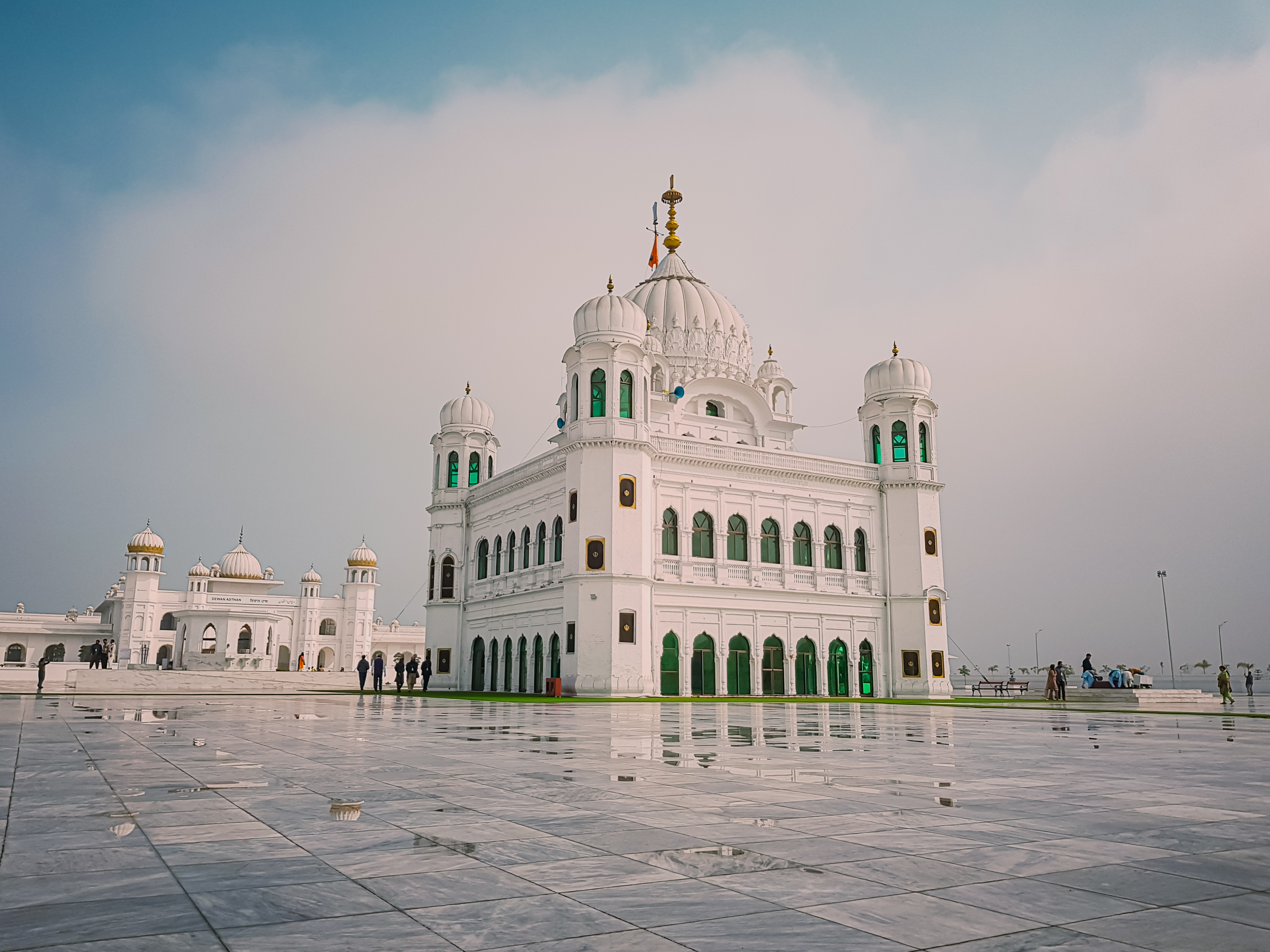
- Gurudwara Darbar Sahib, Kartarpur

- Map of Narowal in Punjab
- Country: Pakistan
- Province: Punjab
- Division: Gujranwala
- Headquarters: Narowal

Government
  - Type: District Administration
  - Deputy Commissioner: Muhammad Shahrukh
  - District Police Officer: Muhammad Naveed Malik SP
  - District Health Officer: N/A

Area
  - District of Punjab: 2,337 km^{2} (902 sq mi)
  - Rank: 113th in Pakistan
- Elevation: 238 m (781 ft)

Population (2023)
  - District of Punjab: 1,950,954
  - Rank: 42nd in Pakistan
  - Density: 834.8/km^{2} (2,162/sq mi)
  - Rank: 29th in Pakistan
  - Urban: 349,095 (17.89%)
  - Rural: 1,601,859 (82.11%)
- Demonym: Narowali

Literacy
  - Literacy rate: Total: (75.28%); Male: (79.89%); Female: (70.49%)
- Time zone: UTC+5 (PST)
- Postal code: 51600
- Area code: 0542
- Number of Tehsils: 3
- Number of Universities: 4
- Number of Medical Colleges: 2 (150 + 100 Seats)
- Website: narowal.punjab.gov.pk

Narowal District (Note: Punjabi and Urdu: ضِلع نارووال) is a district within the Gujranwala Division of Punjab, Pakistan. The city of Narowal serves as the headquarters of the district. It was formed in 1991 when the two tehsils of Narowal and Shakargarh were split off from Sialkot District.

== Administration ==
The district is administratively divided into the following three tehsils (subdivisions), which contain a total of 74 Union Councils:

Tehsil	Area (km²)	Pop. (2023)	Density (ppl/km²) (2023)	Literacy rate (2023)	Union Councils
Shakargarh	835	769,339	921.36	76.28%	28
Narowal	1,065	680,402	638.88	76.78%	28
Zafarwal	437	501,213	1,146.94	71.72%	26

== Urban areas ==
The district has six urban areas.

City	Area (km²)	Pop. (2023)	Density (ppl/km²) (2023)	Literacy rate (2023)
Narowal	200	130,692	...	...
Shakargarh	...	126,742	...	...
Zafarwal	10	52,639	...	...
Qila Sobha Singh	...	19,671	...	...
Baddomalhi	...	19,351	...	...
Talwandi Bhindran	...	13,000	...	...

== Geography ==
The district is bounded by Sialkot District on the northwest, by India on the north, by Kathua district of Jammu and Kashmir, Gurdaspur and Pathankot districts on the southeast, Amritsar district on the south, and Sheikhupura district in Pakistan on the southwest.

== Demography ==
=== Population ===
Historical population
Year	Pop.	±% p.a.
1951	512,475	—
1961	550,425	+0.72%
1972	834,501	+3.86%
1981	908,977	+0.95%
1998	1,265,097	+1.96%
2017	1,707,575	+1.59%
2023	1,950,954	+2.25%

As of the 2023 census, Narowal district had a population of 1,950,954 which is roughly equal to the population of Santa Clara County, California, USA and Huangpu District, Guangzhou, China. There are 281,536 households. The district has a sex ratio of 104.40 males to 100 females and a literacy rate of 75.28%: 79.89% for males and 70.49% for females. 494,799 (25.36% of the surveyed population) are under 10 years of age. 349,095 (17.89%) live in urban areas. According to the 2017 census, total population of District Narowal is 1.709 million. Male population is 0.853 m (49.96%) and female population is 0.855 m (50.04%). According to the 1998 census of Pakistan, Narowal District's population was 1,256,097, of which only 12.11% were urban.

The total area of the district is approximately 2,337 square kilometres. Prior to the creation of Zafarwal Tehsil in July 2009, Narowal Tehsil occupied 1,065 square kilometres while the remaining area (1,272 square kilometres) fell in Shakargarh Tehsil.

=== Religion ===
Religion in Narowal district (2023)
Religion	Percent
Islam	97.48%
Christianity	2.23%
Other or not stated	0.29%

As of 2023, 97.48% of the population adheres to Islam whereas 2.22% adheres to Christianity. There is a small Hindu population in the district.

Religion in contemporary Narowal District
Religious group	1941		2017		2023	
Religious group	Pop.	%	Pop.	%	Pop.	%
Islam	296,582	53.05%	1,663,508	97.42%	1,901,645	97.48%
Hinduism (Note: 1941: Including Ad-Dharmis)	170,883	30.56%	657	0.04%	833	0.04%
Sikhism	67,267	12.03%	—N/a	—N/a	125	0.01%
Christianity	24,127	4.32%	37,910	2.22%	43,421	2.23%
Ahmadiyya	—N/a	—N/a	5,430	0.32%	4,491	0.23%
Others	244	0.04%	70	~0%	254	0.01%
Total Population	559,103	100%	1,707,575	100%	1,950,769	100%
Note: 1941 census data is for Narowal tehsil of Sialkot district and Shakargarh tehsil of Gurdaspur district, which roughly corresponds to contemporary Narowal district. District and tehsil borders have changed since 1941.

=== Language ===
Languages of Narowal district (2023)
1. Punjabi (94.3%)
2. Urdu (3.05%)
3. Mewati (2.28%)
4. Others (0.38%)

At the time of the 2023 census, 94.29% of the population spoke Punjabi, 3.05% Urdu and 2.28% Mewati as their first language.

== Education ==
District Narowal boasts a robust educational infrastructure, featuring a total of 1,609 schools that cater to students at the foundational and secondary levels. Higher education is supported by 35 colleges, which include 8 for boys, 4 for girls, and 3 dedicated commerce colleges, providing a range of academic and professional programs. In addition, the presence of 3 universities further enhances the opportunities for advanced studies and research, contributing significantly to the overall development of education in the area.

Here is the list of universities & medical colleges in Narowal:

University/Campus	Established	Specialization	Type
University of Narowal	2018	General	Public
University of Engineering and Technology, Lahore, Narowal campus	2012	General	Public
University of Veterinary and Animal Sciences, Narowal campus	2017	General	Public
Narowal Medical College	2024	Medical	Public
Virtual University of Pakistan, Narowal virtual campus		General	Private
Sahara Medical College Narowal	2015	Medical	Private

**University of Narowal (UoN) was previously the Narowal campus of University of Gujrat (UoG), but later on UoN became an independent university. Now there is no campus of UoG in Narowal.

== Health ==
The following hospitals operate in Narowal district:

Name	Type	Established	Beds
DHQ Hospital, Narowal	Public	1991	300
Sughra Shafi Medical Hospital Complex	Private	2003	600

== Notable people ==
- Dev Anand, Bollywood actor, director & producer
- Muhammad Tariq Anis: Ex MPA and MNA
- Daniyal Aziz, State Minister of Broadcasting
- Shiv Kumar Batalvi, Punjabi poet
- Anwar Aziz Chaudhry, politician
- Ijaz Ahmed Chaudhry, justice
- Faiz Ahmad Faiz, Pakistani revolutionary poet
- Abrar-ul-Haq, singer-songwriter, philanthropist, politician
- Syed Saeed ul Hassan, Minister of Punjab for Auqaf and Religious Affairs
- Adnan Ilyas, cricketer
- Ahsan Iqbal, Interior Minister of Pakistan
- Chaudhry Muhammad Sarwar Khan, longest serving Parliamentarian in the history of Pakistan.
- Rajendra Kumar, Indian film actor, director, producer, recipient of Padma Shri (1969)
- Naseer Ahmad Malhi, one of the founding fathers of Pakistan and the first education minister of Pakistan
- Chaudhry Abdul Rahim, politician
- Des Raj, Indian cricket umpire
- Afzal Ahsan Randhawa, writer
- Gurbachan Singh Salaria, former Indian Army officer
- Kidar Sharma, Indian film director, producer, screenwriter, and Lyricist of Hindi films.
- Z. A. Suleri, political journalist

== Constituencies ==
Provincial Assembly Constituency	National Assembly Constituency
PP-54 Narowal-I	NA-75 Narowal-I
PP-55 Narowal-II	NA-75 Narowal-I
PP-56 Narowal-III	NA-76 Narowal-II
PP-57 Narowal-IV	NA-76 Narowal-II
PP-58 Narowal-V	NA-76 Narowal-II

== See also ==
- Districts of Pakistan
  - Districts of Khyber Pakhtunkhwa, Pakistan
  - Districts of Punjab, Pakistan
  - Districts of Balochistan, Pakistan
  - Districts of Sindh, Pakistan
  - Districts of Azad Kashmir
  - Districts of Gilgit-Baltistan
- Tehsils of Pakistan
  - Tehsils of Punjab, Pakistan
- Divisions of Pakistan
  - Divisions of Balochistan
  - Divisions of Khyber Pakhtunkhwa
  - Divisions of Punjab
  - Divisions of Sindh
  - Divisions of Azad Kashmir
  - Divisions of Gilgit-Baltistan
