= Fareed Express =

Pakistani express train

Overview
- Service type: Inter-city rail
- First service: 2002
- Current operators: S. Jamil & Co.

Route
- Termini: Karachi City; Lahore Junction
- Stops: 46
- Distance travelled: 1,250 kilometres (780 mi)
- Average journey time: 26 hours, 45 minutes
- Service frequency: Daily
- Train numbers: 37UP (Karachi→Lahore); 38DN (Lahore→Karachi)

On-board services
- Classes: Economy Class; AC Standard; AC Business
- Sleeping arrangements: Available
- Catering facilities: Available

Technical
- Track gauge: 1,676 mm (5 ft 6 in)
- Track owner: Pakistan Railways

Fareed Express (Urdu: فرید ایکسپریس) is a passenger train operated daily by Pakistan Railways between Karachi and Lahore. The trip takes approximately 26 hours and 45 minutes to cover a published distance of 1,250 kilometres (780 mi), traveling along a stretch of the Karachi–Peshawar Railway Line and Lodhran–Raiwind Branch Line. The train named after Baba Fareed Shakar Ganj, a famous Sufi saint and Punjabi poet who lived in Pakpattan between 1173–1266.

== History ==
On 21 August 2016, the Fareed Express train was privatized and outsourced to Syed Jamil & Company which joined hands with Pakistan Railway to operate the train in a private-public venture. The trains have been be equipped with internet service, AC services and catering.

== Route ==
- Karachi City–Lodhran Junction via Karachi–Peshawar Railway Line
- Lodhran Junction–Raiwind Junction via Lodhran–Raiwind Branch Line
- Raiwind Junction–Lahore Junction via Karachi–Peshawar Railway Line

== Station stops ==
- Karachi City
- Karachi Cantonment
- Drigh Road
- Landhi Junction
- Kotri Junction
- Hyderabad Junction
- Tando Adam Junction
- Shahdadpur
- Nawabshah Junction
- Pad Idan Junction
- Bhiria Road
- Mahrabpur Junction
- Rohri Junction
- Ghotki
- Mirpur Mathelo
- Sadiqabad
- Rahim Yar Khan
- Khanpur Junction
- Liaquatpur
- Dera Nawab Sahib
- Mubarakpur
- Samasata Junction
- Bahawalpur
- Lodhran Junction
- Jamraniwah
- Kahror Pakka
- Mailsi
- Nur Shah
- Vehari
- Machhianwala
- Mandi Burewala
- Gaggoo
- Arifwala
- Murad Chishti
- Pak Pattan
- Haveli Wasawewala
- Basirpur
- Mandi Ahmadabad
- Kanganpur
- Usmanwala
- Khudian Khas
- Kasur Junction
- Raiwind Junction
- Kot Lakhpat
- Walton
- Lahore Cantonment
- Lahore Junction

== Equipment ==
The train has Economy Class, AC Standard and AC Business accommodations.

== Incidents ==
- Karachi rail crash, 3 November 2016
