= Lodhran–Raiwind Branch Line =

Railway line in Pakistan

Lodhran–Raiwind Branch Line لودھراں-رائے ونڈ فرعی ریلوے خط

Overview
- Owner: Pakistan Railways
- Termini: Lodhran Junction; Raiwind Junction
- Stations: 31

Service
- Operator: Pakistan Railways

Technical
- Line length: 369 km (229 mi)
- Track gauge: 1,676 mm (5 ft 6 in)
- Operating speed: 75 km/h (47 mph)

Lodhran–Raiwind Branch Line (Urdu: لودھراں-رائے ونڈ فرعی ریلوے خط) is one of several branch lines in Pakistan, operated and maintained by Pakistan Railways. The line begins from Lodhran Junction station and ends at Raiwind Junction station. The total length of this railway line is 369 kilometers (229 mi). There are 31 railway stations from Lodhran Junction to Raiwind Junction. Currently, the only operational train on this branch line is the Fareed Express. The Fareed Express travels from Karachi to Lahore via Vehari Railway Station along this route.

== History ==
The rail line was originally completed as the Kasur–Lodhran Railway in 1909 by the Southern Punjab Railway as part of the Sutlej Valley Railway irrigation project. The line linked Kasur to Lodhran, where it connected to the North Western State Railway mainline to Karachi. However owing to World War I, financial stringency stagnated developments of the railways. In order to meet the necessities of the military authorities, this rail line (along with the Hyderabad–Badin Railway) was dismantled in 1917 and subsequently rebuilt in 1922.

== Stations ==
- Lodhran Junction
- Mujaldiwala Halt (Abandoned)
- Jamraniwah
- Pir Jewan Sultan (Abandoned)
- Kahror Pakka
- Amirpur Halt (Abandoned)
- Sardar Jhandir (Abandoned)
- Ashraf Shah (Abandoned)
- Mailsi
- Farm Noor Muhammad (Abandoned)
- Nur Shah
- Zafar Iqbal (Abandoned)
- Vehari
- Kussam Sar (Abandoned)
- Machhianwala
- Zahir Nagar (Abandoned)
- Mandi Burewala
- Rehmanpura Halt (Abandoned)
- Gaggoo
- Muhammad Nagar (Abandoned)
- Arifwala
- Kot Pir Abdul Aziz Halt (Abandoned)
- Murad Chishti
- Pakka Sidhar (Abandoned)
- Pak Pattan
- Chah Nur Muhammad
- Maulviwala Halt
- Chak Kambo (Abandoned)
- Haveli Wasawewala
- Kila Dewa Singh Halt
- Basirpur
- Gul Sher (Abandoned)
- Rasulpur Halt
- Mandi Ahmadabad
- Haji Chand Halt
- Kanganpur
- Basti Qutab Shah Halt
- Kul Mokal
- Usmanwala
- Dholan Halt
- Khudian Khas
- Roshan Bhila
- Kasur Junction
- Kasur Bypass (Abandoned)
- Athilpur (Abandoned)
- Raokhanwala
- Raja Jang
- Raiwind Junction

== See also ==
- Karachi–Peshawar Railway Line
- Railway Lines in Pakistan
