= Pakka Sidhar railway station =

Railway station in Pakistan

Pakka Sidhar Station پکا سدھار ریلوے اسٹیشن

General information
- Coordinates: 30.3193°N 73.274°E
- Owner: Ministry of Railways
- Line: Lodhran–Raiwind Branch Line

Other information
- Station code: PKS

Services
Preceding station	Pakistan Railways	Following station
Murad Chishti towards Lodhran Junction	Lodhran–Raiwind Branch Line	Pakpattan towards Raiwind Junction
Location

Pakka Sidhar Railway Station (Urdu: پکا سدھار ریلوے اسٹیشن) is located in Pakistan.

== See also ==
- List of railway stations in Pakistan
- Pakistan Railways
