= ZBA =

ZBA or zba may refer to:

- Zero balance account, a system of cash pooling
- ZBA, the station code for Zahirnagar railway station, Pakistan
- zba, the ISO 639-3 code for Balaibalan, the oldest known constructed language
