= Dholan Halt railway station =

Railway station in Pakistan

Coordinates: 30°57′N 74°16′E

Dholan Halt Railway Station ڈھولن ریلوے اسٹیشن

General information
- Owner: Ministry of Railways
- Line: Lodhran–Raiwind Branch Line

Other information
- Station code: DOLN

Services
Preceding station	Pakistan Railways	Following station
Usmanwala towards Lodhran Junction	Lodhran–Raiwind Branch Line	Khudian Khas towards Raiwind Junction
Location

Dholan Halt Railway Station (Urdu: ڈھولن ریلوے اسٹیشن, Punjabi: ڈھولن ریلوے اسٹیشن) is located in Pakistan.

== See also ==
- List of railway stations in Pakistan
- Pakistan Railways
