= Vehari railway station =

Railway station in Pakistan

Vehari Railway Station وہاڑی ریلوے اسٹیشن
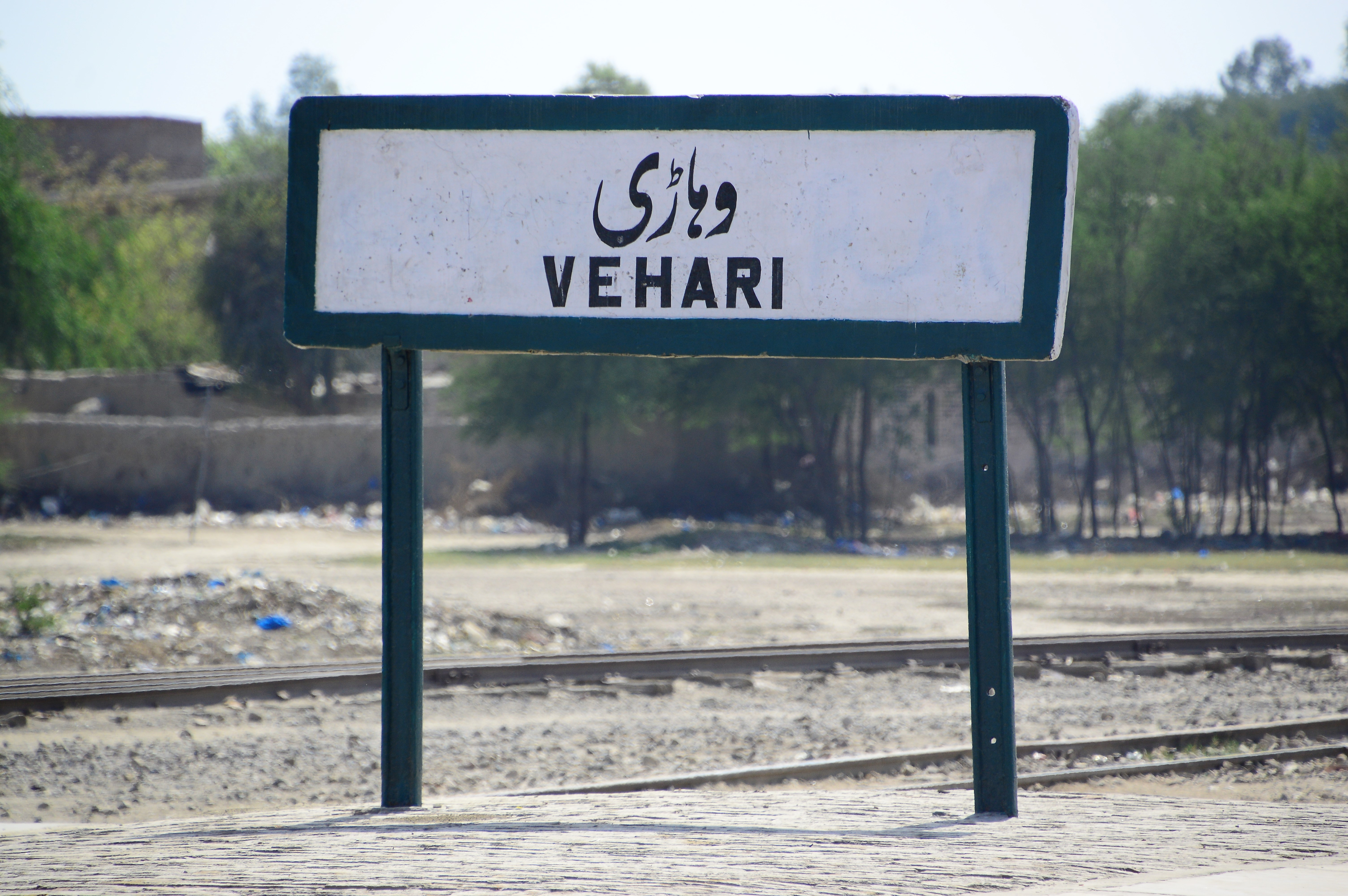

General information
- Coordinates: 30.0451°N 72.3500°E
- Owner: Ministry of Railways

Other information
- Station code: VHR

History
- Opened: 1923

Services
Preceding station	Pakistan Railways	Following station
Zafar Iqbal towards Lodhran Junction	Lodhran–Raiwind Branch Line	Machhianwala towards Raiwind Junction
Location

Vehari Railway Station (Urdu: وہاڑی ریلوے اسٹیشن, Punjabi: وہاڑی ریلوے اسٹیشن) is located in middle of the Vehari, Punjab, Pakistan. The station is staffed and has a booking office.

== Train routes ==
The routes are Vehari from linked with Lahore, Karachi, Hyderabad, Rohri, Khanpur, Bahawalpur, Lodhran, Kasur, Raiwind, Arifwala, Rahim Yar Khan, Burewala, Nawabshah, Pakpattan, Mailsi, and Gaggo. A robust railway system is near to Vehari in Khanewal which has a large railway station and junction.

== Train services from Vehari ==
Train Name	Train Code	Stations
Fareed Express	37 UP, 38 DN	Lahore, Kasur, Pakpattan, Vehari, Bahawalpur, Khanpur, Rahim Yar Khan, Nawabshah, Hyderabad, Karachi
Pakpattan Express	119 UP, 120 DN	Lahore, Raiwind, Kasur, Basirpur, Pakpattan, Arifwala, Vehari, Lodhran, Bahawalpur, Samasata
Kasur Passenger		Lahore,

== See also ==
- Pakistan Railways
- List of railway stations in Pakistan
- Quetta Railway Station
- Rawalpindi Railway Station
- Larkana Railway Station
- Gujar Khan Railway Station
- Mirpur Khas Railway Station
