= Kot Pir Abdul Aziz Halt railway station =

Railway station in Pakistan

General information
- Owner: Ministry of Railways

Other information
- Station code: KPAA

History
- Former names: Great Indian Peninsula Railway

Kot Pir Abdul Aziz Halt railway station (Urdu: کوٹ پیر عبد العزیز ہالٹ ریلوے اسٹیشن) is located in Pakistan. The station is located between Arif Wala and Murad Chishti on the Lodhran–Raiwind Branch Line.

== See also ==
- List of railway stations in Pakistan
- Pakistan Railways
