= Kul Mokal railway station =

Railway station in Pakistan

Kul Mokal Railway Station کُل موکل ریلوے اسٹیشن

General information
- Coordinates: 30.8198°N 74.2018°E
- Owner: Ministry of Railways
- Line: Lodhran–Raiwind Branch Line

Other information
- Station code: KXU

Services
Preceding station	Pakistan Railways	Following station
Basti Qutab towards Lodhran Junction	Lodhran–Raiwind Branch Line	Usmanwala towards Raiwind Junction
Location

Kul Mokal Railway Station (Urdu: کُل موکل ریلوے اسٹیشن, Punjabi: کُل موکل ریلوے اسٹیشن) is located in Pakistan.

== See also ==
- List of railway stations in Pakistan
- Pakistan Railways
