= Dhanote railway station =

Railway station in Pakistan

Dhanote Station دهنوٹ ریلوے اسٹیشن

General information
- Owner: Ministry of Railways
- Line: Lodhran–Raiwind Branch Line

Other information
- Station code: DNE

Services
Preceding station	Pakistan Railways	Following station
Lodhran Junction Terminus	Lodhran–Raiwind Branch Line	Jamraniwah towards Raiwind Junction

Dhanote railway station (Urdu: دهنوٹ ریلوے اسٹیشن, Punjabi: دهنوٹ ریلوے اسٹیشن) is located in Dhanote, Lodhran district of Punjab province, Pakistan.

== See also ==
- List of railway stations in Pakistan
- Pakistan Railways
