= Basti Qutab Halt railway station =

Railway station in Pakistan

Basti Qutab Halt Station بستی قطب ریلوے اسٹیشن

General information
- Owner: Ministry of Railways
- Line: Lodhran–Raiwind Branch Line

Other information
- Station code: BQS

Services
Preceding station	Pakistan Railways	Following station
Kanganpur towards Lodhran Junction	Lodhran–Raiwind Branch Line	Kul Mokal towards Raiwind Junction
Location

Basti Qutab Halt Railway Station (Urdu: بستی قطب ریلوے اسٹیشن, Punjabi: بستی قطب ریلوے اسٹیشن) is located in Pakistan.

== See also ==
- List of railway stations in Pakistan
- Pakistan Railways
