= Kila Dewa Singh Halt railway station =

Railway station in Pakistan

Kila Dewa Halt Singh Station قلعہ دیوا سنگھ ریلوے اسٹیشن

General information
- Owner: Ministry of Railways

Other information
- Station code: KWS

Services
Preceding station	Pakistan Railways	Following station
Haveli Lakha towards Lodhran Junction	Lodhran–Raiwind Branch Line	Basirpur towards Raiwind Junction
Location

Kila Dewa Singh Halt Railway Station (Urdu: قلعہ دیوا سنگھ ریلوے اسٹیشن, Punjabi: قلعہ دیوا سنگھ ریلوے اسٹیشن) is located in Pakistan.

== See also ==
- List of railway stations in Pakistan
- Pakistan Railways
