= Jamraniwah railway station =

Railway station in Punjab, Pakistan

Jamraniwah Station جمرانی واہ ریلوے اسٹیشن

General information
- Coordinates: 29°34′52″N 71°44′44″E
- Owner: Ministry of Railways
- Line: Lodhran–Raiwind Branch Line

Other information
- Station code: JMH

Services
Preceding station	Pakistan Railways	Following station
Dhanote towards Lodhran Junction	Lodhran–Raiwind Branch Line	Kahror Pakka towards Raiwind Junction
Location

Jamraniwah Railway Station (Urdu: جمرانی واہ ریلوے اسٹیشن, Punjabi: جمرانی واہ ریلوے اسٹیشن) is located in Lodhran district, Punjab province, Pakistan.

== History ==
It was founded in 1924 and is named after Bahawalpur's ruler, Jamrani Wah.
