= 5th Gorkha Rifles (Frontier Force) =

Regiment of the Indian Army

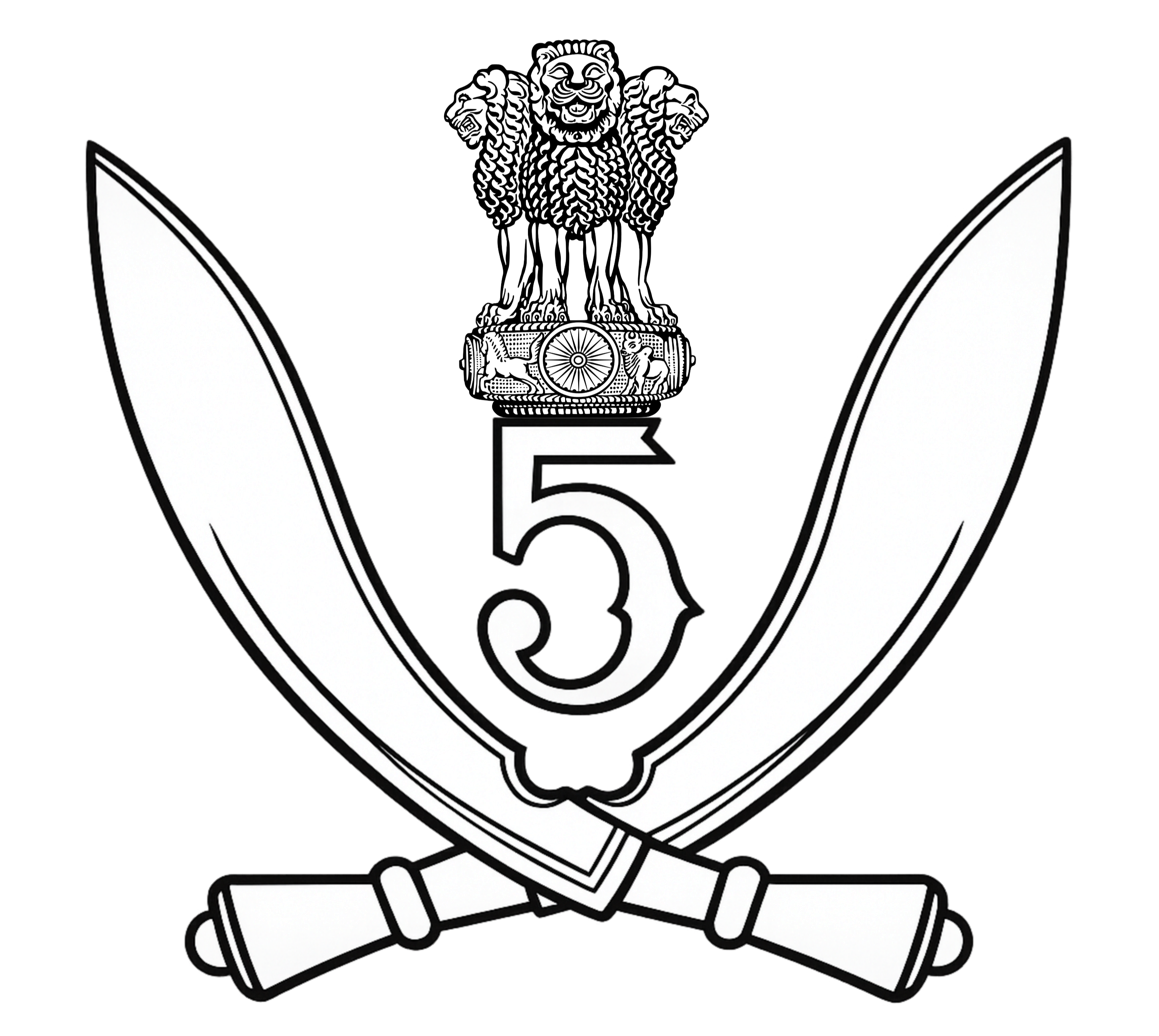
- Cap badge of 5th Gorkha Rifles
- Active: 1858–present
- Country: India
- Branch: Indian Army
- Type: Rifle Regiment
- Role: Infantry
- Size: 6 Battalions
- Regimental Centre: 58 Gorkha Training Centre, Shillong, Meghalaya
- Nicknames: PIFFERs; The Sober Regiment
- Mottos: Shaurya Evam Nistha (Courage and Determination)
- Regimental Colours: Rifle Green and Black
- March: Regimental March: Vir Panch Gorkha; Regimental Song: Panch Gorkha ko Veer Haru; War Cry: Ayo Gorkhali ("The Gorkhas are here")
- Anniversaries: 22 May
- Engagements: The Second Anglo-Afghan War 1878-1880; First World War 1914-1918; The Third Anglo-Afghan War of 1919; Second World War 1939-1945; India–Pakistan war of 1947–1948; Indo-China war of 1962; India–Pakistan war of 1965; India–Pakistan war of 1971
- Battle honours: Post Independence; Zoji La; Kargil; Charwa; Sylhet; Sehjra; Theatre honours Jammu and Kashmir-1947–1948; Punjab-1965; East Pakistan-1971; Jammu and Kashmir-1971; Punjab-1971

Insignia
- Regimental Insignia: A pair of Black crossed Khukris with the floriated numeral 5 in between
- Tartan: Government (pipes and drums)
- Abbreviations: 5 GR(FF)

5th Gorkha Rifles (Frontier Force), also abbreviated as 5 GR(FF) and previously 5th Royal Gurkha Rifles (Frontier Force) is an infantry regiment of the Indian Army comprising Gurkha soldiers of Nepalese origin. It was formed in 1858 as part of the British Indian Army. The regiment's battalions served in the First World War and Second World War (Anglo-Soviet invasion of Iran, Mediterranean, Italian campaign, and in Burma).

The regiment was known as the 5th Royal Gurkha Rifles (Frontier Force) when it was one of the Gurkha regiments that was transferred to the Indian Army following the independence of Indian and Pakistan in 1947 and given its current name in 1950.

Since 1947, the regiment has served in a number of conflicts, including the Indo-Pakistani War of 1965 and the Indo-Pakistani War of 1971. It has also participated in peacekeeping operations in Sri Lanka.

== History ==
=== 19th century ===
The regiment was raised by Major HFM Boisragon in 1858 as the 25th Native Punjab Infantry, also known as the "Hazara Goorkha Battalion". The soldiers of the regiment originated from the Kingdom of Nepal and in 1861 it was renamed the 5th Gurkha Regiment. The regiment's first major action was during the Second Afghan War, where they were awarded their first battle honour at Peiwar Kotal and Captain John Cook was awarded the Victoria Cross. In this conflict, soldier Kishanbir Nagarkoti won the Indian Order of Merit thrice, and a fourth time in the Hazara conflict of 1888. In 1891 the regiment was awarded the prestigious title of a Rifle regiment and became 5th Gurkha (Rifle) Regiment which was shortened to 5th Gurkha Rifles in 1901.

The regiment spent most of its time up to the end of the 19th century based in the Punjab as part of the Punjab Frontier Force (PIF or PIFFER), and its regimental centre was at the frontier hill town of Abbottabad, in the Hazara region of North-West Frontier Province (now Khyber Pakhtunkhwa in Pakistan). This connection was reflected when in 1903, the regiment was renamed the 5th Gurkha Rifles (Frontier Force).

=== First World War ===
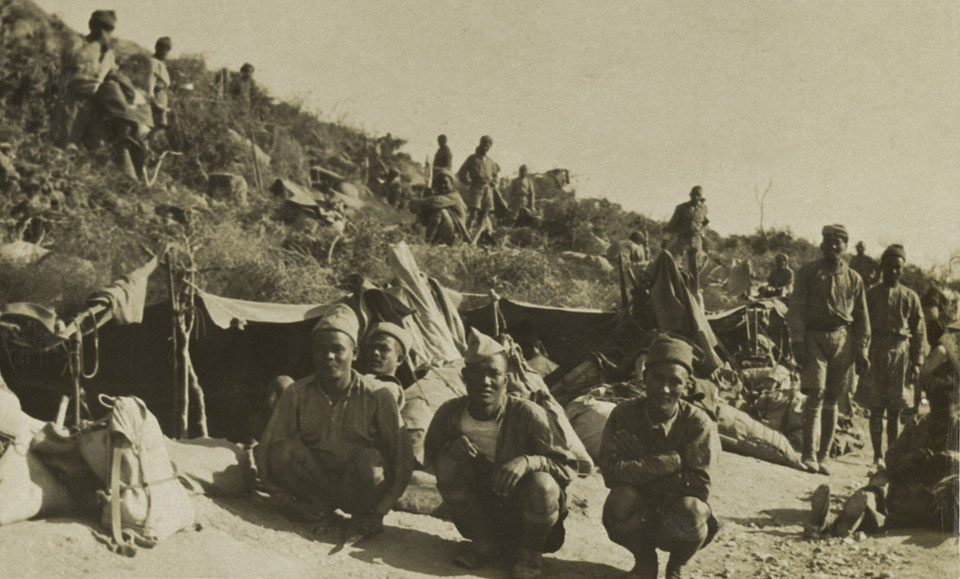
5th Gurkha Rifles in bivouacs at Gallipoli, 1915

During the First World War, the regiment primarily saw service in the Middle East—the 1st Battalion saw extensive and hard service at Gallipoli in 1915 (where seven officers and 129 men were killed in the first few hours after the battalion landed). During the withdrawal, 'C' company of the 1st Battalion, 5th Gurkhas were among the last troops to leave.

The 2nd Battalion initially served in India with the 2nd (Rawalpindi) Division before transferring to Mesopotamia in April 1916 and joining the 42nd Indian Brigade, 15th Indian Division. The 1st Battalion joined them in March 1917 from the 1st (Peshawar) Division and both battalions fought together at the action of Khan Baghdadi. A 3rd Battalion was raised for service on the North-West Frontier at Ferozepore on 28 November 1916, before being disbanded in 1921.

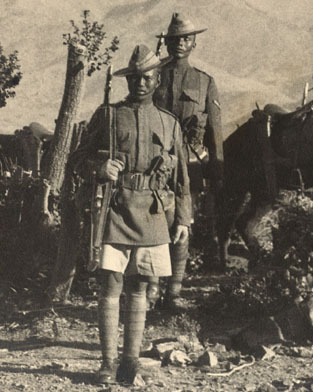
Two soldiers from the 5th Royal Gurkha Rifles Northwest Frontier, India in 1923

=== Inter-War period ===
In 1921, the regiment was given the title the 5th Royal Gurkha Rifles, in recognition of its service during the First World War. During the inter-war period, the regiment received three further battle honours, for the Third Afghan War in 1919, and two for service on the North West Frontier. The regiment together with the 13th Duke of Connaught's Own Lancers were the only units awarded such honours.

=== Second World War ===
During the Second World War, the 1st Battalion, 5th Gurkhas as part of the 8th Indian Infantry Division's 17th Indian Infantry Brigade served in the Mediterranean and Middle East Theatre (including the Italian Campaign). Rifleman Thaman Gurung of the 1st Battalion won the Victoria Cross while serving in Italy.

The 2nd Battalion served in the Far East in the Burma Campaign as part of the 17th Indian Infantry Division and was involved in the retreat of the British Indian Army from Burma; they were also one of four battalions chosen to fight as the rearguard at the Sittang River, which formed the border with India. When the bridge over the river was blown up, preventing the Japanese forces from entering India, many of the regiment were left on the wrong side. The regiment was involved in the re-entry into Burma in 1943 where three members of the regiment were awarded the Victoria Cross. After the war, the 2nd Battalion was issued with new uniforms, equipment and transport and posted to Tokyo in Japan as part of the British Commonwealth Occupation Force.

The 3rd Battalion was re-raised at Abbotabad on 1 October 1940 and served as part of the 37th Indian Infantry Brigade and was involved in the Battle of Imphal although understrength.

The 4th Battalion was raised in 1941 and also served in the Burma Campaign as part of the 7th Indian Infantry Division, fighting in five battles at North Arakan, Buthidaung (Battle of the Admin Box), Kohima, Pakkoku (Irrawaddy) and Sittang. The battalion had the unique distinction of getting four Battle Honours for the five battles fought. Major I. M. Brown of the 4th Battalion was one of the few soldiers of the Second World War who was awarded the Military Cross three times.

The 5th battalion was raised on 1 October 1940 as Third Battalion of the 6th Gurkha Rifles at Abbotabad. On 1 January 1948, the battalion was re-designated as Fifth Battalion of the 5th Gorkha Rifles (Frontier Force). The battalion took part in the Chindit operations in Burma as part of 77 Independent Infantry Brigade. The battalion demonstrated extraordinary bravery in the capture of Mogaung on 23 June 1944, earning two Victoria Crosses in a single day—a rare feat in a single battle.

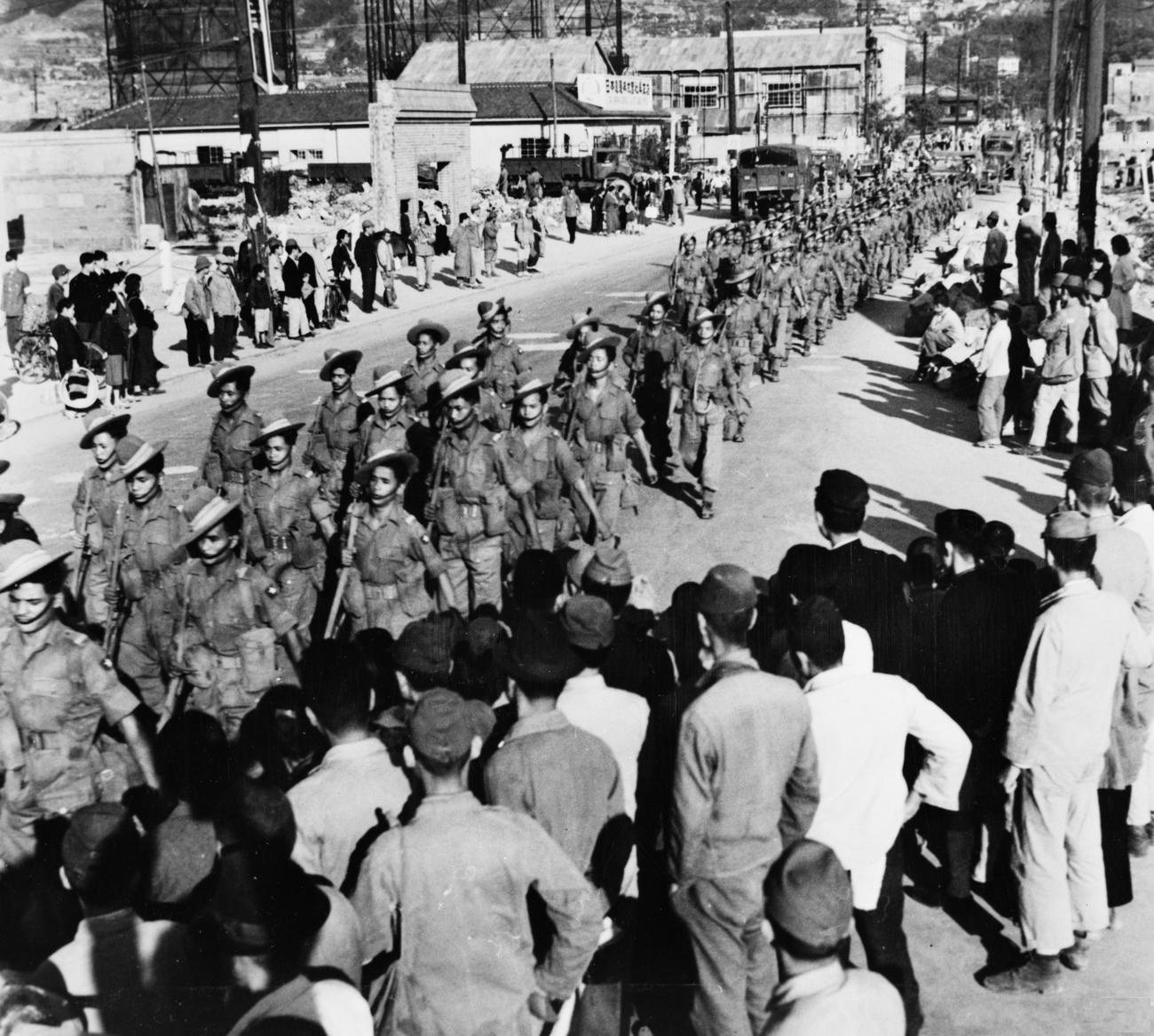
The 2nd Battalion, 5th Royal Gurkha Rifles marching through Kure soon after arriving in Japan to join the British Commonwealth Occupation Force. (May 1946)

=== Post Independence ===
On Independence, the 5th Royal Gurkha Rifles (Frontier Force) was one of the six Gurkha regiments that remained part of the new Indian Army; they were renamed the 5th Gorkha Rifles (Frontier Force) in 1950. The Regiment now has a total of six Battalions and has participated in virtually every major action the Indian Army has undertaken in its four wars with Pakistan, including the first heliborne operations undertaken by the army during the 1971 war. The regiment has participated in the following actions:

- Indo-Pak War of 1947–48
- Indo-Pakistani War of 1965
- Battle of Topa (Jammu and Kashmir)
- Battle of Atgram (East Pakistan) 1971
- Battle of Sylhet (East Pakistan) 1971
- Battle of Gazipur (East Pakistan—Bangladesh) 1971

The 1st and 4th Battalions were also a part of the Indian Peace Keeping Force which served in Sri Lanka and fought against the LTTE. During this deployment, the 4th Battalion's commander, Lieutenant Colonel Bawa, was injured and later died, along with many of his officers and soldiers. The regiment's present headquarters are at Shillong, in North-Eastern India.

== Lineage ==
1858–1861: 25th Punjab Infantry
1861–1891: 5th Gurkha Regiment
1891–1901: 5th Gurkha (Rifle) Regiment
1901–1903: 5th Gurkha Rifles
1903–1921: 5th Gurkha Rifles (Frontier Force)
1921–1950: 5th Royal Gurkha Rifles (Frontier Force)
1950–present: 5th Gorkha Rifles (Frontier Force).

== Regimental Battalions and Affiliations ==
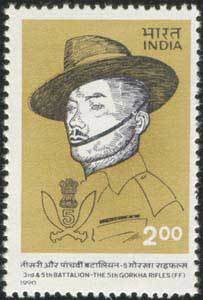
1990 stamp on the 3rd and 5th Battalion of the 5th Gorkha Rifles (FF)

- 1st Battalion: ’FASFIF’ & ’Jethi’ is affiliated to 56 Field Regiment (JITRA) of The Indian Army. 1/5 GR (FF)
- 2nd Battalion: ’SEKINFIF’ (’Victoria Cross Paltan’). 2/5 GR (FF)
- 3rd Battalion: ’THREEFIF’. 3/5 GR ( FF)
- 4th Battalion: ’FOFIFF’ & ’Kanchi’, is affiliated to 110 Helicopter Unit, Indian Air Force. 4/5 GR (FF)
- 5th Battalion: ’FIVFIV’ & ’CHINDITS’ (’Ashok Chakra Paltan‘) 5/5 GR (FF)
- 6th Battalion 6/5 GR ( FF)
- 33 Rashtriya Rifles (58 GR)
- INS Khukri (P49): A 'Khukri'-class corvette of the Indian Navy

== Battle honours ==
- 19th century: Peiwar Kotal, Charasiah, Kabul 1879, Kandahar 1880, Afghanistan 1878–80, Punjab Frontier;
- First World War: Suez Canal, Egypt 1915–16, Khan Baghdadi, Mesopotamia 1916–18, Helles, Krithia, Suvla, Sari Bair, Gallipoli 1915, North West Frontier 1917;
- Inter War Years: Afghanistan 1919, North West Frontier 1930, North West Frontier 1936–39;
- Second World War: The Sangro, Caldari, Cassino II, San Angelo in Teodice, Rocca d'Arce, Ripa Ridge, Femmina Morta, Monte San Bartolo, The Senio, Italy 1943–45, Sittang 1942, Yenangyaung 1942, Buthidaung, Stockades, North Arakan, Chindits 1944, Mogaung, Imphal, Sakawng, Shenam Pass, Bishenpur, The Irrawaddy 1942–45, Sittang 1945, Burma 1942–45;
- Post Independence: Zoji La, Kargil, Jammu and Kashmir 1947–48, Charwa, Punjab 1965, Sylhet, East Pakistan 1971, Jammu and Kashmir 1971, Sehjra, Punjab 1971.

== Gallantry awards ==
The regiment has won the following gallantry awards-

- Victoria Cross - 7
  - Captain John Cook, 1st Battalion: Afghanistan, 2 December 1878 (posthumous)
  - Lieutenant Guy Boisragon, 1st Battalion: Hunza, 2 December 1891
  - Lieutenant John Manners-Smith, 1st Battalion: Hunza, 20 December 1891
  - Havildar Gaje Ghale, 2nd Battalion: Burma, 27 May 1943
  - Naik Agansing Rai, 2nd Battalion: Burma, 26 June 1944
  - Jemadar Netrabahadur Thapa, 2nd Battalion: Burma, 26 June 1944 (posthumous)
  - Rifleman Thaman Gurung, 1st Battalion: Italy, 10 November 1944 (posthumous)
- Ashoka Chakra - 1
  - Naik Narbahadur Thapa, 5th Battalion
- Padma Bhushan - 1
  - Lieutenant General ML Chibber Padma Bhushan, PVSM, AVSM
- Indian Order of Merit - 131
  - Sub Kishanbir Nagarkoti IOM Gold bar, 1st class, 2nd class, 3rd class), 1st Battalion
- Military Cross - 64
- Param Vishisht Seva Medal - 17
- Maha Vir Chakra - 8
  - Lieutenant Colonel Anant Singh Pathania MC, 1st Battalion
  - L/Havildar Ram Prasad Gurung, 1st Battalion
  - Major General H K Sibal
  - Brigadier (Later Lieutenant General) Zorawar Chand Bakshi
  - Brigadier Mohindar Lal Whig
  - Lieutenant Colonel (Later Brigadier) Arun Bhimrao Harolikar, 4th Battalion
  - Rifleman (Later Havildar) Dil Bahadur Chettri, 4th Battalion
  - Lieutenant Colonel Inder Bal Singh Bawa (posthumous), 4th Battalion
- Kirti Chakra - 8
- Uttam Yudh Seva Medal - 2
- Ati Vishisht Seva Medal - 21
- Vir Chakra - 23
- Shaurya Chakra - 13
- Yudh Seva Medal - 4
- Sena Medal - 116
- Vishisht Seva Medal - 36
- Mentioned-in-Despatches - 27
- MacGregor Medal - 4
- Commander Degree of Legion of Merit - 1

== Regimental Crest ==
The regimental crest has undergone several changes. At raising, the crest consisted of an eight pointed star, inscribed with a garter and the number 25 in the centre (signifying the 25th Punjab Infantry), and the whole mounted by a Tudor Crown. In 1861, following the change of the regiment's title to 5th Goorkha Regiment, the crest was modified to two khukris pointing upwards, with the number 5 written above the crossing of the handles of the khukris. In 1880, the number 5 was floriated and this badge was worn till 1925. In 1921, with the ‘Royal’ title, officers wore the crest superimposed by a Tudor Crown. The Imperial Lion was superimposed on the Tudor Crown from 1927 to distinguish its Royal Status. When India became a republic on 26 January 1950, the crown and lion were replaced by the Lion Capital of Ashoka. Interestingly, badges were never worn on the Gorkha Hat, as the double green band was enough to distinguish the 5th from other regiments.

== Notable Officers ==
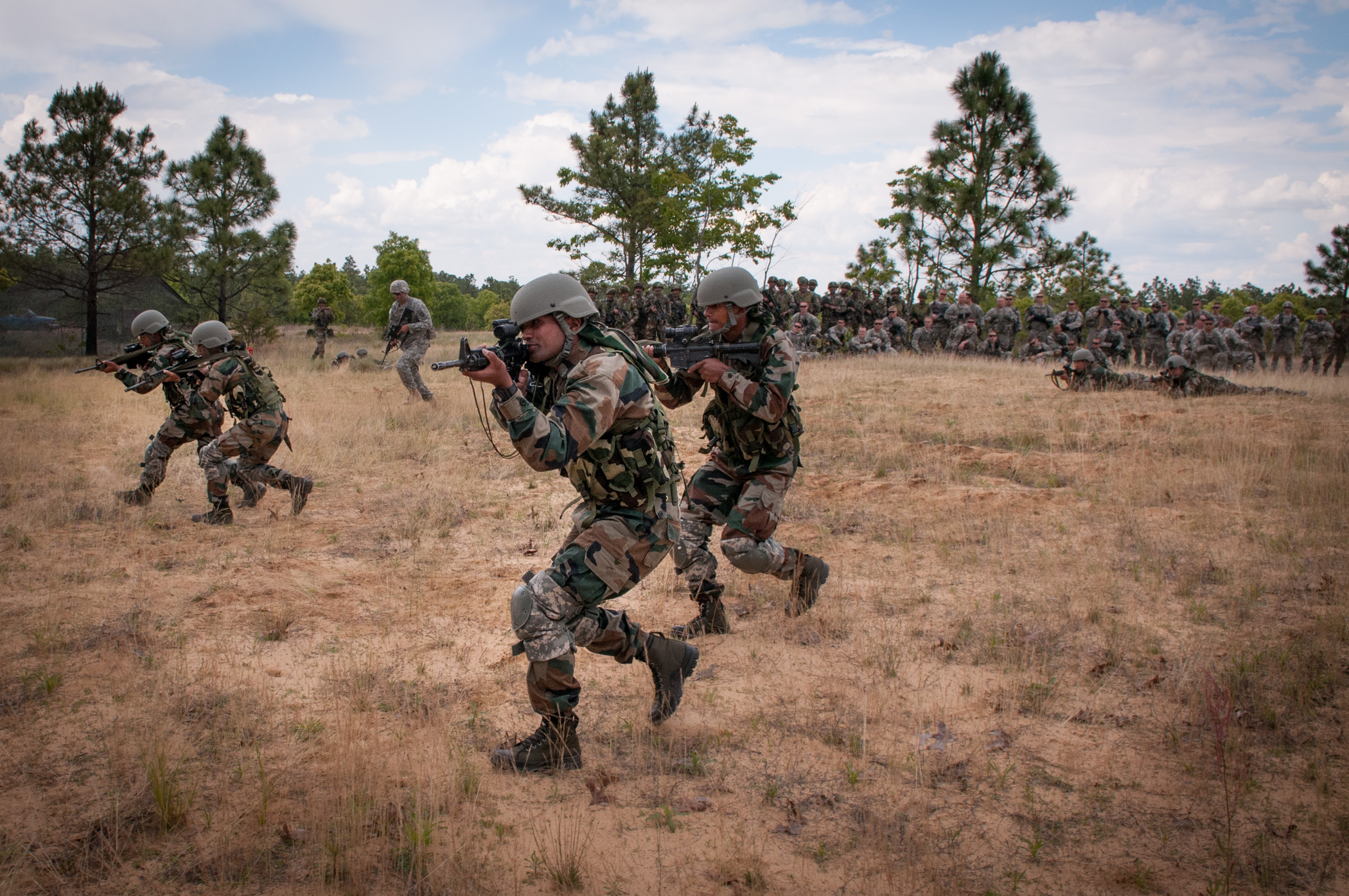
Soldiers of the 99th Mountain Brigade's 2nd Battalion, 5 Gorkha Rifles, during Yudh Abhyas 2013

- Field Marshal Sir Arthur Arnold Barrett GCB, GCSI, KCVO, ADC
- Lieutenant General FN Billimoria PVSM, ADC
- General Dalbir Singh Suhag PVSM, UYSM, AVSM, VSM, ADC
- Lieutenant General Zorawar Chand ‘Zoru’ Bakshi PVSM, MVC, VrC, VSM
- Lieutenant General S. K. Sinha PVSM (Ex Governor of Jammu & Kashmir and Assam)
- Lieutenant General ML Chibber Padma Bhushan, PVSM, AVSM
- Major General Ian Cardozo AVSM, SM
- Major General Nasib Singh Katoch AVSM, SM, VSM and Bar
- Lieutenant General Richard Khare PVSM, AVSM, SM, VSM
- Major General S. K. Khajuria AVSM, VSM

== See also ==
- Abbottabad
- Gorkha regiments (India)
- Royal Gurkha Rifles
- St. Luke's Church, Abbottabad
- Giri Prasad Burathoki
