= Gul Sher railway station =

Railway station in Pakistan

Gul Sher Railway Station گل شیر ریلوے اسٹیشن

General information
- Owner: Ministry of Railways

Other information
- Station code: GLS

Services
| Preceding station | Pakistan Railways | Following station |
|---|---|---|
| Basirpur towards Lodhran Junction | Lodhran–Raiwind Branch Line | Rasulpur Halt towards Raiwind Junction |
Location

Gul Sher Railway Station (Urdu: گل شیر ریلوے اسٹیشن, Punjabi: گل شیر ریلوے اسٹیشن) is located in Pakistan.

== See also ==
- List of railway stations in Pakistan
- Pakistan Railways
