= Maulviwla Halt railway station =

Railway station in Pakistan

Maulviwla Halt Railway Station مولوی والا ریلوے اسٹیشن

General information
- Owner: Ministry of Railways
- Line: Lodhran–Raiwind Branch Line

Other information
- Station code: MLVA

Services
Preceding station	Pakistan Railways	Following station
Chah Noor Mohammad towards Lodhran Junction	Lodhran–Raiwind Branch Line	Chak Kambo towards Raiwind Junction
Location

Maulviwla Halt Railway Station (Urdu: مولوی والا ریلوے اسٹیشن, Punjabi: مولوی والا ریلوے اسٹیشن) is located in Pakistan.

== See also ==
- List of railway stations in Pakistan
- Pakistan Railways
