= Khudian Khas railway station =

Railway station in Pakistan

Khudian Khas Station کھڈیاں خاص ریلوے اسٹیشن

General information
- Coordinates: 30.9913°N 74.2729°E
- Owner: Ministry of Railways
- Line: Lodhran–Raiwind Branch Line
- Platforms: 1
- Tracks: 2

Other information
- Station code: KHUK

Services
Preceding station	Pakistan Railways	Following station
Dholan towards Lodhran Junction	Lodhran–Raiwind Branch Line	Roshan Billa towards Raiwind Junction
Location

Khudian Khas Railway Station (Urdu: کھوڈیاں خاص ریلوے اسٹیشن, Punjabi: کھوڈیاں خاص ریلوے اسٹیشن) is located in town of Khudian, Pakistan.

== History ==
Khudian Khas railway station was constructed in 1904, but it was destroyed in the 1971 Indo-Pak war. In 1972, the station's building was re-built and later in 2009, the station's building was renovated.

== See also ==
- List of railway stations in Pakistan
- Pakistan Railways
