= Athilpur railway station =

Railway station in Pakistan

Athilpur Railway Station اتھل پور ریلوے اسٹیشن

General information
- Owner: Ministry of Railways
- Line: Lodhran–Raiwind Branch Line

Other information
- Station code: AHU

Services
Preceding station	Pakistan Railways	Following station
Kasur Junction towards Lodhran Junction	Lodhran–Raiwind Branch Line	Raokhanwala towards Raiwind Junction
Location

Athilpur Railway Station (Urdu and Punjabi: اتھل پور ریلوے اسٹیشن) is located in Pakistan.

== See also ==
- List of railway stations in Pakistan
- Pakistan Railways
