= Pakpattan railway station =

Railway station in Pakistan

Pakpattan Railway Station پاکپتن ریلوے اسٹیشن

General information
- Coordinates: 30.3549°N 73.3952°E
- Owner: Ministry of Railways
- Line: Lodhran–Raiwind Branch Line
- Platforms: 1

Construction
- Parking: 100 cars

Other information
- Station code: PPX

History
- Opened: 1924

Passengers
- 2019: 12090

Services
Preceding station	Pakistan Railways	Following station
Murad Chishti towards Lodhran Junction	Lodhran–Raiwind Branch Line	Chah Noor Mohammad towards Raiwind Junction
Location

Pakpattan Railway Station (Urdu: پاکپتن ریلوے اسٹیشن, Punjabi: پاکپتن ریلوے اسٹیشن) is located in District Pakpattan, Punjab, Pakistan.

== Route ==
This Railway Station is situated on Kasur, Vehari and Lodhran Railway Track. Other Railway facilities are Locomotive shed, Railway Hospital, Turntable (railroad). Fareed Express is only express train running on this track.

== See also ==
- List of railway stations in Pakistan
- Pakistan Railways
