= Raokhan wala railway station =

Railway station in Pakistan

Coordinates: 31.189222°N 74.327375°E

Raokhan wala Station راؤ خان والا ریلوے اسٹیشن

General information
- Owner: Ministry of Railways
- Line: Lodhran–Raiwind Branch Line

Other information
- Station code: RKW

Services
| Preceding station | Pakistan Railways | Following station |
|---|---|---|
| Athilpur towards Lodhran Junction | Lodhran–Raiwind Branch Line | Raja Jang towards Raiwind Junction |
Location

Raokhan wala Railway Station (Urdu and Punjabi: راؤخانوالا ریلوے اسٹیشن) is located in Pakistan.

== See also ==
- List of railway stations in Pakistan
- Pakistan Railways
