= Haji Chand Halt railway station =

Railway station in Pakistan

Haji Chand Halt Station حاجی چاند ریلوے اسٹیشن

General information
- Coordinates: 30.6987°N 74.0692°E
- Owner: Ministry of Railways
- Line: Lodhran–Raiwind Branch Line

Other information
- Station code: HJC

Services
Preceding station	Pakistan Railways	Following station
Mandi Ahmed Abad towards Lodhran Junction	Lodhran–Raiwind Branch Line	Kanganpur towards Raiwind Junction
Location

Haji Chand Halt Railway Station (Urdu: حاجی چاند ریلوے اسٹیشن, Punjabi: حاجی چاند ریلوے اسٹیشن) is located in Pakistan.

== See also ==
- List of railway stations in Pakistan
- Pakistan Railways
