= Ashraf Shah railway station =

Railway station in Pakistan

Ashraf Shah Railway Station اشرف شاہ ریلوے اسٹیشن

General information
- Coordinates: 29.7555°N 72.1097°E
- Owner: Ministry of Railways
- Line: Lodhran–Raiwind Branch Line

Other information
- Station code: AFS

Services
Preceding station	Pakistan Railways	Following station
Kahror Pakka towards Lodhran Junction	Lodhran–Raiwind Branch Line	Mailsi towards Raiwind Junction
Location
- Location within Punjab, Pakistan Location within Pakistan

Ashraf Shah Railway Station (Urdu: اشرف شاہ ریلوے اسٹیشن) is located in Pakistan.

== See also ==
- List of railway stations in Pakistan
- Pakistan Railways
