= Zafar Iqbal railway station =

Railway station in Punjab, Pakistan

Zafar Iqbal Railway Station ظفر اقبال ریلوے اسٹیشن

General information
- Coordinates: 30.0083°N 72.2803°E
- Owner: Ministry of Railways
- Line: Lodhran-Raiwind Branch Line

Other information
- Station code: ZBL

Services
Preceding station	Pakistan Railways	Following station
Nur Shah towards Lodhran Junction	Lodhran–Raiwind Branch Line	Vehari towards Raiwind Junction
Location
- Location within Pakistan

Zafar Iqbal Railway Station (Urdu: ظفر اقبال ریلوے اسٹیشن) is located in Punjab, Pakistan.

== See also ==
- List of railway stations in Pakistan
- Pakistan Railways
