= Chak Kambo railway station =

Railway station in Pakistan

Coordinates: 30.427551°N 73.596141°E

Chak Kambo Station چک کمبو ریلوے اسٹیشن

General information
- Owner: Ministry of Railways
- Line: Lodhran–Raiwind Branch Line

Other information
- Station code: CKQ

Services
Preceding station	Pakistan Railways	Following station
Maulviwla towards Lodhran Junction	Lodhran–Raiwind Branch Line	Haveli Wasawewala towards Raiwind Junction
Location

Chak Kambo Railway Station (Urdu: چک کمبو ریلوے اسٹیشن, Punjabi: چک کمبو ریلوے اسٹیشن) (CKQ) is located in Pakistan.

The Chak is also regarded as a prominent sub-branch of the ancient Persian-origin Kamboja tribe. According to the Mahabharata and several early historical traditions, the Kamboja people established a kingdom around 600 BCE in the region corresponding to present-day Gilgit-Baltistan and Kashmir, with its capital located in what is now Rajouri (Azad Kashmir).

Archaeological remains, cultural traces, and structural ruins attributed to this early Kamboja state are still found across various parts of Gilgit-Baltistan, reflecting the historical depth and enduring legacy of this ancient polity.

== See also ==
- List of railway stations in Pakistan
- Pakistan Railways
