= Khai (disambiguation) =

Khai may refer to

- Khai, village in Punjab, Pakistan
- Khai Hithar, village in Punjab, Pakistan
- Khai Khurd, village in Punjab, Pakistan
- KLUU, a radio station (103.5 FM) licensed to serve Wahiawa, Hawaii, United States, which held the call sign KHAI from 2005 to 2015
- Fa Khai, king of Lan Xang
