= Basirpur railway station =

Railway station in Pakistan

Basirpur Railway Station بصیر پور ریلوے اسٹیشن

General information
- Coordinates: 30.5767°N 73.8398°E
- Owner: Ministry of Railways
- Line: Lodhran–Raiwind Branch Line

Other information
- Station code: BSU

Services
| Preceding station | Pakistan Railways | Following station |
|---|---|---|
| Kila Dewa Singh towards Lodhran Junction | Lodhran–Raiwind Branch Line | Gul Sher towards Raiwind Junction |
Location

Basirpur Railway Station (Urdu: بصیر پور ریلوے اسٹیشن, Punjabi: بصیر پور ریلوے اسٹیشن) is located in Pakistan.

== See also ==
- List of railway stations in Pakistan
- Pakistan Railways
