= Raja Jang railway station =

Railway station in Pakistan

Raja Jang Railway Station راجہ جنگ ریلوے اسٹیشن

General information
- Coordinates: 31.222°N 74.258°E
- Owner: Ministry of Railways
- Line: Lodhran–Raiwind Branch Line

Other information
- Station code: RJJ

Services
Preceding station	Pakistan Railways	Following station
Raokhanwala towards Lodhran Junction	Lodhran–Raiwind Branch Line	Raiwind Junction Terminus
Location

Raja Jang Railway Station (Urdu and Punjabi: راجہ جنگ ریلوے اسٹیشن) is located in town of Raja Jang, Kasur District, Pakistan.

== See also ==
- List of railway stations in Pakistan
- Pakistan Railways
