= Ian Cardozo =

Former Indian Army officer

Major General Ian Cardozo AVSM SM
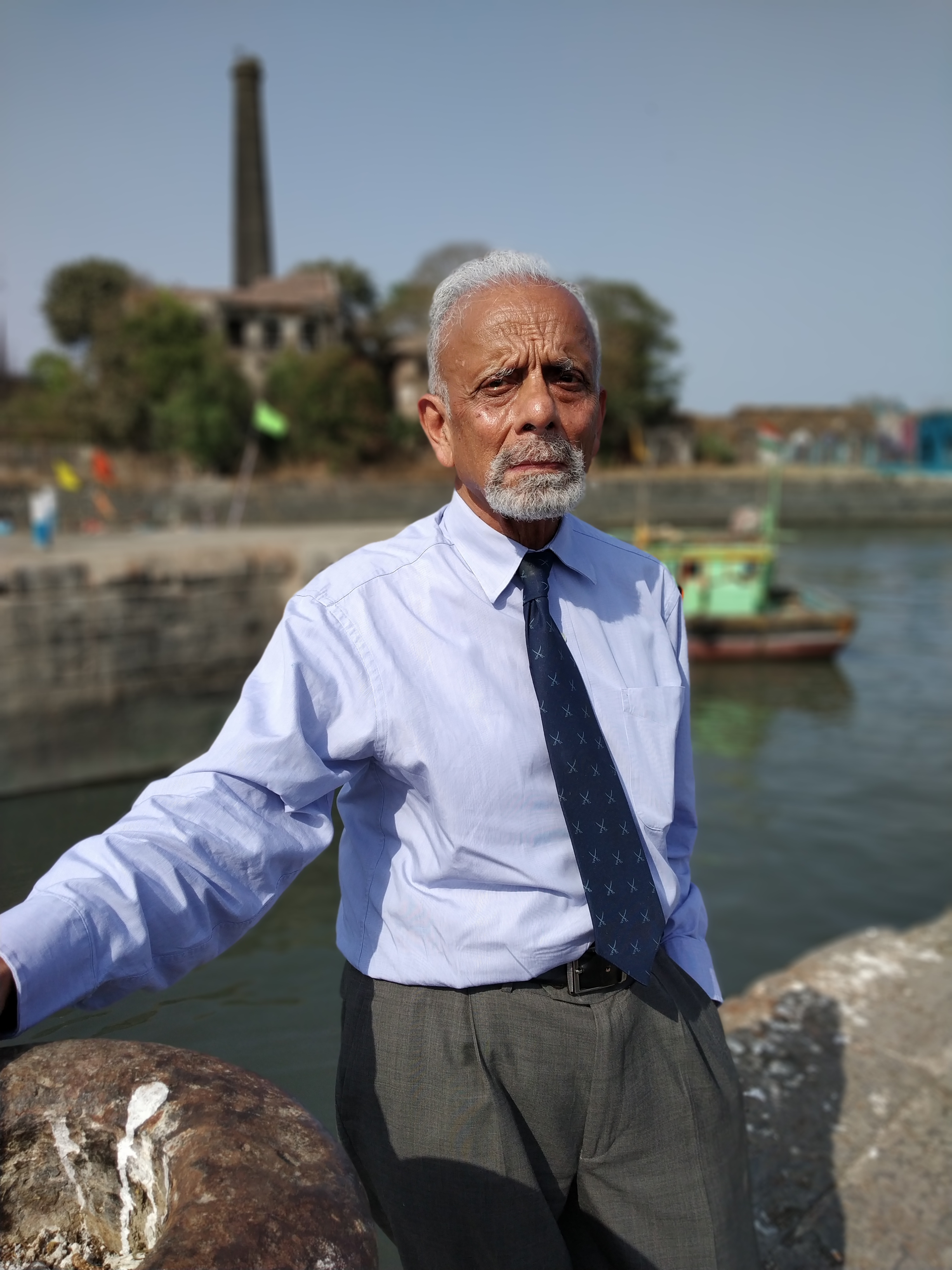
- Born: 7 August 1937 (age 89); Bombay, Bombay Presidency, British India
- Spouse: Priscilla Cardozo
- Children: 3
- Military career
- Allegiance: India
- Branch: Indian Army
- Service years: 1954–1993
- Rank: Major General
- Nickname: Cartoos Sahib
- Service number: IC-10407
- Units: 1/5 Gorkha Rifles(FF); 4/5 Gorkha Rifles(FF)
- Commands: 1/5 Gorkha Rifles(FF)
- Conflicts: Indo-Pakistani War of 1971; Battle of Sylhet
- Awards: Ati Vishisht Seva Medal; Sena Medal
- Other work: Former Chairman – Rehabilitation Council of India; Trustee – National Centre for Promotion of Employment for Disabled People

Major General Ian Cardozo AVSM SM is a former Indian Army officer. He was the first war-disabled officer of the Indian Army to command a battalion and a brigade. He is an amputee due to a war injury.

== Early life ==
Ian Cardozo was born to Vincent Cardozo and Diana Cardozo (née de Souza) in 1937 in Bombay, Bombay Presidency, British India. He studied at St. Xavier's High School, Fort and St. Xavier's College, Mumbai.

== Military career ==
Cardozo graduated from the National Defence Academy and then attended the Indian Military Academy, from where he was commissioned into & later commanded the 1st Battalion of 5 Gorkha Rifles (Frontier Force) or 1/5 GR (FF) He has also served with 4/ 5 Gorkha Rifles and has fought two wars alongside them-Indo-Pakistani War of 1965 and the Indo-Pakistani War of 1971. He is the first NDA cadet to receive both gold and silver medals. The gold medal is given to the cadet of the passing out course for best all round performance.

The silver medal is given to the cadet who is first in order of merit. For the first time in the history of the National Defence Academy, the cadet who was awarded the gold medal was also first in order of merit. This has happened only one more time thereafter.(source :General himself and from his profile)

=== Indo-Pakistani War of 1971 ===
At the outbreak of the Indo-Pakistani War of 1971, Cardozo was attending a course at the Defence Services Staff College, Wellington. His battalion, 4/5 Gorkha Rifles, was already deployed in the eastern theatre of operations. The battalion's second-in-command was killed in action and Cardozo was ordered to replace him. He arrived at his battalion in time to accompany them on the Indian Army's first heliborne operation during the battle of Sylhet. He was popularly named Cartoos sahib by his Gorkha regiment as they found it difficult to pronounce his first name. Cartoos means a cartridge in Hindi.

After the fall of Dhaka, Cardozo stepped on a land mine and his leg was critically injured. Due to non-availability of morphine or pethidine, and absence of medics, his leg could not be amputated surgically. He subsequently used his khukri to amputate his own leg. Afterwards, his unit captured a Pakistan Army surgeon, Maj. Mohammad Basheer, who operated on Cardozo. However, the veracity of the account has been questioned by Brigadier (Retd) Rattan Kaul stating that Cardozo stepped on a mine set up by his own forces, hence was a battle accident casualty and was brought to battalion medical post and Captain DK Sengupta, Regimental Medical Officer was the one who cut the hanging ligament. Later, a Pakistani surgeon amputated his ankle in a Pakistani hospital in Sylhet. According to Rattan Kaul, there were several witnesses to the event. Rattan Kaul's version was also produced at the instance of Press Council of India in newspaper, The Hindu on August 2, 2023.

=== Later career ===
After his amputation, Cardozo had a wooden leg. Despite this, he maintained his physical fitness levels and beat a number of able-bodied officers in battle physical fitness tests. He then put his case to the Chief of Army Staff at the time, Gen. Tapishwar Narain Raina, who then asked Cardozo to accompany him to Ladakh. After observing that Cardozo could still walk in the mountains through snow and ice, Gen. Raina allowed him to command a battalion. A similar situation occurred when he was to take command of a brigade. He was promoted to Brigadier on 1 March 1984.

=== Military awards and decorations ===

Ati Vishisht Seva Medal		Sena Medal	
Wound Medal	General Service Medal		Samar Seva Medal
Poorvi Star	Raksha Medal	Sangram Medal	Sainya Seva Medal
25th Anniversary of Independence Medal	30 Years Long Service Medal	20 Years Long Service Medal	9 Years Long Service Medal

== Personal life ==
Cardozo is married to Priscilla and has three sons. He currently resides in New Delhi.

He served as the Chairman of Rehabilitation Council of India from 2005 to 2011. He is also a marathon runner, and regularly takes part in the Mumbai marathon on his prosthetic limb.

== Bibliography ==
He authored several books on military history of India:-

- Bhartiya Sena Ka Gauravshali Itihas ISBN 8173155372
- India in World War I: An Illustrated Story ISBN 9789384898502
- Lieutenant General Bilimoria: His Life & Times
- Param Vir: Our Heroes in Battle ISBN 9351940292
- Paramvir Chakra : Manojpandey ISBN 8174369007
- Somnath Sharma: Hero of the Battle of Badgam in 1947 who Helped Prevent the Fall of Srinagar ISBN 8174369236
- Shaitan Singh: Incredible Heroism Displayed by a Small Group Against Hordes of Chinese in the Battle of Rezang La in 1962 ISBN 8174369155
- The Bravest of the Brave: The Extraordinary Story of Indian VCs of World War I ISBN 9789386141767
- The Indian Army: A Brief History ISBN 8190209701
- The Sinking of INS Khukri: Survivor's Stories ISBN 9351940993
- 1971 - Stories of Grit and Glory from the Indo-Pak War ISBN 9780143454557

== See also ==
- F. N. Billimoria
- Yogendra Singh Yadav
- Zorawar Chand Bakhshi
