= Mandi Burewala railway station =

Railway station in Pakistan

Mandi Burewala Station منڈی بُورے والا ریلوے اسٹیشن

General information
- Owner: Ministry of Railways
- Line: Lodhran–Raiwind Branch Line

Other information
- Station code: MBWL

Services
Preceding station	Pakistan Railways	Following station
Machhianwala towards Lodhran Junction	Lodhran–Raiwind Branch Line	Gaggoo towards Raiwind Junction
Location

Mandi Burewala Railway Station (Urdu: منڈی بُورے والا ریلوے اسٹیشن, Punjabi: منڈی بورے والا ریلوے اسٹیشن) is located in Pakistan.

== See also ==
- List of railway stations in Pakistan
- Pakistan Railways
