= Rajowal Nau =

- Town
- Location within Pakistan
- Coordinates: 30°56′56″N 73°44′36″E
- Country: Pakistan
- Province: Punjab
- District: Kasur
- Time zone: UTC+5 (PST)

Rajowal Nau or New Rajowal is a town and Union Council of Kasur District in the Punjab province of Pakistan. The name Rajowal Nau originated from Rajowal Kuhna located between Khudian and Chunian on the Grand Trunk Road, built by Sher Shah Suri. The Mosque of Rajowal Kuhna has a unique Mughal structure, built by General Shahbaz Khan Kamboh, a general of Mughal Emperor Akbar. It is part of Kasur Tehsil and is located at 30°52'60N 74°17'60E with an altitude of 179 metres (590 feet).

== See also ==
- Rajowal
