= Usmanwala railway station =

Railway station in Pakistan

Usmanwala Station عُثمان والا ریلوے اسٹیشن

General information
- Coordinates: 30.897°N 74.238°E
- Owner: Ministry of Railways
- Line: Lodhran–Raiwind Branch Line

Other information
- Station code: UMW

Services
Preceding station	Pakistan Railways	Following station
Kul Mokal towards Lodhran Junction	Lodhran–Raiwind Branch Line	Dholan towards Raiwind Junction
Location

Usmanwala Railway Station (Urdu: عُثمان والا ریلوے اسٹیشن, Punjabi: عُثمان والا ریلوے اسٹیشن) is located in town of Usman Wala, Kasur District, Pakistan.

== See also ==
- List of railway stations in Pakistan
- Pakistan Railways
