= Kahror Pakka railway station =

Railway station in Punjab, Pakistan

Kahror Pakka Station کہروڑ پکّا ریلوے اسٹیشن

General information
- Coordinates: 29.6283°N 71.8990°E
- Owner: Ministry of Railways
- Line: Lodhran–Raiwind Branch Line

Other information
- Station code: KQP

Services
Preceding station	Pakistan Railways	Following station
Dhanote towards Lodhran Junction	Lodhran–Raiwind Branch Line	Ashraf Shah towards Raiwind Junction
Location

Kahror Pakka Railway Station (Urdu: کہروڑ پکّا ریلوے اسٹیشن, Punjabi: کہروڑ پکّا ریلوے اسٹیشن) is located in Pakistan.

== See also ==
- List of railway stations in Pakistan
- Pakistan Railways
