= Gagoo railway station =

Railway station in Pakistan

Gagoo Railway Station گگو ریلوے اسٹیشن

General information
- Owner: Ministry of Railways
- Line: Lodhran–Raiwind Branch Line

Other information
- Station code: GOO

History
- Opened: 1924

Services
Preceding station	Pakistan Railways	Following station
Mandi Burewala towards Lodhran Junction	Lodhran–Raiwind Branch Line	Arif Wala towards Raiwind Junction
Location

Gagoo Railway Station (Urdu: گگو ریلوے اسٹیشن, Punjabi: گگو ریلوے اسٹیشن) is located in Pakistan. Only one train, the Farid Express, which comes from Lahore, passes through here.

== See also ==
- List of railway stations in Pakistan
- Pakistan Railways
