= Kasur Tehsil =

Kasur Tehsil تحصِيل قصُور
- Tehsil
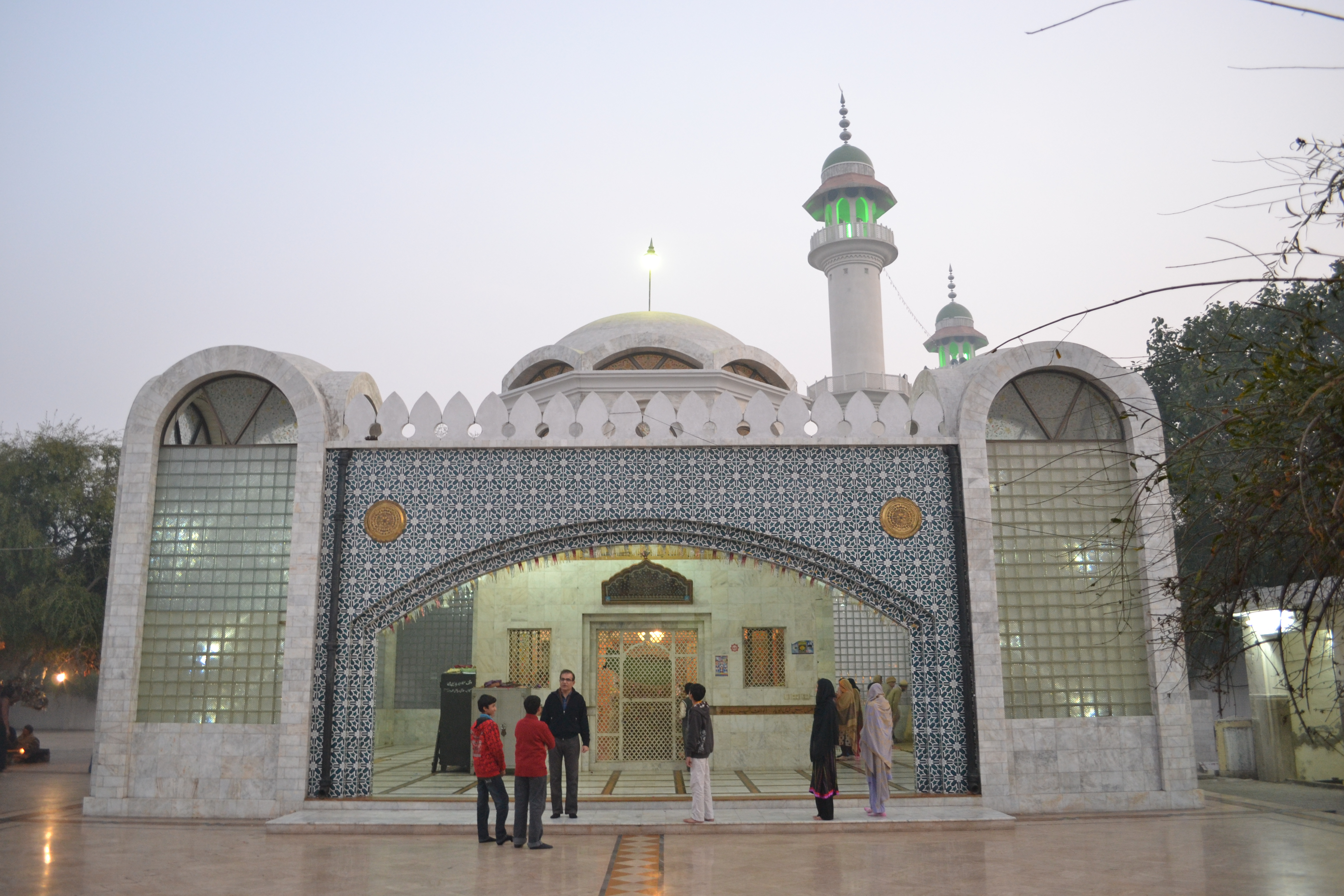
- Country: Pakistan
- Region: Punjab
- District: Kasur District
- Capital: Kasur
- Towns: 3
- Union councils: 55

Population (2017)
  - Tehsil: 1,334,653
  - Urban: 488,741
  - Rural: 845,912
- Time zone: UTC+5 (PST)
  - Summer (DST): UTC+6 (PDT)

Kasur (Urdu: تحصِيل قصُور), is an administrative subdivision (tehsil) of Kasur District in the Punjab province of Pakistan. The city of Kasur is the headquarters of the tehsil.

== Administration ==
The tehsil of Kasur is administratively subdivided into 55 Union Councils, these are:

- Babliana Otar
- Bahadurpura
- Baroon Raja Jang
- Bazidpur
- Bhamba Kalan
- Bedian Kalan
- Bheela Hithar
- Chak 55
- Chathian Wala
- Cheena Arla
- Daftuh
- Dholan Hithar
- Sher Kot
- Dholan
- Fatehpur
- Gauhar Jageer
- Herdo Sabari
- Hindal
- Hussain Khan Wala
- Dhing Shah
- Ibrahimabad
- Kasur-1
- Kasur-2
- Kasur-3
- Kasur-4
- Kasur-5
- Kasur-6
- Kasur-7
- Kasur-8
- Kasur-9
- Kasur-10
- Kasur-11
- Khai Hithar
- Khara
- Khudian Khas
- Khudian Baroon

∗Kacha Pacca, ∗Sanda Kalan, ∗ Marley

- Kotli Rai Abubakr
- Maan
- Matta
- Mudke Dhariwal
- Mustafaabad No 1
- Mustafaabad No 2
- Nathoki
- Aulakh Hithar
- Aulakh OtarUC 36
- Aurara
- Pial Kalan
- Qadiwind
- Raja Jang
- Rajowal Nau
- Rao Khan Wala
- Sehjra
- Sheikh Umad Kohna
- Sirhali Kalan
- Usmanwala
- Zafarke

== See also ==
- Kasur District
