= CKQ =

CKQ or ckq may refer to:

- Chak Kambo railway station, Pakistan, station code CKQ
- Kajakse language of Chad, ISA 639-3 code ckq

== See also ==
- , including several airports CKQ-
