= Mailsi railway station =

Pakistan railway station

Mailsi Railway Station میلسی ریلوے اسٹیشن
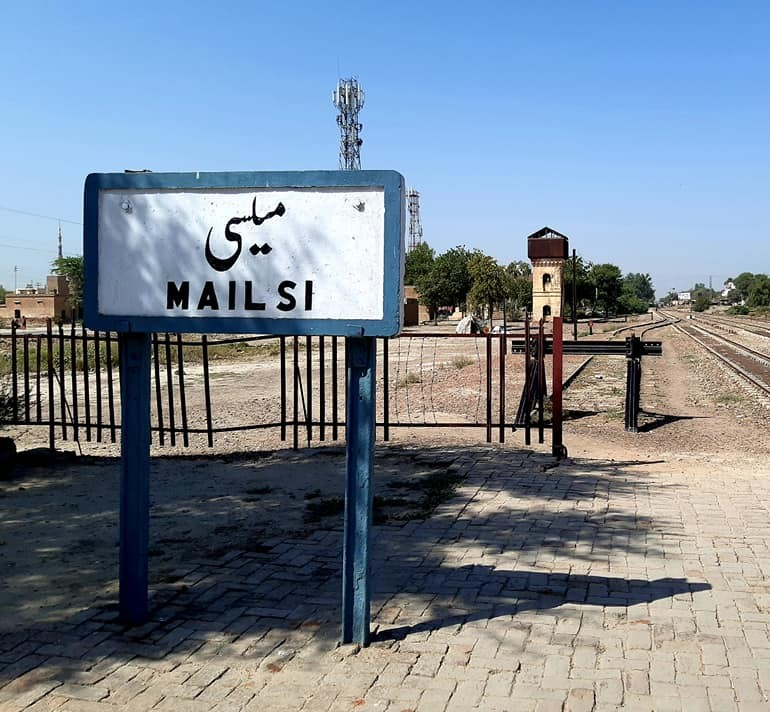

General information
- Coordinates: 29.8072°N 72.1771°E
- Owner: Ministry of Railways
- Line: Lodhran–Raiwind Branch Line

Other information
- Station code: MSX

Services
Preceding station	Pakistan Railways	Following station
Ashraf Shah towards Lodhran Junction	Lodhran–Raiwind Branch Line	Nur Shah towards Raiwind Junction
Location

Mailsi Railway Station (Urdu: میلسی ریلوے اسٹیشن, Punjabi: میلسی ریلوے اسٹیشن) is located in Pakistan.

== See also ==
- List of railway stations in Pakistan
- Pakistan Railways
