= Rasool Pur, Kasur =

Rasool Pur رسول پور Akikey Rasool Pur/Akki Ki Rasool Pura
- Town
- Location of Rasool Pur Rasool Pur (Pakistan)
- Coordinates: 31°06′35″N 74°21′43″E
- Country: Pakistan
- Province: Punjab
- District: Kasur
- Tehsil: Kasur
- Number of Union Councils: 1

Area
  - Total: 1.9 sq mi (5 km^{2})

Population
  - Estimate (2017): 5,618
- Time zone: UTC+05:00 (Pakistan Standard Time)
- Calling code: 049

Rasool Pur (Urdu: رسول پور) also known as Akikey Rasool Pur which also spell as a Akki Ki Rasool Pura , is a town and Union Council of Kasur District in the Punjab province of Pakistan.
