= Mandi Ahmed Abad railway station =

Railway station in Pakistan

Mandi Ahmed Abad Station منڈی احمد آباد ریلوے اسٹیشن

General information
- Coordinates: 30.6568°N 74.0302°E
- Owner: Ministry of Railways
- Line: Lodhran–Raiwind Branch Line

Other information
- Station code: MADD

Services
Preceding station	Pakistan Railways	Following station
Rasulpur Halt towards Lodhran Junction	Lodhran–Raiwind Branch Line	Haji Chand towards Raiwind Junction
Location

Mandi Ahmed Abad Railway Station (Urdu: منڈی احمد آباد ریلوے اسٹیشن, Punjabi: منڈی احمد آباد ریلوے اسٹیشن) is located in Pakistan.

== See also ==
- List of railway stations in Pakistan
- Pakistan Railways
