= Mir Muhammad (UC) =

Mir Muhammad میر محمد Mir Mohammad
- Town
- Location of Mir Muhammad Mir Muhammad (Pakistan)
- Coordinates: 31°22′56″N 74°30′16″E
- Country: Pakistan
- Province: Punjab
- District: Kasur
- Tehsil: Kasur
- Number of Union Councils: 1

Area
  - Total: 1.8 sq mi (4.6 km^{2})

Population
  - Estimate (2017): 9,690
- Time zone: UTC+5 (PST)
  - Summer (DST): +5
- Calling code: 049

Mir Muhammad (Urdu: میر محمد), is a town and Union Council of Kasur District in the Punjab province of Pakistan. This is a village of Bhatti Rajputs it's Related Villages are Sattoki and Chak 109/7-R Bhattinagar these three villages are brother villages.
