= Cash management =

Measures of managing short-term cash in the company

Cash management non-financial institutions survey 2016: Which ICMs do you use most globally? Rank by overall volume, published September 2016
Ranking		Name	Score
2016	2015	Name	Score
1	1	(United Kingdom) HSBC	11041
2	2	(United States) Citi	7389
3	3	(Germany) Deutsche Bank	4238
4	4	(France) BNP Paribas	3448
5	6	(Italy) UniCredit	2192
6	7	(United Kingdom) Standard Chartered	1654
7	9	(Japan) The Bank of Tokyo-Mitsubishi UFJ	1626
8	5	(United States) Bank of America Merrill Lynch	1475
9	8	(United States) JPMorgan	1397
10	10	(France) Société Générale	1217

Cash management refers to a broad area of finance involving the collection, handling, and usage of cash. It involves assessing market liquidity, cash flow, and investments.

In banking, cash management, or treasury management, is a marketing term for certain services related to cash flow offered primarily to larger business customers. It may be used to describe all bank accounts (such as checking accounts) provided to businesses of a certain size, but it is more often used to describe specific services such as cash concentration, zero balance accounting, and clearing house facilities. Sometimes, private banking customers are given cash management services.

Financial contracts and other instruments involved in cash management include money market funds, treasury bills, and certificates of deposit.

== Common services ==
The following is a list of services generally offered by banks and utilized by larger businesses and corporations:

Account reconciliation
Bank reconciliation can be difficult for a very large business: since it issues so many checks, it can take a lot of human effort to work out which checks have not cleared and therefore what the company's true balance is. To address this, banks have developed a system which allows companies to upload a list of all the checks that they issue each day, so that at the end of the month the bank statement will show not only which checks have cleared, but also which have not. More recently, banks have used this system to prevent checks from being fraudulently cashed if they are not on the list, a process known as positive pay.

Advanced web services
Most banks have an Internet-based system which is more advanced than the one available to consumers. This enables managers to create and authorize special internal logon credentials, allowing employees to send wires and access other cash management features normally not found on the consumer web site.

Armored car services/cash collection
Large retailers who collect a great deal of cash may have the bank arrange for an armored car company to collect the cash, instead of asking its employees to deposit the cash.

Clearing house
Usually offered by the cash management division of a bank. The clearing house is an electronic system used to transfer funds between banks. Companies use this to pay others, especially employees (this is how direct deposit works). Certain companies also use it to collect funds from customers (this is generally how automatic payment plans work). This system is criticized by some consumer advocacy groups, because under this system banks assume that the company initiating the debit is correct until proven otherwise.

Balance reporting
Corporate clients who actively manage their cash balances usually subscribe to secure web-based reporting of their account and transaction information at their lead bank. These sophisticated compilations of banking activity may include balances in foreign currencies, as well as those at other banks. They include information on cash positions as well as 'float' (e.g. checks in the process of collection). Finally, they offer transaction-specific details on all forms of payment activity, including deposits, checks, wire transfers in and out, ACH (automated clearinghouse debits and credits), investments, etc.

Cash concentration services
Large or national chain retailers often have branches in places where their primary bank does not have branches. So they open bank accounts at various local banks in the area. To prevent funds in these accounts from being idle and not earning sufficient interest, many of these companies have an agreement set with their primary bank, whereby their primary bank uses the automated clearing house to electronically "pull" the money from these banks into a single interest-bearing bank account. See also: Cash concentration.

Controlled disbursement
This is another product offered by banks under Cash Management Services. The bank provides a daily report, typically early in the day, that shows the amount of disbursements that will be charged to the customer's account. This early knowledge of daily funds requirement allows the customer to invest any surplus in intraday investment opportunities, typically money market investments. This is different from delayed disbursements, where payments are issued through a remote branch of a bank and customer is able to delay the payment due to increased float time.

Lockbox—wholesale services
Often companies (such as utilities) which receive a large number of payments by checks in the mail have the bank set up a post office box for them, open their mail, and deposit any checks found. This is referred to as a "lockbox" service.

Lockbox—retail services
These are for companies with small numbers of payments, sometimes with detailed requirements for processing. This might be a company like a dentist's office or small manufacturing company.

Positive pay
The client company electronically shares its check register of all written checks with the bank. The bank therefore will only pay checks listed in that register, with exactly the same specifications as listed in the register (amount, payee, serial number, etc.). This system dramatically reduces check fraud.

Reverse positive pay
Reverse positive pay is similar to positive pay, but the process is reversed, with the company, not the bank, maintaining the list of checks issued. When checks are presented for payment and clear through the Federal Reserve System, the Federal Reserve prepares a file of the checks' account numbers, serial numbers, and dollar amounts and sends the file to the bank. In reverse positive pay, the bank sends that file to the company, where the company compares the information to its internal records. The company lets the bank know which checks match its internal information, and the bank pays those items. The bank then researches the checks that do not match, corrects any misreads or encoding errors, and determines if any items are fraudulent. The bank pays only "true" exceptions, that is, those that can be reconciled with the company's files.

Sweep accounts
Sweep accounts are typically offered by the cash management division of a bank. Under this system, excess funds from a company's bank accounts are automatically moved into a money market mutual fund overnight, and then moved back the next morning. This allows them to earn interest overnight. The primary vehicles of sweeps are money market mutual funds and bank deposit products.

Zero balance account
A zero balance account can be thought of as somewhat of a hack. Companies with large numbers of stores or locations can very often be confused if all those stores are depositing into a single bank account. Traditionally, it would be impossible to know which deposits were from which stores without seeking to view images of those deposits. To help correct this problem, banks developed a system where each store is given its own bank account, but all the money deposited into the individual store accounts are automatically moved or swept into the company's main bank account. This allows the company to look at individual statements for each store. U.S. banks are almost all converting their systems so that companies can tell which store made a particular deposit, even if these deposits are all deposited into a single account. Therefore, zero balance accounting is being used less frequently.

Wire transfer
A wire transfer is an electronic transfer of funds. Wire transfers can be done by a simple bank account transfer, or by a transfer of cash at a cash office. Bank wire transfers are often the most expedient method for transferring funds between bank accounts. A bank wire transfer is a message to the receiving bank requesting them to effect payment in accordance with the instructions given. The message also includes settlement instructions. The actual wire transfer itself is virtually instantaneous, requiring no longer for transmission than a telephone call.

Automated cash handling
Automated cash handling is the process of dispensing, counting and tracking cash in a bank, retail, check cashing, payday loan / advance, casino or other business environment through specially designed hardware and software for the purposes of loss prevention, theft deterrence and reducing management time for oversight of cash drawer (till) operations.

In the past, other services have been offered, the usefulness of which has diminished with the rise of the Internet. For example, companies could have daily faxes of their most recent transactions or be sent CD-ROMs of images of their cashed checks.

Cash management services can be costly but usually the cost to a company is outweighed by the benefits: cost savings, accuracy, efficiencies, etc.
