= Machhianwala railway station =

Railway station in Pakistan

Machhianwala Station ماچھیانوالہ ریلوے اسٹیشن
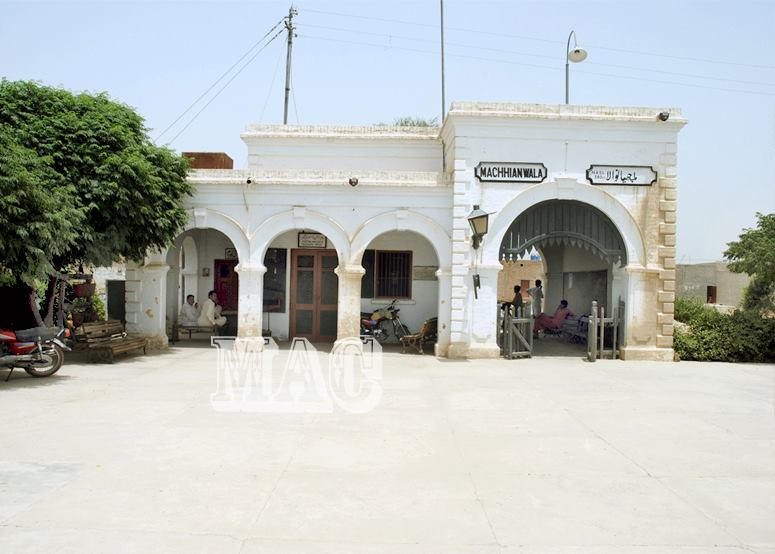

General information
- Coordinates: 30.10342°N 72.52033°E
- Owner: Ministry of Railways
- Line: Lodhran–Raiwind Branch Line

Other information
- Station code: MCW

Services
Preceding station	Pakistan Railways	Following station
Vehari towards Lodhran Junction	Lodhran–Raiwind Branch Line	Mandi Burewala towards Raiwind Junction
Location

Machhianwala Railway Station (Urdu: ماچھیانوالہ ریلوے اسٹیشن, Punjabi: ماچھیانوالہ ریلوے اسٹیشن) is located in Vehari District, Punjab, Pakistan.

== See also ==
- List of railway stations in Pakistan
- Pakistan Railway
