= Gohar Jageer =

گوہرجاگِير
- Village
- Gohar Jageer
- Location within Pakistan
- Coordinates: 31°6′44″N 74°13′1″E
- Country: Pakistan
- Province: Punjab
- District: Kasur
- Time zone: UTC+5 (PST)

Gohar Jageer (Urdu: گوہرجاگِير) is a village in union council 17-R Usman Wala, tehsil and Kasur district, Punjab province, Pakistan.

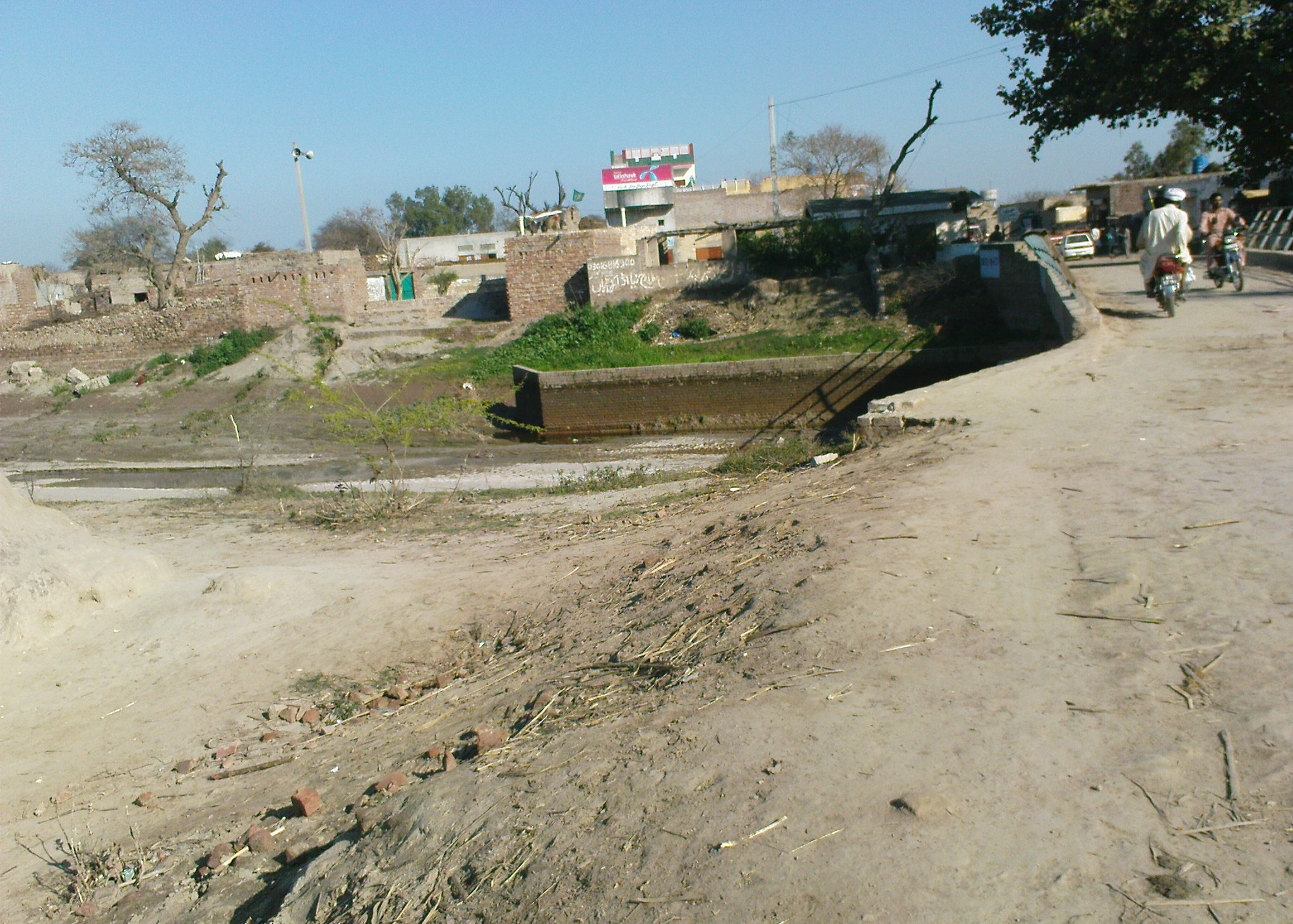
Entrance to Gohar Jageer through a bridge over the BRB canal

Gohar Jageer is 7 miles (10 km) south-west from the town of Khudian Khas and 4 miles (6 km) south from the Depalpur Road, which runs locally from Khudian to Allah Abad. Population is approximately ten thousand, being the largest village population in the union council, with the majority caste being.Rajput.That is never underestimated. There are the most famous personalities in this village and its work to Agriculture. They helped to needy person. Nearby villages include Tatara Kamil, Usman wala, Kili Sokal, Mahalam, Noor Pur and Rajowal.

Most occupations are within agriculture and farming, which includes the cultivation of wheat, rice and sugarcane. There is one boys’ primary school and one girls’ primary school. The village is on the bank of the BRB canal, on which is a Rangers checkpost.
