= Haveli Wasawewala railway station =

Railway station in Pakistan

Haveli Wasawewala Station حویلی وساوئے والا ریلوے اسٹیشن

General information
- Owner: Ministry of Railways
- Line: Lodhran–Raiwind Branch Line

Other information
- Station code: HWSW

Services
Preceding station	Pakistan Railways	Following station
Chak Kambo towards Lodhran Junction	Lodhran–Raiwind Branch Line	Haveli Lakha towards Raiwind Junction
Location

Haveli Wasawewala Railway Station (Urdu: حویلی وساوئے والا ریلوے اسٹیشن, Punjabi: حویلی وساوئے والا ریلوے اسٹیشن) is located in Pakistan.

== See also ==
- List of railway stations in Pakistan
- Pakistan Railways
