= Kishanbir Nagarkoti =

Kishanbir Nagarkoti, IOM (gold bar, 1st class, 2nd class, 3rd class) (born 1847/48 - died?) was a Nepalese soldier in the British Indian Army who was awarded the Indian Order of Merit (IOM) four times. He served in the 1st Battalion of the 5th Gurkha Rifles. He is the only person to have been awarded the IOM award four times.

== Four awards of the Indian Order of Merit ==
=== Background to the Indian Order of Merit ===
Till 1911, the IOM was the only gallantry award for which native soldiers in the British Indian Army were eligible. It existed in three classes, and was often thought of as the equivalent of the Victoria Cross. In 1911, Indians became eligible for the Victoria Cross, which replaced the First class of the IOM, while the other two classes remained in place for next many years.

=== Nagarkoti's awards ===
Nagarkoti received his first three IOMs in a single campaign, the Second Anglo-Afghan War:

- His first IOM (3rd class) was for gallantry in the battle of Mangiar Pass, Afghanistan, in December 1878. He was then a sepoy.
- His second IOM (2nd class) was for gallantry at the battle of Charasia in October 1879. He was then still a sepoy.
- His third IOM (1st class) was for gallantry at the battle of Kabul in December 1879. He was then a Naik.

His fourth and final IOM was a gold bar to his IOM, when he was a Subedar, for gallantry in fighting against the Black Mountain tribesmen in June 1888, which sparked off the Hazara Expedition of 1888.

=== The medal ===
His first IOM was a medal, the next two were bars to the riband of his medal, and the fourth was a special gold bar added to the riband. The medal is presently in the possession of the 5th Gorkha Rifles, Indian Army.

=== Assessment of Nagarkoti's achievement ===
Professor Edward Haynes of Withrop University opines that this unique distinction of Nagarkoti was in essence equivalent to winning the Victoria Cross four times. Major General Ian Cardozo of the Indian Army holds the same view.

== Post-retirement ==
In 1892, Nagarkoti retired at the age of 44, and went on pension. In addition to his regular pension as a Subedar, of Rs. 30 a month, he was paid a special pension for Rs. 20 a month for life, in recognition of his extraordinary services.
