= Kanganpur railway station =

Railway station in Pakistan

Kanganpur Railway Station کنگن پور ریلوے اسٹیشن

General information
- Coordinates: 30.7584°N 74.1219°E
- Owner: Ministry of Railways
- Line: Lodhran–Raiwind Branch Line
- Platforms: 1
- Tracks: 2

Construction
- Parking: Available

Other information
- Station code: KZN

Services
Preceding station	Pakistan Railways	Following station
Haji Chand towards Lodhran Junction	Lodhran–Raiwind Branch Line	Basti Qutab towards Raiwind Junction
Location

Kanganpur Railway Station (Urdu: کنگن پور ریلوے اسٹیشن, Punjabi: کنگن پور ریلوے اسٹیشن) is located in town of Kanganpur, Kasur District, Pakistan.

== See also ==
- List of railway stations in Pakistan
- Pakistan Railways
