= ABWA =

ABWA may refer to:

- ABWA, NGO of young people in village Bazidpur
- Al-Abwa, a village belong to Rabigh on the western coast of Saudi Arabia
- American Business Women's Association, a national professional association for women
- Association of Accountancy Bodies in West Africa, a regional organization of the International Federation of Accountants
