= Kasur Junction railway station =

Railway station in Pakistan

Kasur Junction Station قصور جنکشن ریلوے اسٹیشن

General information
- Coordinates: 31.1183°N 74.4424°E
- Owner: Ministry of Railways
- Line: Lodhran–Raiwind Branch Line

Other information
- Station code: KUS

Services
Preceding station	Pakistan Railways	Following station
Roshan Billa towards Lodhran Junction	Lodhran–Raiwind Branch Line	Athilpur towards Raiwind Junction
Location

Kasur Junction Railway Station (Urdu and Punjabi: قصور جنکشن ریلوے اسٹیشن) is located in Pakistan. Kasur Junction was a junction before the partition of India and Pakistan. But after partition it became only a railway station. Presently, there is only one train arrival and departure.

== History ==
From here, a branch line used to go to Amritsar junction via Hussainiwala and Firozpur in India where it connected to the Jalandhar–Firozpur line. Since India–Pakistan war of 1971, the cross-border Kasur-Hussainiwala-Firozpur link is now dead, though India still holds the daily India-Pakistan border ceremony in the form of beating retreat ceremony. However, India is constructing the Firopur-Patti line, to compensate for the lost link, to geostrategically enhance the Indian Railway network along the India-Pakistan border.

== See also ==
- List of railway stations in Pakistan
- Pakistan Railways
