= Rajowal =

- Village
- Country: India
- State: Punjab
- District: Jalandhar

Languages
  - Official: Punjabi
- Time zone: UTC+5:30 (IST)
- PIN: 144039
- Telephone code: 1826

Rajowal is a village in Nurmahal. Nurmahal is a sub tehsil in the city Jalandhar of Indian state of Punjab.

== About ==
Rajowal is almost 9 km from Nurmahal. The nearest railway station to Rajowal is Nurmahal Railway station. Another village Rajowal Nau of Muslim Kambohs is located in Punjab of Pakistan.

== Post code & STD code ==
Rajowal's Post office is Kot Badal Khan whose code is 144039. The village's STD code is 01826.

== See also ==
- Rajowal Nau
