= Daftuh =

- Town
- Location within Pakistan
- Coordinates: 30°56′56″N 73°44′36″E
- Country: Pakistan
- Province: Punjab
- District: Kasur
- Time zone: UTC+5 (PST)

Daftuh is a town and Union Council of the Kasur District in Punjab, Pakistan. It is part of Kasur Tehsil and is located at 31°15'0N 74°22'60E with an altitude of 197 metres (649 feet).

Neighbourhood Villages

- East side Mustafabad (lalyani)
- Wet side satoky
- South side Panodoky and Gulvera
- North side orara village

Entering from east (Mustafabad) first chowk known as qaichi (scissor), before qainchi chowk right road goes to shehere khamoshan (graveyard)

== Places of interest ==
There is a Gurdwara in Daftuh that was built in the 18th century. Bulleh Shah took refuge in the Gurdwara after a group of Islamic fundamentalists had got after his life.

== Notable people ==
- Bulleh Shah, an 18th-century Punjabi philosopher who took refuge in the town.
- Bibi Isher Kaur, the female leader (chieftain) of Sikh community of the town.
