= Dholan Hithar =

Village in Punjab, Pakistan

Coordinates: 30°57′N 74°17′E

Dholan Hithar is a town in Kasur Tehsil in the Punjab province of Pakistan. It is a Union Council Number 37 of Kasur District. The population of Dholan Hithar is 40,000.
