= Pial Kalan =

Ittehad Colony, Pial Kalan
- Town
- Location within Pakistan
- Coordinates: 30°56′56″N 73°44′36″E
- Country: Pakistan
- Province: Punjab
- District: Kasur
- Time zone: UTC+5 (PST)

Pial Kalan is a town and Union Council of Kasur District, in the Punjab province of Pakistan. There are 4 main residential areas of Pial Kalan: Ittehad Colony, Mohallah Arrian, Mohallah Kambohan wala, and Mian Mohallah. Ittehad Colony is the main and biggest area of Pial Kalan. Pial Kalan is part of Kasur Tehsil and is located at 30°55'0N 74°13'60E with an altitude of 181 metres (597 feet).

Pial Kalan is a village situated in the central Punjab. It has an approximate population of 15000 and most of the inhabitants are farmers. It has very fertile land and it gets water from nearby canal and tube wells. Major crops are rice, wheat, and sugarcane. The surrounding villages and towns include Usmanwala, Pial Khurd, Dhing Shah, Chah Rakhwala and Nainwal. There are two government primary schools for boys and one high school for girls. Nearby high schools for boys and girls are situated at Usmanwala, a neighbouring town in the south. The village is linked to DepalPur Road by two adjacent roads, one ending up at Dhing Shah and the other near Khudian Khas. The transport facilities are not very good although some vans pick up passengers for Kasur and even Lahore early in the morning and drop back after the evening. However, during the day, people use rikshaws and horse carts to reach at main DepalPur Road near Dhing Shah, where they can get lorries and buses for Kasur, Lahore, Chunian and Pattoki.

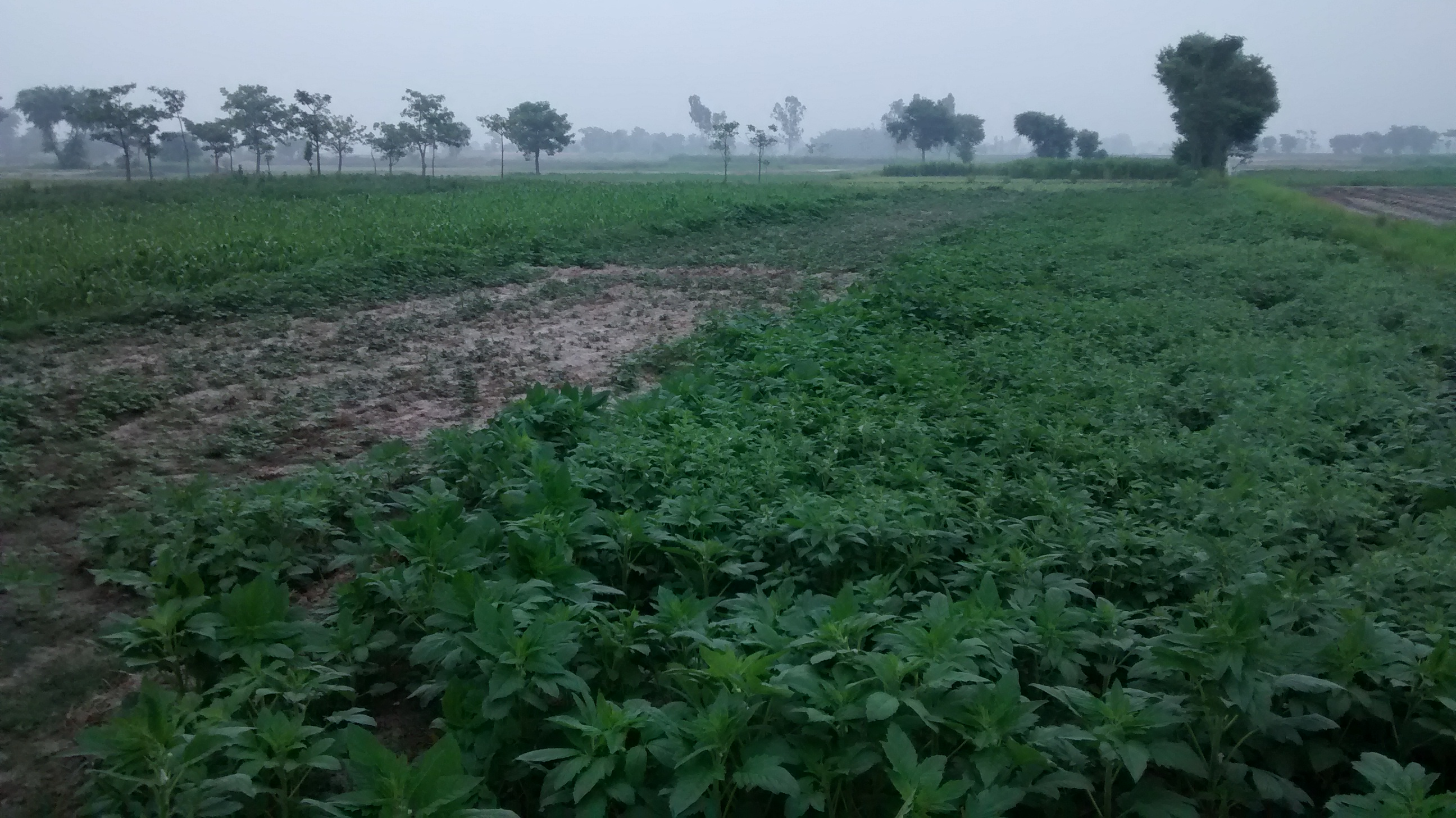
A beautiful morning view near Pial Kalan

Almost whole of the population speak Punjabi. However some educated persons can speak Urdu and English as well. More than 99% population of the village are Muslims and all follow Sunni Islam. Christians constitute rest of the population. Muslims and Christians live together peacefully and no dispute has been witnessed in the past.

The main castes in the village are Arain, Mein and Kamboh. Fourth holds most of arable land and control most of the business activities. Other castes include khokhar, taili, nai, and kumhars.
