= Orara =

Orara "Rara"
- Village
- Location within Pakistan
- Coordinates: 30°56′56″N 73°44′36″E
- Country: Pakistan
- Province: Punjab
- District: Kasur
- Time zone: UTC+5 (PST)

Orara is a historical town and Union Council of Kasur District in the Punjab province of Pakistan. Before Partition, Orara was administratively under the Lahore District and Kasur Tehsil. The village was largely populated by Mirza, DoGar, pathan, Gujjar and Jatt clans, predominantly Sikhs who later settled in East Punjab. It is part of Kasur Tehsil and is located at 31°12'1N 74°21'44E with an altitude of 194 metres (639 feet).
