= Bhedian Kalan =

- Town
- Location within Pakistan
- Coordinates: 30°56′56″N 73°44′36″E
- Country: Pakistan
- Province: Punjab
- District: Kasur
- Time zone: UTC+5 (PST)

Bhedian Kalan (Urdu: بيدياں كلاں) is a town and Union Council of the Kasur District in the Punjab province of Pakistan. It is part of Kasur Tehsil and is located at an altitude of 187 metres (616 feet).
