= Arif Wala railway station =

Railway station in Arifwala, Pakistan

Arif Wala Railway Station عارف والا ریلوے اسٹیشن

General information
- Coordinates: 30.2934°N 73.0653°E
- Owner: Ministry of Railways
- Line: Lodhran–Raiwind Branch Line

Other information
- Station code: ARF

History
- Opened: 1924

Services
Preceding station	Pakistan Railways	Following station
Gaggoo towards Lodhran Junction	Lodhran–Raiwind Branch Line	Murad Chishti towards Raiwind Junction
Location

Arif Wala Railway Station (Urdu: عارف والا ریلوے اسٹیشن, Punjabi: عارف والا ریلوے اسٹیشن) is located in Arifwala, Pakistan. The station was built in 1924.

== See also ==
- List of railway stations in Pakistan
- Pakistan Railways
