= Nathoki =

- Town
- Location within Pakistan
- Coordinates: 30°56′56″N 73°44′36″E
- Country: Pakistan
- Province: Punjab
- District: Kasur
- Time zone: UTC+5 (PST)

Nathoki is a town and Union Council of Kasur District in the Punjab province of Pakistan. It is part of Kasur Tehsil and is located at 31°6'44N 74°7'35E with an altitude of 189 metres (623 feet). It comprises four villages. Syed Javaid Hayat Shah is the union council chairman.
