= Battle of Gazipur =

Part of the Bangladesh liberation war

- Part of the Indo-pakistani war of 1971
Date	4–5 December 1971 (1 day)
Location	Kulaura, Sylhet, Bangladesh
Result	Indian-Bangladeshi victory
Territorial changes	Kulaura was liberated in December.

Belligerents
India: Indian Army; Bangladesh: Mukti Bahini	Pakistan

Commanders and leaders
(India) Shyam Kelkar †	(Pakistan) Brig. Iftikhar Rana

Units involved
5 Gorkha Rifles	22 Baloch Regiment

Strength
Unknown	Unknown

The Battle of Gazipur (Bengali: গাজীপুরের যুদ্ধ) was a military engagement on 4 and 5 December 1971, during the Bangladesh liberation war. It took place at the Gazipur Tea Estate near Kulaura, in the Sylhet District of what was then East Pakistan. The advancing 4/5 Gorkha Rifles attacked the 22 Baluch Regiment of the Pakistan Army. This battle was a prelude to the Battle of Sylhet.

== See also ==
- Evolution of Pakistan Eastern Command plan
- Indo-Pakistani wars and conflicts
