= Cash concentration =

Example:
You have 2 bank accounts (i.e. Bank X and Bank Y). For each of these bank accounts, you set a minimum of XXX 10,000. In the actual account, it appears X has XXX 15,000 while Bank Y has XXX 20,000. The difference XXX 5,000 (from Bank X) and XXX 10,000 (from Bank Y) will be transferred for a total of XXX 15.000 to Bank Account Z (Cash pool). This increases the possibility of using the surplus for other uses.

Cash concentration is the transfer of funds from diverse accounts into a central account to improve the efficiency of cash management. The consolidation of cash into a single account allows a company to maintain smaller cash balances overall, and to identify excess cash available for short term investments.

The cash available in different bank accounts are pooled into a master account. The advantages of cash concentration are

1. Cash control
2. Cash visibility

== Methods ==
Cash concentration is commonly implemented through either physical concentration or notional pooling. JPMorgan explains that physical cash concentration involves the actual movement of funds between accounts, typically into a central concentration account, while notional pooling offsets balances for interest or reporting purposes without transferring the funds themselves.

This distinction is important in corporate treasury management, since physical concentration centralizes liquidity through real transfers, whereas notional pooling preserves separate account balances while still improving cash visibility and liquidity management.
