= Kotli Rai Abubakar =

Kotli Rai Abu Bakar Kotli or Kotly
- Village
- Location within Pakistan
- Coordinates: 30°56′56″N 73°44′36″E
- Country: Pakistan
- Province: Punjab
- District: Kasur
- Time zone: UTC+5 (PST)
- Calling code: 042

Kotli Rai Abu Bakar is a village and Union Council (No. 25) of Kasur District in the Punjab province of Pakistan. It is a major village of Kasur Tehsil, and is located at 31°6'1N 74°16'42E with an altitude of 188 metres (620 feet).
