= Bhamba =

Bhamba بھمبا
- Town
- Location within Pakistan
- Coordinates: 30°56′56″N 73°44′36″E
- Country: Pakistan
- Province: Punjab
- District: Kasur

Population
  - Total: 42,167
- Time zone: UTC+5 (PST)
- Calling code: +92

Bhamba (Urdu, Punjabi: بھمبا) is a town and Municipality in Kasur District in the Punjab province of Pakistan. It is part of Kasur Tehsil and is located at 31°11'21N 74°12'8E with an altitude of 203 metres (669 feet).
