= Dhing Shah =

- Village
- Location within Pakistan
- Coordinates: 30.934299°N 74.212541°E
- Country: Pakistan
- Province: Punjab
- District: Kasur
- Time zone: UTC+5 (PST)

Dhing Shah is a village in Kasur District of the Pakistani province of Punjab. It is 5 miles (8 km) south-west from the town of Khudian Khas and 0.8 miles (1 km) south from the Depalpur Road, which runs from Kasur to Depalpur.

The village is served by a gas pipe line provided by the Punjab government, and also supplies of water and cable TV. Dhing Shah has a Government Boys High School and Girls Middle School. Its area is 2,271 Acres. According to 2017 census, population of this village is 11,566 and its literacy rate is 49.6%.

There is basic health unit in this village. Its nearest Rural health center is located in Khudian Khas, while nearest basic health unit is located in Pial Kalan.
