= Mudke Dhariwal =

- Town
- Location within Pakistan
- Coordinates: 30°56′56″N 73°44′36″E
- Country: Pakistan
- Province: Punjab
- District: Kasur
- Time zone: UTC+5 (PST)

Mudke Dhariwal (Urdu: مُدكے دهارِيوال), is a town and Union Council of Kasur District in the Punjab province of Pakistan. It is part of Kasur Tehsil and is located at 31°15'4N 74°3'52E with an altitude of 196 metres (646 feet). The village belongs to the HASHMI tribe of the Dhariwal.
