= Chah Nur Muhammad railway station =

Railway station in Pakistan

Chah Nur Muhammad Station چاہ نور محمد اسٹیشن

General information
- Owner: Ministry of Railways
- Line: Lodhran-Raiwind Branch Line

Other information
- Station code: CNQ

Chah Nur Muhammad railway station (Urdu: چاہ نور محمد ریلوے اسٹیشن) is located in Pakistan.

== See also ==
- List of railway stations in Pakistan
- Pakistan Railways
