= Usman Wala =

Town in Punjab, Pakistan

عُثمان والا
- village
- Bhedian Usman Wala
- Location within Pakistan
- Coordinates: 31°6′44″N 74°13′1″E
- Country: Pakistan
- Province: Punjab
- District: Kasur

Government
- Elevation: 197 m (646 ft)
- Time zone: UTC+5 (PST)

Usman Wala (Urdu: عُثمان والا), is a town in Kasur District in the Punjab province of Pakistan.

It is administratively part of Kasur Tehsil, and is at an altitude of 197 metres (649 feet).

Rail transport is centred on Usmanwala railway station.
