= Zero balance account =

Type of bank account used in corporate cash management

In finance, a zero balance account (ZBA) is a system of cash pooling that consolidates the cash balances of several subsidiaries of a single company. This cash management system is designed to leave in the current accounts of the subsidiaries the minimum amounts to be able to deal with their debts contracted.

The main advantage of this system is to centralize the cash to be able to put it to better interest rates.

This system may have the disadvantage of not allowing enough independence to financial subsidiaries.
