= Muhammad Nagar railway station =

Railway station in Pakistan

Coordinates: 30°16′N 72°59′E

General information
- Owner: Ministry of Railways

Other information
- Station code: MHNR

History
- Former names: Great Indian Peninsula Railway
Location

Muhammad Nagar railway station (Urdu: محمد نگر ریلوے اسٹیشن) is located in Pakistan.

== See also ==
- List of railway stations in Pakistan
- Pakistan Railways
