= Bazidpur =

- Town
- Location within Pakistan
- Coordinates: 30°56′56″N 73°44′36″E
- Country: Pakistan
- Province: Punjab
- District: Kasur
- Time zone: UTC+5 (PST)

Bazidpur is a town and Union Council of the Kasur District in the Punjab province of Pakistan. It is part of Kasur Tehsil and is located at 31°1'0N 74°28'11E with an altitude of 184 metres (606 feet).

It is near the Ganda Singh border. The non-governmental organization ABWA is working in this village to increase the value of village.
