= Battle of Sylhet =

Part of the Bangladesh Liberation War

Siege of Sylhet
- Part of Bangladesh Liberation War and Indo-Pakistani War of 1971
Date	7–16 December 1971
Location	Sylhet, Bangladesh
Result	Bangladeshi-Indian victory: Surrender of Pakistani forces at Sylhet; Sylhet captured by Indian forces

Belligerents
India; Bangladesh	Pakistan

The Battle of Sylhet (Note: Bengali: সিলেটের যুদ্ধ) (Note: Hindi: सिलहट का युद्ध) was a major battle fought between the advancing Indian Army, Bangladesh Forces and the defending Pakistan Army at Sylhet during the Bangladesh Liberation War. The battle took place from 7 December to 15 December. It was a succession of the Battle of Gazipur in Kulaura.

== Background ==
On 21 November 1971, the 4th battalion of the 5th Gorkha Rifles crossed the Surma River. After heavy fighting, they captured Atgram along with a large amount of arms and ammunition.

== Deployments ==
=== India ===
The 8th Mountain Division was responsible for the operations in Sylhet. This included:

- 59th Mountain Brigade - Dharmanagar
  - 5th Gorkha Rifles
- 81st Mountain Brigade - Kailashahar

== Objectives ==
=== Pakistan ===
Pakistan adopted a fortress strategy. In accordance with this strategy, ten cities, Jessore, Jhenaidah, Bogra, Rangpur, Jamalpur, Mymensingh, Sylhet, Bhairab Bazar, Comilla, and Chittagong, were converted into fortresses.

== Battle ==
Following the Indian intervention of East Pakistan, 202nd infantry Brigade of Pakistan army was the sole defence of Sylhet. Unknown to the Indian and Bangladeshi forces, Iftikhar Rana transported his brigade and retreat to Sylhet in order to support Salimulah Chohan the commander of 202nd brigade at Jalalabad Cantonment. On Indian formation, both of Gorkha Battalions divided their operations through four companies. On 7 December after aerial surveillance, 14 Mil Mi-4 helicopters took off with 4th and 5th Gorkha Rifles landing at pre-selected spots. Around 384

On 16 December Pakistani army troops consisting of 107 officers, 219 Junior commissioned officers, and 6,190 soldiers surrendered to the Bangladeshi-Indian troops as a part of Pakistani Instrument of Surrender.

== See also ==
- Battle of Basantar
- Battle of Longewala
- Battle of Hilli
