= Zorawar Chand Bakhshi =

Indian Army general

Lieutenant General Zorawar Chand Bakshi PVSM, MVC, VrC, VSM
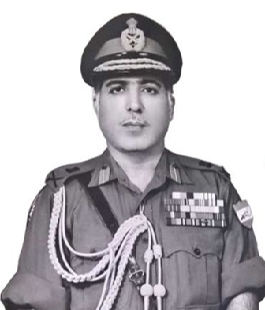
- Born: Zorawar Chand Bakshi; 21 October 1921 (or 2 January 1921); Gulyana, Punjab, British India
- Died: 24 May 2018 (aged 96-97)
- Military career
- Allegiance: British India; India
- Branch: British Indian Army; Indian Army
- Service years: 1943–1979
- Rank: Lieutenant General
- Nickname: Zoru
- Service number: IC-1510
- Units: 5 Gorkha Rifles (Frontier Force); 10th Baluch Regiment
- Commands: II Corps; 26 Infantry Division; 8 Mountain Division; 68 Infantry Brigade; 2/5 Gorkha Rifles (Frontier Force)
- Conflicts: World War II; Indo-Pakistan War of 1965; Indo-Pakistan War of 1971
- Awards: Param Vishisht Seva Medal; Maha Vir Chakra; Vir Chakra; Vishisht Seva Medal; MacGregor Medal

Lieutenant General Zorawar Chand 'Zoru' Bakshi PVSM, MVC, VrC, VSM (21 October 1921 or 2 January 1921 (Note: As given in the pre-Independence Indian Army List.) – 24 May 2018) was a General Officer of the Indian Army, most widely known as one of the commanders of Indo-Pakistani War of 1965 (Operation Ablaze). He also has the distinction of being "India's most decorated General".

== Family and early life ==
Bakshi was born to Bahadur Bakshi Lal Chand, a decorated soldier in the British Indian Army who held the OBI. He was born in Gulyana in the Rawalpindi District of the Punjab Province of British India. As with many other non-muslims of that region, his family had to shift to the newly-created Dominion of India after the Partition of India, being of Hindu faith. Prior to the partition, he graduated from Rawalpindi's Gordon College in 1942 after which he joined the Indian Military Academy in Dehra Doon.

== Military career ==
=== World War II ===
Bakshi was commissioned into the Baloch Regiment of the British Indian Army in 1943. Later he also did a course at Royal College of Defence Studies (RCDS), UK. His first major battle was against the Japanese in Burma in World War II, where he earned a Mention in Despatches for overcoming a heavily fortified Japanese position. After the liberation of Burma, he participated in the operations to liberate Malaysia from Japanese control, earning a fast-track promotion to the rank of a Major for his role.

=== Post-Independence ===
Upon the Partition of India in 1947, Bakshi was transferred to the 5th Gorkha Rifles regiment of the Indian Army. In the Indo Pakistani War of 1947-1948, he was awarded a Vir Chakra for his bravery in July 1948. Soon afterward he was awarded the MacGregor Medal in 1949. In 1951, he was selected to attend the Defence Services Staff College in Wellington.

In the victorious Indo-Pakistani War of 1965, Bakshi was instrumental in the capture of the Haji Pir Pass from the Pakistani Forces, for which he was awarded the Maha Vir Chakra. The citation for the Maha Vir Chakra reads as follows:

Gazette Notification: 9 Pres/66,1-1-66

Operation: 1965 May - Ablaze Date of Award: 05 Aug 1965

CITATION

Brigadier Zorawar Chand Bakshi (IC-1510), Vr.C.,

5th Bn., The Gorkha Rifles

Brigadier Zorawar Chand Bakshi was Commander of a Brigade which operated from the Tannmarg and Patan area in Jammu and Kashmir and later in the area of the Uri-Poonch bulge, from 5th August 1965 till the ceasefire on 23rd September 1965.

Brigadier Bakshi was given the difficult task of capturing Basali, Haji Pir Pass and Kahuta. Haji Pir is at a height of nearly 9000 feet and its capture was vital for the Uri-Poonch link-up. The road connecting Uri and Poonch via Haji Pir, had deteriorated due to disuse and at some places it had disintegrated. There was no direct route for an approach to Haji Pir except over the mountain ranges of Sank and Ledwali Gali on the west and Badori, Kuthnardi Gali and Kiran feature on the east. From Siliikot where his Brigade Headquarters was based, Haji Pir was at a distance of fourteen miles with strongly defended enemy positions forward of it and flanking it.

All along the route, Brigadier Bakshi remained foremost. As soon as an objective was captured, he was there personally, to guide and help in the reorganisation. Many a time, though enemy shelling was intense and continuous, he remained in the forefront without caring for his personal convenience or safety. After the capture of Haji Pir, he moved forward his tactical Headquarter immediately, though he knew that the enemy would most certainly counter-attack it viciously.

Throughout this operation, Brigadier Zorawar Chand Bakshi displayed a high standard of planning and tactical skill, combined with outstanding leadership, determination and camaraderie in sharing the hardships of his troops, which are in the highest traditions of the Indian Army.

In the early 1960s he led his battalion in a United Nations Operation to undo the secession of the province of Katanga from Congo, in the process earning a Vishisht Seva Medal. In 1969–1970, he led successful counter-insurgency operations in pockets of North East India, and was promoted to major-general on 23 November 1970. During the Indo-Pakistani War of 1971 he was instrumental in the capture of territory in what is now referred to as the crucial Chicken-Neck Sector, for which he was awarded the Param Vishisht Seva Medal. On 7 September 1974, he was appointed Military Secretary with the rank of lieutenant-general. On 15 December 1976, he was granted an extension of service past his statutory retirement age to 1 January 1979.

He was popularly known as "Zoru" in the Indian Army.

== Military awards and decorations ==

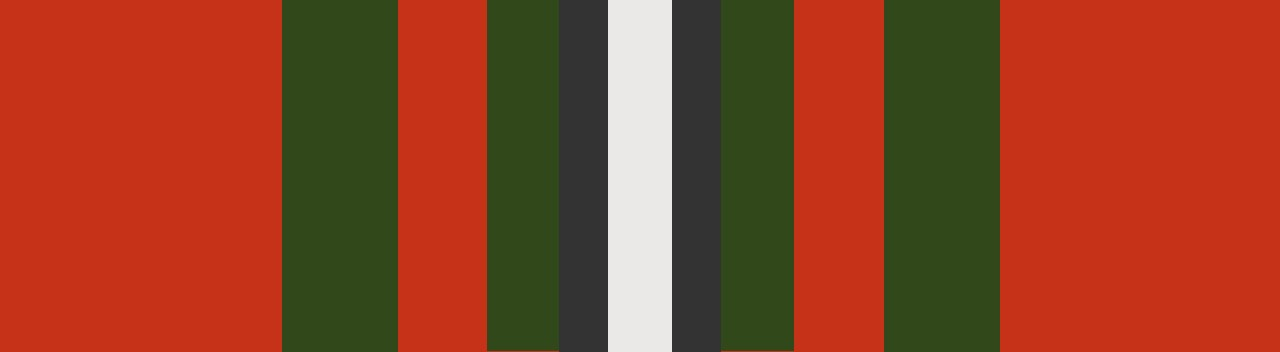

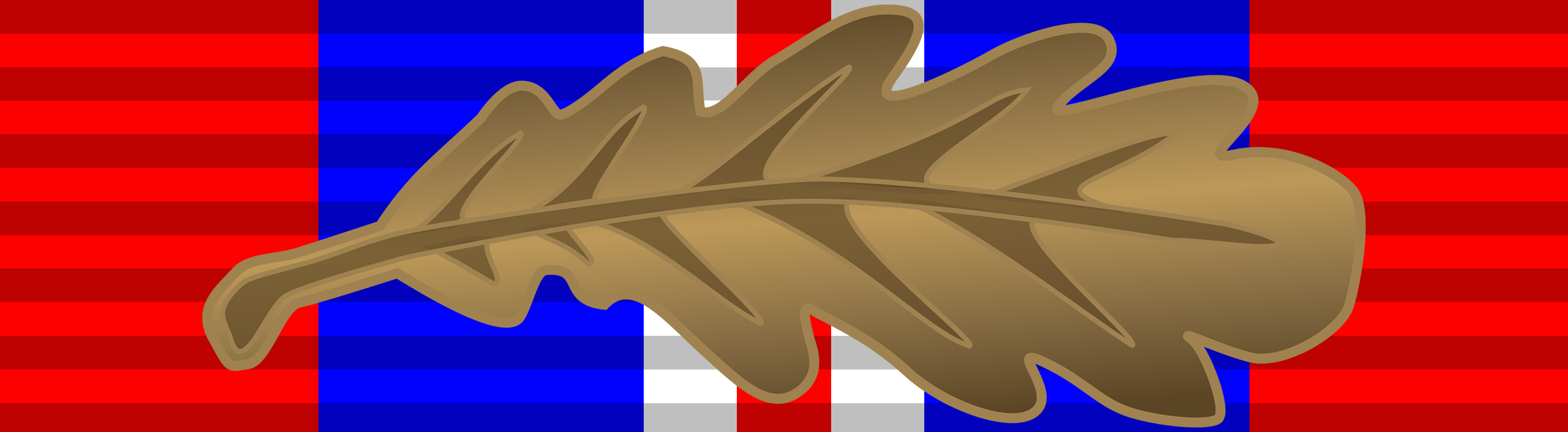

Param Vishisht Seva Medal	Maha Vir Chakra	Vir Chakra	Vishisht Seva Medal
General Service Medal Medal	Samar Seva Star	Paschimi Star	Raksha Medal
Sangram Medal	Sainya Seva Medal	Videsh Seva Medal	Indian Independence Medal
25th Anniversary of Independence Medal	20 Years Long Service Medal	9 Years Long Service Medal	MacGregor Medal
1939–1945 Star	Burma Star	War Medal 1939-1945	UN Operation in the Congo

== Dates of rank ==
Insignia	Rank	Component	Date of rank
	Second Lieutenant	British Indian Army	27 June 1943 (emergency); 27 December 1944 (substantive)
	Lieutenant	British Indian Army	27 December 1943 (war-substantive); 3 March 1947 (substantive)
	Lieutenant	Indian Army	15 August 1947 (Note: Upon independence in 1947, India became a Dominion within the British Commonwealth of Nations. As a result, the rank insignia of the British Army, incorporating the Tudor Crown and four-pointed Bath Star ("pip"), was retained, as George VI remained Commander-in-Chief of the Indian Armed Forces. After 26 January 1950, when India became a republic, the President of India became Commander-in-Chief, and the Ashoka Lion replaced the crown, with a five-pointed star being substituted for the "pip.")
	Major	Indian Army	1947 (temporary)
	Captain	Indian Army	27 June 1949
	Captain	Indian Army	26 January 1950 (recommissioning and change in insignia)
	Major	Indian Army	27 June 1956
	Lieutenant-Colonel	Indian Army	
	Colonel	Indian Army	16 February 1967
	Brigadier	Indian Army	15 May 1968
	Major General	Indian Army	23 November 1970
	Lieutenant-General	Indian Army	7 September 1974

== See also ==
- Operation Gibraltar
