= Murad Chishti railway station =

Railway station in Pakistan

Murad Chishti Station مراد چشتی ریلوے اسٹیشن

General information
- Coordinates: 30.3110°N 73.2044°E
- Owner: Ministry of Railways
- Line: Lodhran–Raiwind Branch Line

Other information
- Station code: MRCH

Services
Preceding station	Pakistan Railways	Following station
Arif Wala towards Lodhran Junction	Lodhran–Raiwind Branch Line	Pakka Sidhar towards Raiwind Junction
Location

Murad Chishti Railway Station (Urdu: مراد چشتی ریلوے اسٹیشن, Punjabi: مراد چشتی ریلوے اسٹیشن) is located in Pakistan.

== See also ==
- List of railway stations in Pakistan
- Pakistan Railways
