= Sehjra =

Sehjra سیہجرہ
- Town
- Location within Punjab, Pakistan Location within Pakistan
- Coordinates: 31°7′0″N 74°37′15″E
- Country: Pakistan
- Province: Punjab
- District: Kasur
- Time zone: UTC+5 (PST)

Sehjra (Urdu: سیہجرہ) is a town and Union Council of Kasur District in the Punjab province of Pakistan. It is part of Kasur Tehsil and is located at 31°7'0N 74°37'15E with an altitude of 192 m (630 ft).
