= Check register =

Document used to record cash transactions

In accounting, a check register or checkbook register is a document, usually part of the general ledger, used to record financial transactions in cash.
