= No. 110 Helicopter Unit, IAF =

No. 110 Helicopter Unit
- Active: 10 August 1963 – present
- Country: Republic of India
- Branch: Indian Air Force
- Garrison/HQ: Kumbhirgram AFS
- Nickname: "Vanguards"
- Mottos: Apatsu Mitram; A friend in time of need

Aircraft flown
- Attack: Mil Mi-17

No. 110 Helicopter Unit (Vanguards) is a Helicopter Unit and is equipped with Mil Mi-17 and based at Kumbhirgram Air Force Station.

== History ==
The Unit received Presidential Standard on 9 March 2011.

=== Assignments ===
- Sino-Indian War (NEFA Sector)

=== Aircraft ===
- Mil Mi-4
- Mi-8/8T
