= Mujaldiwala Halt railway station =

Railway station in Pakistan

Coordinates: 29.57326°N 71.689294°E

General information
- Owner: Ministry of Railways

Other information
- Station code: MJW

History
- Former names: Great Indian Peninsula Railway
Location

Mujaldiwala Halt railway station (Urdu: مجاہد والا ہالٹ ریلوے اسٹیشن) is located in Pakistan.

== See also ==
- List of railway stations in Pakistan
- Pakistan Railways
