= Khai Hithar =

- Town
- Location within Pakistan
- Coordinates: 30°56′56″N 73°44′36″E
- Country: Pakistan
- Province: Punjab
- District: Kasur
- Time zone: UTC+5 (PST)

Khai Hithar is a town and Union Council of Kasur District in the Punjab province of Pakistan. It is part of Kasur Tehsil, and is located at 30°58'0N 74°13'0E with an altitude of 178 metres (587 feet).
