= Farm Noor Muhammad railway station =

Railway station in Pakistan

General information
- Owner: Ministry of Railways

Other information
- Station code: FNM

History
- Former names: Great Indian Peninsula Railway

Farm Noor Muhammad railway station (Urdu: فارم نور محمد ریلوے اسٹیشن) is a railway station located in Pakistan.

== See also ==
- List of railway stations in Pakistan
- Pakistan Railways
