= Dhanote =

دهنوٹ Dhankot(old name)
- Town (urban Area)
- Dhanote
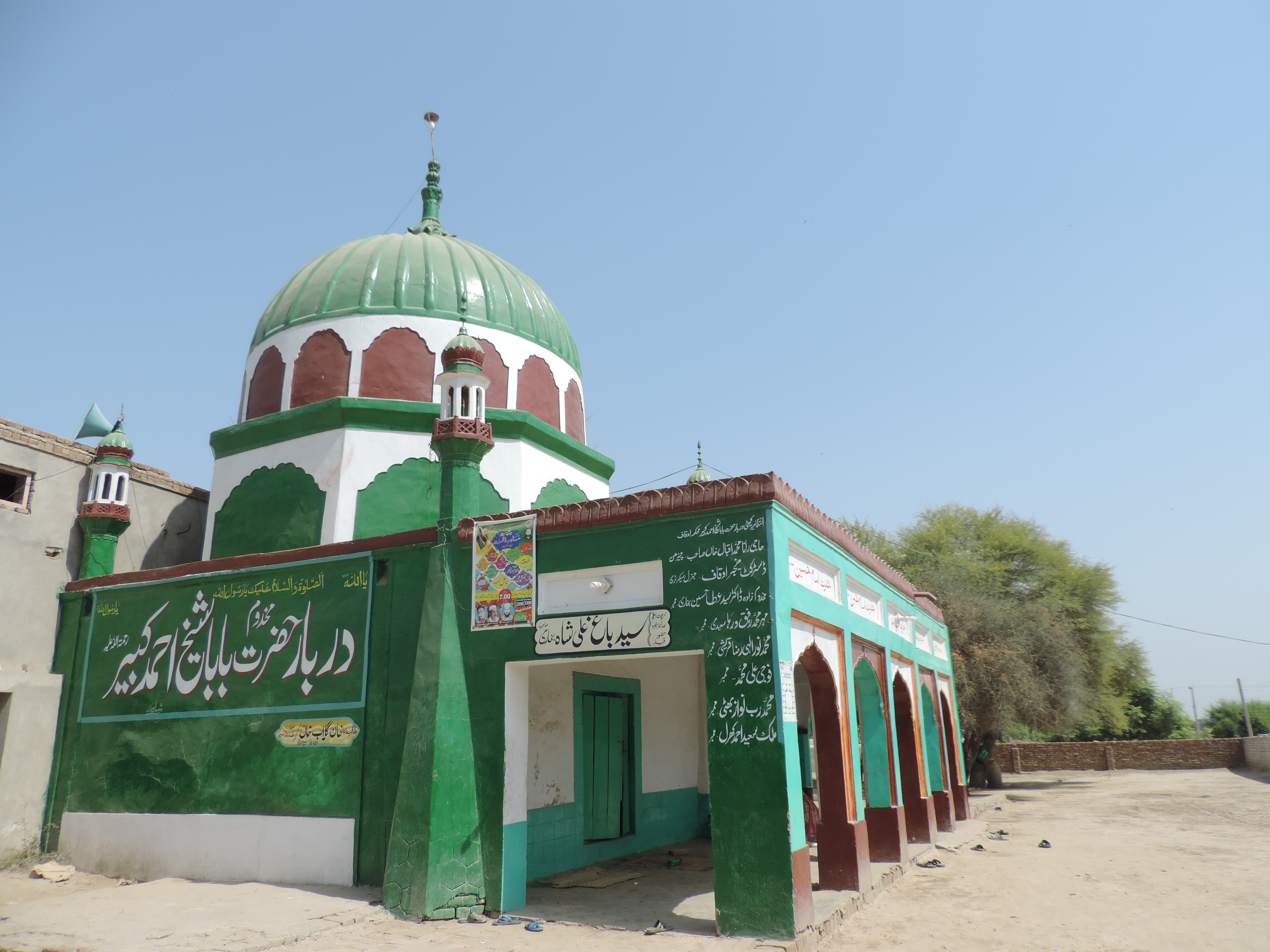
- Shrine of Sheikh Ahmed Kabir

- Location in Pakistan
- Coordinates: 29°32′N 71°38′E
- Country: Pakistan
- Region: Punjab
- District: Lodhran District

Government
  - MNA: Abdul Rehman Khan Kanju
  - MPA: Pirzada Jahangir Sultan Bhutta

Population
  - Total: 15,672
- Time zone: UTC+5 (PST)
  - Summer (DST): UTC+6 (PDT)
- Postal code: +61300

Dhanote (Urdu: دهنوٹ), also known as Dhanot, is a town of the Lodhran District on the east side of the Punjab province of Pakistan. It is located 10 kilometers (6.2 miles) away on the side of Bahawalpur-Multan-Khanewal main road. This town has fertile land with beautiful villages around it. Many native castes live here, but the majority are LODHRA, Qureshi Jabla, Saraiki, Awaan, Mughal,Rid,Mahar Sahu, Naich,Mayo, Rajput and Lohari. It has a boys secondary school, a girls higher secondary school, a police station, a railway station, basic health unit and a veterinary hospital. The town is famous for production of red chilli, cucumber, and many vegetables
