= Khudian =

Khudian Khas Khudian
- Mini City
- Location within Pakistan
- Coordinates: 30°56′56″N 73°44′36″E
- Country: Pakistan
- Province: Punjab
- District: Kasur

Area
  - Total: 136 km^{2} (53 sq mi)

Population
  - Total: 105,000+
- Time zone: UTC+5 (PST)

Khudian Khas (Urdu: کھڈیاں خاص), is a large town and Municipal Committee of Kasur District in the Punjab province of Pakistan. Khudian is part of Kasur Tehsil and is at an altitude of 177 meters (583 feet) above sea level. The Sutlej River, which flows on the India-Pakistan border, is 20 kilometers from Khudian. It is 33 kilometers from India-Pakistan border of Ganda Singh Wala.

== Boundary ==
A mud castle was still in existence in 1947 on the banks of Katora Branch Canal (also called Jora Canal) but got demolished with the passage of time.

== Railways ==
Railway has been another major means of transportation for the town. Khudian Khas is located at Lahore-Pakpatan-Samma Satta (Bahawalpur) Railway Line.

Khudian Railway Station was big and well-designed – somewhat similar to the design to existing railway station of Pakpattan. However, in 1971 India-Pakistan War, this station was destroyed and rebuilt in 1972.

== Population ==
Out of this Tehsil Kasur had an urban population of 488,741 individuals with 77,252 households. Rural population of Kasur Tehsil included 845,912 people with 125,692 households.

As per 2017 census, Khudian Khas Municipal Committee had a total population of 38,802 with 6,111 households.

== Education ==
The Govt. Post Graduate College for Women is located in Khudian Khas.

== Commerce and trade ==
There was a major dispute between the Market Committee Khudian and Town Committee Khudian over its control, mainly on the clash in the provisions of Punjab Agricultural Produce Market Ordinance, XXIII of 1978 and the Punjab Local Government Ordinance VI of 1979. The matter went to the High Court, Lahore and later into the Supreme Court. Later Supreme Court of Pakistan made a decision on this case in 1992. The decision was made by then Chief Justice of Pakistan Justice Muhammad Afzal Zullah.

== Political leadership ==
In December 2016, according to allegations, through heavy bribery, Haji Muhammad Ibrahim Jalal became the chairman and Sardar Jawad Ibrahim Dogar became the deputy chairman of the town committee As in February 2021, a government appointed administrator is in-charge of Town Committee as local government elections have not been held for many years.

As per government records of 2019, Town Committee Khudian has 84 employees.

== Police station ==
Khudian Police Station was established in 1906 which covers about 80 villages.

== Medical facilities ==
Khudian has government-run Rural Health Center, located in Bhaghbanpura area. It has an area of 4 acres of land and was established in August 1985. Prior to that, a Government Dispensary was working near to old Town Committee office. This health facility is open 24/7 and includes basic facilities such as outdoor patient department, X-ray, dental unit, laboratory, operation theatre, along with an ambulance. The town also an EPI vaccination centre for the children.

Khudian also has a Civil Veterinary Hospital in Himmat Pura area which offers a range of services includes treatment and vaccination.

Khudian also has over 10 private hospitals which include, among others: Javed Hospital, Khursheed Mukhtar Memorial Hospital, Aslam Hospital, Ali Hospital, Liaqat Medical Centre, Yaseen Medical Centre, Tayyab Shaheed Hospital, Buraq Baloch Hospital, Khawaja Ahad Hospital, Usman Medical and Dental Clinic.

Al Rahman Welfare Foundation is running Alfalah Free Dispensary in the town since December 2013, which offers basic health check-up by a qualified doctor and medicines, absolutely free of charge. Alfalah Free Dispensary has provided free medical facility to over 170,000 patients in first seven years of its operation i.e. between 2013- 2020.

== Post office ==
Khudian Post Office was established in 1834. Its post code is 55030. In addition to regular postal and Postal Saving Bank services, this post office works agent location Western Union.

In addition, several courier companies have their offices in the town such as TCS, Leopards, SkyNet and others.
