= Lodhran Junction railway station =

Railway station in Punjab, Pakistan

Lodhran Junction Railway Station لودھراں جنکشن ریلوے اسٹیشن

General information
- Location: Station Road, Lodhran, Punjab 59320
- Coordinates: 29°32′28″N 71°37′22″E
- Owner: Ministry of Railways
- Lines: Karachi–Peshawar Railway Line; Lodhran-Khanewal Branch Line; Lodhran-Raiwind Branch Line

Construction
- Parking: Available
- Accessible: Available

Other information
- Station code: LON

History
- Opened: 1885

Services
Preceding station	Pakistan Railways	Following station
Admwahan towards Kiamari	Karachi–Peshawar Line	Shah Nal towards Peshawar Cantonment
Terminus	Lodhran–Khanewal Chord Line	Shahidanwala towards Khanewal Junction
Terminus	Lodhran–Raiwind Branch Line	Dhanote towards Raiwind Junction
Location
- Location within Punjab, Pakistan Location within Pakistan

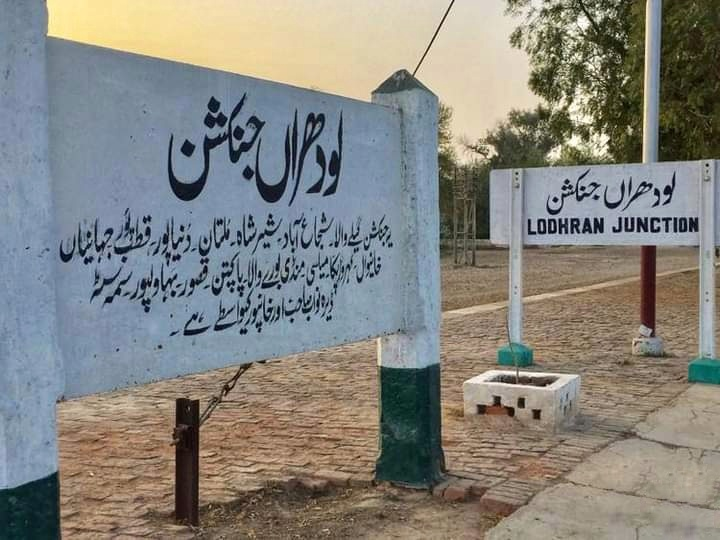
Lodhran Junction Railway Station

Lodhran Junction Railway Station (Urdu and Punjabi: لودھراں جنکشن ریلوے اسٹیشن) is located in Lodhran city, Lodhran district of Punjab province of the Pakistan.

== See also ==
- List of railway stations in Pakistan
- Pakistan Railways
