= Raiwind Junction railway station =

Railway station in Punjab, Pakistan

Raiwind Junction Railway Station رائے ونڈ جنکشن ریلوے اسٹیشن
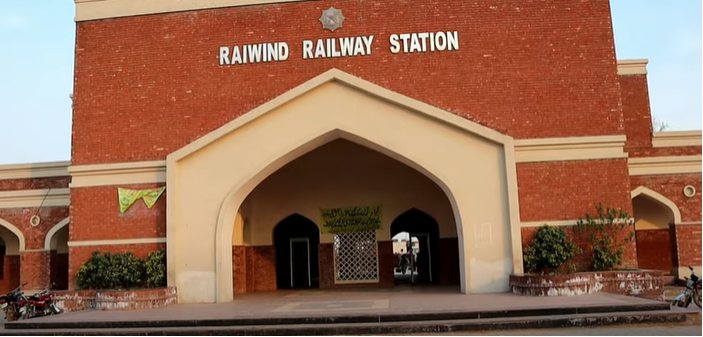

General information
- Coordinates: 31.2517°N 74.2233°E
- Owner: Ministry of Railways
- Lines: Karachi–Peshawar Railway Line; Lodhran–Raiwind Branch Line
- Platforms: 3

Construction
- Parking: Available
- Accessible: Available

Other information
- Station code: RND

History
- Opened: 1922

Services
Preceding station	Pakistan Railways	Following station
Prem Nagar towards Kiamari	Karachi–Peshawar Line	Jia Bagga towards Peshawar Cantonment
Raja Jang towards Lodhran Junction	Lodhran–Raiwind Branch Line	Terminus
Location

Raiwind Junction (Urdu and Punjabi: رائے ونڈ جنکشن ریلوے اسٹیشن) is a railway station Raiwind, Pakistan. It serves as a junction between the Karachi–Peshawar Railway Line and Lodhran–Raiwind Branch Line. It is one of the sub-urban stations of Lahore served by commuter trains. Many commuters use this station to get access to the city of Lahore.

== History ==
In the India-Pakistan war of 1965, Raiwind railway station was a hub of logistic and transport efforts of the 1st Armoured Division which was attacking Khemkaran in India. The station was subjected to frequent attacks by the Indian Air Force.

It was renovated in 2016.

== See also ==
- List of railway stations in Pakistan
- Pakistan Railways
