= Para-Veterinary Institute, Karor Lal-Eason =

Para-veterinary sub-campus in Pakistan

Coordinates: 31.208334°N 70.964088°E

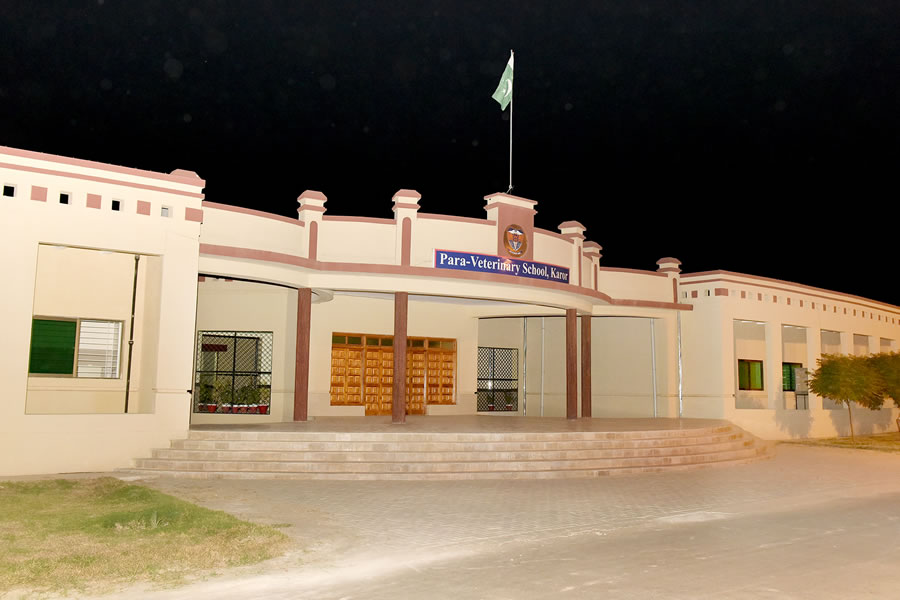
- Type: Public
- Established: 2011
- Affiliations: University of Veterinary and Animal Sciences, Lahore; Pakistan Veterinary Medical Council
- Students: 200
- Location: Karor Lal Esan, Layyah, Punjab, Pakistan
- Nickname: PVI Layyah
- Website: uvas.edu.pk/other_campuses/Layyah/introduction.htm

The Para-Veterinary Institute (PVI) is a sub-campus of the University of Veterinary and Animal Sciences, Lahore (UVAS), located on the bypass road adjacent to Government Degree College in Tehsil Karor Lal Esan, Layyah, Punjab, Pakistan. Established in 2011, it was created to address a shortage of trained para-veterinary workers in the southern areas of Punjab province. The campus occupies ten acres and offers diploma and training programmes in livestock, poultry and dairy subjects, accredited by the Pakistan Veterinary Medical Council (PVMC). The institute is one of several campuses operated by UVAS across Punjab.

== Background ==
Southern Punjab faces a shortage of trained para-veterinary personnel, including veterinary assistants and artificial insemination technicians. The institute was established under the supervision of UVAS to provide skilled manpower for this region. The livestock sector is a significant source of livelihood in the area; in the villages of southern Punjab, a substantial proportion of women are directly involved in daily livestock tasks such as milking, feeding and general animal management.

== Campus ==
The campus occupies a ten-acre site next to Government Boys Degree College on the bypass road, Tehsil Karor Lal-Eason, District Layyah. Facilities include an administration block, hostel, outdoor veterinary dispensary, experimental animal shed, laboratory, computer laboratory, classrooms, a residential colony for employees, and grounds. Students also have access to the departments and laboratories of the UVAS main campus in Lahore.

== Programmes ==
The institute offers the following accredited programmes:

- Two-year Livestock Assistant Diploma (morning and evening)
- Two-year Poultry Assistant Diploma (morning and evening)
- One-year Dairy Herd Supervisor Diploma
- Training of Community Livestock Extension Workers (CLEWs)
- Training of Artificial Insemination Assistants (AIAs)
- Training for livestock farmers and breeders
- Training of unskilled manpower in livestock production and management

== See also ==
- Pakistan Veterinary Medical Council
- University of Veterinary and Animal Sciences, Lahore
- Cholistan University of Veterinary and Animal Sciences, Bahawalpur
- University of Veterinary and Animal Sciences (Ravi Campus)
- College of Veterinary and Animal Sciences, Jhang
