= Bhai Kot =

Bhai Kot 3
- Village
- Location within Pakistan
- Coordinates: 30°56′56″N 73°44′36″E
- Country: Pakistan
- Province: Punjab
- District: Kasur
- Time zone: UTC+5 (PST)

Bhai Kot (Chak No. 03) is a village in the Pattoki Tehsil, Kasur District, Punjab, Pakistan, about 3 kilometres (1.9 mi) from Pattoki. population of this village consists of Malik ,Meos. Other Caste include Jutt and Dogars but are in a minority. There are two primary schools in the village, one for girls and one for boys.
