= Naroki =

- Town
- Location within Pakistan
- Coordinates: 32.097263°N 74.144195°E
- Country: Pakistan
- Province: Punjab
- District: Kasur
- Tehsil: Pattoki

Naroki is a town in Pattoki, Punjab, Pakistan. It is situated 2 kilometres (1.2 mi) from Pattoki City. Naroki is divided into different Ismail Town, Hameed Town and Mal Khan Town.

== Ismail Town ==
Ismail Town is situated in Naroki 1 kilometre (0.62 mi) from the tomb of Hazrat Baba Abbas.
