= Sehjowal railway station =

Railway station in Punjab, Pakistan

Sehjowal Railway Station سہجووال ریلوے اسٹیشن

General information
- Coordinates: 30.9792°N 73.7864°E
- Owner: Ministry of Railways
- Line: Karachi–Peshawar Railway Line

Other information
- Status: Closed
- Station code: SJWL

Services
Preceding station	Pakistan Railways	Following station
Habibabad towards Kiamari	Karachi–Peshawar Line	Pattoki towards Peshawar Cantonment
Location

Sehjowal Railway Station (Urdu and Punjabi: سہجووال ریلوے اسٹیشن) is an abandoned railway station located in Sehjowal village, Kasur district of Punjab province, Pakistan.

== See also ==
- List of railway stations in Pakistan
- Pakistan Railways
