= Halla, Punjab =

Halla
- Town
- Location within Pakistan
- Coordinates: 30°56′56″N 73°44′36″E
- Country: Pakistan
- Province: Punjab
- District: Kasur
- Time zone: UTC+5 (PST)

Halla (Urdu: ہلّہ), is a town and Union Council situated near Pattoki in Pattoki Tehsil of Kasur District in the Punjab province of Pakistan. It is located at 31°7'9N 73°43'24E with an altitude of 178 metres (587 feet). It is located on bank of Lower Bari Doaab.
