= Pattoki Tehsil =

Pattoki Tehsil تحصِيل پتّوكى
- Tehsil
- Interactive map of Pattoki Tehsil
- Country: Pakistan
- Region: (Punjab, Pakistan) Punjab
- District: Kasur
- Capital: Pattoki
- Towns: 1
- Union councils: 13

Population (2017)
  - Tehsil: 934,329
  - Urban: 180,466
  - Rural: 753,863
- Time zone: UTC+5 (PST)
  - Summer (DST): UTC+6 (PDT)

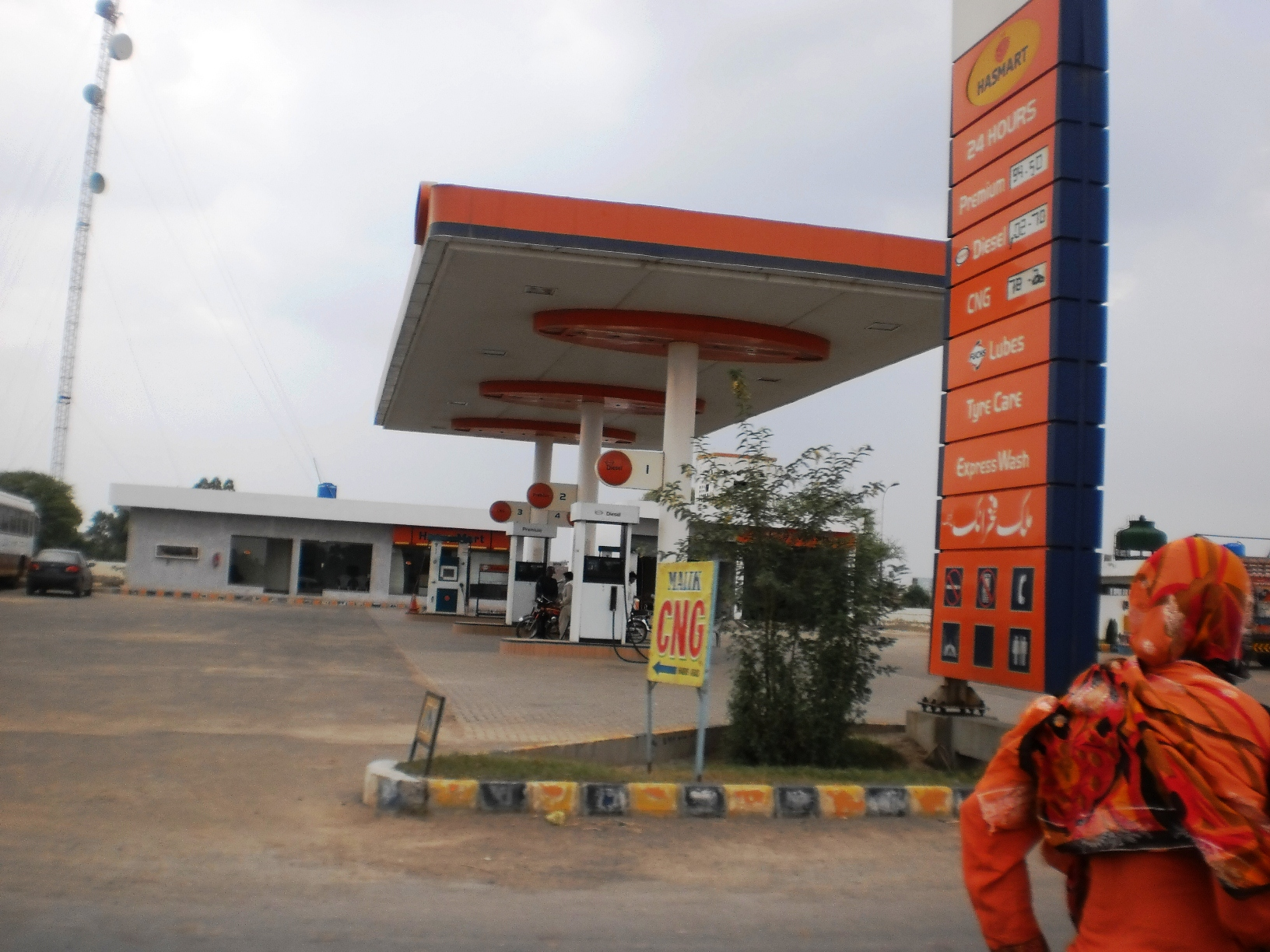
A CNG station near Habib Abad, in Pattoki tehsil, Punjab, Pakistan

Pattoki Tehsil (Urdu: تحصِيل پتّوكى), is an administrative subdivision (tehsil) of Kasur District in the Punjab province of Pakistan. The market town of Pattoki is the headquarters of the tehsil.

== Administration ==
The tehsil of Pattoki is administratively subdivided into 32 Union Councils, these are:

- Alpa Kalan
- Baghiana Kalan
- Beharwal Kalan
- Bhoe Asal
- Bhopaywal
- Chak No 35
- Chak No 3
- Chak No 39
- Padhana chack No 45
- Dholan Chak No 27
- Dina Nath Chak 66
- Ghummankay
- Gulzar Jageer
- Habibabad
- Halla
- Hanjrai Kalan
- Jambar
- Kanween
- Khankay Mor
- Kot Sardar Khan
- Kothiwala Chak No 7
- Narroki Mahja
- Nathay Khalisa
- Pattoki No 1
- Pattoki No 2
- Pattoki No 3
- Phoolnagar No 1
- Phoolnagar No 2
- Phoolnagar No 3
- Phulliani
- Sarai Naushehra
- Shaikham
- Wan Aadhan
