= Tara Garh =

تارا گڑھ
- Village
- Tara Garh
- Location within Pakistan
- Coordinates: 31.0982°N 73.8179°E
- Country: Pakistan
- Province: Punjab

Government
  - klairs: shahwaiz

Area
  - Total: 3 km^{2} (1.2 sq mi)

Population (klairs bladri)
  - Total: 1,000
  - Density: 1,000/km^{2} (2,600/sq mi)
- Time zone: UTC+5 (PST)

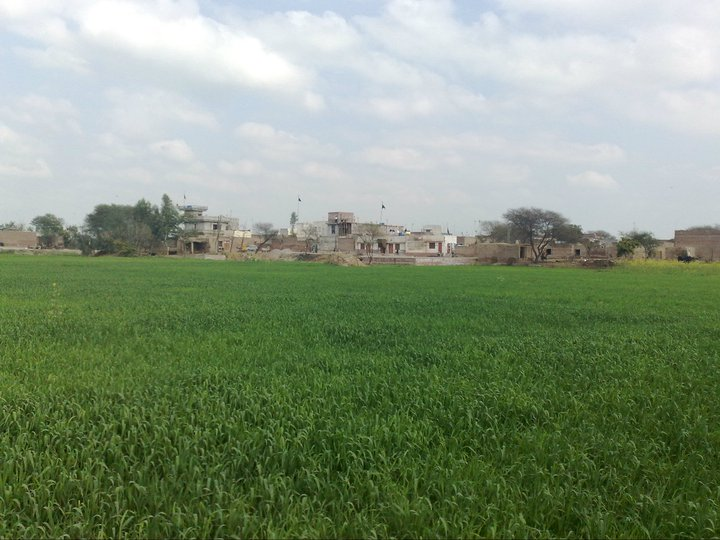
village view

Tara Garh (Urdu: تارا گڑھ), (Gurmukhi: ਤਾਰਾ ਗੜ੍ਹ) is a village in the Pattoki tehsil of Kasur District in the Punjab (Pakistan). the village is based on a single nation known as klair bradri .

- The religion is Islam. The peoples of the village are very cooperative and have much awareness of religious works and the peoples of the village has built up two mosques by their own incomes. But about 3 to 4 hundreds years the nation belongs to Sikh-isms.
- CLIMATE REVIEWS Most areas in Punjab experience extreme weather with foggy winters, often accompanied by rain. By mid-February the temperature begins to rise;springtime weather continues until mid-April, when the summer heat sets in. The route from Dera Ghazi Khan to Fort Munro The onset of the southwest monsoon is anticipated to reach Punjab by May, but since the early 1970s the weather pattern has been irregular. The spring monsoon has either skipped over the area or has caused it to rain so hard that floods have resulted. June and July are oppressively hot. Although official estimates rarely place the temperature above 46 °C, newspaper sources claim that it reaches 51 °C and regularly carry reports about people who have succumbed to the heat. Heat records were broken in Multan in June 1993, when the mercury was reported to have risen to 54 °C. In August the oppressive heat is punctuated by the rainy season, referred to as barsat, which brings relief in its wake. The hardest part of the summer is then over, but cooler weather does not come until late October.
  - Hot weather (April to June) when temperature rises as high as 110 °F.
  - Rainy season (July to September). Average rainfall annual ranges between 96 cm sub-mountain region and 46 cm in the plains.
  - Cooler/ Foggy / mild weather (October to March). Temperature goes down as low as 40 °F.
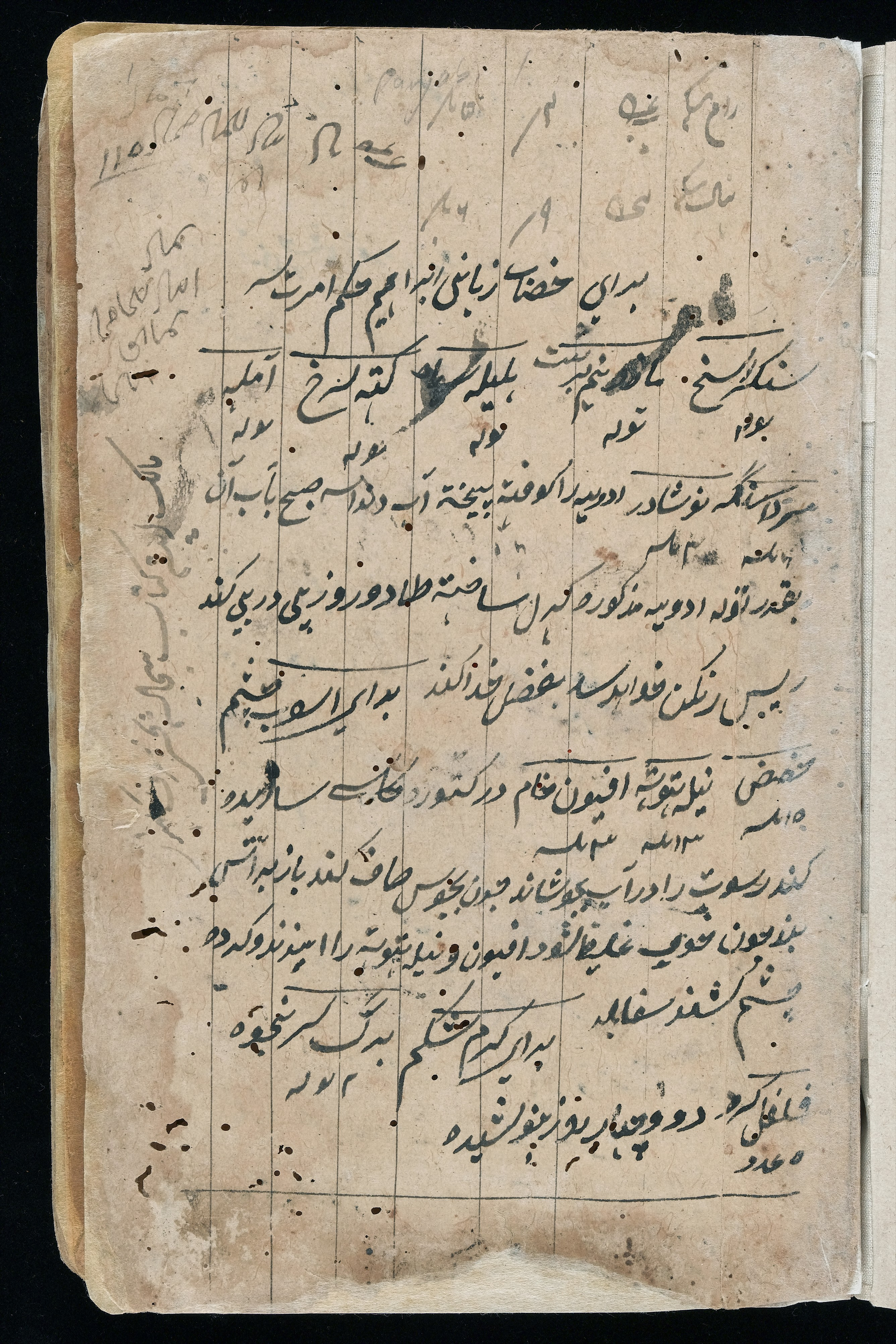
    local language
  - The native language of the province is Punjabi with its Standard dialect spoken in north and its Saraiki dialect spoken in southern districts of the province. There is growing pressure for official recognition of Saraiki as a language distinct from Punjabi.^{[10]}
  - Urdu, Pakistan's national language, is widely understood and used.
