= Christianized sites =

Interpretatio Christiana strategic method

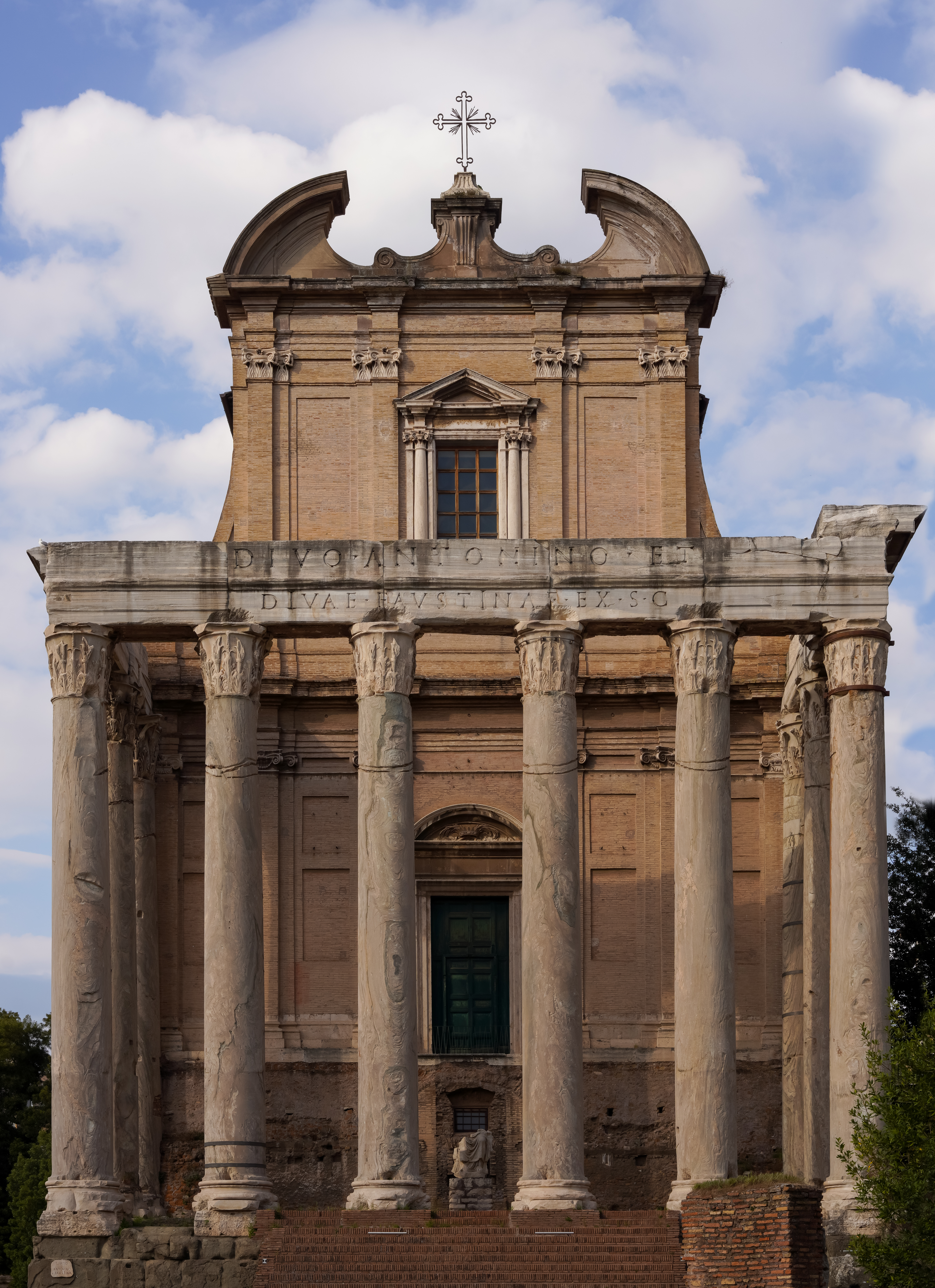
San Lorenzo in Miranda occupies the Temple of Antoninus and Faustina, Rome, conserving the pronaos.

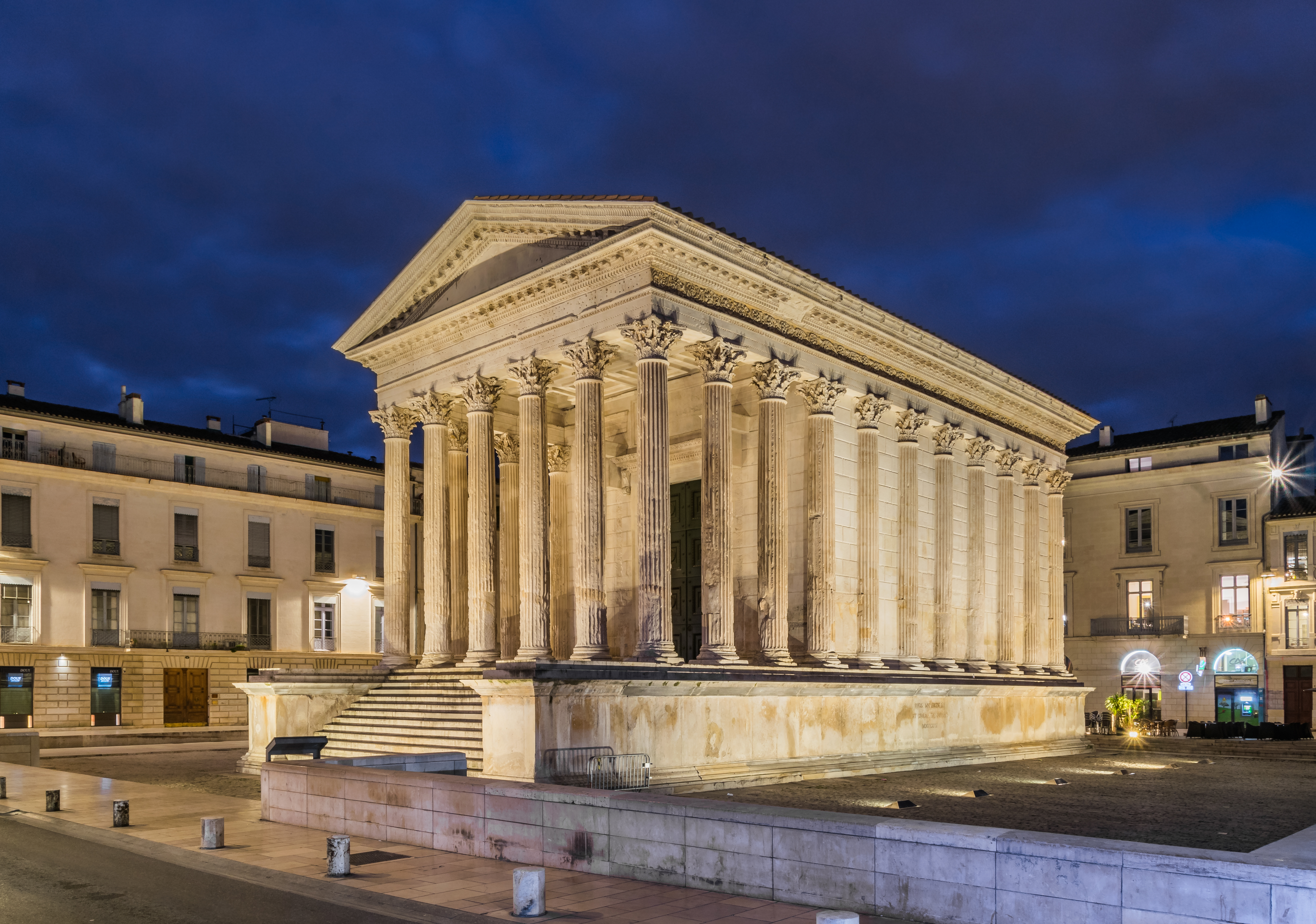
The Temple of Gaius and Lucius, known today as the Maison Carrée at Nîmes, owes its preservation to its conversion to a church.

The Christianization of sites that had been pagan occurred as a result of conversions in early Christian times, as well as an important part of the strategy of Interpretatio Christiana ("Christian reinterpretation") during the Christianization of pagan peoples. (Note: This kind of conversion is not solely a feature of Christianity; the phenomenon was discussed in broader terms by F.W. Hasluck, Christianity and Islam under the Sultans (Oxford) 1929.) The landscape itself was Christianized, as prominent features were rededicated to Christian saints, sometimes quite directly, as when the island of Oglasa in the Tyrrhenian Sea was christened Montecristo.

== Early Christianity ==
In the first centuries of Christianity churches were either house churches in whatever houses were offered for use by their owners, or were shrines on the burial-sites of martyrs or saints, which following the usual classical practice were invariably on the (then) edges of cities—the necropolis was always outside the polis. In Rome the early basilica churches of St. Peter's, Saint Paul Outside the Walls and San Lorenzo fuori le Mura, all follow this pattern. This distinction was gradually broken down, perhaps earliest in Roman Africa, as relics of the saints came to be kept in city-centre churches. By the 6th century bishops were often buried inside their cathedral, and other Christians followed.

Given the plethora of worship locations for various cults, many had fallen into disuse well before the rise of Christianity. The establishment of a third century Roman military camp in the temple complex at Luxor demonstrates an ongoing process of adaptive re-use. Obsolete temples often had their stone elements repurposed for use in new construction.

After the Peace of the Church, the old pagan temples continued to function but gradually fell into disuse, and were finally all closed by the decrees of Theodosius I at the end of the 4th century. Initially they were shunned by Christians, perhaps because of their pagan associations, but also because their shape did not suit Christian requirements: "To the early Church, only one sort of building seemed suitable for christianization: the basilica", which had previously always been a secular type of building.

== Ancient Rome and Greece ==
=== Rome ===
In Rome itself, numerous buildings including pagan temples and other sites were converted into churches, and several major archeological sites owe their preservation to this. On the Roman Forum alone, the Curia Iulia or Roman Senate building (Sant'Adriano in Foro), the Temple of Antoninus and Faustina (San Lorenzo in Miranda), and the Temple of Romulus (Santi Cosma e Damiano) were transformed into churches, and the churches of San Giuseppe dei Falegnami and San Pietro in Carcere were built above the Mamertine Prison nearby, where Sts. Peter and Paul were reputed to have been held.

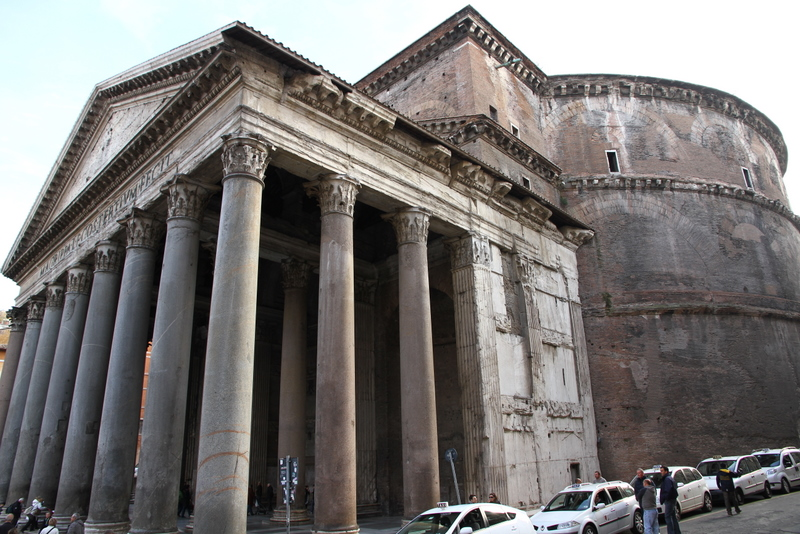
"Santa Maria Rotonda" (Pantheon)

The Pantheon in Rome was once a temple dedicated to the Roman gods and it was converted to a Roman Catholic church dedicated to St. Mary and the Martyrs. Eventually the prime sites of the pagan temples were very often occupied for churches, the church of Santa Maria sopra Minerva (literally Saint Mary above Minerva) in Rome, Christianized about 750, being simply the most obvious example. The Basilica of Junius Bassus was made a church in the late fifth century. However this process did not really begin in Rome itself until the 6th and 7th centuries, and was still under way during the Renaissance, when the Pantheon (which had been made a church in the 7th century) and Santa Maria degli Angeli e dei Martiri and San Bernardo alle Terme made from parts of the enormous Baths of Diocletian.

One of the most richly adorned churches, the Basilica di San Clemente, was, according to Christian tradition, built on top of Titus Flavius Clemens's private home, as he had allowed early Christians to worship in his home, due to having pro-Jewish sympathies. The conversion of pre-Christian places of worship, rather than their destruction, was particularly true of temples of Mithras, a religion that had been the main rival to Christianity during the 2nd and 3rd centuries, especially among the Roman legions. An early 2nd century Mithraeum stands across the Roman street from the house and can be visited. Other Mithraea have been excavated under churches, such as Santa Prisca, and Santo Stefano Rotondo.

Several churches, especially in Rome, are said to have been built on the sites of the earlier burial places of martyrs in the catacombs of Rome or elsewhere. The sanctification of burial places, and placing tombs inside churches, was a novelty of Christianity, and a break with pagan tradition, where burials were regarded as unclean, and usually only allowed beyond a set distance from a city's walls.

=== Vatican ===
St. Peter's Basilica, the church of the Vatican, is traditionally located at the burial place of Simon Peter, and most scholars parties agree that the basilica was built on top of a large necropolis on the Vatican Hill. In 1939, an excavation underneath the grottoes which lie directly under the current Basilica, uncovered several surviving Roman mausoleums from the necropolis, and in the area directly under the high altar, below the grottoes, the excavators found a structure resembling a temple that they named the aedicula (meaning little temple).

=== Greece ===
In Greece, the occupation of pagan sites by Christian monasteries and churches was ubiquitous. Hellenic Aphrodisias in Caria was renamed Stauropolis, the "City of the Cross".

Allison Franz argues that it was only after temples ceased to be regarded as serious cult sites that they were later converted to churches. "So it was by virtue of necessity rather than in token of a victorious faith that the temples of the old dispensation became the province of the new."

Exceptions to this are the conversion of the Askepieion in Athens around 529, and both the Hephaisteion and Athena's temple at the Parthenon, during the seventh century, reflecting possible conflict between Christians and non-Christians. In Byzantine times, the Parthenon became the Church of the Parthenos Maria (Virgin Mary), or the Church of the Theotokos (Mother of God). It was the fourth most important pilgrimage in the Eastern Roman Empire after Constantinople, Ephessos and Thessalonica.

== Middle Ages ==
Cassiodorus, the court secretary to the Ostrogoth Theodoric the Great, described in a letter written in AD 527, a fair held at a former pagan shrine of Leucothea, in the still culturally Greek region of south Italy, which had been Christianized by converting it to a baptistery (Variae 8.33).

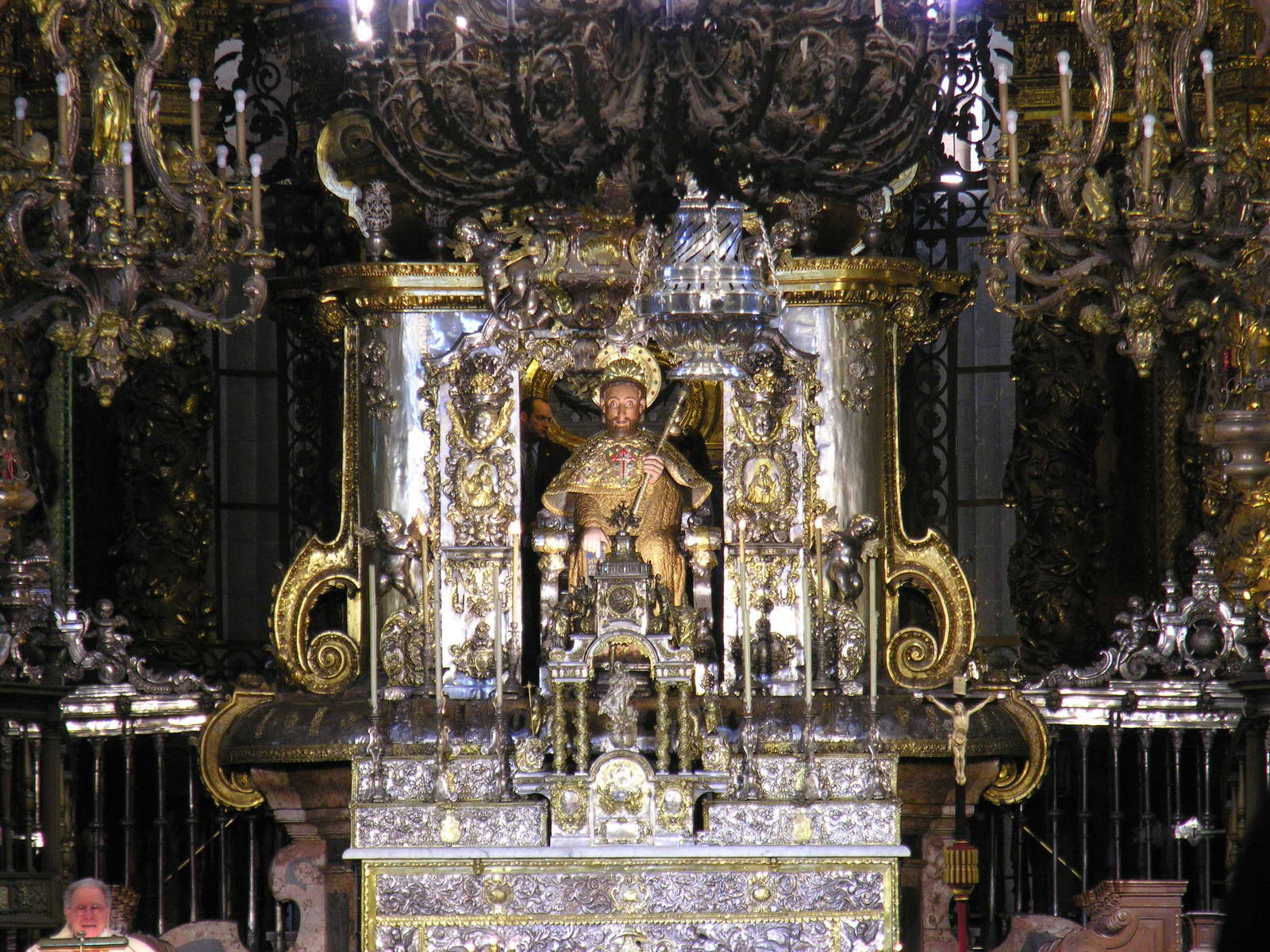
The shrine of Saint James at Compostela

Sulpicius Severus, in his Vita of Martin of Tours, wrote, "wherever he destroyed heathen temples, there he used immediately to build either churches or monasteries", and when Benedict of Nursia took possession of the site at Monte Cassino, he began by smashing the sculpture of Apollo and the altar that crowned the height. Montmartre (originally Mons Martis, "Mount of Mars", later re-interpreted as Mons martyris, "Mountain of the martyr") was the site of one of the oldest surviving Christian churches in France—Saint Pierre was earlier a mercurii monte—a high place dedicated to Lugus, a major Celtic deity (and one that the Romans viewed as a homology of Mercury).

In Francia, the site chosen for the abbey of Luxueil were the ruins of a well-fortified Gallo-Roman settlement, Luxovium, that had been ravaged by Attila in 451, and was now buried in the dense overgrown woodland that had filled the abandoned site over more than a century; the place still had the advantage of the thermal baths ("constructed with unusual skill", according to Columbanus' early biographer, Jonas of Bobbio) down in the valley, which still give the town its name of Luxeuil-les-Bains. Jonas described it further: "There stone images crowded the nearby woods, which were honoured in the miserable cult and profane former rites in the time of the pagans". With a grant from an officer of the palace at Childebert's court, an abbey church was built within the heathen site and its "spectral haunts".

The Notre-Dame du Taur (Our Lady of the Bull), cathedral church of Toulouse, which is famous for the Encierro festival of running bulls, is thought by archaeologists to possibly be a converted temple of Mithras, whose myth focused on the tauroctony, the killing of a sacred bull.

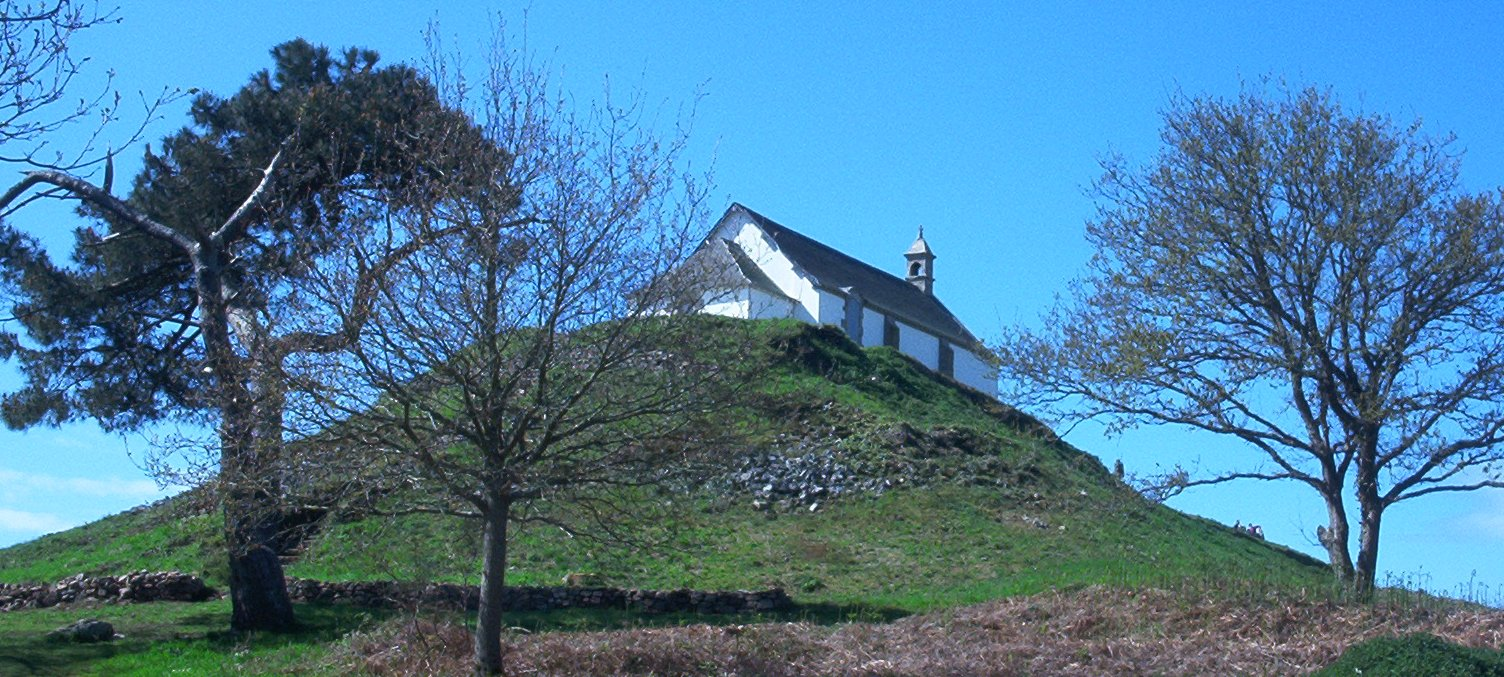
Neolithic Tumulus topped by a Catholic church in Carnac

Among the country people (pagani) as Jean Seznec observed that euhemerist dismissal by Christian writers of pagan deities as once having been human was insufficient cause to abandon old ways: "in country districts, the chief obstacle to Christianity was offered by the tenacious survival of anthropomorphic cults; here the problem became one of still further humanizing the divinities of springs, trees and mountains, in order to rob them of their prestige".

Samuel J. Barish found further examples of the transition from miraculous springs to baptisteries from Gregory of Tours (died c. 594) and Maximus, Bishop of Turin (died c. 466).

=== Britain and Northern Europe ===
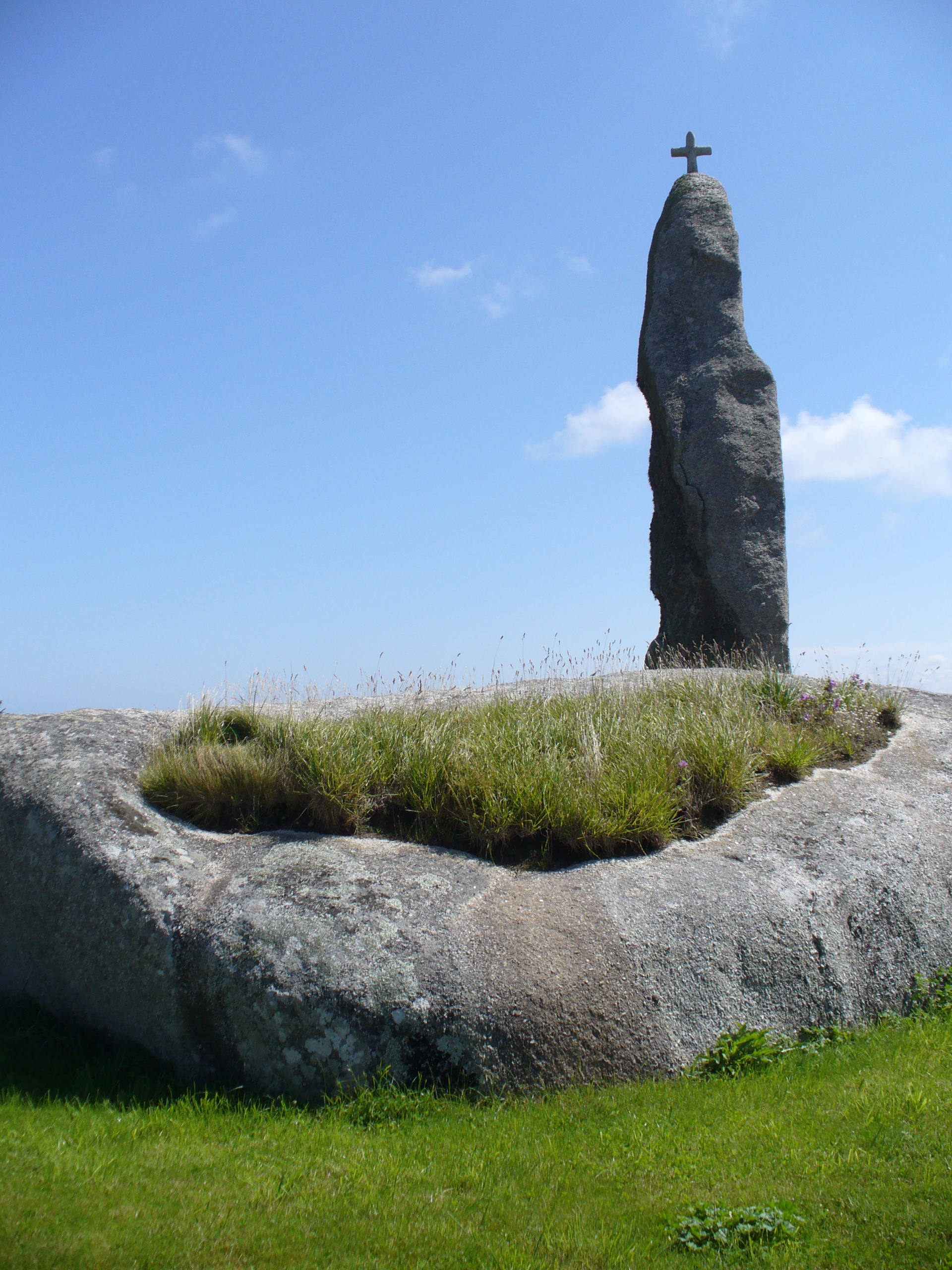
A menhir in Brittany has been topped with a cross.

In Britain, the legendary King Lucius, was reported by Geoffrey of Monmouth, the often unreliable Christian chronicler, to have deliberately converted all the old temples to churches. The historical reality is discussed in a letter from Pope Gregory I to Mellitus, who was about to join Augustine of Kent among the Anglo-Saxons:

So when almighty God has led you to the most reverend man our brother Bishop Augustine, tell him what I have long gone over in my mind concerning the matter of the English: that is, that the shrines of idols amongst that people should be destroyed as little as possible, but that the idols themselves that are inside them should be destroyed. Let blessed water be made and sprinkled in these shrines, let altars be constructed and relics placed there: since if the shrines are well built it is necessary that they should be converted from the worship of demons to the service of the true God, so that as long as that people do not see their very shrines being destroyed they may put out error from their hearts and in knowledge and adoration of the true God they may gather at their accustomed places more readily.

A tradition grew that St Peter upon Cornhill church in London was founded by Lucius in AD 199. Interestingly the high altar of the church is sited directly above the potential site of a pagan shrine room (aedes), within the great Roman London basilica. it would make the church contemporaneous to the possible Romano-British church at Silchester, similarly built adjacent to the Roman Basilica and most likely pre-Constantine in age.

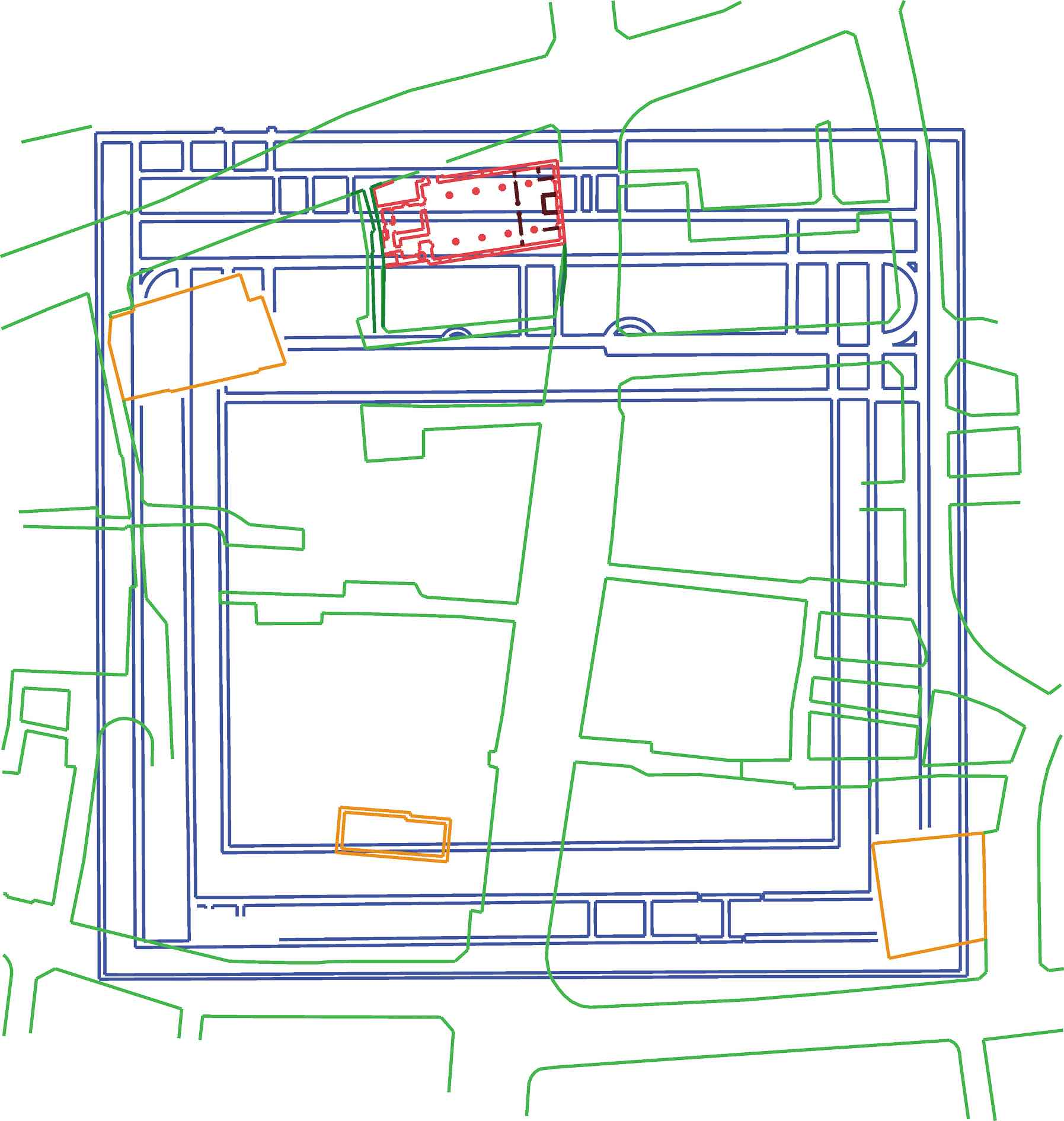
St Peter upon Cornhill church and location above London Roman Forum

Some caution may be exercised in this respect however, as other research suggests it very rare for early english christian churches to be founded in pagan temples, and that when temples were turned into churches, this occurred later, in the late sixth century onwards. Historians seem to be more confident that early english christian churches met in private homes and villas belonging the wealthy.

Several Roman pagan sites in Britain may have been converted to Christian use in the 4th Century, such as the Temple of Claudius in Roman Colchester and two of the seven Romano-Celtic Temples in the town, all of which underwent restructuring in the 300s AD and around which have been found early Christian symbols such as the Chi Rho.

The British Isles and other areas of northern Europe that were formerly druidic are still densely punctuated by holy wells and holy springs that are now attributed to some local saint. An example of the pre-Christian water spirit is the melusina.

In Britain and many other parts of Europe trees were also sometimes seen as sacred or the home of tree spirits. When Britain was Christianized this resulted in a change of the landscape. In some instances sacred groves were destroyed to discourage belief in tree spirits. One of the most famous of these was the Irminsul, whose ancient location is no longer known (though it may have been located at Externsteine), was obliterated by Charlemagne. Another major ancient holy tree was Thor's Oak, which was deliberately desecrated and destroyed by a Christian missionary named Winfrid (later canonised as Saint Boniface).

In Britain and the Celtic northwest of Europe, the divinities of springs were transformed into local saints who were often venerated only at the location of their "holy well".

=== Iberian Peninsula ===
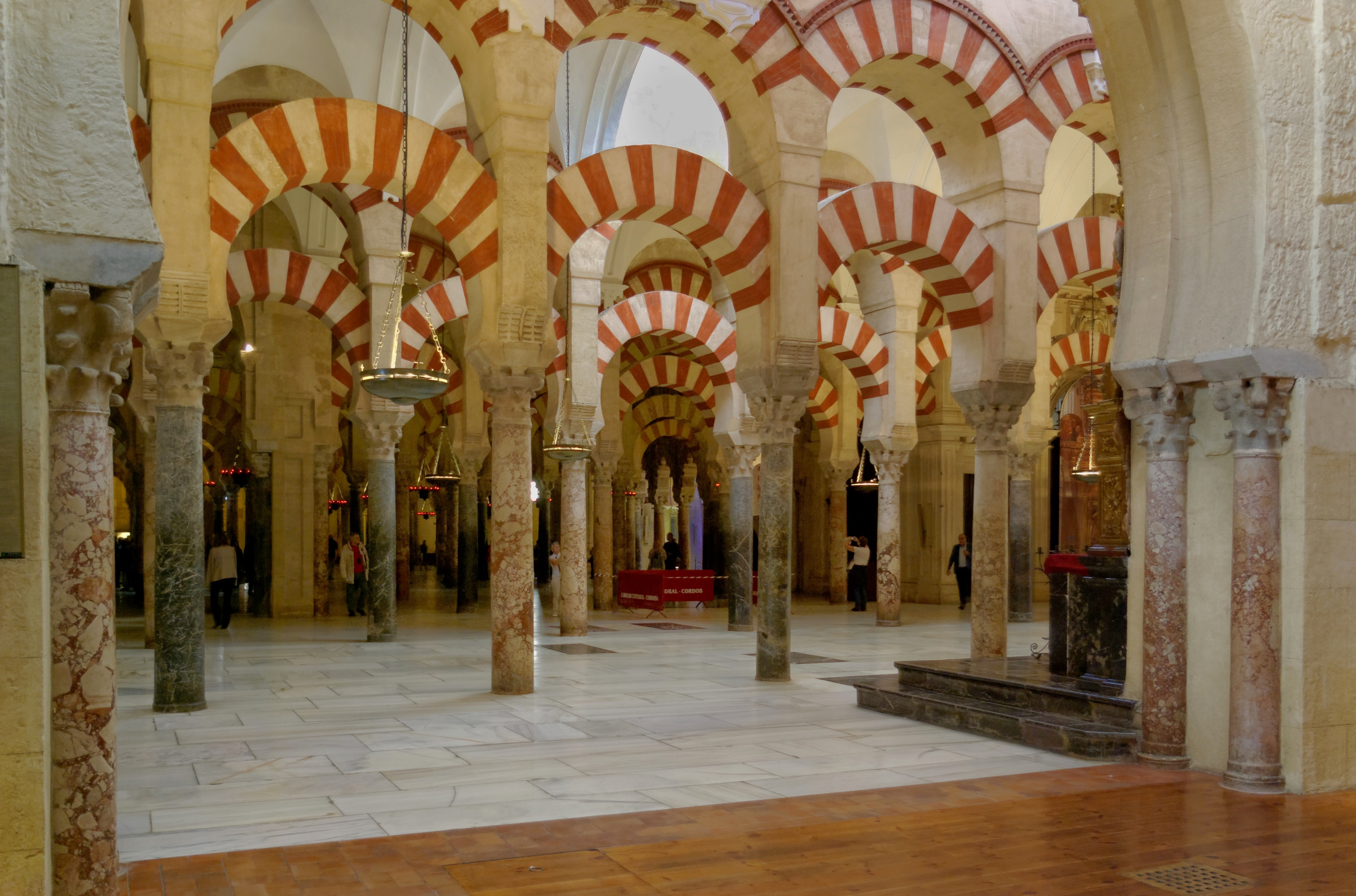
Cathedral–Mosque of Córdoba, Initially a pagan worship place, then converted into church, and then the Umayyad Moors built a mosque on the site, which is now reconverted into a Christian cathedral

Sometime toward the end of the fifth century, an abandoned "mithraeum" near present-day Motaro, was rebuilt as a church.

During the Spanish Reconquista Christian populations were often brought to an area with the goal of re-establishing a Christian base, one that would be loyal to the Crown of Castile and whose culture would supplant that of the invading Moorish and Arab peoples; for example Murcia. During the process of Christianization, many of the conquered city's mosques were destroyed or reconverted into Catholic churches since most of the mosques were built on the sites of pre existing Christian structures. Typically the great Friday mosques were reconverted into cathedrals, such as the Great Mosque of Cordoba reconverted into a cathedral in 1236, as it was a church before the Arab-Muslim invasion.

Santiago de Compostela is a major site of Christian pilgrimage, and said in Christian tradition to originate as the burial place of Saint James the Great; pilgrims traditionally follow the Way of St. James until they reach the Cathedral, but then, having visited the church, continue to Cape Finisterre. The continuation to Cape Finisterre is regarded by historians as unjustifiable for Christian reasons, but Finisterre has a prominent pre-Christian significance, it was considered to literally be the edge of the world (hence the name finisterre, meaning end of the world), due to it seeming to be the westernmost point of Europe (in reality, even though it juts out to the west, the more subtle Cabo da Roca holds the honour). In pre-Christian times, the souls of the dead were believed to trace their way across all Europe to Finisterre and follow the sun across the sea, and their route, the Santa Compaña, became a significant pilgrimage throughout south western Europe. Santiago de Compostela itself was held to be the place where the dead gathered together, and where their paths finally all joined together for the final stretch of the journey; one possible etymology of Compostela is burial ground, suggesting that even the name derives from the pre-Christian belief.

During the Reconquista and the Crusades, the cross served the symbolic function of physical possession that a flag would occupy today. At the siege of Lisbon in 1147, when a mixed group of Christians took the city, "What great joy and what a great abundance there was of pious tears when, to the praise and honor of God and of the most Holy Virgin Mary the saving cross was placed atop the highest tower to be seen by all as a symbol of the city's subjection."

== New World ==
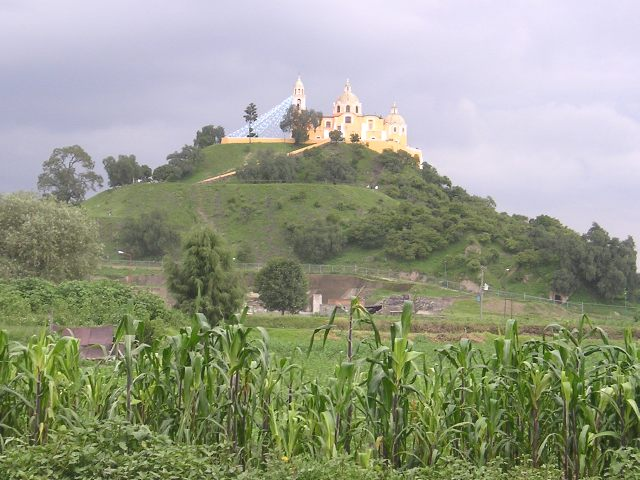
Nuestra Señora de los Remedios does not efface the Great Pyramid of Cholula, Mexico.

The Spanish in the New World converted many Native American temples into churches, following their procedure in Spain against Muslim mosques, which were often originally Christian churches. The Mexico City Metropolitan Cathedral was built on an Aztec temple. Few Native American sites in North America could compare with the pyramid temples of Mexico and Central America. Often the Christianized site in Spanish America gives no indication of its former use, as at the site of a pyramid shrine to the god Huitzilopochtli that was dismantled to provide stone for the Franciscan monastery that now houses the Museo Nacional de las Intervenciones.

== Balkans ==
During the Ottoman conquest of the Balkans in the 15th century, many churches were converted into mosques with a minaret added, in the 19th century many former church-mosques were re-converted into churches and their minarets destroyed, such as the Church of Prophet Elijah, Thessaloniki. After the Christian Balkan states obtained independence from the Muslim Ottoman Empire, they destroyed Ottoman mosques. In many cases the minarets of the mosques were destroyed while the mosque itself was converted into a church or left to decay. The Sveti Sedmochislenitsi Church in Sofia was a 15th-century abandoned Ottoman mosque, converted into a church in the 19th century. In Croatia the only three remaining mosques from the Ottoman period, those in Đakovo, Klis and Drniš, have been converted or re-converted into Catholic churches.

== South Asia ==
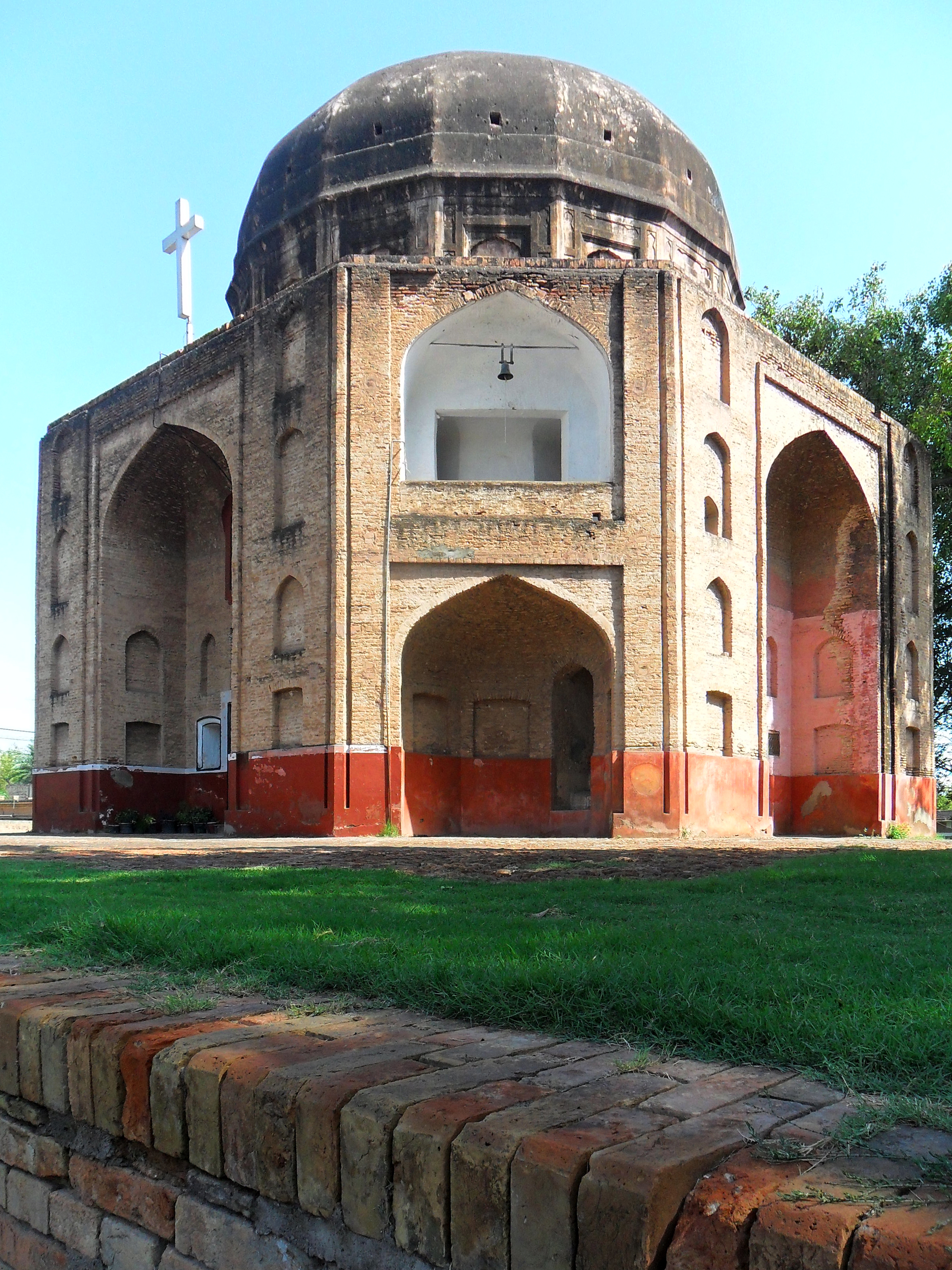
The tomb of Nawab Sayyed Khan from 1651 in Peshawar was converted into a chapel during the British colonial period.

The objective of Goa Inquisition was to enforce Catholic orthodoxy and allegiance to the Holy See. Conversions took place through the Goan Inquisition with the persecution of Hindus and the destruction of Hindu temples.

Some 160 temples were razed to the ground on the Goa island by 1566.

Between 1566 and 1567, a campaign by Franciscan missionaries destroyed another 300 Hindu temples in Bardez (North Goa).

In Salcete (South Goa), approximately another 300 Hindu temples were destroyed by the Christian officials of the Inquisition.

During the British colonial period, some non-Christian sites were converted into use for Christians.

The Tomb of Anarkali, built in 1615, was temporarily converted into an Anglican church dedicated to St. James in 1851 (after being used as a clerical office), until a church was built for the congregation in 1891. Today, it serves its original purpose, as a tomb.

The Tomb of Nawab Sayyed Khan in Peshawar, built in 1651 for the Mughal governor of the Peshawar and Kabul region, was converted into a chapel for use by missionaries, and remains in use as such to this day.

In the Pakistani village of Maraka, Punjab, Sikh converts to Christianity have repurposed their shrine of Baba Gur Bakshi—a follower of Guru Nanak, into a Christian site.

== See also ==
- Conversion of non-Islamic places of worship into mosques
- Christianization of saints and feasts
- Christianity and other religions
- Christianization

== Literature ==
- Curran, John 2000. Pagan City and Christian Capital. (Oxford) ISBN 0-19-815278-7. Reviewed by Fred S. Kleiner in Bryn Mawr Classical Review 20
- Kaplan, Steven 1984 Monastic Holy Man and the Christianization of Early Solomonic Ethiopia (in series Studien zur Kulturkunde) ISBN 3-515-03934-1
- Kerenyi, Karl, Dionysus: Archetypal Image of Indestructible Life 1976.
- Lavan, Luke, and Mulryan, Michael, 2011. The Archaeology of Late Antique ‘Paganism’. Brill ISBN 978-90-04-19237-9
- MacMullen, Ramsay, Christianizing the Roman Empire, AD 100 – 400 Yale University Press (paperback, 1986 ISBN 0-300-03642-6)
- Syndicus, Eduard (1962). Early Christian Art. London: Burns & Oates.
- Trombley, Frank R., 1995. Hellenic Religion and Christianization c. 370–529 (in series Religions in the Graeco-Roman World) (Brill) ISBN 90-04-09691-4
- Vesteinsson, Orri, 2000. The Christianization of Iceland: Priests, Power, and Social Change 1000-1300 (Oxford:Oxford University Press) ISBN 0-19-820799-9
- Williams, Mark F. (2005). The making of Christian communities in late antiquity and the middle ages. London: Anthem Press. ISBN 1-898855-77-3. OCLC 59667880.
