= Clarkabad =

Christian village in Punjab, Pakistan

- Village
- Interactive map of Clarkabad
- Coordinates: 31°10′44″N 74°09′05″E
- Country: Pakistan
- Province: Punjab
- District: Kasur
- Time zone: UTC+5 (PST)

Clarkabad is a Christian-majority village located in Kasur, Punjab, Pakistan. It is located in the Kot Radha Krishan tehsil.

== History ==
It was founded by an English missionary, Robert Clark who purchased 1900 acres of land from the government. He bought the Christians all over from Punjab for agricultural work. Some muslims from Lohar and Dhobi community also settled here.

The land, which was drained once canal system established, was allocated to the Christian farmers.

== Infrastructure ==
The Punjab Christians Ministries International Trust Hospital was built in the 2010s by a Pakistani Diaspora Christian.
