= University of Veterinary and Animal Sciences =

University in Lahore, Pakistan

- Former names: College of Veterinary Sciences
- Type: Public university
- Established: 1882
- Affiliations: Higher Education Commission (Pakistan); Pakistan Veterinary Medical Council
- Chancellor: Governor of the Punjab
- Vice-Chancellor: Prof. Dr. Masood Rabbani
- Registrar: Sajjad Haider
- Students: ~6,200+
- Location: Lahore, Punjab, Pakistan
- Campus: University of Veterinary and Animal Sciences (Ravi Campus), Cholistan University of Veterinary and Animal Sciences
- Colours: Crimson, White, RYB
- Nickname: UVAS
- Website: uvas.edu.pk

The University of Veterinary and Animal Sciences, or UVAS originally known as Lahore Veterinary College, is a public university located in Lahore, Punjab, Pakistan.

== Accredited university ==
This university is accredited by the Higher Education Commission of Pakistan (HEC) and Pakistan Veterinary Medical Council (PVMC).

== Additional campuses ==
It has three additional teaching campuses, in Pattoki, Jhang and Narowal.

== History ==
Established in 1882, it is one of the oldest institution of veterinary sciences and microbiology in Asia and one of the earliest institution founded by Great Britain in the Indian subcontinent. Since its inception, it maintained its reoccupation as one of the famous and renowned institution of veterinary and animal sciences and conducts wide range of research in microbiology and development of human resources. It was also affiliated with University of Agriculture, Faisalabad for some years and then become a distinct entity. The university offers undergraduate, post-graduate and doctoral programs in diverse fields of animals health, food irradiation, security and safety. The university maintains its highest ranks and regarded as one of the top university in "agriculture/veterinary" category by the Higher Education Commission (Pakistan) (HEC), as of 2012.

In June 2002, on the up gradation of the college of veterinary sciences to the status of the University, Punjab Government allotted about 1000 Acres at Pattoki for the establishment of the sub campus for the education and research work activities. This is named as University of Veterinary and Animal Sciences (Ravi Campus). Aim/Vision/Objectives To impart quality education with rich opportunities of Hands on Training & research. Development of about 1000 acres of land taken over from Government of Punjab. Preparation of land for cultivation of fodder for experimental animals Production of fodder for University farms (Dairy & Small Ruminants) Sowing of fodder cash crops etc. for income generation

Commercialization of research and expertise from the university also plays and generates significant economic growth and business opportunities in Pakistan, as many recommendation by university's think tanks are adopted by the government. The university's own program is focused towards building efforts on poverty reduction, prosperity, livestock production and building a generation of trained manpower in the country.

== Academic Divisions ==
There are five faculties and four institutes working.

- Faculty of Veterinary Sciences (FVS)
- Faculty of Biosciences (FBS)
- Faculty of Animal Production & Technology (FAPT)
- Faculty of Fisheries and Wildlife (FF&W)
- Faculty of Life Sciences Business Management (FLSBM)
- Institute of Biochemistry & Biotechnology
- Institute of Continuing Education & Extension
- Institute of Microbiology
- Institute of Pharmaceutical Sciences
- Internationally Accredited University Diagnostic Lab (over ISO 17025)
- Internationally Accredited Quality Operations Lab (over ISO 17025)
- Central Laboratory Complex (C.L.C.)
- Bioequivalence Study Center
- Pet Center
- Information Technology center
- Business Incubation Center

== Undergraduate degree programs ==
=== (Undergraduate Degrees at City Campus) ===
- Doctor of Veterinary Medicine (DVM) (5 Year)(City/Ravi Campus)
- Doctor of Pharmacy (Pharm-D) (5 Year)
- BS (Hons.) Applied Microbiology
- BS (Hons.) Nutrition & Dietetics
- BS (Hons.) Biotechnology
- BS (Hons.) Biochemistry
- BS (Hons.) Environmental Sciences
- BS (Hons.) Medical lab technology
- BS (Hons.) Biological Sciences
- BS (Hons.) Food Science and Technology
- BBA (Hons)

=== Undergraduate Degrees at Ravi Campus ===
- BS (Hons.) Biological Sciences
- BS (Hons.) Botany
- BS (Hons.) Dairy Technology
- BS (Hons.) Fisheries and Aquaculture
- BS (Hons.) Medical Lab Technology
- BS (Hons.) Poultry Science
- BS (Hons.) Zoology

== Master level degree programs ==
- MBA (Executive)(Evening) (2 Year)
- MBA Life Sciences (3.5 Year)
- MBA Banking & Finance (3.5 Year)
- M.Sc Zoology (2 Year)
- M.Sc Biochemistry (2 Year)
- M.Sc Biological Sciences (2 Year)

The following Postgraduate degree programs (M.Phil & Ph.D) are offered in different disciplines. The number of students has increased from 650 in 2003 to 4000 in 2011.

== M.Phil. ==
- Botany
- Microbiology
- Pathology
- Parasitology
- Theriogenology
- Clinical Medicine and Surgery (Medicine)
- Clinical Medicine and Surgery (Surgery)
- Epidemiology and Public Health
- Food and Nutrition (Animal Nutrition)
- Food and Nutrition (Human Nutrition)
- Poultry Production
- Livestock Production (Animal Breeding and Genetics)
- Livestock Production (Livestock Management)
- Dairy Technology
- Pharmacology
- Physiology
- Anatomy and Histology
- Wildlife and Ecology
- Fisheries and Aquaculture
- Molecular Biology and Biotechnology
- Biochemistry
- Forensic Sciences
- Bioinformatics
- Pharmaceutical Sciences
- Zoology
- One Health

== Ph.D. ==
- Botany
- Microbiology
- Pathology
- Parasitology
- Theriogenology
- Clinical Medicine and Surgery (Medicine)
- Epidemiology and Public Health
- Food and Nutrition (Animal Nutrition)
- Food and Nutrition (Human Nutrition)
- Poultry Production
- Livestock Production (Animal Breeding and Genetics)
- Livestock Production (Livestock Management)
- Dairy Technology
- Pharmacology
- Physiology
- Anatomy and Histology
- Wildlife and Ecology
- Fisheries and Aquaculture
- Molecular Biology and Biotechnology
- Biochemistry
- Bioinformatics
- Zoology

=== Institute of Continuing Education and Extension ===
The Institute of Continuing Education and Extension that was established in July 2002 with the main objective to uplift the rural farming community and contribute to national economic development. To achieve the goal, the institute has been offering diploma/certificate courses and vocational educational programs in livestock, poultry, dairy, fisheries, wildlife, etc. The subject specialists of this institute are also providing extension services to farmers at their doorsteps. This institute has trained thousands of farmers, para-vets and veterinarians in different disciplines of livestock production and management.

== Diploma courses ==
1. Livestock Assistant Diploma
2. Poultry Assistant Diploma
3. Dairy Herd Supervisor Diploma
4. Training of Community Livestock Extension Workers

== Sub-campuses ==
1. College of Veterinary and Animal Sciences, Jhang
2. University of Veterinary and Animal Sciences (Ravi Campus)
3. Cholistan University of Veterinary and Animal Sciences, Bahawalpur
4. Khan Bahadar Choudhry Mushtaq Ahmed College of Veterinary and Animal Sciences, Narowal
5. Para-Veterinary Institute, Karor Lal-Eason Layyah

== See also ==
- Pakistan Veterinary Medical Council
- Fisheries Research and Training Institute, Lahore
- Cholistan University of Veterinary and Animal Sciences, Bahawalpur
- College of Veterinary and Animal Sciences, Jhang
