= University of Veterinary and Animal Sciences (Ravi Campus) =

University in Pattoki, Pakistan

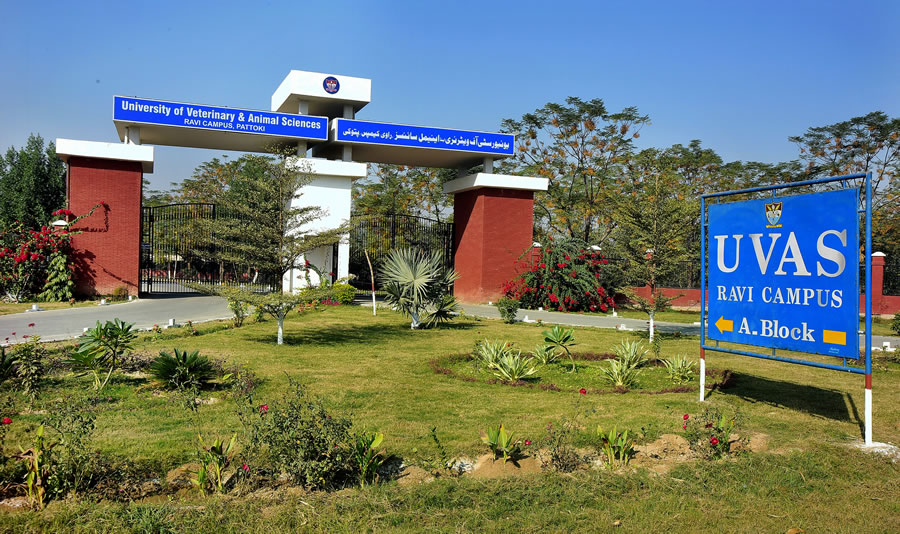
- Type: Public
- Established: 2002
- Affiliations: University of Veterinary and Animal Sciences Higher Education Commission (Pakistan) Pakistan Veterinary Medical Council
- Chancellor: Governor of the Punjab
- Vice-Chancellor: Prof. Dr. Muhammad Younus Rana
- Registrar: Sajjad Haider
- Students: ~7000+
- Location: Pattoki, Punjab, Pakistan
- Campus: Urban
- Colours: Crimson, White, RYB
- Nickname: UVAS RC
- Website: uvas.edu.pk

The University of Veterinary and Animal Sciences (Ravi Campus) (initials:UVAS Ravi Campus), is a government university located in Pattoki, Punjab, Pakistan.

== Accreditation ==
It is accredited by the Pakistan Veterinary Medical Council (PVMC).

In June 2002, on the college of veterinary sciences being upgraded to a university, the Punjab Government allotted about 1,000 acres at Pattoki for the establishment of the sub campus for the education and research work activities, named the Ravi Campus, Pattoki.

The university generates significant economic growth and business opportunities in Pakistan, as many recommendations by the university's think tanks are adopted by the government. The university's own program is focused towards building efforts on poverty reduction, prosperity, livestock production and building a generation of trained manpower in the country.

== See also ==
- Pakistan Veterinary Medical Council
- Fisheries Research and Training Institute, Lahore
- Cholistan University of Veterinary and Animal Sciences, Bahawalpur
