= College of Veterinary and Animal Sciences, Jhang =

College in Jhang, Punjab, Pakistan

Coordinates: 31.3487°N 72.3733°E

College of Veterinary and Animal Sciences
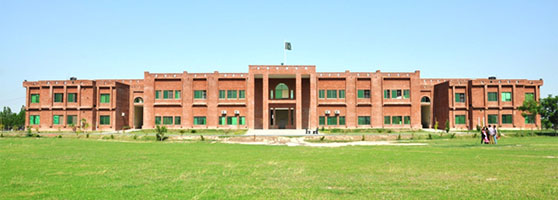
- Other names: CVAS
- Type: Public
- Established: 2006
- Accreditation: Pakistan Veterinary Medical Council
- Academic affiliations: University of Veterinary and Animal Sciences
- Principal: Muhammad Fiaz Qamar
- Students: 1000
- Location: Jhang, Punjab, Pakistan
- Website: uvas.edu.pk/other_campuses/CVAS/

College of Veterinary and Animal Sciences (CVAS) is a sub-campus of University of Veterinary and Animal Sciences, Lahore located at Jhang, Punjab, Pakistan.

The college was established in 2006 as an initiative for veterinary education under special consideration of Lt. Gen. (Rtd.) Khalid Maqbool (then Governor of the Punjab and Chancellor, University of Veterinary and Animal Sciences Lahore). The founder Principal of the college was Prof. Dr. Ashiq Hussain Cheema, who was a renowned Veterinary Pathologist. The current principal is Prof. Dr. Muhammad Fiaz Qamar.

The college comprises five major departments offering a five-year DVM degree program. The new campus of CVAS, scattered over 100 acres (0.40 km^{2}) in two blocks, Academics Block and Clinical Veterinary Hospital at a site located 12 km Chiniot Road, Jhang near Chenab College, Jhang. The academic, research and supporting services blocks, dairy and poultry farms, processing units for milk, meat and feed, Clinical Centrum for all species, libraries, auditorium, sports facilities and residences are all under development.

== Recognition ==
The Degree programs are accredited by the Pakistan Veterinary Medical Council (PVMC). Students from this campus participate in world veterinary day.

== Departments ==
- Department of Pathobiology (Pathology, Microbiology and Parasitology)
- Department of Basic Sciences (Anatomy & Histology, Physiology & Biochemistry and Pharmacology & Toxicology)
- Department of Animal Sciences (Livestock Production, Poultry Production, Animal Nutrition, Animal Breeding & Genetics)
- Department of Clinical Sciences (Veterinary Medicine, Veterinary Surgery, Theriogenology and Epidemiology & Public Health)
- Department of Social Sciences (Computer Science, Math & Statistics, Islamic Studies, Pakistan Studies, Economics, English and Continuing Education & Extension)

The college offers 5-year Doctor of Veterinary Medicine (DVM) and 4-year BS Honors programs in Applied Microbiology and Poultry Sciences. Postgraduate programs are offered in 10 disciplines.

== See also ==
- Pakistan Veterinary Medical Council
- University of Veterinary and Animal Sciences, Lahore
- Cholistan University of Veterinary and Animal Sciences, Bahawalpur
