= Bhoe Asal railway station =

Railway station in Punjab, Pakistan

Bhoe Asal Railway Station بھوئے آصل ریلوے اسٹیشن

General information
- Coordinates: 31.1286°N 74.0330°E
- Owner: Ministry of Railways
- Line: Karachi–Peshawar Railway Line

Other information
- Status: Closed
- Station code: BOC

Services
Preceding station	Pakistan Railways	Following station
Changa Manga towards Kiamari	Karachi–Peshawar Line	Kot Radha Kishn towards Peshawar Cantonment
Location

Bhoe Asal Railway Station (Urdu and Punjabi: بھوئے آصل ریلوے اسٹیشن) is located in Bhoe Asal village, in Kasur district of Pakistan's Punjab province.

== See also ==
- List of railway stations in Pakistan
- Pakistan Railways
