= Montagu William Douglas =

British soldier and colonial administrator

- Douglas in 1939
- Born: 1863
- Died: 1957 (aged 93–94)
- Occupations: Soldier; Judicial officer; Writer
- Years active: 1884–1954
- Notable work: ''The Earl of Oxford as "Shakespeare"; an outline of the case Lord Oxford and the Shakespeare Group

Signature
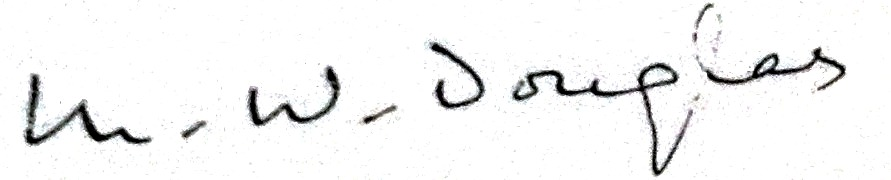

Montagu William Douglas CSI, CIE. (1863 – February 1957) was a British soldier and colonial administrator in India. As the assistant district commissioner in the Punjab, he investigated the attempted murder allegation made by Henry Martyn Clark against Mirza Ghulam Ahmad, the founder of the Ahmadiyya movement. Ahmad later declared him to be the "Pilate of our time", superior to the original.

In his later life he was a noted advocate of the Oxfordian theory of Shakespeare authorship and was president of the Shakespeare Fellowship for many years.

== Early life and career ==
He was born to Edward Douglas, (1831–1867) and Annie Arbuthnot, (born 1831). In February 1884 he joined the 1st Battalion, North Staffordshire Regiment, switching to the Indian army in 1887. He was promoted to captain in 1895.

In 1891, Douglas married Helen Mary Isabelle Downer (born 1863). They had three children, Edward Montagu Douglas (born 1891), Major Archibald Stair Montagu Douglas, MM, (1897–1974), and Helen Elizabeth Douglas (born 1893).

== Investigation of attempted murder claims ==
In 1897, having been appointed assistant district commissioner in the Punjab, Douglas was required to investigate the allegations of Henry Martyn Clark against Mirza Ghulam Ahmad. Clark, a Christian missionary, had been approached by a youth named Abdul Hamid, who claimed that Ahmad had sent him to kill Clark. Douglas found Hamid's claims to be implausible, and that there was evidence that Hamid had been coached. He had also repeatedly changed and even retracted his story. Douglas dismissed the charges. Even after more than forty years he vividly remembered the case and its details. He wrote to J. D. Shams, an Ahmadiyya missionary in London on 29 July 1939, "... the evidence was false and thus I acquitted Mirza Ghulam Ahmad". The aftermath was presented by Ahmad's supporters as a triumph, and as evidence of Ahmad's divine mission. Subsequently, Ahmad compared Douglas favourably with Pontius Pilate, declaring him to be a man of much superior character, stating,

In my opinion, Captain Douglas outshines Pilate in imparting judgment fearlessly and in showing determination and steadfastness ... Pilate showed cowardice due to fear of the High Priest and the Elders, and acted in a cowardly manner. But Captain Douglas showed no sign of weakness ... Those who are blessed with honour from above do not hanker after worldly honours. This commendable courtesy by the 'Pilate' of our time shall be remembered by all my followers when I am gone. He shall be remembered till the end of the world with love and respect."

In his book Kitab ul Baryyah (An Account of Exoneration) Mirza Ghulam Ahmad has narrated the details of the case.

== Later career and retirement ==
Douglas was appointed deputy commissioner in 1899, and was promoted to major on 6 February 1902. He was on the executive committee for the Coronation Durbar at Delhi in 1903. From 1910 to 1913 he was deputy commissioner of the Lylpur District. He then served as chief commissioner of the Andaman and Nicobar Islands from 1913 to 1920.

Douglas was honoured as Companion of the Order of the Indian Empire (CIE) in 1903 and as Companion of the Order of the Star of India (CSI) in 1919.

In his retirement he was an advocate of Oxfordian theory of Shakespeare authorship and wrote The Earl of Oxford as “Shakespeare”; an outline of the case (1931). In 1928 he became president of The Shakespeare Fellowship, after the death of its founder George Greenwood. He held the post until 1945. Douglas advocated a "group theory" of Shakespeare authorship with Oxford as the "master mind". In Lord Oxford and the Shakespeare Group (1952) he expanded his theory, asserting that Oxford's fellow-contributors were Francis Bacon, Christopher Marlowe, the Earl of Derby, John Lyly and Robert Greene. According to James S. Shapiro Douglas also believed that "Queen Elizabeth had entrusted Oxford to oversee a propaganda department that would produce patriotic plays and pamphlets".

In his later life he also painted and was among amateurs exhibited at the Royal Academy.
