= Shaikham =

Pakistani village

- Village
- Location within Pakistan
- Coordinates: 31°3′50″N 73°48′43″E
- Country: Pakistan
- Province: Punjab
- District: Kasur
- Time zone: UTC+5 (PST)

Shaikham, a village in Punjab, Pakistan, is also known as Shaikham Kalan to differentiate it from Shaikham Khurd, located to the northeast. It lies within the Pattoki Tehsil of Kasur District.

== Nearest cities ==
- Raiwind 42 km,
- Okara 45 km,
- Jaranwala City 53 km,
- Kasur 58 km,
- Junubi Lahore (South Lahore) 60 km,
- Lahore 70 km,
- Shaikhupura 77 km,
- Shumali Lahore (North Lahore) 77 km,
- Mashriqi Lahore (East Lahore) 80 km,
- Muridke 93 km,
