= St. John's Church, Peshawar =

Cathedral Church of St. John
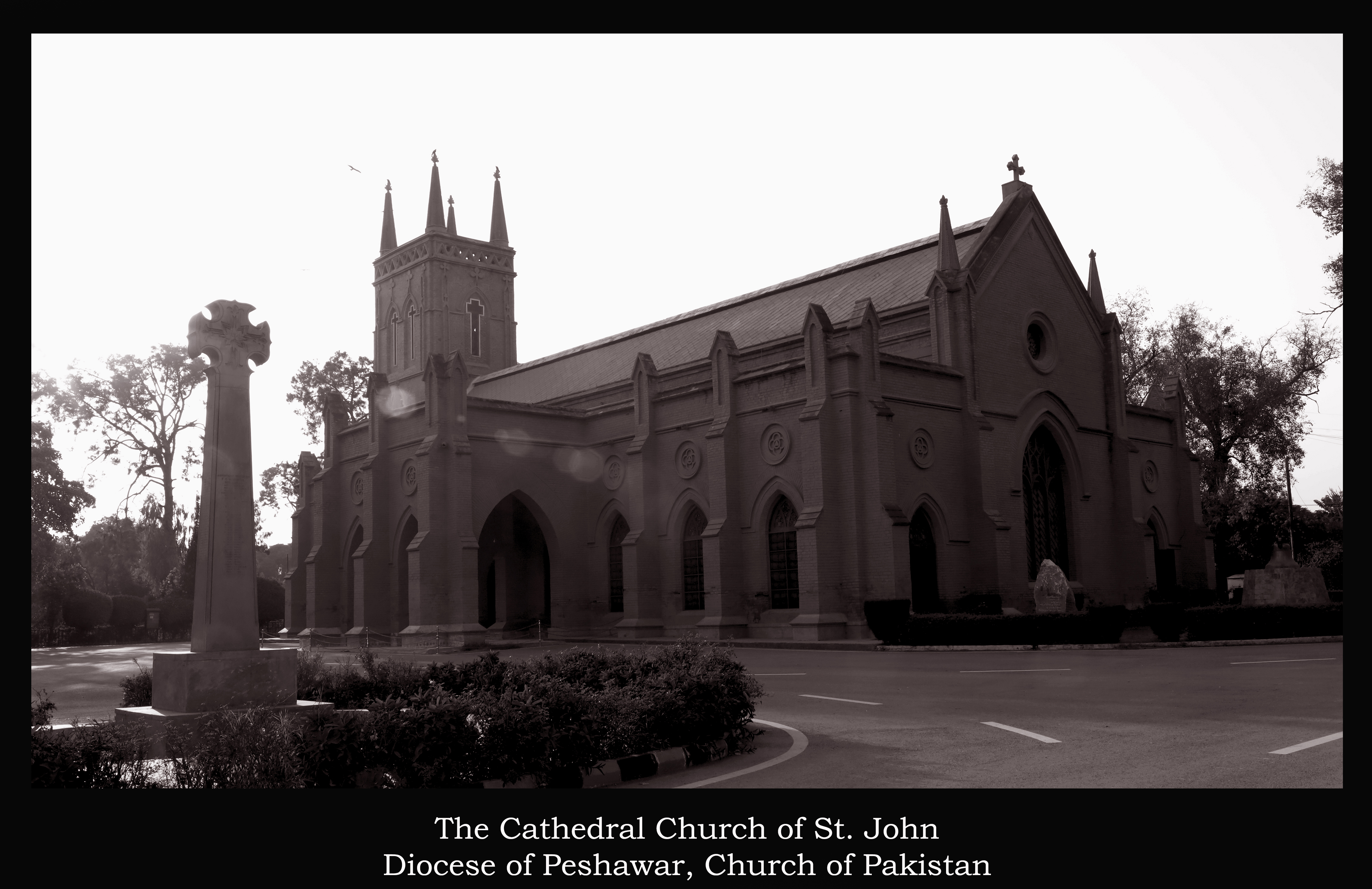
- Cathedral Church of St. John
- 33°59′56″N 71°31′51″E
- Location: Peshawar, Pakistan

St. John's Cathedral is an Anglican church located in the Cantonment area of Peshawar, Pakistan, adjacent to the Peshawar Garrison Services Club. It serves as the seat of the Diocese of Peshawar within the Church of Pakistan and is the oldest and largest church in the region.

== History ==
Following the British defeat of the Sikh Empire and the annexation of Peshawar in 1849, Christian services were initially held in a temporary structure known as Morton Chapel in Peepal Mandi, as well as in outdoor locations at Company Bagh. Efforts to establish a permanent garrison church were led by Dr. Kemp, a founder of the Peshawar Mission. The foundation stone was laid on March 23, 1851 by Archdeacon Pratt, the Bishop of Calcutta. Soon, Frederick Mackeson became the first Chief Commissioner of Peshawar and he suspended the construction due to military security concerns. He also sought to prevent Robert Clarke, the Bishop of Amritsar, from entering the city. Despite these restrictions, Clarke reached Peshawar in 1852, after crossing the Indus River at Attock Khurd. Following Mackeson's assassination, his successor, Sir Herbert Edwardes, and a close associate of Clarke, lifted the suspension on Clarke's request. The church was completed in 1860 at a cost of 11,000 British Indian rupees and was formally consecrated by Bishop Cotton of Calcutta.

During its centenary in 1960, the church was renovated. Prince Philip, Duke of Edinburgh visited the church in 1961, and returned in 1962 with Queen Elizabeth II to attend a service. A second major renovation, was carried out in the early 2000s at a cost of approximately Rs 5 million.

In 1981, the Diocese of Peshawar was founded to cover the Frontier and Northern areas, and St. John's was elevated to the status of a Cathedral in 1982.

== Architecture ==
The cathedral is a rectangular edifice built using a combination of clay, mud, bricks, and lime. Its architecture features tall spires. The building is accessed through three primary entrances on the southern, northern, and eastern sides, along with a smaller secondary entrance on the western side.

== Notable burials ==
The bodies of some British officers who were killed in action while fighting on the frontier, including that of Lieutenant Colonel James O'Bryen, were buried here.
