= Dina Nath =

Dina Nath or Dinanath is an Indian name. It may refer to:

- Dina Nath Bhagat
- Dina Nath Malhotra
- Dina Nath Walli
- Dina Nath Sharma
- Diwan Dina Nath
- Dinanath Nadim
- Dinanath Batra
- Dinanath Dalal
- Dinanath Gopal Tendulkar
- Dinanath Singh Yadav
- Dinanath Ramnarine
- Dinanath Pathy
- Dinanath Bhaskar
- Dinanath Kushwaha
- Dinanath Mishra
- Dinanath Sen
- Dinanath Atmaram Dalvi
- Dinanath Bhargava
