= Thomas Henry Fitzpatrick =

Thomas Henry Fitzpatrick (died 1866) was, along with Robert Clark, one of the first two British Church Missionary Society (CMS) missionaries to the Punjab.

== Biography ==
He was educated in Law at Gray's Inn, but was converted to Christ when about to be called to the bar. He took a theological degree from Trinity College, Dublin, and became Curate at Bishop Ryder Church, Birmingham. When the Punjab was opened for CMS Mission activities, he was sent as CMS missionary with Robert Clark to begin a mission in Punjab.

He married Anna Longridge Gooch, first wife, on 14 April 1851. On 1 July 1851, he sailed along with his wife and Robert Clark to India, and reached Kolkata(present Calcutta) on 13 October 1851. They moved from Calcutta to Punjab and were involved in missionary activities, including printing dictionaries, grammars, and starting schools. A first CMS mission station was founded in Amritsar in 1952—the foundation-stone of a church was laid on 24 May 1952.

He shuttled between Punjab, Lahore, Multan, and Peshawar as part of CMS missionary activities; he transferred himself to Multan station and later to Lahore in 1856. His first wife Anna Longridge Gooch, having suffered from severe health problems, was compelled to return home in 1861. She died on 18 February 1863.

Fitzpatrick returned to Punjab in the end of the year 1863; he was compelled to return England with prostrating illness in 1864. While in England, he served as Curate for a few months at St Mary's Chapel, Brighton. In September 1865, he became Vicar of Dalston in Cumbria, and married his second wife Anne Barton; however, he held the post for only a few months, and died on 11 February 1866 at Dalston.
