= Sahjowal =

Sehjowal Chak No.11 Village Of Plants And Flowers
- Town
- Location in Pakistan
- Coordinates: 30.967785°N 73.787262°E
- Chunia: [Chunia]]
- Province: Punjab
- District: Kasur
- Tehsil: Pattoki
- Established: 1890
- Founder: Allah

Government
  - Chairman: Muhammad Arshad Javed Ch (PTI)

Population (http://www.google.com.pk/maps/vt/data=Ay5GWBeob_WIPLDYoIWcfVXxvZu9XwJ55OX7Ag,2JQwj5x5yCdN3XxoJgEOAUKV3XmcsNuF7rYMvV51WhkPUxlhoQezS1AhCaq92FjsXDIMFgy7qii0_WT71BGBYzxHDBwiK9ziI9UeuHUN8vUNW_YDouZ_b4nsfSJeitZgxwkMAAhVNdEUVV3eb8h04mEjFVUf_crobT8OaMutitFdruVn)10,000( Almost )
  - Total: 10,000−15,000
- Time zone: UTC+5 (PST)
- 52000: 52000

Sehjowal Chak No 11 (also Sehjowāl) is a village in Kasur District, Tehsil Pattoki, in the province of Punjab, Pakistan.

== Personalities ==
01) Peer Syed Asghar Ali Shah (Late) 02) Peer Syed Bilal Shah 03) Muhammad Arshad Javed Chaudhry 04) Mian Muhammad Shareef Sahib 05 Chaudhry Sadiq Nasir(Late) 06) Lala Haji Muhammad Tufail

== Schools ==
Gvt High School For Boys Gvt High School For Girls Gvt Elimentry School For Girls Nadeem Haider Model Midle School Iqra Model School

== Festivels ==
Eid Milladun NAbi (SAW) Eid Ul Azha Eid Ul Fitter Mela Jammat (Peer Hazrat Daud Bandgi Karmani RA Held On (12 Mar) Every Year Mela Peer Shair Muhammad RA Held On (18 Oct) Every Year Mehfil E Naat For Dua e Maghfarat Of Peer Syed Asghar Ali Shah (Late)
