= Alpa Kalan =

- Town
- Location within Pakistan
- Coordinates: 30°56′56″N 73°44′36″E
- Country: Pakistan
- Province: Punjab
- District: Kasur
- Time zone: UTC+5 (PST)

Alpa Kalan is a town and Union Council of the Kasur District in the Punjab province of Pakistan. It is part of Pattoki Tehsil and is located at 31°8'16N 73°40'3E with an altitude of 182 metres (600 feet).
