= Changa Manga railway station =

Railway station in Punjab, Pakistan

Changa Manga railway station چھانگا مانگا ریلوے اسٹیشن
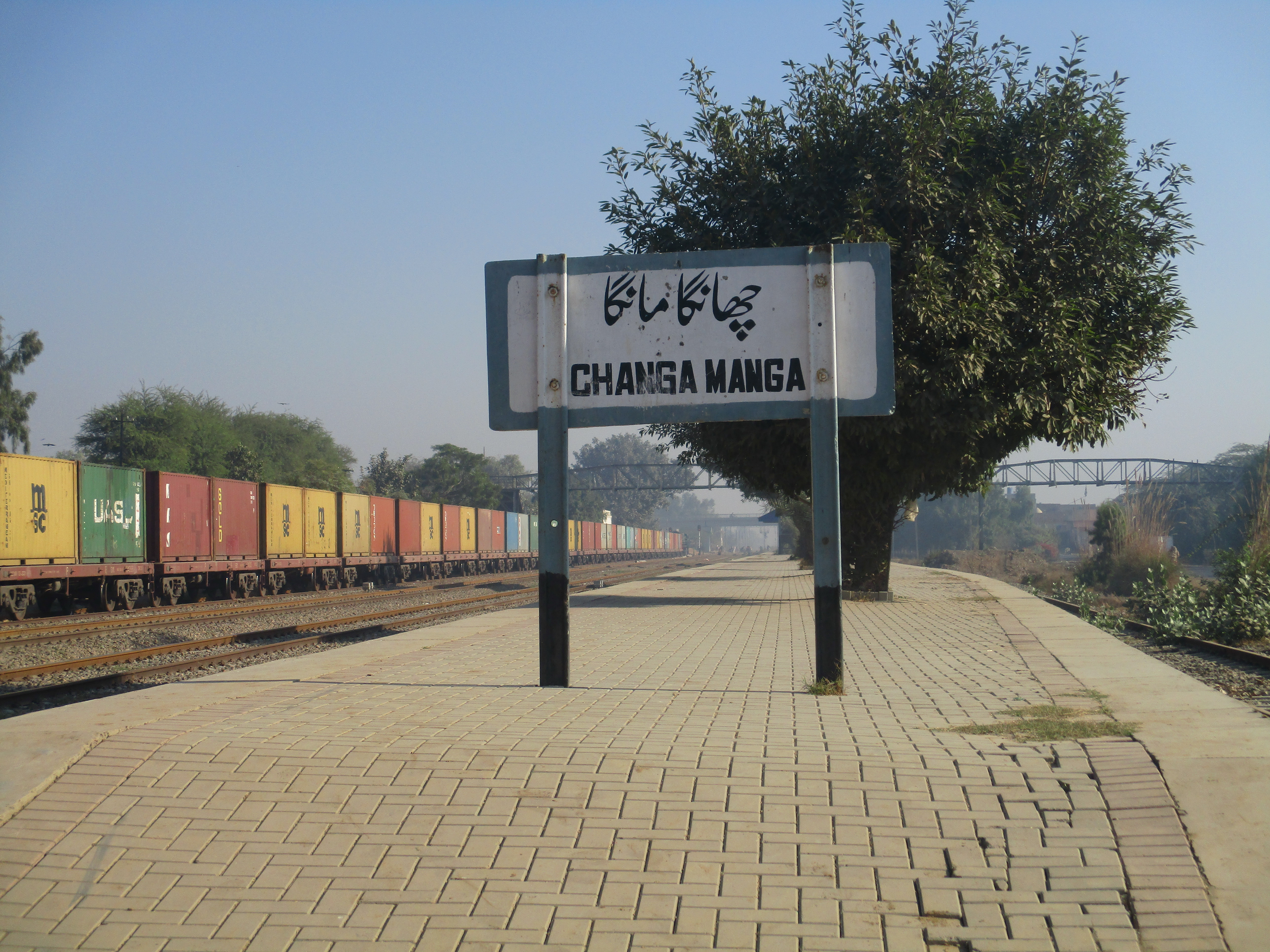
- Changa Manga railway station

General information
- Coordinates: 31.0849°N 73.9641°E
- Owner: Ministry of Railways
- Line: Karachi–Peshawar Railway Line

Other information
- Station code: CGM

Services
Preceding station	Pakistan Railways	Following station
Pattoki towards Kiamari	Karachi–Peshawar Line	Bhoe Asal towards Peshawar Cantonment
Location

Changa Manga Railway Station (Urdu and Punjabi: چھانگا مانگا ریلوے اسٹیشن) is located in Changa Manga town, in Kasur district of Pakistan's Punjab province.

In May 2025, Changa Manga was reported to be among 14 stations of Pakistan Railways' Lahore Railway Division being converted to solar energy.

== See also ==
- List of railway stations in Pakistan
- Pakistan Railways
