= Prem Nagar railway station =

Railway station in Punjab, Pakistan

Prem Nagar Railway Station پریم نگر ریلوے اسٹیشن

General information
- Coordinates: 31.2077°N 74.1579°E
- Owner: Ministry of Railways
- Line: Karachi–Peshawar Railway Line

Other information
- Station code: PNX

Services
Preceding station	Pakistan Railways	Following station
Kot Radha Kishn towards Kiamari	Karachi–Peshawar Line	Raiwind Junction towards Peshawar Cantonment
Location

Prem Nagar Railway Station (Urdu and Punjabi: پریم نگر ریلوے اسٹیشن) is located in Prem Nagar village, Kasur district of Pakistan's Punjab province. The railway station also serves the Lahore Dry Port, located adjacent to the station.

== See also ==
- List of railway stations in Pakistan
- Pakistan Railways
