= Henry Martyn Clark =

British physician and missionary

- Born: September 19, 1859; Peshawar, Pakistan
- Died: April 10, 1916 (aged 56); Edinburgh, Scotland
- Citizenship: United Kingdom
- Education: University of Edinburgh, MB and CM 1881, MD 1892
- Occupations: Medical missionary and pamphleteer
- Employer: Church Missionary Society

Henry Martyn Clark (September 19, 1859 – April 10, 1916) was an Afghan-born adopted British physician, missionary, and writer. He worked for the Church Missionary Society as medical missionary stationed in Amritsar, India.

== Early life ==
Clark was born circa 1857 in Peshawar, Pakistan to Afghan parents. He was adopted after his mother's death by Elizabeth and Rev. Robert Clark in 1859. It is thought that he was named Henry Martyn after the Anglican missionary to Persia and India.

Clark was educated at the University of Edinburgh, receiving an MB, CM in 1881 and receiving a MD in 1892.

== Career ==
In 1881, Clark was accepted by the Church Missionary Society to start the Amritsar Medical Mission as a medical missionary, where he worked with Arthur Colborne Lankester. He left for Amritsar, India, to join his father on 4 February 1882.

In Amritsar, Clark gained a reputation as a Christian debater and pamphleteer on Islam and Hinduism. He participated in a fifteen-day public debate with Mirza Ghulam Ahmad, the founder of the Ahmadiyya movement. This was later published by the Ahmadiyya movement in Urdu as Jang e muqqadas (the Holy War).

On 1 August 1897, Henry Clark filed a lawsuit of attempted murder against Mirza Ghulam Ahmad with Deputy Commissioner Montagu William Douglas in Ludhiana. Clark stated that Ahmad had sent a youth named Abdul Hamid to murder him. A version of events is included in the biography A Life of Ahmad by Fazl Mosque. Based on Douglas's investigation of the youth's testimony, the charges against Ahmad were dropped. In his book Kitab ul Baryyah (An Account of Exoneration), Mirza Ghulam Ahmad narrated the details of the case.

Clark was the editor-in-chief of the Dictionary of the Punjab and wrote a biography of his adoptive father, Robert Clark of The Panjab: Pioneer and Missionary Statesman. He retired to Edinburgh in 1905, where he lectured on tropical diseases.

== Personal life ==
Clark married Mary Emma Ireland in 1892. They had two children: Walter Ireland Foggo Martyn-Clark and Robert Eric Noel Martyn-Clark. Their sons were both born in Amritsar and, like their father, studied medicine atί the University of Edinburgh.

Clark died in Edinburgh, Scotland, on April 10, 1916. He was buried in the Dean Cemetery in Edinburgh. His birth date on the stone is 19 September 1859, and his death date is 10 April 1916. The inscription reads "Physician to both soul and body"
