= Arthur Colborne Lankester =

Arthur Colborne Lankester (1868–1963) worked for the Church Missionary Society (CMS) and took station in Punjab, Peshawar, and Sindh, India before the Indian Parition. He designed and built the Peshawar Mission Hospital. Lankester was a religiously motivated medical missionary who developed more efficient hospital designs that are still in use and also contributed to disease prevention in India. Later he went to work for the government of India as the Tuberculosis Officer as well as the Director of the Medical and Sanitation Department in Hyderabad.

== Early life and education ==
Lankester was born in Leicester, United Kingdom, the child of Henry Lankester and Rachel Crosby Squire. His father was a surgeon and educational missionary. Arthur Lankester married Alice Grace Fox in 1899, and they had two sons (Chistopher and Stephen) one daughter (Dorothea).

At age 22, Lankester earned Membership of the Royal Colleges of Surgeons and became a Licentiate of the Royal College of Physicians from the St. Thomas Hospital. One year later, he earned his Bachelor of Medicine degree from the University of London in 1891. During his time at the University of London, Lankester developed an interest in doing medical work abroad. Following this, he became a house surgeon at the St. Thomas Hospital until October 8, 1891, when he began missionary work in Punjab.

== Career ==
Lankester operated within the Amritsar Medical Mission. Originally, this mission launched schools and aimed to evangelize residents in Punjab. However, Lankester transformed it into a medically focused mission in 1898 after the first patient arrived at the mission from 200 miles away and requested treatment.

Lankester aimed to spread the gospel while performing his medical duties, treating conditions such as cataracts and general sickness. The Indian government also tasked him with mitigating tuberculosis.

Lankester designed and managed the construction of the new Peshawar hospital in 1904, now known as the Peshawar Mission Hospital. It had two in-patient sections of the building, the second of which was called the "James Serai." It was modeled of the local courtyards called "Serai". There, patients could stay with their family and friends. Lankester brought this idea over from British hospitals and spread it to the South Asian medical system. This was one of the first large-scale implementations of what later became known as the Serai System.

Lankester left the mission hospital to work for the government in May 1914. He became an Officer for tuberculosis for the government of India and the Director of the Medical and Sanitation Department in Hyderabad.

Lankester spoke about the Serai System at the 1912 Medical Mission Auxiliary. Building on his speech in 1905, where he also mentioned the System, he demonstrated why the System was needed in the North West frontier. After other missionary groups saw the success of Lankester's hospital, the Serai System began to spread worldwide. The Mengo hospital in Uganda adopted the Serai System and was subsequently able to treat more patients. Other African regions copied this style as well, with the Gierku mission building West African hospitals with space for family and belongings.

Lankester worked closely with fellow missionary Henry Martyn Clark. Clark focused primarily on the spread and treatment of malaria. Lankester studied insects and their ability to spread disease along with Clark. This research contributed to the finding that female mosquitos spread malaria through biting.

=== Publications ===
- Tuberculosis in India, Arthur Lankester MD, (317 pgs) Butterworth and Co., Calcutta/Winnepeg/Sydney/London, 1920
