= Kot Radha Kishan Tehsil =

Kot Radha Kishan Tehsil تحصیل کوٹ رادھا کشن
- Tehsil
- Location in Pakistan Kot Radha Kishan Tehsil (Pakistan)
- Country: Pakistan
- Province: (Punjab, Pakistan) Punjab
- District: Kasur
- Capital: Kot Radha Kishan

Area
  - Tehsil: 398 km^{2} (154 sq mi)

Population (2023)
  - Tehsil: 424,875
  - Density: 1,070/km^{2} (2,760/sq mi)
  - Urban: 102,057 (24.02%)
  - Rural: 322,818 (75.98%)
- Time zone: UTC+5 (PST)
  - Summer (DST): UTC+6 (PDT)

Kot Radha Kishan (Punjabi, Urdu: تحصیل کوٹ رادھا کشن) is a tehsil located in Kasur District of Punjab, Pakistan. The city of Kot Radha Kishan serves as the administrative headquarter of the tehsil. The tehsil's population was 360,330, according to the 2017 census.

== Demographics ==
Historical population
Year	Pop.	±% p.a.
1951	...	—
1961	...	—
1972	...	—
1981	...	—
1998	...	—
2017	360,523	—
2023	424,875	+2.78%

According to the 2023 census, Kot Radha Kishan Tehsil had a population of 424,875.

== See also ==
- Kot Radha Kishan railway station
