= Baghiana Kalan =

- Town
- Location within Pakistan
- Coordinates: 30°56′56″N 73°44′36″E
- Country: Pakistan
- Province: Punjab
- District: Kasur
- Time zone: UTC+5 (PST)

Baghiana Kalan (Urdu: بگهيانہ كلاں) is a village and Union Council near Phoolnagar in Pattoki Tehsil, Kasur District in the Punjab province of Pakistan. It is part of Pattoki Tehsil, and was the location in 2004 of a speech by Khurshid Mahmud Kasuri, the former Foreign minister of Pakistan, about the India-Pakistan peace process.
