= Bhoe Asal =

- Town
- Location within Pakistan
- Coordinates: 30°56′56″N 73°44′36″E
- Country: Pakistan
- Province: Punjab
- District: Kasur
- Time zone: UTC+5 (PST)

Bhoe Asal (Urdu: بهوۓ آصل), is a town and Union Council of Kasur District in the Punjab province of Pakistan. It is on the Lahore-Karachi railway track and on Pattoki-Raiwind Road. The town is close to Changa Manga, Pakistan's biggest planted forest. Bhoe Asal railway station here takes its name from the town, which is situated between Kot Radha Kishan and Changa Manga.
