= Bhopay Wal =

Pakistani village

- Village
- Location within Pakistan
- Coordinates: 30°56′56″N 73°44′36″E
- Country: Pakistan
- Province: Punjab
- District: Kasur
- Time zone: UTC+5 (PST)

Bhopay Wal (chak 23) is a village in Pakistan's Punjab province. Bhopay Wal is the centre of its union council, has about 520 households with a population of about 3,500. The village is situated in the southwest of Pattoki Tehsil and is part of the Kasur District.

== Demographics ==
The population of the village according to 2017 census was 1,125.
