= Kot Radha Kishan =

Kot Radha Kishan كوٹ رادها كِشن
- City
- location in pakistan Kot Radha Kishan (Pakistan)
- Coordinates: 31.17052°N 74.10099°E
- Country: Pakistan
- Province: (Punjab, Pakistan) Punjab
- District: Kasur
- Tehsil: Kot Radha Kishan

Government
  - Type: Municipal Committee
  - Chairman: Vacant
- Elevation: 216 m (709 ft)

Population (2023 census)
  - City: 102,057
  - Rank: 125th in Pakistan
- Time zone: UTC+5 (PST)
- Number of Union councils: 6

Kot Radha Kishan (Punjabi, Urdu: کوٹ رادھا کشن) is a city in Kasur District in the Punjab province of Pakistan. The city is administratively subdivided into four Union councils. It was formerly part of Kasur Tehsil and has now been upgraded to a tehsil of Kasur district due to the growing population of the area. It is located at 31°10'21N 74°5'59E at an altitude of 193 metres. Kot Radha Kishan is also called 'City of Containers and Leather'.

== Demographics ==
=== Population ===
Historical population
Year	Pop.	±% p.a.
1951	8,657	—
1961	10,536	+1.98%
1972	14,468	+2.93%
1981	24,969	+6.25%
1998	39,555	+2.74%
2017	58,894	+2.12%
2023	102,057	+9.60%

The population of Kot Radha Kishan is about 1,55,000 with an annual growth rate of 2.7%, household size 7.4 and literacy rate is about 69%. The population of the surrounding villages of Kot Radha Kishan is more than 162,000 with a literacy rate of about 53%. These surrounding villages rely on Kot Radha Kishan for railway station, bus stand, post offices, banks, colleges, high schools, sub-division courts, and crops and vegetable markets.

Languages

Languages of Kot Radha Kishan MC (2023 Census)
1. Punjabi (81.4%)
2. Mewati (15.0%)
3. Urdu (2.90%)
4. Others (0.70%)

== Living ==
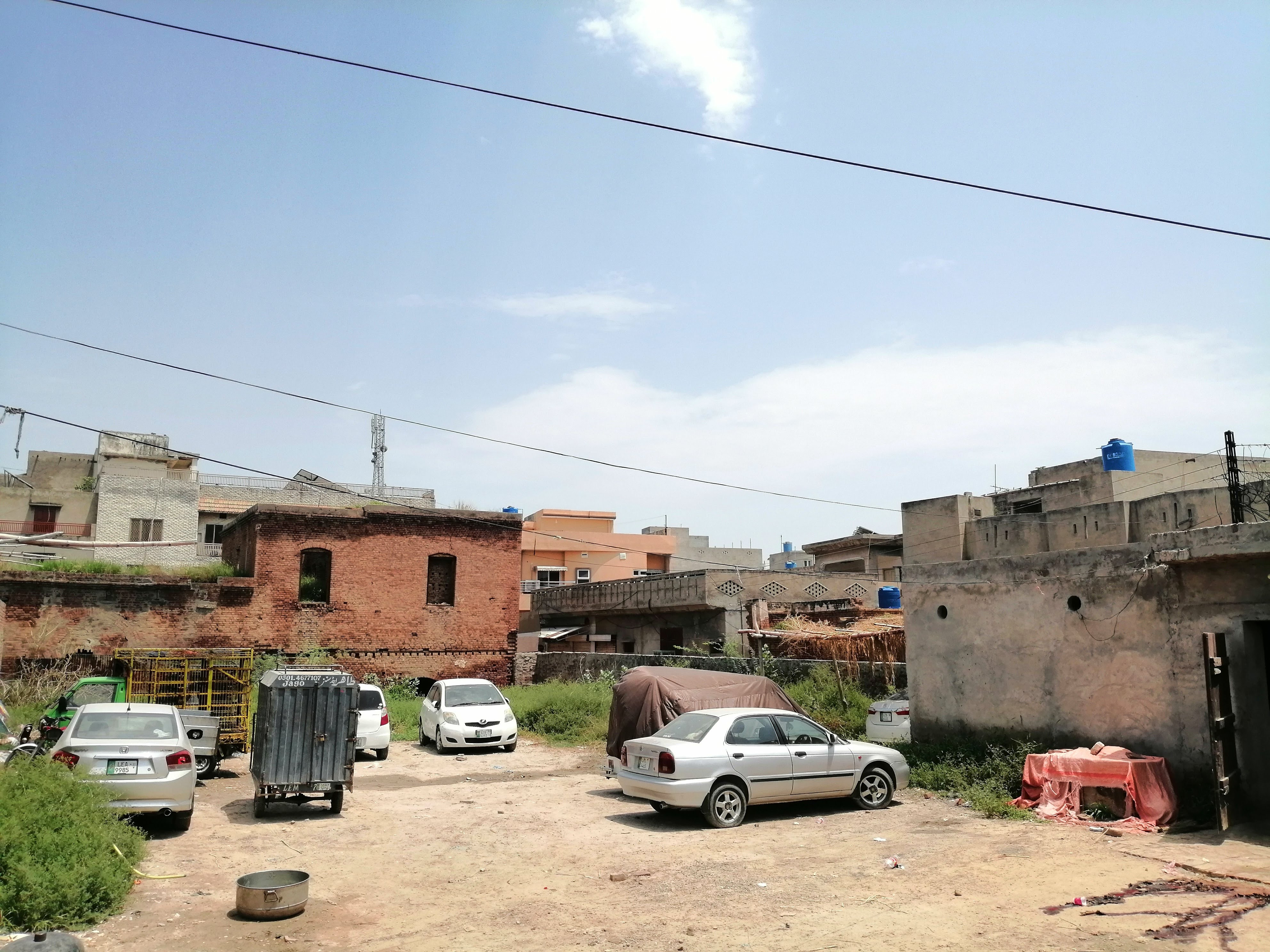
Houses surround a parking lot in the residential area of Kot Radha Kishan.

The educated people of Kot Radha Kishan as well as surrounding villagers are mostly dependent on government as well as private jobs. Illiterate people of the town work as workers in the nearby industrial zone of Raiwind as well as in Lahore. Others from villages depend on agriculture. Small numbers of people have power loom industries in their homes.

Prem Nagar Railway Station, where large railway dry ports by the name of DP World Lahore and MICT are operational, is situated between Raiwand and Kot Radha Kishan.

== Education ==
The public sector has three public high schools for boys and girls, including Govt. High School No. 1 for boys, Govt. High School Kot Sardar Muhammad Khan and a high school for girls. There is also a large number of private schools running in the city. A High School near the village of Pemar Utar has been serving the people for many decades. There are three-degree colleges, two for boys and the other for girls. These colleges provide education for intermediate and degree levels. Recently, a modern library has been built in the degree college for girls.

== See also ==
- Kot Radha Kishan railway station
