= Kot Radha Kishan railway station =

Railway station in Punjab, Pakistan

Kot Radha Kishan Station کوٹ رادھا کشن ریلوے اسٹیشن
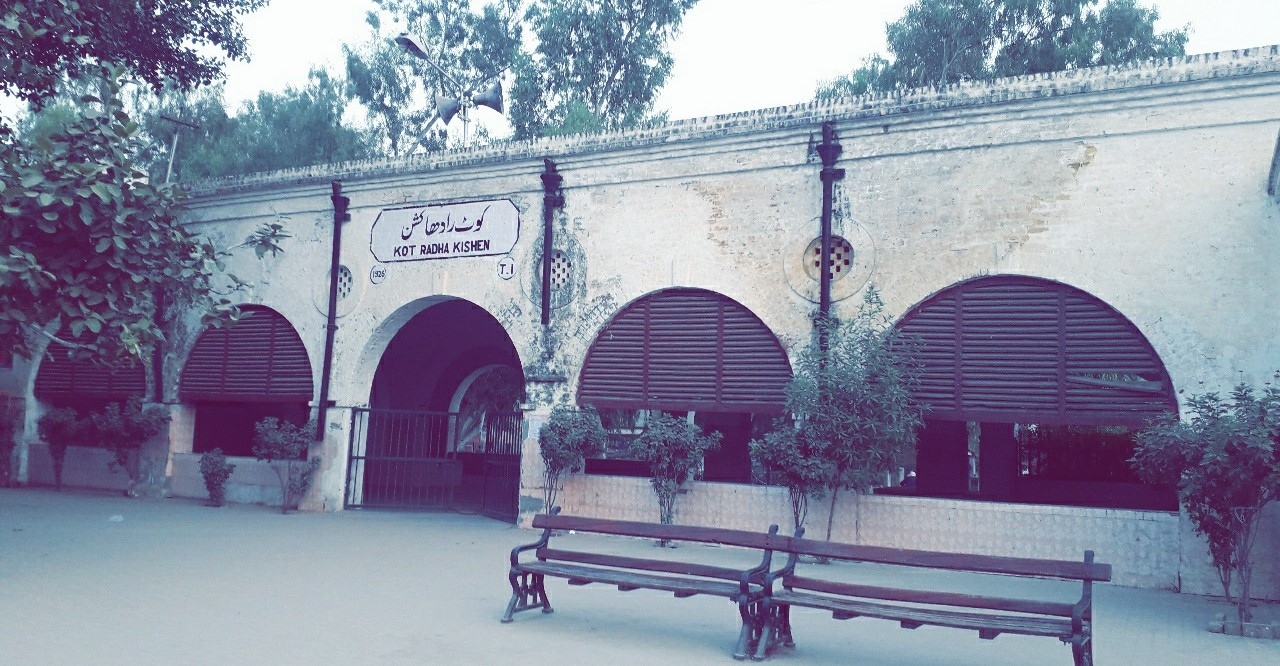

General information
- Coordinates: 31.1696°N 74.0978°E
- Owner: Ministry of Railways
- Line: Karachi–Peshawar Railway Line
- Platforms: 1

Other information
- Station code: KRK

Services
Preceding station	Pakistan Railways	Following station
Bhoe Asal towards Kiamari	Karachi–Peshawar Line	Prem Nagar towards Peshawar Cantonment
Location

Kot Radha Kishan Railway Station (Urdu and Punjabi: کوٹ رادھا کشن ریلوے اسٹیشن) is located in Kot Radha Kishan city, in Kasur district of Pakistan's Punjab province.

In May 2025, Kot Radha Kishan was reported to be among 14 stations of Pakistan Railways' Lahore Railway Division being converted to solar energy.

== See also ==
- List of railway stations in Pakistan
- Pakistan Railways
