= Pattoki railway station =

Railway station in Punjab, Pakistan

Pattoki Railway Station پتوکی ریلوے اسٹیشن

General information
- Coordinates: 31.0191°N 73.8539°E
- Owner: Ministry of Railways
- Line: Karachi–Peshawar Railway Line

Other information
- Station code: PTO

Services
Preceding station	Pakistan Railways	Following station
Habib Abad towards Kiamari	Karachi–Peshawar Line	Changa Manga towards Peshawar Cantonment
Location

Pattoki Railway Station (Urdu and Punjabi: پتوکی ریلوے اسٹیشن) is located in Pattoki city, Kasur district of Punjab province of the Pakistan.

== See also ==
- List of railway stations in Pakistan
- Pakistan Railways
