= Dina Nath Malhotra =

Indian publisher

Dina Nath Malhotra is an Indian publisher whose company Hind Pocket Books developed the paperback market for Hindi books in the 1950s and 1960s. He, with the help and co-operation of some like-minded Delhi-wallas brought the publishing-trade from Bombay to Delhi, shifting the focus away from importers of foreign books to the native publishers. He was instrumental in setting up the first voluntary all-India body of publishers, the Federation of Publishers and Booksellers of India, and served as its president 1967–69. He is president emeritus, Federation of Indian Publishers. Internationally, he was involved with issues of copyright from the perspective of developing countries, and took part in UNESCO expert meetings. He was awarded the Padma Shri by the Government of India in 2000.

Dina Nath Malhotra holds a gold medal in Masters in Academics completed in 1944 at Punjab university Lahore. Due to India - Pakistan separation the gold medal was finally awarded in 2012 at the Pakistan high commission New Delhi.

== Hind Pocket Books Company ==
It is a paperback publisher founded in 1958 by Dina Nath Malhotra. It got the full government support in 60s. It has published most best-quality and bestseller books. Now it is acquired by Penguin Random House's Indian branch situated in Gurgaon and Delhi. Penguin Random House is owned by Bertslemann. Hind Pocket Books has published a variety of Hindi, Urdu and English paperbacks during its work. It is owned by Penguin Random House and in this way, It is reprinting it's old books in a new manner in parenting of Penguin.

=== Reprinting career (2019-present) ===
Many writers' works including Saadat Hasan Manto, Tolstoy, Charles Dickens, Lin Yu Tang and numerous others have been republished by Hind Pocket Books. These works are reprints of the Hind Pocket Books novels that were first published in 1970s,1980s, 1990s and early 2000s. It is also republishing its old works of 80s, 90s and 70s. It has developed various imprints namely Saraswati Trust (legal), Saraswati Vihar, Full Circle Books, Global Management Press, Clarion Books, etc.
