= Robert Clark (missionary) =

British missionary

Robert Clark (1825–1900), and his colleague Thomas Henry Fitzpatrick, were the first English Church Mission Society (CMS) missionaries in the Punjab. Clark was the first missionary to the Afghans, and was the first agent of the Church to enter the city of Leh.

He was the founder of the CMS mission station in Amritsar, the CMS Afghan mission station in Peshawar, and the Kashmir mission – especially Medical missionary work to open a dispensary in Srinagar and Kashmir.

== Early life ==
Clark was born on 4 July at Harmston, Lincolnshire, England. He was reared in an evangelical home, and trained in commerce in Germany. He served with a Liverpool-merchant firm before his call to the ministry in 1844. He was educated at Trinity College. Having decided to prepare for the ministry, he studied at the University of Cambridge; he was amongst the Wranglers of 1850. He was ordained by the CMS and sent to India at the age of twenty-six, when American Presbyterians at Ludhiana urged the CMS to join the work. In 1851 he sailed to Calcutta (present Kolkata), and from there went to Punjab.

== Career ==
=== Punjab (1851–1854) ===
As there were no dictionaries and grammars existing in Punjab when Clark arrived, everything had been made from the beginning to assist in missionary and administrative activities. Accordingly, a school was opened up for Sikhs, Hindus, and Muslims. He founded the first CMS mission station in Amritsar in 1852, and the first preaching of the Gospel was undertaken in the Amritsar bazaar on 20 October 1852.

As an evangelist, he pioneered in Punjab and left an impressive record. His foremost principle was that the evangelism was best carried out by national workers. By 1854, he baptised almost twenty-three, who were soon utilised in the field of evangelism. Accordingly, Amritsar's School founded in 1852, Amristar's College founded in 1862, and Christian Girl's Boarding School did graduate adequate number of qualified Christian workers for that purpose. He knew well, how to train the Pastor's and then to step back while delegating responsibilities to them.

Clark founded the first Christian village in Punjab, and obtained 1,900 acres (760 hectares) of land from the Government. The village was named "Clarkabad" in his honour.

=== Peshawar (1854–1864) ===
In 1854 he founded the CMS Afghan mission, the first European mission to the Afghans, in Peshawar—the doorway to Kabul and Central Asia. To achieve this, he crossed the Indus River, explored Kashmir and Ladakh, and penetrated some way into the Himalayas and western Tibet. At Peshawar, he worked with Karl Gottlieb Pfander, a Basel Mission missionary in Central Asia. He was sent back to England before the outbreak of the Indian Rebellion of 1857 and the Sepoy Mutiny.

While in London, he married Elizabeth Mary Browne, daughter of a Scottish doctor who retired on 14 May 1858 after forty-four years of service in Calcutta. Elizabeth had corresponded with Clark as a "Collector" for the Peshawar mission. She was a linguist with experience in the Sanskrit, Urdu, French, German, and Italian languages. She also worked as a Sister of St. John at the King's College Hospital. Both sailed back to India and joined in Peshawar station in 1858. In Peshawar they adopted an orphan baby Henry Martyn Clark born 1857, adopted 1859, later to study medicine at Edinburgh University and become a medical missionary in Kashmir.

In 1863 at the Punjab missionary conference, Clark advocated the formation of the Punjab Medical Missionary Society. It was subsequently formed at Lahore on 24 January 1864, to work with the Edinburgh Medical Missionary Society, especially in the valley of Kashmir.

=== Kashmir (1864–1868) ===
Accordingly, Clark and his wife ventured into Kashmir and opened a dispensary. Elizabeth started as a doctor, though she was not a qualified doctor as such, only having worked as a Sister before; however, she knew more than the native hakims - Herbalists. Crowds, as many as hundreds of women, who would have died of simple illness, came to consult her, and Clark started his career as a teacher. Clark started the Kashmir mission in 1864. The first attempt at Medical Mission work had met with great opposition.

Elizabeth's success as a doctor in Kashmir provided a "key" to Clark to unlock the minds of natives; subsequently he initiated the movement that resulted in the wide establishment of "Medical missions" throughout India. According to Clark:

Medical Missions are amongst the most important means of evangelising India; and the attention of all Societies should be more distinctly drawn that has hitherto been the case to the opportunities which they afford.

=== England (1868–1876) ===
Clark and his wife returned to England in 1868.

=== Punjab (1876–1900) ===
They both returned to India in 1876, this time landing in Bombay (present Mumbai).

He became the first chairman of the Punjab Native Church council when the "Lahore Diocese" was established in 1877. He also served as the first secretary of the CMS mission between 1878 and 1898. He served as the first secretary of the Church of England Zenana Missionary Society between 1878 and 1900.

Clark died on 16 May 1900 at Kasauli, Himachal Pradesh, at the age of seventy-seven.

== Publications ==
- The missions of the Church Missionary Society and the Church of England Zenana Missionary Society in the Punjab and Sindh, edited and revised and by Robert Maconachie, Published London: Church Missionary Society, 1904.

== See also ==
- Zenana Mission
