= Pakistan Veterinary Medical Council =

- Abbreviation: PVMC
- Formation: 1999
- Headquarters: Islamabad
- Region served: Pakistan
- President: Prof. Dr. Masood Rabbani
- Vice President: Dr. Nazeer Hussain Kalhoro
- Parent organization: Ministry of Inter Provincial Coordination
- Website: pvmc.org.pk

The Pakistan Veterinary Medical Council (abbreviated as PVMC) (Urdu: ہیئتِ پاکستان برائے معالجہِ بیطار) is a statutory regulatory body for accreditation of veterinary education and registration of veterinary practitioners in Pakistan. It was established in 1999 under the Pakistan Veterinary Medical Council Act, 1996. Its headquarters is located in Islamabad.

Media reports in December 2018 stated the government had informed the PVMC of establishment of a new working group that would help modernise the country’s livestock handling capabilities.

== See also ==
- Faculty of Animal Husbandry and Veterinary Sciences (AHVS), Tandojam, Sindh
- University of Veterinary and Animal Sciences, Lahore
- Cholistan University of Veterinary and Animal Sciences, Bahawalpur
- University of Veterinary and Animal Sciences (Ravi Campus), Pattoki
