= Cholistan University of Veterinary and Animal Sciences =

University in Punjab, Pakistan

Cholistan University of Veterinary and Animal Sciences Bahawalpur
- Other name: CUVAS
- Motto: Knowledge to all
- Type: Public university
- Established: 2014
- Accreditation: Higher Education Commission of Pakistan; Pakistan Veterinary Medical Council
- Chancellor: Governor of the Punjab
- Vice-Chancellor: Professor Dr. Mazhar Ayaz
- Location: Bahawalpur, Punjab, Pakistan
- Website: cuvas.edu.pk

The Cholistan University of Veterinary and Animal Sciences (CUVAS) Bahawalpur, is a public sector institution established in Pakistan's Punjab Province to promote education, research, and innovation in veterinary, animal, and related sciences. Located in the heart of Southern Punjab, CUVAS aims to develop the livestock sector through skilled manpower and modern techniques. The university offers a range of undergraduate, postgraduate, diploma, and research programs, contributing to the region's economic and agricultural development.

== Programs ==
The university offers the following programs:

=== Undergraduate programs ===
- BS Animal Sciences
- BS Biotechnology
- BS Bioinformatics
- BS Genetics
- BS Poultry Science
- BS Artificial Intelligence
- BS Biochemistry
- BS Biological Sciences
- BS Chemistry
- BS Computer Science
- BS Computer Science (5th Semester Intake)
- BS Information Technology
- BS Food Science and Technology
- BS Human Nutrition and Dietetics
- BS Zoology
- Doctor of Veterinary Medicine (DVM)
- BS Applied Microbiology
- BS Medical Laboratory Technology
- Bachelor of Business Administration (BBA)
- Bachelor of Business Administration (5th Semester Intake)

=== Associate Degree Programs (2 Years) ===
- Animal Sciences
- Business Administration
- Computer Science
- Food Science and Technology
- Poultry Science

=== Diploma programs ===
- Livestock Assistant Diploma (LAD)
- Poultry Assistant Diploma (PAD)

=== Short Courses ===
- Artificial Insemination Technician (AIT)
- Dairy Farm Manager (DFM)
- Poultry Farm Manager (PFM)
- Village Veterinary Worker (VVW)
- ICT based Livestock Education (Online)

=== Post Graduate Diploma (1 Year) ===
- PGD Bioinformatics

Mphil Degree Programs(Morning)

- M.Phil Animal Breeding & Genetics
- M.Phil Animal Nutrition
- M.Phil Bioinformatics
- M.Phil Chemistry
- M.Phil Food Science and Technology
- M.Phil Livestock Management
- M.Phil Microbiology
- M.Phil Pathology
- M.Phil Pharmacology & Toxicology
- M.Phil Poultry Science
- M.Phil Biochemistry
- M.Phil Fisheries & Aquaculture
- M.Phil Zoology

=== MS Program ===
- MS Business Administration

=== Ph.D. Programs ===
- Ph.D. Animal Breeding & Genetics
- Ph.D. Animal Nutrition
- Ph.D. Pathology
- Ph.D. Microbiology
- Ph.D. Food Science and Technology
- Ph.D. Zoology

== See also ==
- University of Veterinary and Animal Sciences, Lahore
- Fisheries Research and Training Institute, Lahore
- College of Veterinary and Animal Sciences, Jhang
