= Pattoki =

Pattoki پتّوكى
- City
- Nickname: City of Flowers
- Location within Punjab, Pakistan Location within Pakistan
- Coordinates: 31°1′N 73°51′E
- Country: Pakistan
- Province: Punjab
- Division: Lahore
- District: Kasur

Government
  - Type: Municipal Committee
  - Chief Officer: Muhammad Ahmed
- Elevation: 197 m (646 ft)

Population (2023 census)
  - City: 113,735
  - Rank: 111th in Pakistan
- Time zone: UTC+5 (PST)
- Zip code: 55300
- Calling: 049

Pattoki (Urdu: پتّوكى) is a city in the Kasur District of the Punjab province of Pakistan. It serves as the headquarters of Pattoki Tehsil, an administrative subdivision of Kasur District. Pattoki is recognized as the 'City of Flowers' due to its abundance of floral diversity. However, it remains a significantly neglected city in terms of administrative support, with demands persisting for its elevation to district status, especially given its considerable distance from Kasur city, which serves as the headquarters of the Kasur district.The city is located at approximate elevation of 190-200 meters

== History and Etymology ==
Pattoki derives its name from the Patwan,a Hindu cast which used to live here in early days.in British era,the city undergone massive changes. After the construction of Railway Station,the city market was shifted to north of the station. Still the south part of station is referred to as "Purani Mandi(old market)". Pattoki used to be a great cotton producing town in colonial era.After the partiition of india in 1947, massive amount of immigrants settled here.The city shifted its focused from cotton to floral production gradually.

== Geography ==
Pattoki is situated on the N-5 National Highway approximately 73 kilometres (45 mi) away from Lahore, the capital of Punjab Province.The city is located in the historical region known as "Ganji Bar"(A region known for its massive forests before modern irriation system) lying between the River Ravi and Historical River Beas. It serves as a significant railway station between the Okara District and Lahore. Additionally, Pattoki is home to one of Pakistan's largest universities, the University of Veterinary and Animal Sciences, Ravi Campus.

== Demographics ==
=== Population ===
Historical population
Year	Pop.	±% p.a.
1951	12,456	—
1961	11,903	−0.45%
1972	20,006	+4.83%
1981	34,963	+6.40%
1998	58,961	+3.12%
2017	87,757	+2.12%
2023	113,735	+4.42%

Languages

Languages of Pattoki MC (2023 Census)
1. Punjabi (91.5%)
2. Urdu (4.50%)
3. Mevati (3.30%)
4. Others (0.70%)
