= Awards and decorations of the Bangladesh Liberation War =

Military awards

Awards and decorations of the Bangladesh Liberation War were decorations bestowed by the major warring parties for actions during the Bangladesh Liberation War. Bangladesh, India and Pakistan all issued awards and decorations related to the conflict.

A listing of the medals bestowed are as follows:

== Bangladesh ==
=== Gallantry awards ===
A total of 677 participants of the Bangladesh War of Independence received gallantry awards for their service and bravery. Four categories of gallantry awards were created after the war in Bangladesh. These were:

- Bir Sreshtho

The Bir Sreshtho (Bengali: বীরশ্রেষ্ঠ, lit. 'Valiant of Courage'), is the highest military award of Bangladesh. It was awarded to seven freedom fighters who showed utmost bravery and died in action for their nation. They are considered martyrs.

Recipients All the recipients of this award were killed in action during the Bangladesh War of Independence in 1971. The award was published by the Bangladesh Gazette on 15 December 1973. It is the highest military award of Bangladesh, similar to the U.S. Medal of Honor or the UK's Victoria Cross. It has only been given in 1973 to seven people. Listed below are the people who have received the Bir Srestho medal. They are all considered 'Shaheed' (Martyrs).

1. Captain Mohiuddin Jahangir †
2. Sepoy Hamidur Rahman †
3. Sepoy Mostafa Kamal †
4. Engine room artificer Ruhul Amin †
5. Flight Lieutenant Matiur Rahman †
6. Lance Naik Munshi Abdur Rouf †
7. Lance Naik Nur Mohammad Sheikh †

- Bir Uttom (Bengali: বীর উত্তম, lit. 'Valiant of Courage')

Recipients

No.	NAME	SECTOR	RANK
01	Khaja Nazimuddin Bhuiyan, (posthumous)	Sector-04	Leader Public Force/Gano Bahini
02	K M Shafiullah	Commander, S Force	Major
03	Ziaur Rahman	Commander, Z Force	Major
04	Chittoronjon Datta	Sector Commander-04	Major
05	Kazi Nuruzzaman	Sector Commander-07	Major
06	Mir Showkat Ali	Sector Commander-05	Major
07	Khaled Mosharraf	Commander, K Force	Major
08	Abdul Manzur	Sector Commander-08	Major
09	Abu Taher	Interim Sector Commander-11	Major
10	A N M Nuruzzaman	Sector Commander-03	Captain
11	Rafiqul Islam	Sector Commander-01	Captain
12	Abdus Salek Choudhury	Sector Commander-02	Captain
13	Aminul Haque	Commander, 8 East Bengal	Major
14	Mohammad Abdur Rab	Army chief, AHQ	Lieutenant Colonel
15	A K Khandker	Deputy Chief of Staff Army	Group Captain
16	Shahjahan Omar	–	–
17	Kader Siddique	–	–
18	Liakat Ali Khan	–	–
19	Shahabuddin Ahmed	–	–
20	Anwar Hossain Pahari	–	–
21	Aftab Ali	(Sector-11)3rd East Bengal	subeder
22	Motiur Rahman	–	Lieutenant Colonel

- Bir Bikrom (Bengali: বীর বিক্রম, lit. 'Valiant Hero')

A total of 175 fighters have been awarded on 15 December 1973 for their heroic actions at the Liberation War of Bangladesh in 1971. The government of Bangladesh declared the name of the awardees in Bangladesh Gazette on 15 December 1973. In recent 1 Bir Bikrom title award postponed. So total Bir Bikram awarded person is 174.

- Bir Protik (Bengali: বীর প্রতীক, lit. 'Idol of Courage')

This award was officially declared on 15 December 1973 through the Bangladesh Gazette. According to the Ministry of Liberation War Affairs, a total of 426 people have received the award.

=== Liberation War medals ===
Samor Pawdok (War Medal)
Joy Pawdok (Victory Medal)
Rono Taroka (Campaign Star)
Mukti Taroka (Liberation Star)

=== Civilian awards ===
- Independence Award

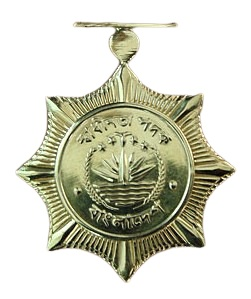
Independence Day Medallion

The Independence Day Award (Bengali: স্বাধীনতা পদক), also termed Independence Award (Bengali: স্বাধীনতা পুরস্কার), Swadhinata Padak, and Swadhinata Puroskar, is the highest state award given by the government of Bangladesh. Introduced in 1977, this award is bestowed upon Bangladeshi citizens or organisations in recognition of substantial contribution to one of many fields, including the War of Liberation, the language movement, education, literature, journalism, public service, science and technology, medical science, social science, song, games and sports, fine arts, rural development, and other areas.

- Bangladesh Freedom Honour -(Bengali: বাংলাদেশ স্বাধীনতা সম্মাননা, romanized: Bānglādēśa sbādhīnatā sam'mānanā); posthumously conferred on former Indian prime minister Indira Gandhi.
- Bangladesh Liberation War Honour -(Bengali: বাংলাদেশ মুক্তিযুদ্ধ সম্মাননা, romanized: Bānglādēśa muktiyud'dha sam'mānanā); conferred to heads of states and heads of governments:
1. (Bhutan) King Jigme Dorji Wangchuck
2. (Cuba) President Fidel Castro
3. (India) President Fakhruddin Ali Ahmed
4. (India) President Pranab Mukherjee
5. (India) Prime Minister Inder Kumar Gujral.
6. (India) Prime Minister Atal Bihari Vajpayee
7. (India) Acting Prime Minister Gulzarilal Nanda
8. (India) Minister of Defence V. K. Krishna Menon
9. (Nepal) President Ram Baran Yadav
10. (Nepal) Prime Minister/ Acting Head of State Girija Prasad Koirala
11. (Nepal) Prime Minister Bishweshwar Prasad Koirala
12. (Soviet Union) General Secretary Leonid IIyich Brezhnev
13. (Soviet Union) President Nikolai Viktorovich Podgorny
14. (Soviet Union) Prime Minister Alexei Nikolaevich Kosygin
15. (United Kingdom) Prime Minister Sir Edward Richard George Heath
16. (Socialist Federal Republic of Yugoslavia) President Marshal Josip Broz Tito
- Friends of Liberation War Honour -(Bengali: মুক্তিযুদ্ধ মৈত্রী সম্মাননা, romanized: Muktiyud'dha maitrī sam'mānanā); conferred to individuals, six organisations and Mitra Bahini. The individuals include 257 Indians, 88 Americans, 41 Pakistanis, 39 Britons, 9 Russians, 18 Nepalese, 16 French and 18 Japanese. Three ceremonies were held between March 2012 and October 2012.

== India ==
- Param Vir Chakra

Recipients of the Param Vir Chakra:

S. No.	Rank	Name
01	Lance Naik (Posthumously)	Albert Ekka
02	Flying Officer	Nirmal Jit Singh Sekhon (Posthumously)
03	Major	Hoshiar Singh
04	Second Lieutenant	Arun Khetarpal (Posthumously)

- Maha Vir Chakra

Recipients

S. no.	Rank	Name	Operation/War	Date of Award
01	L/Nt	Ram Ugram Pandey	1971 Operation Cactus-Lily	24 November 1971
02	Sep	Ansuya Prasad	1971 Operation Cactus-Lily	30 November 1971
03	Rfn	Pati Ram Gurung	1971 Operation Cactus-Lily	30 November 1971
04	Maj	Gen Shamsher Singh	1971 Operation Cactus-Lilly	1 December 1971
05	Vice Adm	Swaraj Parkash	1971 Operation Cactus-Lily	1 December 1971
06	Maj	Anup Singh Gahlaut	1971 Operation Cactus-Lily	3 December 1971
07	Brig	Basdev Singh Mankotia	1971 Operation Cactus-Lily	3 December 1971
08	Maj	Gen Anant Vishwanath Natu	1971 Operation Cactus-Lily	3 December 1971
09	Maj	Gen Kashmiri Lal Rattan	1971 Operation Cactus-Lily	3 December 1971
10	Maj	Gen Prem Kumar Khanna	1971 Operation Cactus-Lily	3 December 1971
11	Lt Col	Jaivir Singh	1971 Operation Cactus-Lily	3 December 1971
12	AVM	Vidya Bhushan Vasisht	1971 Operation Cactus-Lily	3 December 1971
13	Gp Capt	Allan Albert D'Costa	1971 Operation Cactus-Lily	4 December 1971
14	Sub Maj (Hony Capt)	Bir Bahadur Pun	1971 Operation Cactus-Lily	4 December 1971
15	Cmde	Kasargod Patnashetti Gopal Rao	1971 Operation Cactus-Lily	4 December 1971
16	Gen	Arun Shridhar Vaidya	1971 Operation Cactus-Lily	5 December 1971
17	Cmde	Babru Bhan Yadav	1971 Operation Cactus-Lily	5 December 1971
18	Capt	Devinder Singh Ahlawat	1971 Operation Cactus-Lily	5 December 1971
19	Lt Gen	Krishnaswamy Gowri Shankar	1971 Operation Cactus-Lily	5 December 1971
20	Brig	Kuldip Singh Chandpuri	1971 Operation Cactus-Lily	5 December 1971
21	Brig	Narinder Singh Sandhu	1971 Operation Cactus-Lily	5 December 1971
22	Wg Cdr	Padmanabha Gautam	1971 Operation Cactus-Lily	5 December 1971
23	Air Mrshl	Ravinder Nath Bhardwaj	1971 Operation Cactus-Lily	5 December 1971
24	Lt Col	Sawai Bhawani Singh	1971 Operation Cactus-Lily	5 December 1971
25	Lt Gen	Joginder Singh Gharaya	1971 Operation Cactus-Lily	6 December 1971
26	Brig	Kailash Prasad Pande	1971 Operation Cactus-Lily	6 December 1971
27	Brig	Mohindar Lal Whig	1971 Operation Cactus-Lily	6 December 1971
28	Sep	Pandurang Salunkhe	1971 Operation Cactus-Lily	6 December 1971
29	AVM	Chandan Singh	1971 Operation Cactus-Lily	7 December 1971
30	Maj Gen	Chittoor Venugopal	1971 Operation Cactus-Lily	7 December 1971
31	Lt Gen	Joginder Singh Bakshi	1971 Operation Cactus-Lily	7 December 1971
32	Sub Maj	Mohinder Singh	1971 Operation Cactus-Lily	7 December 1971
33	Maj	Chewang Rinchen	1971 Operation Cactus-Lily	8 December 1971
34	P/O	Chiman Singh	1971 Operation Cactus-Lily	8 December 1971
35	Cdr	Joseph Pius Alfred Noronha	1971 Operation Cactus-Lily	8 December 1971
36	Brig	Udai Singh	1971 Operation Cactus-Lily	8 December 1971
37	Capt	Mahendra Nath Mulla	1971 Operation Cactus-Lily	9 December 1971
38	Nt	Sugan Singh	1971 Operation Cactus-Lily	9 December 1971
39	Brig	Rattan Nath Sharma	1971 Operation Cactus-Lily	10 December 1971
40	Maj	Gen Harish Chandra Pathak	1971 Operation Cactus-Lily	11 December 1971
41	Maj	Gen Kulwant Singh Pannu	1971 Operation Cactus-Lily	11 December 1971
42	Brig	Sukhjit Singh	1971 Operation Cactus-Lily	11 December 1971
43	Maj	Vijay Rattan Choudhry	1971 Operation Cactus-Lily	11 December 1971
44	L/Nt	Drig Pal Singh	1971 Operation Cactus-Lily	13 December 1971
45	Capt	Pradip Kumar Gour	1971 Operation Cactus-Lily	14 December 1971
46	Brig	Amarjit Singh Bal	1971 Operation Cactus-Lily	15 December 1971
47	Sub Maj (Hony Capt)	Thomas Philipose	1971 Operation Cactus-Lily	15 December 1971
48	Lt Col	Ved Prakash Ghai	1971 Operation Cactus-Lily	15 December 1971
49	Lt Gen	Hanut Singh	1971 Operation Cactus-Lily	16 December 1971
50	Lt Gen	Raj Mohan Vohra	1971 Operation Cactus-Lily	16 December 1971
51	Capt	Shankar Rao Shankhapan Walkar	1971 Operation Cactus-Lily	16 December 1971
52	AVM	Cecil Vivian Parker	1971 Operation Cactus-Lily	17 December 1971
53	Air Cmde	Harcharan Singh Manget	1971 Operation Cactus-Lily	17 December 1971
54	AVM	Madhavendra Banerji	1971 Operation Cactus-Lily	17 December 1971
55	Maj	Malkiat Singh	1971 Operation Cactus-Lily	17 December 1971
56	Gp Capt	Man Mohan Bir Singh Talwar	1971 Operation Cactus-Lily	17 December 1971
57	Air Cmde	Ramesh Sakharam Benegal	1971 Operation Cactus-Lilly	17 December 1971
58	2nd Lt.	Shamsher Singh Samra	1971 Operation Cactus-Lilly	17 December 1971
59	L/Nt	Shangara Singh	1971 Operation Cactus-Lilly	17 December 1971
60	L/Hav	Dil Bahadur Chettri	1971 Operation Cactus-Lilly	21 December 1971
61	Rear Adm	Santosh Kumar Gupta	1971 Operation Cactus-Lilly	21 December 1971
62	Brig	Vijay Kumar Berry	1971 Operation Cactus-Lilly	28 December 1971
63	Air Chief Marshal	Swaroop Krishna Kaul	1971 Operation Cactus-Lilly	30 December 1971
64	Sub	Nar Bahadur Chhetri	1971 Operation Cactus-Lilly	31 December 1971
65	Col	Dharam Vir Singh	1971 Operation Cactus-Lilly	1 January 1972
66	Brig	Sant Singh	1971 Operation Cactus-Lilly	2 January 1972
67	Maj	Daljit Singh Narang	1971 Operation Cactus-Lilly	20 January 1972

- Vir Chakra

Recipients

S. no.	Rank	Name	Branch	Award Date	Awarded for
01	Adm	Laxminarayan Ramdass	Indian Navy	1 December 1971	Operation Cactus Lily
02	Subedar	Gurdev Singh Hans	Indian Army	4 December 1971	Operation Cactus Lily
03	Maj	Nanjappa K P	Indian Army	5 December 1971	Battle of Daudkandi
04	Lt Col	Raj Singh	Indian Army	15 December 1971	Operation Cactus Lily
05	Major	PK Sharma	Indian Army	6 December 1971	Operation Cactus Lily
06	Captain	Jatinder Kumar	Indian Army	6 December 1971	Operation Cactus Lily
07	Col	Gopal Krishna Trivedi	Indian Army	11 December 1971	Operation Cactus Lily
08	Lt Col	Satish Nambiar	Indian Army	11 December 1971	Operation Cactus Lily
09	Air Cmde	Jasjit Singh	Indian Air Force	17 December 1971	Operation Cactus Lily
10	Grenadier	Rafiq Khan	Indian Army	19 December 1971	Operation Cactus Lily
11	Vice Adm	Arun Prakash	Indian Navy	21 December 1971	Operation Cactus Lily
12	Squadron Leader	M A Ganapathy	Indian Air force	1972	Boyra Encounter (1971)
13	2/LT	David A Devadasan	Indian Army - 1 MAHAR	Battle of Harar Kalan	10/11 December 1971

== Pakistan ==
- Nishan-i-Haider

Recipients of the Nishan-E-Haider:

1. Major Muhammad Akram (posthumously)
2. Pilot Officer Rashid Minhas (posthumously)
3. Major Shabbir Sharif (posthumously)
4. Sarwar Muhammad Hussain (posthumously)
5. Lance Naik Muhammad Mahfuz (posthumously)

== See also ==
- Liberation War of Bangladesh
- Bangladeshi honours system
- Military awards and decorations of Bangladesh
