= List of National Defence Academy alumni =

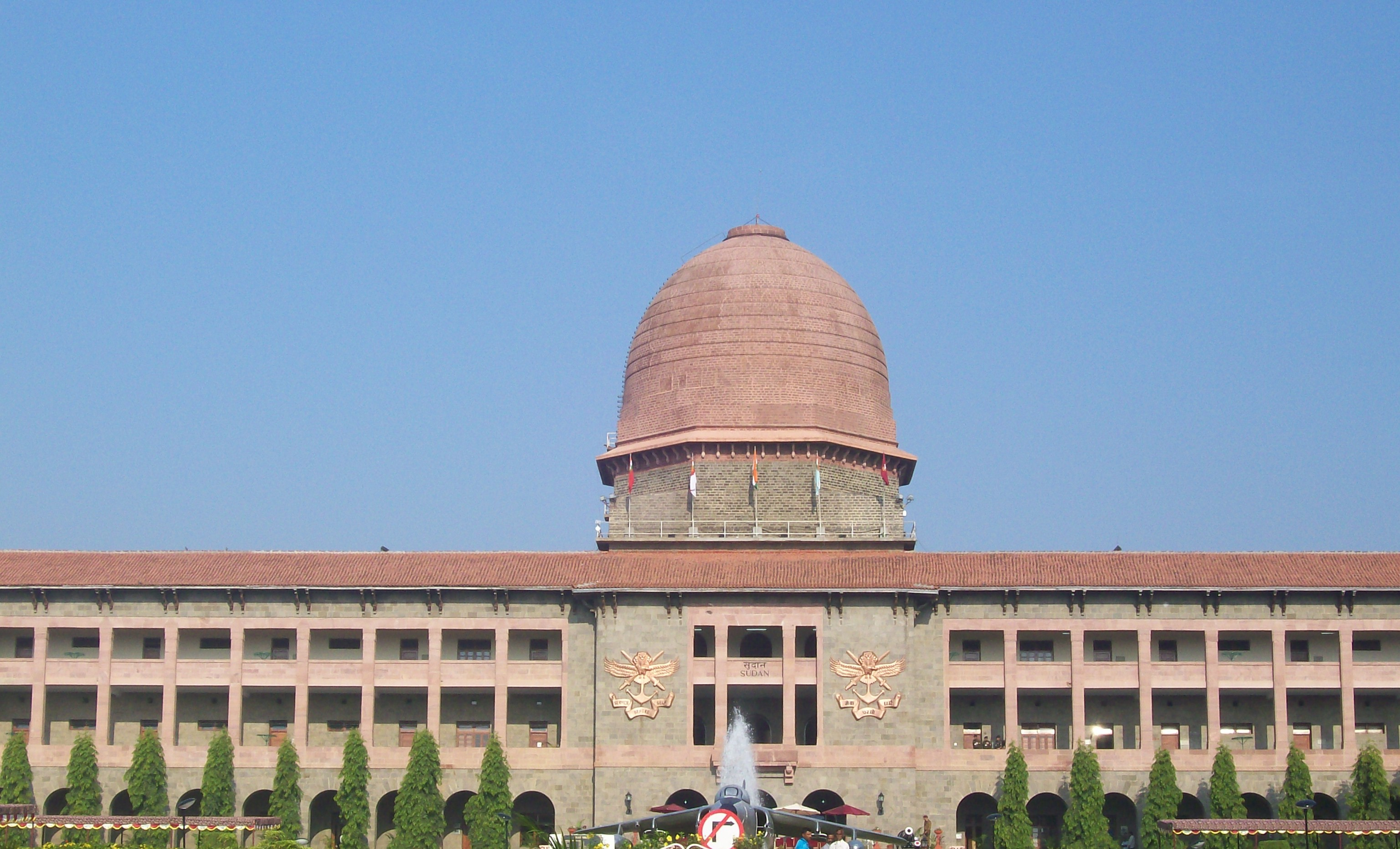
The Sudan Block of NDA

The Indian National Defence Academy (NDA) is the joint services academy of the Indian Armed Forces, where cadets of the three armed forces (the Army, the Navy and the Air Force) train together before beginning pre-commission training at their respective service academies (Indian Military Academy (IMA), Indian Naval Academy (INA), and Air Force Academy (AFA) for army, navy, and air force cadets respectively). Established in 1954 and located in vicinity of Khadakwasla Dam, near Pune, it is the world's first tri-service academy.

NDA is not the only officer training academy in India. Besides NDA, which is tri-service academy, the Indian Army's IMA, Officers Training Academy (OTA), Army Cadet College (ACC), the Indian Navy's INA, and the Air Force's AFA are the other officer training academies of India. Besides cadets from NDA, these academies accept cadets separately from several streams. Apart from these, the Indian Army has three establishments for technical stream which include College of Military Engineering (CME), Military College of Telecommunication Engineering (MCTE), and Military College of Electronics and Mechanical Engineering (MCEME). Although cadets are imparted technical training at these three academies, they are commissioned through OTA, Gaya. Excluding all these establishments, which are meant for combat arms, the Indian Army has other commissioning academies for support services such as the Medical Corps, and the Judge Advocate General's Department for example.

Similarly, the Aeronautical Engineers (Electronics) and Aeronautical Engineers (Mechanical) are trained at the Air Force Technical College at Jalahalli, Bengaluru; the Meteorological branch officer cadets get their training at Air Force Administrative College, Coimbatore.

NDA alumni have led and participated in every major conflict in which the Indian Armed Forces have been called into action since the academy was founded. Alumni include three Param Vir Chakra recipients and twelve Ashoka Chakra recipients. The NDA has produced 36 service chiefs of staff, including the incumbent chiefs of staff of the Army, Navy and Air Force.

== Chiefs of staff ==
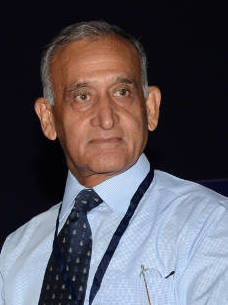
Admiral Arun Prakash

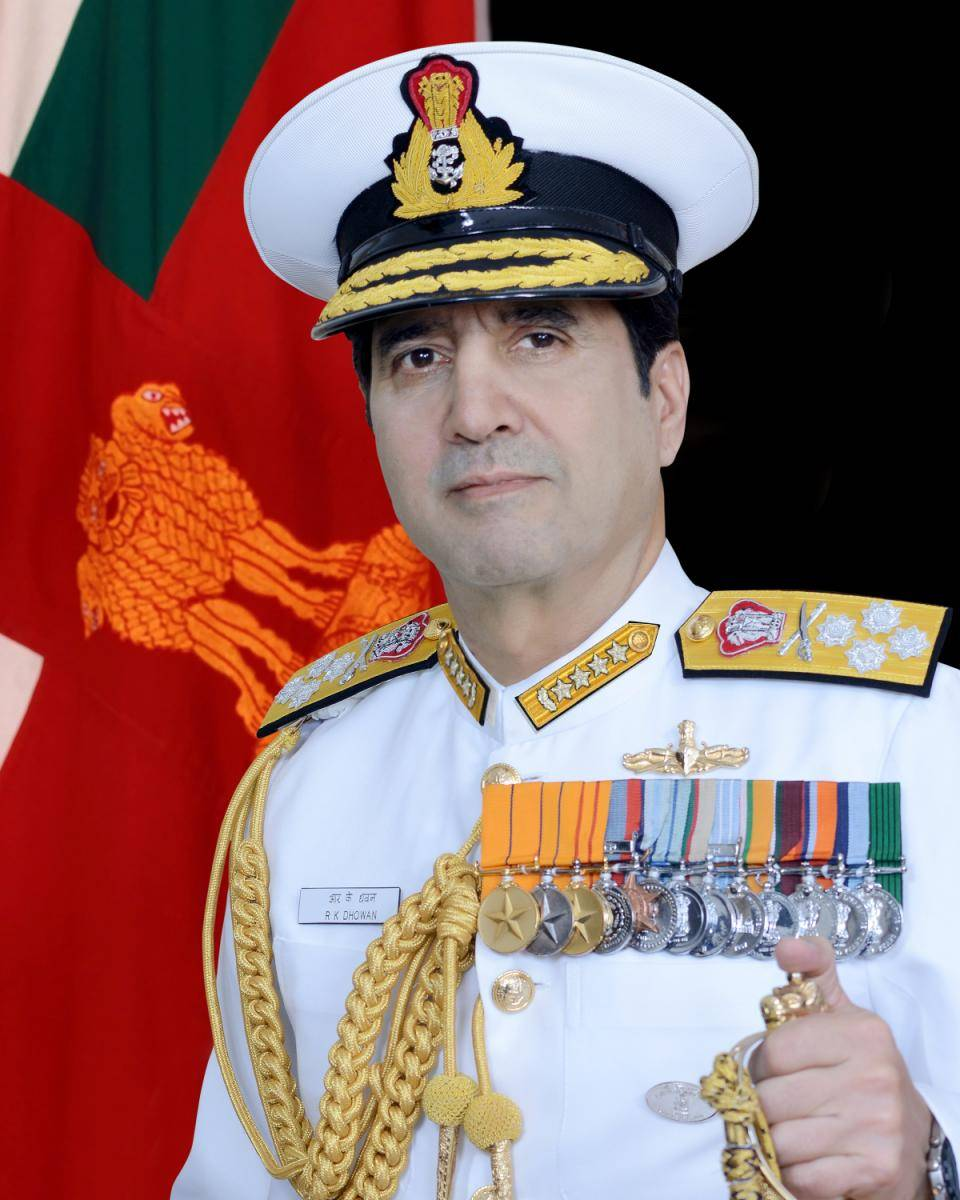
Admiral Robin Kumar Dhowan

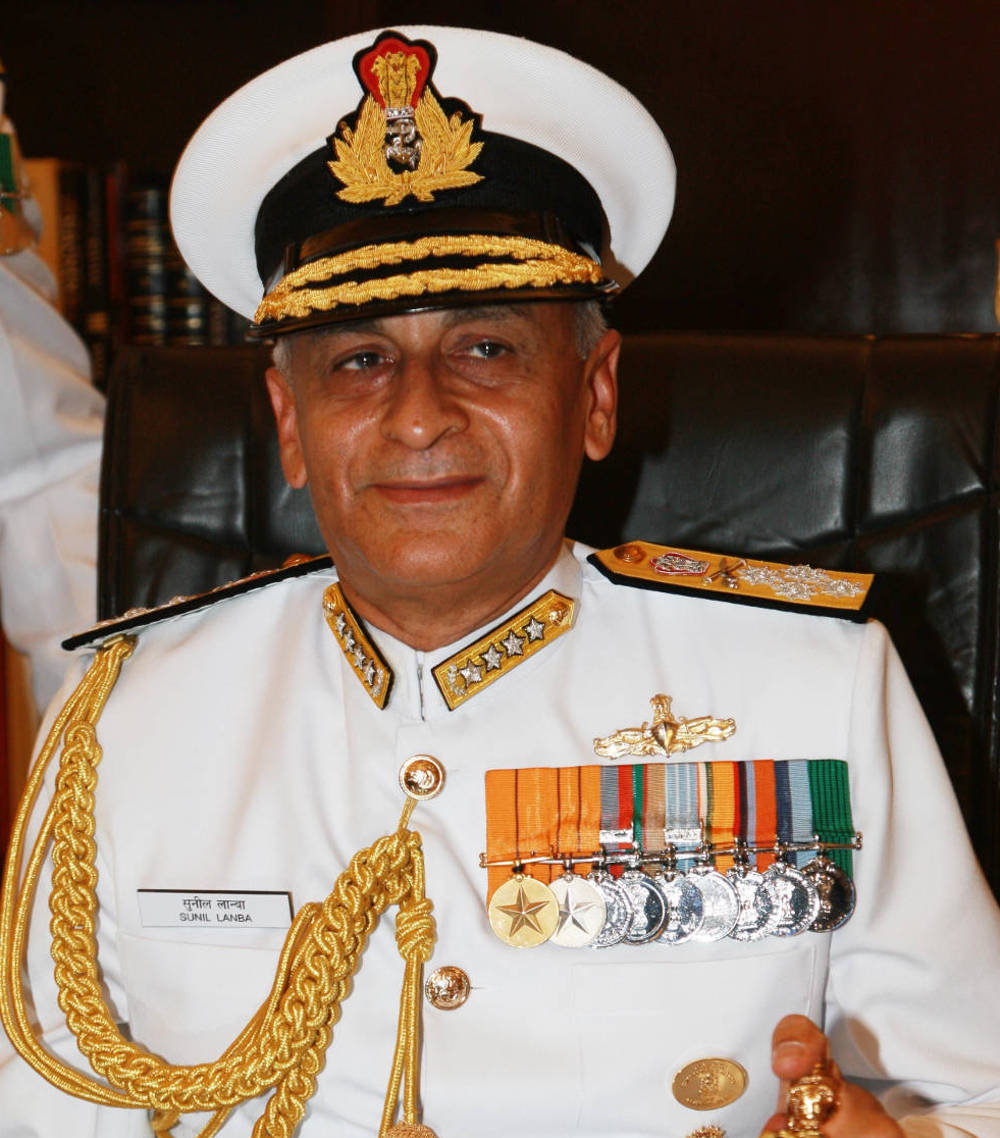
Admiral Sunil Lanba

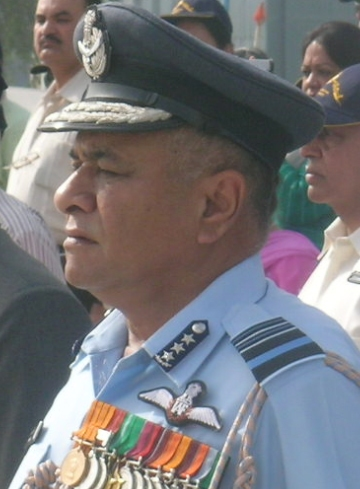
Air Chief Marshal Pradeep Vasant Naik

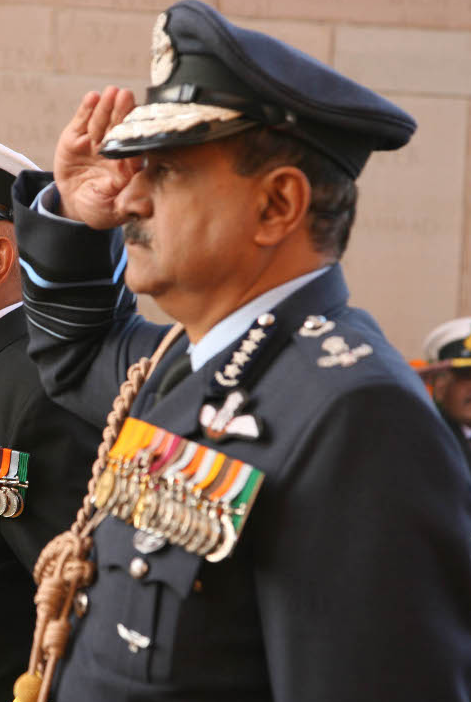
Air Chief Marshal Norman Anil Kumar Browne

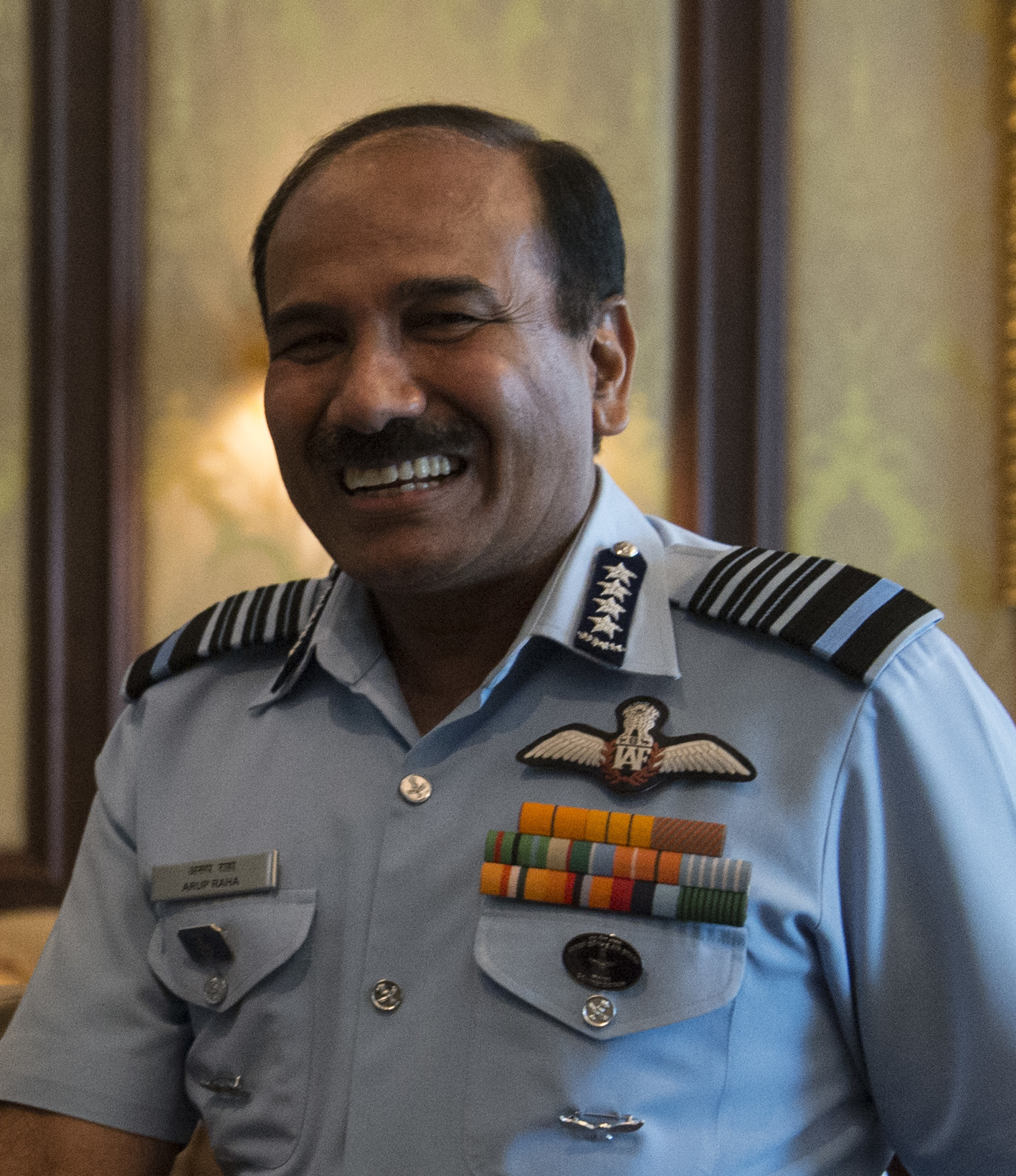
Air Chief Marshal Arup Raha

As of May 2026, the academy has produced 3 Chiefs of Defence Staff, 15 Chiefs of the Army Staff (COAS), 14 Chiefs of the Naval Staff (CNS) and 11 Chiefs of the Air Staff (CAS). All incumbent service chiefs (Chief of the Army Staff General Upendra Dwivedi, Chief of the Naval Staff Admiral Krishna Swaminathan and Chief of the Air Staff ACM Amar Preet Singh) are NDA alumni.

Chief of Defence Staff

S.No	Name	Course Number	Notes
1	General Bipin Rawat PVSM UYSM AVSM YSM SM VSM	53	First CDS
2	General Anil Chauhan PVSM UYSM AVSM SM VSM	58	
3	General N. S. Raja Subramani PVSM AVSM SM VSM	67	Current CDS

=== Chief of the Army Staff ===
S.No	Name	Course Number	Notes
1	General Sunith Francis Rodrigues PVSM VSM	1	26th Governor of Punjab.
2	General Bipin Chandra Joshi PVSM VSM	5	Died in harness.
3	General Shankar Roychowdhury PVSM	10	Former Member of Parliament (Rajya Sabha).
4	General Ved Prakash Malik PVSM AVSM	14	
5	General Sundararajan Padmanabhan PVSM AVSM VSM	15	
6	General Nirmal Chander Vij PVSM UYSM AVSM	21	Former National Disaster Management Authority vice-chair; Vivekananda International Foundation director
7	General Joginder Jaswant Singh PVSM AVSM VSM	25	14th Governor of Arunachal Pradesh
8	General Deepak Kapoor PVSM AVSM SM VSM	30	
9	General V. K. Singh PVSM AVSM YSM	36	25th Governor of Mizoram
10	General Bikram Singh PVSM UYSM AVSM SM VSM	40	
11	General Dalbir Singh Suhag PVSM UYSM AVSM VSM	44	
12	General Bipin Rawat PVSM UYSM AVSM YSM SM VSM	53	First CDS, Padma Vibhushan
13	General M. M. Naravane PVSM AVSM SM VSM	56	
14	General Manoj Pande PVSM AVSM VSM	61	
15	General Upendra Dwivedi PVSM AVSM	65	Current COAS.

=== Chief of the Naval Staff ===
S.No	Name	Course Number	Notes
1	Admiral Laxminarayan Ramdas PVSM AVSM VrC VSM	1	2004 Ramon Magsaysay Award for Peace and International Understanding
2	Admiral Vijai Singh Shekhawat PVSM AVSM VrC	7	Former Vice Chairman of Outward Bound India; Vivekananda International Foundation advisory board member
3	Admiral Vishnu Bhagwat PVSM AVSM	14	
4	Admiral Sushil Kumar PVSM UYSM AVSM NM	16	
5	Admiral Madhvendra Singh PVSM AVSM	20	
6	Admiral Arun Prakash PVSM AVSM VSM	26	
7	Admiral Sureesh Mehta PVSM AVSM	29	Former High Commissioner to New Zealand.
8	Admiral Nirmal Kumar Verma PVSM AVSM	35	24th High Commissioner to Canada.
9	Admiral Robin K. Dhowan PVSM AVSM YSM	45	
10	Admiral Sunil Lanba PVSM AVSM	51	
11	Admiral Karambir Singh PVSM AVSM	56	
12	Admiral R. Hari Kumar PVSM AVSM VSM	61	
13	Admiral Dinesh Kumar Tripathi PVSM AVSM NM	66	
14	Admiral Krishna Swaminathan PVSM AVSM VSM	70	Current CNS.

=== Chief of the Air Staff ===
S.No	Name	Course Number	Notes
1	Air Chief Marshal Nirmal Chandra Suri PVSM AVSM VM	1	
2	Air Chief Marshal S. K. Kaul PVSM MVC	5	
3	Air Chief Marshal Satish Sareen PVSM AVSM VM	12	
4	Air Chief Marshal Anil Yashwant Tipnis PVSM AVSM VM	15	
5	Air Chief Marshal Pradeep Vasant Naik PVSM VSM	33	
6	Air Chief Marshal Norman Anil Kumar Browne PVSM VM	39	Ambassador to Norway
7	Air Chief Marshal Arup Raha PVSM AVSM VM	44	
8	Air Chief Marshal Birender Singh Dhanoa PVSM AVSM YSM VM	52	
9	Air Chief Marshal R. K. S. Bhadauria PVSM AVSM VM	56	Former CAS
10	Air Chief Marshal Vivek Ram Chaudhari PVSM AVSM VM	61	
11	Air Chief Marshal Amar Preet Singh PVSM AVSM	65	Current CAS.

== Gallantry award recipients ==
=== Wartime ===
As of September 2023, 3 Param Vir Chakras, 32 Maha Vir Chakras and 163 Vir Chakras have been awarded to NDA officers.

==== Param Vir Chakra ====
Three officers from NDA have posthumously received the Param Vir Chakra, India's highest wartime gallantry award. All three were from the Army.

S.No	Name	Course Number	Unit	Year
1	Captain Gurbachan Singh Salaria	9	3/1 Gorkha Rifles	1961
2	Second Lieutenant Arun Khetarpal	38	17 Poona Horse	1971
3	Captain Manoj Kumar Pandey	90	1/11 Gorkha Rifles	1999

==== Maha Vir Chakra ====
32 NDA officers have received the Maha Vir Chakra, India's second-highest wartime gallantry award: two from the Air Force, one from the Navy and the remainder from the Army. Ten received the award posthumously. Air Force squadron leader Padmanabha Gautam is the only NDA officer to receive the award twice, in 1965 and 1971 (posthumously).

S.No	Name (Note: Rank is that held by the officer on the date of the award or action.)	Course Number	Unit	Year
1	Lieutenant Colonel Raj Mohan Vohra	1	Armoured Corps	1971
2	Lieutenant Colonel Hanut Singh	1	Armoured Corps	1971
3	Lieutenant Colonel Kulwant Singh Pannu	1	Infantry	1971
4	Lieutenant Colonel Narinder Singh Sandhu	2	Infantry	1971
5	Wing Commander Padmanabha Gautam	3	Indian Air Force	1965, 1971 (Note: Posthumous)
6	Major Sushil Kumar Mathur	3	Artillery	1965
7	Lieutenant Colonel Sukhjit Singh	4	Armoured Corps	1971
8	Second Lieutenant Shamsher Singh	5	Infantry	1971
9	Lieutenant Colonel Raj Kumar Singh	5	Infantry	1971
10	Lieutenant Colonel Harish Chandra Pathak	5	Infantry	1971
11	Wing Commander S. K. Kaul	5	Indian Air Force	1971
12	Lieutenant Colonel Ved Prakash Ghai	5	Infantry	1971
13	Lieutenant Colonel Surinder Kapur	7	Infantry	1971
14	Lieutenant Colonel Ved Prakash Airy	8	Infantry	1972
15	Major Bhaskar Roy	9	Armoured Corps	1965
16	Major Daljit Singh Narang	9	Armoured Corps	1972
17	Lieutenant Commander Santosh Kumar Gupta NM	10	Indian Navy	1971
18	Major Vijay Rattan Choudhry	13	Corps of Engineers	1971
19	Major Vijay Kumar Berry	14	Infantry	1971
20	Brigadier Manjit Singh	19	Infantry	1987
21	Second Lieutenant Bhagwan Dutt Dogra	20	Infantry	1962
22	Major Amarjit Singh Bal	22	Armoured Corps	1971
23	Captain Gautam Mubayi	23	Infantry	1965
24	Captain Pradip Kumar Gour	25	Infantry	1971
25	Major Basdev Singh Mankotia	28	Infantry	1971
26	Lieutenant Colonel Inderbal Singh Bawa	30	Infantry	1971
27	Captain Devinder Singh Ahlawat	31	Infantry	1971
28	Major Vivek Gupta	80	2 Rajputana	1999
29	Captain Anuj Nayyar	90	17 Jat	1999
30	Captain Gurjinder Singh Suri	90	12 Bihar	2001
31	Colonel B. Santosh Babu	102	16 Bihar	2021

==== Vir Chakra ====
163 NDA alumni have been awarded the Vir Chakra, India's third-highest wartime award. Of these, 96 are from the Army, 13 from the Navy and 54 from the Air Force. Notable recipients include Admirals Laxminarayan Ramdas, Vijai Singh Shekhawat, Arun Prakash, Lieutenant General Yogesh Kumar Joshi and Wing Commander Abhinandan Varthaman.

=== Peacetime ===
As of September 2023, 12 Ashok Chakras, 45 Kirti Chakras, and 152 Shaurya Chakras, have been awarded to NDA officers.

==== Ashoka Chakra ====
Twelve NDA officers have received the Ashok Chakra, India's highest peacetime gallantry award. Of them, one is from the Air Force and the remainder are from the Army. Eleven officers received the award posthumously. Wing commander Rakesh Sharma of the Air Force is the only living NDA Air Force officer to receive the award.

S.No	Name	Course Number	Unit	Notes
1	Second Lieutenant Pollur Mutthuswamy Raman	10	3 Sikh Li	CI Ops Naga Hill-03 Jun 1956
2	Squadron Leader Rakesh Sharma	35	Indian Air Force	Only Indian national to go into space; Hero of the Soviet Union
3	Colonel Neelakantan Jayachandran Nair KC	38	16 Maratha Light Infantry	1994; Kirti Chakra (1983)
4	Major Sudhir Kumar Walia	72	9 Para (SF)	2000; Sena Medal recipient
5	Captain Arun Singh Jasrotia	73	9 Para (SF)	1996; Sena Medal recipient
6	Major Rajiv Kumar Joon SC	78	22 Grenadiers	1995; Shaurya Chakra recipient
7	Second Lieutenant Rakesh Singh	79	22 Grenadiers	1993
8	Second Lieutenant Puneet Nath Datt	87	1/11 Gorkha Rifles	1997
9	Major Mohit Sharma	95	1 Para (SF)	2010; Sena Medal recipient
10	Major Dinesh Raghu Raman	95	Rashtriya Rifles	2008; COAS commendation
11	Major Sandeep Unnikrishnan	94	7 Bihar; 51 SAG (NSG)	2009, Operation Black Tornado
12	Captain Harshan R Nair	101	2 Para (SF)	2007

==== Kirti Chakra ====
Forty five NDA alumni have received the Kirti Chakra, India's second-highest peacetime gallantry award. Notable recipients include Colonel Neelakantan Jayachandran Nair, who is also an Ashok Chakra recipient and Lieutenant colonel Nectar Sanjenbam who is also a Shaurya Chakra recipient.

==== Shaurya Chakra ====
A total of 152 NDA alumni have received the Shaurya Chakra, India's third-highest peacetime gallantry award. Notable recipients include Major Rajiv Kumar Joon, who is also an Ashok Chakra recipient.

== Padma Awards ==
The Padma Awards - Padma Vibhushan, Padma Bhushan, and Padma Shri - are among the highest civilian honours in India.

=== Padma Vibhushan ===
General Bipin Rawat (53rd course) served as the first Chief of Defence Staff (CDS) of the Indian Armed Forces from January 2020 until his death in a helicopter crash in December 2021. Prior to taking over as the CDS, he served as the 57th Chairman of the Chiefs of Staff Committee (Chairman COSC) of the Indian Armed Forces as well as 27th Chief of the Army Staff. He was posthumously honoured with the Padma Vibhushan in 2022.

=== Padma Bhushan ===
Commodore Arogyaswami Paulraj (25th course), an Emeritus Professor at Stanford University, is noted for pioneering MIMO (Multiple Input, Multiple Output) wireless technology. This transformative innovation is the cornerstone of today's universal 4G/5G mobile and WiFi networks and has earned him numerous global awards.

Commissioned in 1965, he retired pre-maturely from the Indian Navy in 1991 before emigrating to the US. During his Naval service, he led the development of APSOH, the world's leading shallow-water anti-submarine sonar system, contributing significantly to the country's self-reliance. Paulraj also founded three national laboratories for the Indian government: the Center for AI and Robotics, the Center for Development of Advanced Computing, and the Central Research Labs (BEL). He received the Padma Bhushan in 2010 for his contributions to defense technology in India.

=== Padma Shri ===
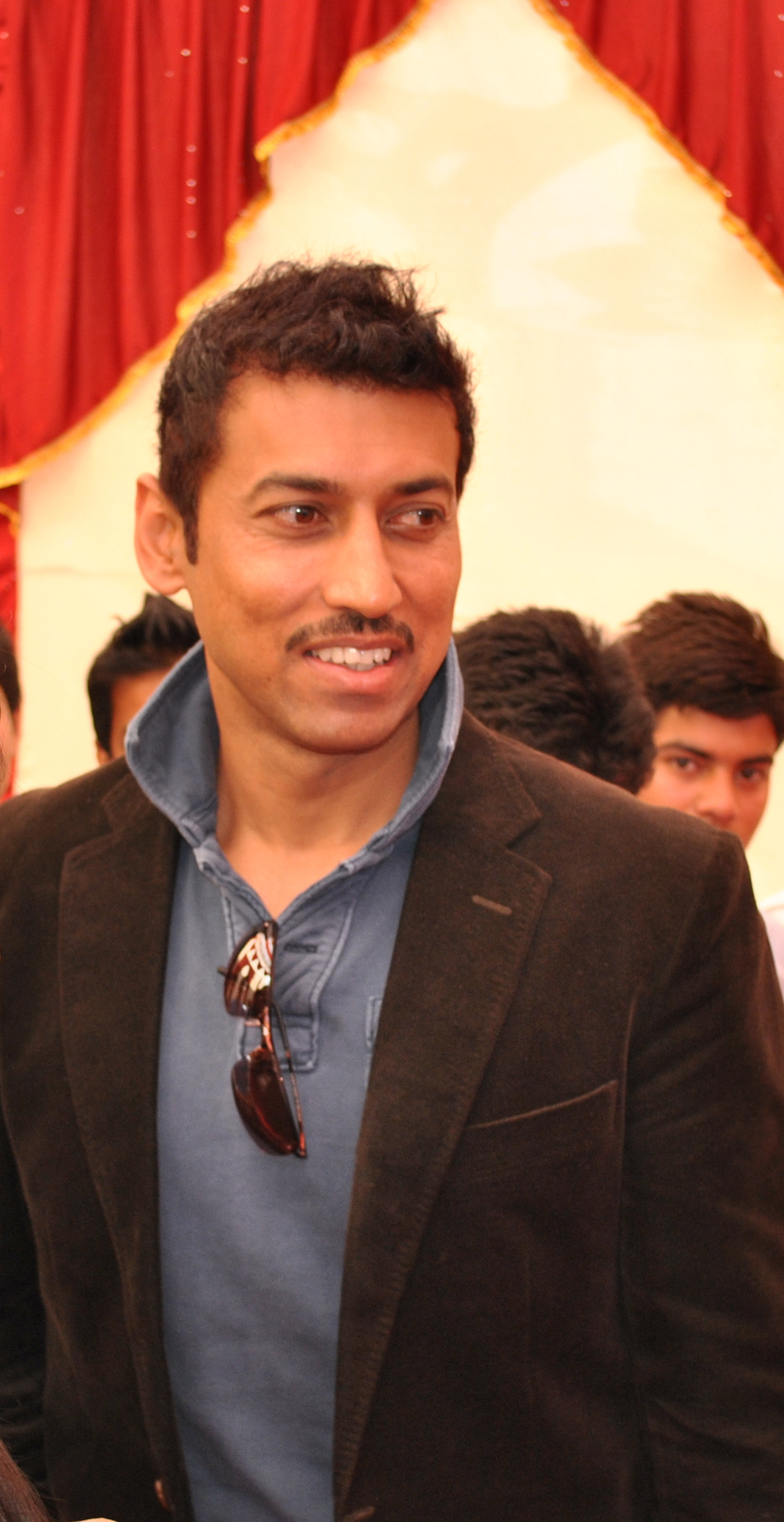
Colonel Rajyavardhan Singh Rathore

Colonel Rajyavardhan Singh Rathore (77th course) won the Silver medal in men's double trap at the 2004 Summer Olympics. He was awarded the Arjuna Award, the Rajiv Gandhi Khel Ratna award and the Padma Shri. He also won 3 gold medals and 1 silver medal in the Commonwealth Games (Note: Two gold medals: one in double trap individual and double trap pairs at the 2002 Commonwealth Games. One gold and one silver medal in double trap individual and double trap pairs, respectively, at the 2006 Commonwealth Games.) and 1 silver and 1 bronze medal in the Asian Games. (Note: One silver and one bronze medal in double trap teams and double trap, respectively, at the 2006 Asian Games.)

He joined politics and was elected as the Member of Parliament from Jaipur, Rajasthan and served as the Minister of State (Independent Charge) for Information & Broadcasting, Minister of State (Independent Charge) for Youth Affairs and Sports the Government of India.

== Others ==
No.	Name	Military awards	Course number	Notes
1	Major General Ian Cardozo AVSM SM	AVSM, SM	12	First NDA cadet to receive both gold and silver medals; First war-disabled officer of the Indian Army to command a battalion and a brigade.
