= Virk =

Surname used in Punjab

Virk is a last name used primarily by Sikhs in Punjab, which is based on that of a Jat clan supposedly founded by a Rajput called Virak.

Notable people with the surname, who may or may not be affiliated to the clan, include:

- Adnan Virk, Canadian television sportscaster
- Ammy Virk, Indian Punjabi-language singer
- Amrita Singh, Indian actress
- Bakhshish Singh Virk, Indian politician
- Harbans Singh Virk, army officer who served in the British Indian Army and the Indian Army
- Jani Virk (born 1962), Slovenian writer, poet, translator and editor
- Nawab Kapur Singh Virk, Sikh warrior
- Kulwant Singh Virk (1921–1987), Indian poet, writer and civil servant
- Manjinder Virk (born 1975), British actress, film director and writer
- Navneet Nishan, Indian TV actress
- Shahab-ud-Din Virk, British Indian lawyer and politician
