= Ram Chander =

Ram Chander may refer to:

- Ram Chander (MVC)
- Ram Chander (politician)
