= Arvind Singh =

Arvind Singh may refer to:

- Arvind Singh (Indian Navy officer)
- Arvind Singh (rower)
