= Jag Mohan Nath =

Indian military personnel (1930–2023)

Wing Commander Jag Mohan Nath MVC & Bar
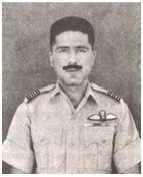
- Born: 8 August 1930; Jaipur, Rajputana Agency, India
- Died: 21 March 2023 (aged 92); Mumbai, Maharashtra, India
- Military career
- Allegiance: India
- Branch: Indian Air Force
- Service years: 1948–1969
- Rank: Wing Commander
- Nicknames: Jaggi, Professor
- Service number: 3946 GD(P)
- Unit: No.106 Squadron
- Conflicts: Sino-Indian War; Indo-Pakistani War of 1965
- Awards: Maha Vir Chakra & Bar

Wing Commander Jag Mohan Nath, MVC & bar (8 August 1930 – 21 March 2023) was an Indian Air Force officer. He was the first of the six officers to have been decorated with the Maha Vir Chakra, India's second highest war time military decoration, twice. He was decorated for his operations in the Sino-Indian War of 1962 and Indo-Pakistani War of 1965.

== Early life ==
Jag Mohan Nath was born on 8 August 1930, in Jaipur, and grew up in Layyah, Punjab, British India (now in Pakistan) in a Punjabi Hindu family of doctors. He served in the Air Force from 1948 to 1969, before taking up a position in Air India. He had two children, a son, Sanjiv Malhotra, born in 1952 and a daughter Arti born in 1956.

== Military career ==
Nath joined the Air Force Administrative College in Coimbatore in 1948. He was first awarded the Maha Vir Chakra for his role in reconnaissance missions in Aksai Chin and Tibet, before and during the 1962 war. His missions proved useful in learning about the Chinese military build-up in Aksai Chin. He flew around 30 reconnaissance missions into Pakistan during the 1965 war in an English Electric Canberra, which earned him his second Maha Vir Chakra. He would go over Pakistani territory including Lahore, Icchogil canal and Sargodha. In eastern Ladakh, Nath would fly into Chinese occupied territory. He had stated in an interview that "the Chinese could see me clearly and even fired at my aircraft," but other than that could do little as the Chinese did not have an air force at the time.

Nath had 3275 flying hours.

== Controversy ==
In an interview, Wing Commander Nath claimed that a mole was detected in the Indian Air Force's Western Command during the 1965 war. The mole was a group captain handling flight movements in the Western Command, though he declined to name the person as he was already dead.

== Death ==
Nath died in Mumbai on 21 March 2023, at the age of 92.
