= Chiman Singh =

Indian Navy sailor

Petty Officer Chiman Singh Yadav MVC
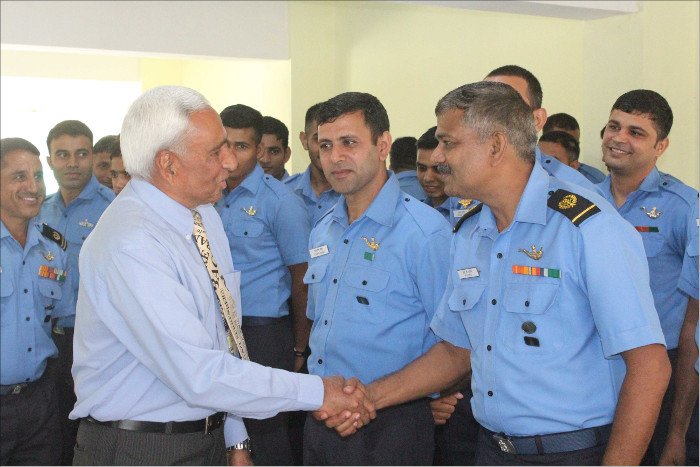
- Born: 1 June 1945; Gokulgarh Gurgaon Punjab, British India, Now Haryana, India
- Education: BS Ahir High School, Rewari
- Spouse: Vidya Yadav
- Relatives: Shashi Yadav; Reena Yadav (Daughters)
- Military career
- Allegiance: India
- Branch: Indian Navy
- Rank: Petty Officer
- Service number: CDI-87600
- Unit: Indian Navy
- Conflicts: Bangladesh Liberation War; Operation Cactus Lily
- Awards: Maha Vir Chakra

Petty Officer Chiman Singh, MVC (born 1 June 1945) was a sailor in the Indian Navy. He participated in the Indo-Pakistani War of 1971, and for his actions was awarded the Maha Vir Chakra, India's second highest gallantry award, and the Friends of Liberation War Award by Bangladesh.

== Biography ==
Singh was born on 1 June 1945 in Gokal Garh Village, Gurgaon District, Haryana to Shri Rao Nand Kishore Yadav. He is married to Vidya Yadav. They have two daughters Shashi Yadav and Reena Yadav.

=== Military career ===
Singh passed matriculation from BS Ahir High School Rewari and joined the Indian Navy as a sailor at the age of just 16 and rose to the rank of Leading Seaman in 7 years of service. Singh trained East Pakistan's Mukti Bahini fighters as the Bangladesh Naval Command, and is considered one of the founders of the Bangladesh Navy.During the Indo-Pakistani War of 1971, he was appointed as an instructor at the Indian Navy's Diving School in Kochi, Kerala. In the Indo-Pak War of 1971, he was sent to the East Pakistan Front and his team was tasked to attack enemy positions at Khulna and Mangla, his crew bravely executed their mission from 9 to 11 December . During the operation, his ship was attacked by enemy Air force, which sank his ship.The enemy shore defences opened fire on the overboard crew in which Singh was seriously wounded but Singh rescued his crew members and then attacked the enemy again to rescue two of his fellow sailors from enemy captivity . During this action, Singh was wounded and came under enemy fire and was captured by the enemy navy.After the independence of Bangladesh, he was admitted to the hospital and then Prime Minister of India Indira Gandhi visited him in the hospital. For the amazing courage and bravery of Chiman Singh in the Indo-Pakistan war, he was awarded the Maha Vir Chakra, India's second highest military gallantry award. He is the first and Only seaman (jawan) of the Indian Navy to be awarded the coveted Maha Vir Chakra.

=== Maha Vir Chakra ===
The citation for the Maha Vir Chakra reads as follows:

Gazette Notification: 18 Pres/72,12-2-72

Operation: 1971 Cactus Lily

Date of Award: 8 Dec 1971

CITATION

Leading Seaman C. Singh(OD 2), Service No.CDI 87600

(Indian Navy)

Leading Seaman C. Singh(OD2), No.87600 was member of a ship which attacked enemy targets in the Mongla and Khulna area during the period 8 to 11 December 1971. While operating off Khulna his boat was sunk. He was very badly wounded by shrapnel. Enemy shore defences opened fire at the survivors in the water. Leading Seaman Singh noticed that two survivors, including an injured officer, were finding it difficult to keep afloat. In spite of the injuries and unmindful of his personal safety he went to their rescue and escorted them to the shore through heavy enemy fire. On reaching the shore, in spite of his wound he rushed at the enemy exposing himself to the enemy fire, thereby malung it possible for his two colleagues to escape from being captured by the enemy. Leading Seaman Singh was eventually overpowered and taken prisoner by the enemy. On the liberation of Bangladesh, he was recovered and admitted to hospital. Throughout, Leading Seaman C. Singh displayed conspicuous gallantry and determination.

=== Friends of Liberation War Honor ===
In 2013, President of Bangladesh Zillur Rahman and Prime Minister of Bangladesh Sheikh Hasina awarded the Friends of Liberation War Honor to him for his contribution to the independence of Bangladesh.
