= Hardev Singh Kler =

Indian army officer (1924–2016)

Major General Hardev Singh Kler MVC, AVSM
- Born: Hardev Singh Kler; 3 September 1924; Ludhiana, Punjab, British India
- Died: 27 May 2016 (aged 91); Walnut, California, U.S.
- Other name: H. S. Kler
- Relatives: Captain Chhajja Singh Kler, OBI (father); Lt Gen. Gurdev Singh Kler, AVSM (brother); Wing Commander D. J. Kler, VM (son)
- Military career
- Allegiance: British India; India
- Branch: British Indian Army; Indian Army
- Service years: 1943–1988
- Rank: Major General
- Nickname: Harry
- Service number: IC-493
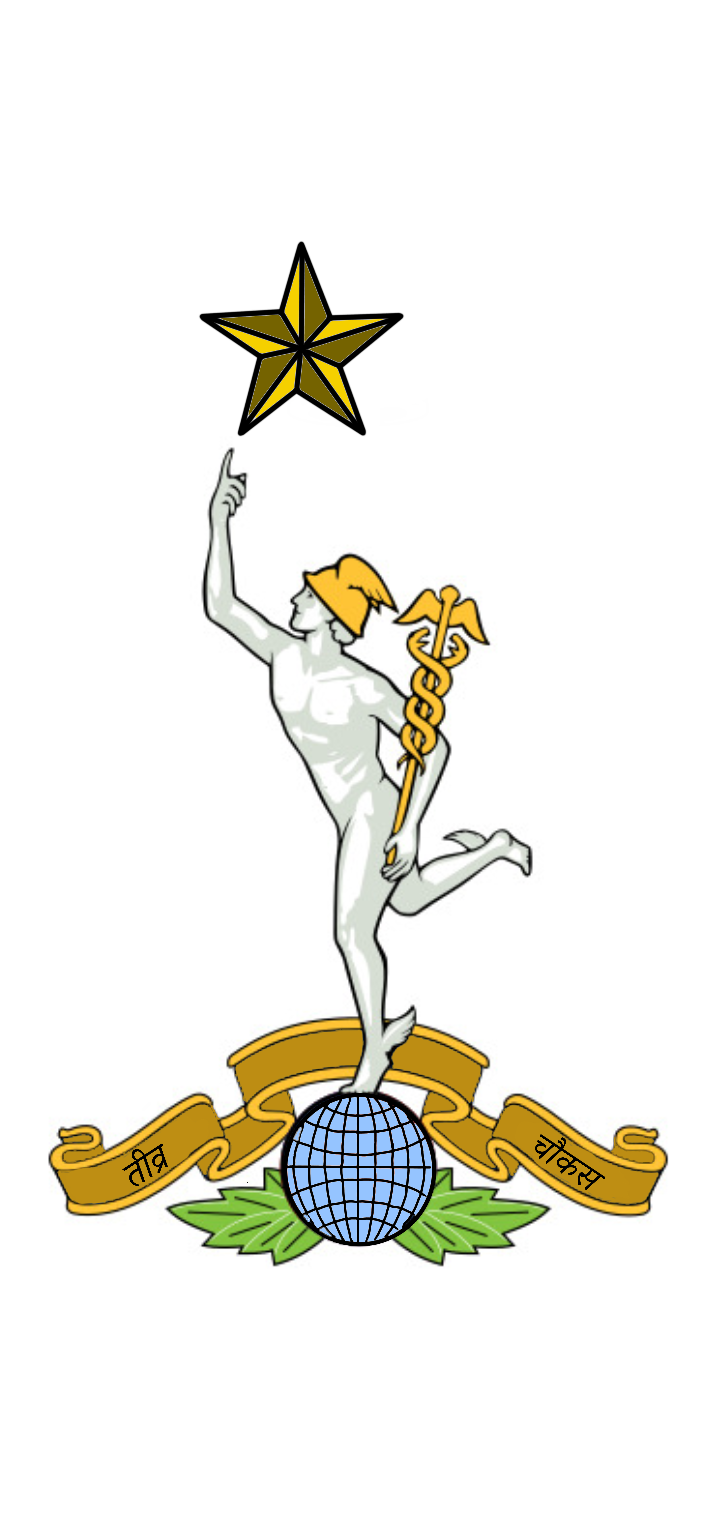
- Unit: Corps of Signals (India)
- Conflicts: World War II; Burma campaign; India–Pakistan war of 1965; Battle of Haji Pir Pass (1965); India–Pakistan war of 1971; Bangladesh Liberation War; Battle of Jamalpur; Defence of Kamalpur; Tangail Airdrop
- Awards: Maha Vir Chakra; Ati Vishisht Seva Medal

Major General Hardev Singh Kler, MVC, AVSM (3 September 1924 – 27 May 2016) was an Indian Army officer, known for leading India's first brigade which secured vital inroads to Dacca during the liberation of Bangladesh in Indo-Pakistani War of 1971 for which he was awarded with Maha Vir Chakra.

== Early life ==
Kler was born on 3 September 1924 in Kakrala Kalan village near Ludhiana, Punjab, India into a military family. His father Chhajja Singh was an Honorary Captain, his elder brother Shamsher Singh also served in Indian Army, his younger brother Gurdev Singh Kler retired as a Lieutenant General, and Kler's son Devender Jeet was a decorated Indian Air Force veteran.

== Army career ==
Kler was commissioned into the Indian Army in 1943, and in 1965 he was deployed as the General Staff Officer 1 of the 19th Infantry Division. Serving as a Brigadier, Kler played a major role in the India–Pakistan war of 1971. Kler led the 95 Mountain Brigade in the war.

=== 1965 ===
Lt. Col. Kler did not lead the assault column at Haji Pir Pass, but as GSO-I of 19 Infantry Division, he was centrally involved in the operational planning and control of the sector, including actions linked to the capture and holding of Haji Pir Pass.

=== 1971 ===
Among the architects of the 1971 victory, is known for his battlefield leadership and iron resolve. Commanding 95 Mountain Brigade, he spearheaded a lightning advance through Kamalpur, Jamalpur and Mymensingh, breaking fortified Pakistani defences and reaching the outskirts of Dacca in barely ten days. His handling of the Jamalpur battle reflected both martial honour and ruthless clarity of purpose.

== Maha Vir Chakra ==
Kler was awarded the Maha Vir Chakra, India's second highest gallantry award, in 1972.

Gazette Notification: 12 Pres/1972,8.2.71
Date of Award: 1972

Citation: Brigadier Hardev Singh Kler was commanding a Mountain Brigade on the Eastern Front during the recent operations against Pakistan. He led the advance from Kamalpur uplo river Turag, which involved clearing of enemy opposition at Kamalpur, Bakshiganj, Jamalpur, Tangail, Mirzapur and the west bank of River Turag, in addition to several delaying on by the enemy in between. During all these actions, Brigadier Hardev Singh Kler was personally present with the leading troops and directed the operations with complete dis-regard for his life. His handling of the troops during Jamalpur battle showed great professional skill and by personally going into the thick of the battle, he provided great inspiration of his troops who had laid siege behind enemy positions south of Jamalpur. Despite heavy casualties, he directed the operations so skilfully and courageously that all attempts by the enemy to break through were foiled. He inflicted heavy casualties on the enemy and captured 379 prisoners as well as large quantities of weapons and ammunition.

Throughout these operations, Brigadier Hardev Singh Kler displayed outstanding courage, inspiring leadership and complete disregard of personal safety in the face of the enemy in Keeping with the best traditions of the Army.

== Death ==
Kler died in Walnut, California on 27 May 2016, at the age of 91.

== In popular culture ==
- The surname Kaler of the lead character in the Hindi movie "Border 2" portrayed by Sunny Deol is loosely inspired by him.
