= Chandan Singh (air vice marshal) =

Indian military officer (1925–2020)

Air Vice Marshal Chandan Singh Champawat MVC, AVSM, VrC
- Born: 18 August 1925; Bagawas, district pali Jodhpur State
- Died: 29 March 2020 (aged 94); Jodhpur, Rajasthan
- Spouse: Junu Kumari (m.1963)
- Military career
- Allegiance: Jodhpur State (1941–1947); India (1947–1980)
- Branch: Jodhpur Lancers (1941–1947); Indian Air Force (1947–1980)
- Rank: Air Vice Marshal
- Commands: Jorhat Air Force Station
- Conflicts: Indo-Pakistani War of 1971; Sino-Indian War
- Awards: Maha Vir Chakra; Ati Vishisht Seva Medal; Vir Chakra

Air Vice Marshal Chandan Singh Rathore, MVC, AVSM, VrC (18 August 1925 – 29 March 2020) was an Air Officer in the Indian Air Force. A highly decorated officer, Singh was awarded the Vir Chakra during the Sino-Indian War and the Maha Vir Chakra during the Indo-Pakistani War of 1971.

== Early life ==
Singh was born in Jodhpur State, Pali district in a Rathore Rajput family to Colonel Bahadur Singh, OBI, who commanded the famous Jodhpur Lancers.

== Military career ==
=== Early career ===
Singh joined the Jodhpur Lancers in 1941, following in his father's footsteps, as a Second Lieutenant. After the Independence of India, the Jodhpur Lancers was amalgamated into the President's Bodyguard and the 61st Cavalry. Singh, then a Captain, joined the Indian Air Force.

Singh was serving in the No. 43 Squadron IAF, when in 1961, he was awarded the Ati Vishisht Seva Medal (then called Vishisht Seva Medal Class II). He was awarded the AVSM for "devising new procedures for training and selecting new safe routes."

=== Vir Chakra ===
At the outbreak of the Sino-Indian War, Singh was a pilot in the No. 44 Squadron IAF. He saw action in the Chip Chap area in Ladakh, where he was awarded the third-highest war-time gallantry award, the Vir Chakra.

The citation for the Vir Chakra reads as follows:

Gazette Notification: 18 Pres/63, 26-1-63

Operation: 1962 Leg Horn Date of Award: 20 Oct 1962

CITATION
SQUADRON LEADER CHANDAN SINGH
(3460) GD(P)

On 20th October 1962, Squadron Leader Chandan Singh was detailed to carry out supply dropping in the Chipchap area in Ladakh. On reaching the dropping zone, he noticed that the outposts were under heavy fire from the Chinese forces. He successfully dropped vital supplies to our garrison, although his aircraft was hit 19 times by enemy ground fire. Squadron Leader Chandan Singh displayed courage and devotion to duty in carrying out the task in complete disregard of his personal safety.

=== Maha Vir Chakra ===
Singh was promoted to the rank of Group Captain in late 1969 and took over command of the Jorhat Air Force Station in early 1970. He commanded the Air Force base through the Indo-Pakistani War of 1971. Singh planned and executed the Sylhet air-lift, when two companies of troops of the IV Corps were air-lifted. For this operation, Singh was awarded the Maha Vir Chakra, the second-highest war-time gallantry award.

The citation for the Maha Vir Chakra reads as follows:

Gazette Notification: 20 Pres/72,12-2-72

Operation: 1971 Cactus Lily Date of Award: 07 Dec 1971

CITATION
GROUP CAPTAIN CHANDAN SINGH, AVSM, VrC
(3460) F(P)

Group Captain Chandan Singh is the Officer Commanding of an Air Force Station in Assam. During the recent conflict with Pakistan, he was at the forefront of the air operations conducted for the liberation of Bangla Desh. He was responsible for the planning and execution of the special helicopter operations to airlift two companies of troops to the Sylhet area. When it became necessary to overcome the obstacles in the advance of the Army towards Dacca, he planned and executed the move of nearly 3000 troops and 40 tons of equipment and heavy guns with the extremely limited helicopter force at his disposal. This operation entailed landing the troops and equipment very near heavily defended areas by night. Prior to each mission, he personally carried out reconnaissance in the face of heavy enemy fire. On the night of 7th/8th December, he flew eight missions, deep into enemy territory, to supervise the progress of the helicopter airlift and to guide and inspire his pilots who were facing heavy opposition from ground fire. Later he undertook a further 18 missions in the same operation, always leading the landings at new places. On many occasions, his helicopter was hit by ground fire, but this did not deter him from further missions. The success of this major airborne operation contributed significantly to the fall of Dacca and the capitulation of the Pakistan armed forces in Bangla Desh.

Throughout, Group Captain Chandan Singh displayed conspicuous gallantry, organising ability, determination and professional skill.

=== Post-war career ===
After the war, Singh attended the Royal College of Defence Studies in the United Kingdom. Singh was promoted to Air Commodore in 1973 and to the rank of Air Vice Marshal in 1977. He then took over as the Senior Air Staff Officer (SASO) of the Central Air Command in Allahabad.

After a three-year stint as SASO, Singh retired in 1980.

== Awards and decorations ==

	Maha Vir Chakra	Ati Vishisht Seva Medal	
Vir Chakra	Wound Medal	General Service Medal (Naga Hills)	Samar Seva Star
Poorvi Star	Raksha Medal	Sangram Medal	Sainya Seva Medal
Indian Independence Medal	25th Independence Anniversary Medal	20 Years Long Service Medal	9 Years Long Service Medal
1939–45 Star	Burma Star	Defence Medal	War Medal 1939–1945
