= Kishan Singh Rathore =

Indian soldier and recipient of Maha Vir Chakra

Colonel Kishan Singh Rathore MVC
- Born: Churu district, Rajasthan, India
- Military career
- Allegiance: India
- Branch: Indian Army
- Rank: Colonel
- Service number: SS-13659 (short-service commission); IC-4735 (regular commission)
- Unit: 1 Rajput
- Awards: Maha Vir Chakra

Colonel Kishan Singh Rathore, MVC is a war hero of Indo-Pakistani War of 1947. He was awarded Maha Vir Chakra for his gallant act in the war.

He is from Ghadsisar (also known as Sardarshahar) in Churu district of Rajasthan, India.

He was enrolled into 1 Rajput/4 Guards unit. Lieutenant Kishan Singh Rathore was awarded Maha Vir Chakra in Indo-Pakistani War of 1947.

He received a regular commission and rose to the rank of colonel (promoted 20 August 1969), retiring from the Indian Army at that rank.
