= Sis Pal Singh =

Naik Sis Pal Singh MVC
- Born: Bamla, Bhiwani, Punjab Province, British India
- Spouse: Bhagwani Devi
- Military career
- Allegiance: India
- Branch: Indian Army
- Service years: 1940-1948
- Rank: Naik
- Unit: 2 Jat
- Conflicts: Jammu-Kashmir Operation of 1947
- Awards: Maha Vir Chakra (Posthumous)

Naik Sis Pal Singh, MVC (26 June 1920 - 10 April 1948) was a soldier in the Indian Army notable for his participation in the Jammu-Kashmir Operation of 1947. He was awarded the Maha Vir Chakra posthumously, for bravery in action.

== Personal life ==
Naik Sis Pal Singh was born on 26 June 1920 in the small village of Bamla in the Bhiwani district of what was then the Punjab Province of India. He belonged to a traditional agricultural family.His father name is Sheo lal Bhora

== Military career ==
Sis Pal Singh was recruited into 2 Jat battalion of the Jat Regiment in 1940.

During the Jammu-Kashmir Operation of 1947, Naik Shishpal’s unit was deployed in Jammu and Kashmir. Naik Shishpal Singh was Platoon leader and was tasked to lead an attack on point 3831 on April 9, 1948. In the initial stage of the attack itself, he was hit on the thigh by enemy fire but refused evacuation. He tied the wound with the first field dressing and continued to lead his men. On noticing an enemy machine gun firing and causing casualties on his platoon, Naik Shishpal, under intense fire, crawled to it through undergrowth, seized the machine gun barrel out and neutralised the bunker by lobbing a Grenade into it, killing its crew. When the platoon was within assaulting distance, he led his platoon and charged the enemy bunkers with bayonets drawn. Naik Sispal Singh bayoneted three enemy soldiers, however he too was bayoneted in the abdomen. Even after being grievously wounded, he kept exhorting his men to continue with the attack, which was successful and point 3831 was captured. Naik Sispal later died due to his injuries on 10 April 1948. Sis Pal Singh was awarded the Maha Vir Chakra posthumously for his bravery.
