= Asaram Tyagi =

Hero of 1965 India-Pakistan war

Major Asharam Tyagi, MVC
- Born: 2 January 1939; Fatehpur, Muradnagar, Ghaziabad, Uttar Pradesh, India
- Died: 25 September 1965 (aged 26); Dograi, India-Pakistan Border
- Military career
- Branch: 3 Jat, Indian Army
- Service years: 1959–1965
- Conflicts: Indo-Pakistani War of 1965
- Awards: Maha Vir Chakra (posthumous)

Major Asaram Tyagi, MVC was a hero of the Battle of Dograi in the Indo-Pakistani War of 1965.

On the night of 21 September 1965, Major Asa Ram Tyagi personally led the leading platoon of a company of 3rd Jat Battalion of Indian Army to capture a Pakistani position in Dograi village in Pakistan, which was defended by a troop of tanks, covering pillboxes and recoilless guns. While assaulting the position, Major Tyagi was hit by two bullets in the right shoulder. In spite of his injury, he pressed on against the tanks, personally destroyed the crew with grenades and captured two tanks intact. In this process he was again hit by three more bullets, but still continued to lead his company until he fell unconscious.

He was subsequently evacuated to a military hospital where he died. Greatly inspired by his conspicuous bravery, his men captured the objective.

== Military recognition ==
For displaying exceptional gallantry for the nation Major Asharam Tyagi was decorated with Maha Vir Chakra, posthumously.
