= Ram Chander (MVC) =

Recipient of Mahavir Chakra

Ram Chander MVC
- Born: 1921; Jalandhar, Punjab, India
- Died: 1998 (aged 76–77)
- Military career
- Allegiance: British India; Dominion of India; India
- Branch: British Indian Army; Indian Army
- Service years: May 1947 - Unknown
- Rank: Acting (Civilian military rank) Indian Army
- Conflicts: Indo-Pakistani War of 1947
- Awards: Maha Vir Chakra

Dhobi Ram Chander, MVC was a civilian who was awarded the Mahavir Chakra during the Indo-Pakistani War of 1947. He is one of only two civilians to have been awarded the Mahavir Chakra.

== Early life ==
Chander was born in 1921 in Kot Kishan Chand, Jalandhar, Punjab to Faqir Chand.

== Military career ==
Chander joined the 14 Field Company Engineers of the Madras Engineering Group of the Indian Army in May 1947. He was a civilian in the Indian Army and a washer-man (dhobi) by profession.

He was part of a convoy proceeding to Jammu under the command of Lt F D W Fallon on 18 December 1947. When the convoy reached Bhambla, it was ambushed by the enemy who had created a roadblock by removing the decking on a bridge. He helped the convoy commander replace the decking while the bridge was under continuous fire. On Lt. Fallon being wounded, he took the officer’s rifle and helped in holding the enemy at bay and was responsible for inflicting five to six casualties on the enemy. He later helped Lt Fallon to get to the nearest post which was 13 km away.

== Death ==
Chander died in 1998.
