= Mohindar Lal Whig =

Indian Army officer (born 1925)

Brigadier Mohindar Lal Whig MVC
- Born: 10 December 1925; Ludhiana, Punjab, British India
- Military career
- Allegiance: India
- Branch: Indian Army
- Service years: 1945-1981
- Rank: Brigadier
- Unit: 5th Gorkha Rifles (Frontier Force)
- Conflicts: Indo-Pakistani War of 1971
- Awards: Maha Vir Chakra

Brigadier Mohindar Lal Whig, MVC (born 10 December 1925) was an Indian Army officer. He served with the 5th Gorkha Rifles (Frontier Force) regiment. He was awarded the Maha Vir Chakra, India's second-highest award for his role in the Indo-Pakistani War of 1971.

== Career ==
During the Indo-Pakistani War of 1971, Whig commanded the 121 (Independent) Infantry Brigade Group in the Kargil sector. His brigade was tasked with capturing Pakistani posts overlooking Kargil. He proceeded to capture Olthingthang. Whig planned the operation, outmaneuvered the Pakistani troops, and attacked at an altitude of over 12,000 feet, with temperatures of 20 degrees below zero against well-entrenched positions. His force secured the objectives.

In recognition of this achievement, and for his demonstration of leadership and bravery in the field, Mohindar Lal Whig was awarded the Maha Vir Chakra, India's second-highest award for gallantry.

== See also ==
- Indo-Pakistani War of 1971
