= Harbans Singh Virk =

Recipient of Maha Vir Chakra

Lieutenant colonel Harbans Singh Virk MVC, DSO
- Died: Jammu and Kashmir
- Military career
- Allegiance: India
- Branch: Indian Army
- Rank: Lieutenant colonel
- Service number: IEC-801
- Unit: 3 PARA (Martha Light Infantry)
- Conflicts: Indo-Pakistani War of 1947
- Awards: Maha Vir Chakra; Distinguished Service Order

Lieutenant Colonel Harbans Singh Virk, MVC, DSO (1912–?) was an army officer who served in the British Indian Army and later the Indian Army.

== Background ==
Virk was born in village Chuhar Kanan, Sheikhupura, Punjab Province, British India (now in Punjab, Pakistan). After India's Partition, he appears to have settled in Kaithal, Haryana.

== Military career ==
=== World War II ===
Virk was commissioned in the Maratha Light Infantry, British Indian Army, on 4 August 1941.

There is some uncertainty regarding his service number, as British records state it as 'IEC-801', while Indian records state it as 'IC-656'.

Virk was awarded a Distinguished Service Order for gallantry in displayed in Burma in March 1945, as a Major commanding a company in the 4th Battalion (Sikhs) of the 12th Frontier Force Regiment, 17th Indian Division.

=== Post-Independence ===
Virk was awarded the Maha Vir Chakra on India's first Republic Day, 26 January 1950, for his leadership and gallantry at Naushera and Jhangar during the Indo-Pakistani War of 1947-48 in Jammu and Kashmir.

In 1953, he took command of 6 Kumaon Regiment.
