= Madhavendra Banerji =

Indian Air Force Officer (1934–2019)

Air Vice Marshal Madhavendra Banerji MVC VM
- Born: 4 January 1934; Kolkata, India
- Died: 17 November 2019 (aged 85)
- Military career
- Allegiance: India
- Branch: Indian Air Force
- Rank: Air vice-marshal
- Units: No. 101 Squadron IAF; No. 9 Squadron IAF
- Commands: No. 9 Squadron IAF; 16 Wing
- Conflicts: Indo-Pakistani War of 1965; Indo-Pakistani War of 1971
- Awards: Maha Vir Chakra; Vayu Sena Medal

Air Vice Marshal Madhavendra Banerji MVC VM (4 January 1934 – 17 November 2019) was an ex-officer of the Indian Air Force and a recipient of Maha Vir Chakra, India's second highest gallantry Award and the Vayu Sena Medal.

== Early life ==
He was born on 4 January 1934 in Kolkata, India, the son of Shri TK Banerji.

== Military career ==
Banerji was commissioned into the Indian Air Force on 16 April 1955. He saw action in both the 1965 and 1971 Indo-Pakistan War.

During the 1971 war, as a squadron leader and a senior pilot in No. 101 Squadron, a fighter bomber squadron equipped with Sukhoi Su-7 aircraft, he led a number of missions against enemy targets, most of them in support of Army operations in the Chhamb battles. During these missions, he destroyed enemy tanks and guns. He was personally responsible for attacks on the enemy and showed bravery and skill by repeatedly returning to the fray in the face of extremely heavy ground fire, which relieved pressure on Indian ground troops and enabled them to press on with their operations. For bravery and leadership displayed in combat missions, Madhavendra Banerji was awarded the Mahavir Chakra.

He later rose to the rank of air vice marshal before retiring. He died on 17 November 2019 due to natural causes at the age of 85.
