= Inderbal Singh Bawa =

Lieutenant Colonel Inderbal Singh Bawa MVC
- Born: May 25, 1947; Lucknow, Uttar Pradesh
- Died: October 13, 1987 (aged 40); Sri Lanka
- Education: Indian Military Academy
- Spouse: Smt Lily Bawa
- Children: Colonel Tejinder Bawa
- Military career
- Allegiance: India
- Branch: Indian Army
- Service years: 1967 — 1987
- Rank: Lieutenant Colonel
- Service number: IC-17621P
- Unit: 5 Gorkha Rifles
- Commands: CO 4/5 GR (FF)
- Conflicts: Indo-Pakistani War of 1971; Operation Pawan †
- Awards: Maha Vir Chakra

Lieutenant Colonel Inderbal Singh Bawa, MVC was an Indian Army officer who was killed in action in Operation Pawan. He posthumously received the Maha Vir Chakra award for gallantry.

== Early life and education ==
Bawa was born in Lucknow on 25 May 1947 to Dr. HS Bawa. He completed his education from DAV Higher Secondary School, Shimla. Later he joined Indian Military Academy.

== Military career ==
Bawa was commissioned in the 5 Gorkha Regiment on 11 June 1967. As a young officer, he took part in the Indo-Pakistani War of 1971.

Bawa was deployed to Sri Lanka to take part in Operation Pawan. Upon getting deployed, he quickly joined the battle and led his unit from the front. His unit had cleared LTTE hideouts at several places of Northern Sri Lanka.

On 13 October 1987, Bawa's unit was assigned the task to safely rescue trapped soldiers of 13 Sikh Light Infantry and 10 Para Commando SF stuck at Kondavil. Bawa led his unit to join the mission. However while completing the mission, a heavy exchange of fire occurred between Indian forces and militants. Subsequently, a bullet hit him and he was killed in action.

== Maha Vir Chakra ==
For Bawa's gallantry action, he was awarded with Maha Vir Chakra, India's second highest gallantry award. Bawa's Maha Vir Chakra reads as follows:

CITATION

LIEUTENANT COLONEL INDERBAL SINGH BAWA

4/5 GORKHA RIFLES (IC 17621)

Deployed in Sri Lanka as part of the operation of the Indian Peace Keeping Force, Lieutenant Colonel lnder Bal Singh Bawa landed with his battalion at Palai on 11 October 1987 and went immediately into battle with the task of clearing the Axis Vasavilan-Urgmpurai-Jaffna Fort. The militants desperately contested the advance from strongly fortified positions. The officer contained, bypassed, and reduced each position, inflicting heavy casualties on the militants. He personally led his command and was a sustained inspiration to his men. The battalion was again detailed to extricate 13 Sikh Light Infantry and 10 Para Commando teams from the Kondavil North East area. Lieutenant Colonel Bawa again led his battalion through the heavily fortified territory, linked up with the above force, and successfully extricated them on 13 October 1987. In this effort, a militant suicide squad sprayed him with a hail of bullets and he died fighting gallantly.

Lieutenant Colonel lnder Bal Singh Bawa displayed conspicuous bravery and vital leadership in the face of frenzied militants.
