= Ravinder Nath Bhardwaj =

Indian Air Force officer

Air Marshal Ravinder Nath Bhardwaj PVSM MVC VM
- Born: Lahore, Undivided British India
- Died: 13 Feb 2024 (age 89)
- Military career
- Allegiance: India
- Branch: Indian Air Force
- Service years: 08 oct 1955 to 31 july 1993
- Unit: No. 20 Squadron IAF "Lightnings"
- Commands: No. 20 Squadron IAF "Lightnings"; 15 Wing IAF; Southern Air Command
- Conflicts: Indo-Pakistani War of 1965; Indo-Pakistani War of 1971
- Awards: Param Vishisht Seva Medal Maha Vir Chakra Vayu Sena Medal

Air Marshal Ravinder Nath Bhardwaj PVSM MVC VM is a retired officer of the Indian Air Force and a recipient of the Param Vishisht Seva Medal, Maha Vir Chakra (India's second highest gallantry Award) and the Vayu Sena Medal.

== Early life ==
Air Marshal Ravinder Nath Bhardwaj was born in Lahore, Undivided British India in July 1935. His father is Shri P. N. Bhardwaj.

== Military career ==
Bhardwaj was commissioned into the Indian Air Force (IAF) on 8 October 1955. He saw action in both the 1965 and 1971 Indo-Pakistan Wars.

In January 1971, he served in an operational training squadron, where he instituted measures bringing about improved flying skills and knowledge of the trainees, for which he was awarded the Vayu Sena Medal.

During the 1971 war, he held the rank of squadron leader in No. 20 Squadron IAF, a fighter bomber squadron equipped with Hawker Hunter aircraft. As senior officer of the squadron, he led a number of deep penetration missions into Pakistani territory attacking heavily defended targets, including airfields, oil refineries and in support of ground operations. For bravery and leadership displayed in combat missions, Squadron Leader Ravinder Nath Bhardwaj was awarded the Mahavir Chakra, India's second highest gallantry award.

After the war, he went on to hold senior responsibilities:

- Director, Plans at Air Headquarters
- Air Officer Commanding of 15 Wing
- Deputy Commandant & Chief Instructor of National Defence Academy, Khadakvasla
- Air Officer Commanding-in-Chief at Southern Air Command, Trivandrum

He rose to the rank of Air Marshal, before retiring on 31 Jul 1993.
