= Arvind Singh (commodore) =

Retired Indian Navy officer

Commodore Arvind Singh MVC, NM
- Education: University of Lucknow
- Military career
- Allegiance: India
- Branch: Indian Navy
- Rank: Commodore
- Unit: MARCOS
- Conflicts: Operation Pawan, Sri Lanka
- Awards: Maha Vir Chakra; Nau Sena Medal

Commodore Arvind Singh, MVC, NM was an officer in the Indian Navy notable for his participation in Operation Pawan, in Sri Lanka as part of the Indian Peace Keeping Force. He displayed exemplary courage and leadership during the conflict. He was awarded the Maha Vir Chakra, India's second highest military decoration and the Nau Sena Medal for gallantry and leadership in different operations.

== Early life and education ==
Singh was born into a family with a background in civil service and medicine. His grandfather, Rao Bahadur Chaudhary Umrao Singh, was a district collector under the British government, while his father, Dr. Virendra Singh Chaudhary, was a veterinary officer. His mother was from Zirakpur, Punjab, and his maternal grandfather, Dr. Hazura Singh, was a civil surgeon. Singh studied at St. Francis' College up to high school and completed his intermediate education at La Martiniere College. He graduated from the University of Lucknow.

== Military career ==
Commodore Arvind Singh was a pass out of the Indian Naval Academy, Cochin and was the winner of the president's gold medal for being the best cadet at the passing out parade from the academy. He was also selected for training with US Navy SEALs.

On 21 October 1987, a team of Marine Commandos under then Lt. Arvind Singh's leadership was tasked to destroy Guru Nagar Jetty and speed boats of LTTE militants in the Jaffna Lagoon. In order to destroy additional militant speed boats, the team had to swim over a mile under water. Before the charges could be exploded the team came under heavy firing from the militants, resulting in casualties among the team. In spite of the enemy firing, the team successfully placed and detonated explosive charges and extensively damaged the Jetty and destroyed seventeen LTTE speed boats. For displaying great courage, determination, professionalism and selflessness he was awarded the Maha Vir Chakra.

In 1993, he was tasked with the interdiction and destruction of an LTTE ship off the coast of Madras, which he completed successfully as well. For this mission, he received the Nau Sena Medal (Gallantry).

The decorated Lt. Arvind Singh retired from the Indian Navy with the rank of Commodore.

== See also ==
- Indian intervention in the Sri Lankan Civil War
- Indian Peace Keeping Force
