= Ram Ugrah Pandey =

Indian Army soldier

Lance Naik Ram Ugrah Pandey MVC
- Born: 1 July 1942; Aima-Bansi, Ghazipur, Uttar Pradesh, India
- Died: 23 November 1971 (aged 29); Morpara, India-Bangladesh Border
- Spouse: Sunita Pandey
- Children: Sunita pandey
- Military career
- Allegiance: British India; India
- Branch: Indian Army
- Service years: 1962-1971
- Rank: Lance Naik
- Service number: 13657079L
- Unit: 8 Guards
- Conflicts: Indo-Pakistani War of 1971
- Awards: Maha Vir Chakra (posthumous)

Lance Naik Ram Ugrah Pandey, MVC was a war hero of Indo-Pakistani war of 1971. He was posthumously honored with India's second highest wartime gallantry award, Maha Vir Chakra.

== Early life ==
Lance Naik Ram Ugrah Pandey was born in a humble Brahmin family of the village Aima-Bansi in Ghazipur district of Uttar Pradesh. His father’s name was Shri Harakh Nandan Pandey. He got his education at his native place. After passing matriculation he got enrolled in 8 Guard of 202 Mountain Brigade of Indian Army in 1962.

== Death ==
During the India-Pakistan war 1971 in the battle of Morpara led assault on enemy’s fortified position supporting the advancing companies of Indian army. To keep the enemy at bay he captured an RCL and destroyed it. He shot three adversaries. However, in doing so a cannon shot burst very closed to him and he was killed on the spot. He is survived by his daughter Mrs Sunita Dubey .

== Military recognition ==
For displaying exceptional gallantry for the nation Lance Naik Ram Ugrah Pandey was decorated with Maha Vir Chakra, posthumously.
