= Chittoor Venugopal =

Indian military officer (1927–2021)

Major General Chittoor Venugopal PVSM, MVC
- Born: 14 November 1927; Tirupati, Andhra Pradesh
- Died: 27 April 2021 (aged 93); Tirupati, Andhra Pradesh
- Military career
- Allegiance: India
- Branch: Indian Army
- Service years: 1950–1986
- Rank: Major General
- Unit: 5/1 Gurkha
- Commands: 5/1 Gurkha
- Conflicts: Indo-Pakistani War of 1971
- Awards: Param Vishisht Seva Medal; Maha Vir Chakra

Major General Chittoor Venugopal PVSM, MVC (14 November 1927 – 27 April 2021) was a General Officer in the Indian Army. He was decorated with the Maha Vir Chakra for his role in the Indo-Pakistani War of 1971.

== Early life ==
Major General Chittoor Venugopal was born in the holy town of Tirupati, Andhra Pradesh, on 14 November 1927. His father's name was Shri C.Chinna Swami.

== Military career ==
Major General Chittoor Venugopal was commissioned into the Indian Army in the 1st Gorkha Rifles (The Malaun Regiment), on 10 December 1950.

At the time of the Indo-Pakistani War of 1971, he held the rank of Lieutenant Colonel and was commanding the 5/1 Gurkha Rifles battalion which was deployed in Jessore area of the Eastern sector. On 4 December 1971, his battalion encountered well fortified Pakistani positions at Uthali and Darsana which had a series of concrete pillboxes interconnected with elaborate communication trenches. Lieutenant Colonel Venugopal laid a plan of attack which he personally led. After capturing the two positions, the 5/1 Gurkha Rifles battalion pursued the withdrawing enemy troops, leading to the capture of Jhenida three days later. For his leadership and aggressive battle planning resulting in large military gains, he was awarded the Maha Vir Chakra, India's second highest gallantry award.
