= Maha Vir Chakra =

Military decoration in India

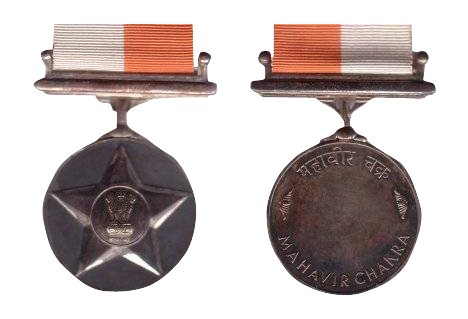
- Maha Vir Chakra medal and ribbon
- Type: Military medal
- Awarded for: "... acts of gallantry in the presence of the enemy on land, at sea or in the air."
- Country: India
- Presented by: Government of India
- Eligibility: Military personnel
- Status: Currently awarded
- Established: 26 January 1950; 76 years ago
- First award: 1947
- Final award: 2023

Highlights
- Total awarded posthumously: 74
- Total recipients: 213 (as of 2023)

Precedence
- Next (higher): Param Vishisht Seva Medal
- Equivalent: Kirti Chakra (Note: Though the Kirti Chakra is placed below the Maha Vir Chakra in the precedence, it is considered as a peacetime equivalent of Maha Vir Chakra.)
- Next (lower): Padma Shri

The Maha Vir Chakra (MVC) (lit. 'Medal for Great Bravery') is the second highest military decoration in India, after the Param Vir Chakra, and is awarded for acts of conspicuous gallantry in the presence of the enemy, whether on land, at sea or in the air. It replaced the British Distinguished Service Order (DSO). The medal may be awarded posthumously.

== Appearance ==
The medal is made of standard silver and is circular in shape. Embossed on the obverse is a five pointed heraldic star with circular center-piece bearing the gilded state emblem of India in the center. The words "Mahavira Chakra" are embossed in Hindi and English on the reverse with two lotus flowers in the middle. The decoration is worn on the left chest with a half-white and half-orange riband about 3.2 cm in width, the orange being near the left shoulder.

== History ==
More than 218 acts of bravery and selfless courage have been recognized since the inception of the medal. The most MVCs awarded in a single conflict was in the Indo-Pakistani War of 1971, when eleven were given to the Indian Air Force.

== Bar to MVC ==
Provision was made for the award of a bar for a second award of the Maha Vir Chakra, the first two being awarded in 1965. To date, there are six known awards of a first bar:

S. No.	Rank	Name	Branch	Date of First Award	Date of Second Award
1	Wing Commander	Jag Mohan Nath	Indian Air Force	1 January 1962	1 September 1965
2	Major General	Rajinder Singh Sparrow	Indian Army	19 March 1948	6 September 1965
3	General	Arun Shridhar Vaidya	Indian Army	16 September 1965	5 December 1971
4	Wing Commander	Padmanabha Gautam	Indian Air Force	6 September 1965	5 December 1971
5	Colonel	Chewang Rinchen	Indian Army	1 July 1948	8 December 1971
6	Brigadier	Sant Singh	Indian Army	2 November 1965	2 January 1972

No second bars have been awarded. Award of the decoration carries with it the right to use MVC as a post-nominal abbreviation.

== List of recipients ==
The Mahavir Chakra awardees include:

Key
†	Indicates posthumous honour

S. No.	Rank	Name	Branch	Operation/War	Date of Award
1	Lieutenant Colonel	Dewan Ranjit Rai	Indian Army	1947 Indo-Pakistan War	27-Oct-1947
2	Sepoy	Dewan Singh	Indian Army	1947 Indo-Pakistan War	03-Nov-1947
3	Naik	Chand Singh	Indian Army	1947 Indo-Pakistan War	22-Nov-1947
4	Subedar	Bishan Singh	Indian Army	1947 Indo-Pakistan War	12-Dec-1947
5	Jemadar	Nand Singh	Indian Army	1947 Indo-Pakistan War	12-Dec-1947
6	Colonel	Thakur Prithi Chand	Indian Army	1947 Indo-Pakistan War	15-Aug-1948
7	Civilian	Ram Chandar	Civilian	1947 Indo-Pakistan War	26-Jan-1950
8	Major	Yadunath Singh	Indian Army	1947 Indo-Pakistan War	26-Jan-1950
9	Lieutenant Colonel	Inder Jit Singh Butalia	Indian Army	1947 Indo-Pakistan War	26-Jan-1950
10	Lieutenant Colonel	Khushal Chand	Indian Army	1947 Indo-Pakistan War	26-Jan-1950
11	Brigadier	Mohammad Usman	Indian Army	1947 Indo-Pakistan War	26-Jan-1950
12	Lieutenant Colonel	Man Mohan Khanna	Indian Army	1947 Indo-Pakistan War	26-Jan-1950
13	Brigadier	Rajinder Singh	Indian Army	1947 Indo-Pakistan War	26-Jan-1950
14	Major	Annavi K Ramaswamy	Indian Army	1947 Indo-Pakistan War	26-Jan-1950
15	Sepoy	Man Singh	Indian Army	1947 Indo-Pakistan War	26-Jan-1950
16	Havildar	Daya Ram	Indian Army	1947 Indo-Pakistan War	26-Jan-1950
17	Colonel	Kishan Singh Rathor	Indian Army	1947 Indo-Pakistan War	26-Jan-1950
18	Subedar Major	Krishna Sonawane	Indian Army	1947 Indo-Pakistan War	26-Jan-1950
19	Major	Sardar Malkit Singh Brar	Indian Army	1947 Indo-Pakistan War	26-Jan-1950
20	Major	Satyapal Chopra	Indian Army	1947 Indo-Pakistan War	26-Jan-1950
21	Lieutenant Colonel	Hari Chand	Indian Army	1947 Indo-Pakistan War	26-Jan-1950
22	Sepoy	Hari Singh	Indian Army	1948 Operation Polo	17-Mar-1948
23	Subedar	Gurdial Singh	Indian Army	1947 Indo-Pakistan War	26-Jan-1950
24	Major General	Rajinder Singh Sparrow	Indian Army	1947 Indo-Pakistan War	26-Jan-1950
25	Brigadier	Arvind Nilkanth Jatar	Indian Army	1947 Indo-Pakistan War	26-Jan-1950
26	Naik	Shishpal Singh	Indian Army	1947 Indo-Pakistan War	26-Jan-1950
27	Rifleman	Dhonkal Singh	Indian Army	1947 Indo-Pakistan War	26-Jan-1950
28	Lieutenant Colonel	Kaman Singh	Indian Army	1947 Indo-Pakistan War	26-Jan-1950
29	Jemadar	Lal Bahadur Khattri	Indian Army	1947 Indo-Pakistan War	26-Jan-1952
30	Jemadar	Hardev Singh	Indian Army	1947 Indo-Pakistan War	26-Jan-1950
31	Naik	Nar Singh	Indian Army	1947 Indo-Pakistan War	26-Jan-1950
32	Naik	Raju	Indian Army	1947 Indo-Pakistan War	26-Jan-1950
33	Subedar	Chuni Ram	Indian Army	1947 Indo-Pakistan War	26-Jan-1950
34	Civilian Porter	Mohd Ismail	Civilian	1947 Indo-Pakistan War	26-Jan-1950
35	Sepoy	Amar Singh	Indian Army	1947 Indo-Pakistan War	26-Jan-1950
36	Major	Chewang Rinchen	Indian Army	1947 Indo-Pakistan War	01-Jul-1948
37	Naik	Pritam Singh	Indian Army	1947 Indo-Pakistan War	26-Jan-1950
38	Jemadar	Sampooran Singh	Indian Army	1947 Indo-Pakistan War	26-Jan-1950
39	Brigadier	Sher Jung Thapa	Indian Army	1947 Indo-Pakistan War	26-Jan-1950
40	Subedar	Fateh Singh	Indian Army	1947 Indo-Pakistan War	26-Jan-1950
41	Lieutenant Colonel	Harbans Singh Virk	Indian Army	1947 Indo-Pakistan War	26-Jan-1950
42	Lieutenant General	Anil Krishna Barat	Indian Army	1947 Indo-Pakistan War	26-Jan-1950
43	Lance Naik	Rabi Lal Thapa	Indian Army	1947 Indo-Pakistan War	26-Jan-1950
44	Lieutenant Colonel	Dharam Singh	Indian Army	1947 Indo-Pakistan War	26-Jan-1950
45	Major General	Anant Singh Pathania	Indian Army	1947 Indo-Pakistan War	26-Jan-1950
46	Havildar	Ram Parsad Gurung	Indian Army	1947 Indo-Pakistan War	26-Jan-1950
47	Jemadar	Lal Singh	Indian Army	1948 Operation Polo	15-Nov-1948
48	Brigadier	Kanhya Lal Atal	Indian Army	1947 Indo-Pakistan War	26-Jan-1950
49	Captain	Dara Dinshaw Mistry	Indian Army	1947 Indo-Pakistan War	26-Jan-1950
50	Air Commodore	Mehar Singh	Indian Air Force	1947 Indo-Pakistan War	26-Jan-1950
51	Air Marshal	Minoo Merwan Engineer	Indian Air Force	1947 Indo-Pakistan War	26-Jan-1950
52	Wing Commander	Sidney Basil Norohna	Indian Air Force	1947 Indo-Pakistan War	26-Jan-1950
53	Lieutenant Colonel	AG Rangaraj	Indian Army	1951 Operation Tomahawk	24-Mar-1951
54	Colonel	Nirod Baran Banerjee	Indian Army	1951 Operation Tomahawk	March-1951
55	Air Chief Marshal	Hrushikesh Moolgavkar	Indian Air Force	1961 Operation Vijay: Goa	08-Dec-1951
56	Lance Naik	Ran Bahadur Gurung	Indian Army	1961 UN Operation: Congo	06-Dec-1961
57	Naik	Mahabir Thapa	Indian Army	1962 UN Operation: Congo	16-Dec-1961
58	Wing Commander	Jag Mohan Nath	Indian Air Force	1962 Operation Leg Horn	01-Jan-1962
59	Naik	Chain Singh	Indian Army	1962 Operation Leg Horn	10-Oct-1962
60	Subedar	Kanshi Ram	Indian Army	1962 Operation Leg Horn	10-Oct-1962
61	Havildar	Sarup Singh	Indian Army	1962 Operation Leg Horn	19-Oct-1962
62	Lieutenant Colonel	Bhagwan Dutt Dogra	Indian Army	1962 Indo-China War	20-Oct-1962
63	Second lieutenant	GKV Prasanna Rao	Indian Army	1962 Indo-China War	20-Oct-1962
64	Lieutenant Colonel	Gurdial Singh	Indian Army	1962 Indo-China War	20-Oct-1962
65	Captain	Mahabir Prasad	Indian Army	1962 Indo-China War	20-Oct-1962
66	Major	Mahander Singh Chaudhary	Indian Army	1962 Indo-China War	20-Oct-1962
67	Lieutenant Colonel	Sardul Singh Randhawa	Indian Army	1962 Indo-China War	20-Oct-1962
68	Brigadier	Sher Pratap Singh Shrikent	Indian Army	1962 Indo-China War	20-Oct-1962
69	Subedar	Sonam Stopdhan	Indian Army	1962 Indo-China War	20-Oct-1962
70	General	Tapishwar Narain Raina	Indian Army	1962 Indo-China War	20-Oct-1962
71	Naib Subedar	Rabi Lal Thapa	Indian Army	1962 Indo-China War	21-Oct-1962
72	Colonel	Ajit Singh	Indian Army	1962 Indo-China War	22-Oct-1962
73	Major General	Bejoy Mohan Bhattacharjea	Indian Army	1962 Indo-China War	25-Oct-1962
74	Sepoy	Kewal Singh	Indian Army	1962 Indo-China War	26-Oct-1962
75	Havildar	Satigian Phunchok	Indian Army	1962 Indo-China War	27-Oct-1962
76	Jemadar	Isht Tundup	Indian Army	1962 Indo-China War	27-Oct-1962
77	Rifleman	Jaswant Singh Rawat	Indian Army	1962 Indo-China War	17-Nov-1962
78	Major	Shyamal Dev Goswami	Indian Army	1962 Indo-China War	18-Nov-1962
79	Lieutenant	Ved Prakash Trehan	Indian Army	Congo Crisis	29-Dec-1962
80	Major General	Sushil Kumar Mathur	Indian Army	1965 Operation Ablaze	15-Apr-1965
81	Major	Baljit Singh Randhawa	Indian Army	1965 Operation Ablaze	17-May-1965
82	Captain	Chander Narain Singh	Indian Army	1965 Operation Ablaze	05-Aug-1965
83	Major General	Swarup Singh Kalaan	Indian Army	1965 Operation Ablaze	05-Aug-1965
84	Lieutenant General	Ram Dharam Dass Hira	Indian Army	1965 Operation Ablaze	05-Aug-1965
85	Lieutenant General	Zorawar Chand Bakshi	Indian Army	1965 Operation Ablaze	05-Aug-1965
86	Colonel	Gurbans Singh Sangha	Indian Army	1965 Operation Riddle	15-Aug-1965
87	Lieutenant General	Ranjit Singh Dayal	Indian Army	1965 Operation Riddle	25-Aug-1965
88	Major	Bhaskar Roy	Indian Army	1965 Operation Riddle	01-Sep-1965
89	Wing Commander	Jag Mohan Nath	Indian Air Force	1965 Operation Riddle	01-Sep-1965
90	Air Commodore	William MacDonald Goodman	Indian Air Force	1965 Operation Riddle	01-Sep-1965
91	Subedar	Ajit Singh	Indian Army	1965 Operation Riddle	06-Sep-1965
92	Brigadier	Desmond Hayde	Indian Army	1965 Operation Riddle	06-Sep-1965
93	Major General	Gurbaksh Singh	Indian Army	1965 Operation Riddle	06-Sep-1965
94	Major General	Rajinder Singh Sparrow	Indian Army	1965 Operation Riddle	06-Sep-1965
95	Lieutenant General	Har Krishen Sibal	Indian Army	1965 Operation Riddle	06-Sep-1965
96	Lieutenant General	Khem Karan Singh	Indian Army	1965 Operation Riddle	06-Sep-1965
97	Lieutenant Colonel	Narindra Nath Khanna	Indian Army	1965 Operation Riddle	06-Sep-1965
98	Wing Commander	Padmanabha Gautam	Indian Air Force	1965 Operation Riddle	06-Sep-1965
99	Air Marshal	Prem Pal Singh	Indian Air Force	1965 Operation Riddle	06-Sep-1965
100	Brigadier	Raghubir Singh	Indian Army	1965 Operation Riddle	07-Sep-1965
101	Lieutenant Colonel	Harbans Lal Mehta	Indian Army	1965 Operation Riddle	08-Sep-1965
102	Naib Subedar	Naubat Ram	Indian Army	1965 Operation Riddle	08-Sep-1965
103	Brigadier	Thomas Krishnan Theogaraj	Indian Army	1965 Operation Riddle	08-Sep-1965
104	Major General	Mohindar Singh	Indian Army	1965 Operation Riddle	09-Sep-1965
105	Brigadier	Sampuran Singh	Indian Army	1965 Operation Ablaze	09-Sep-1965
106	Major General	Salim Caleb	Indian Army	1965 Operation Riddle	10-Sep-1965
107	Major General	Madan Mohan Singh Bakshi	Indian Army	1965 Operation Riddle	11-Sep-1965
108	General	Arun Shridhar Vaidya	Indian Army	1965 Operation Riddle	16-Sep-1965
109	Major	Asa Ram Tyagi	Indian Army	1965 Operation Ablaze	21-Sep-1965
110	Captain	Kapil Singh Thapa	Indian Army	1965 Operation Riddle	21-Sep-1965
111	Brigadier	Pagadala K Nandagopal	Indian Army	1965 Operation Riddle	28-Sep-1965
112	Subedar	Tika Bahadur Thapa	Indian Army	1965 Operation Riddle	30-Sep-1965
113	Major	Bhupinder Singh	Indian Army	1965 Operation Riddle	11-Oct-1965
114	Naik	Darshan Singh	Indian Army	1965 Operation Riddle	02-Nov-1965
115	Captain	Gautam Mubayi	Indian Army	1965 Operation Riddle	02-Nov-1965
116	Brigadier	Sant Singh	Indian Army	1965 Operation Riddle	02-Nov-1965
117	Major	Harbhajan Singh	Indian Army	1967 Indo-China War	11-Sep-1967
118	Brigadier	Rai Singh Yadav	Indian Army	1967 Indo-China War	11-Sep-1967
119	Lieutenant Colonel	Mahatam Singh	Indian Army	1967 Indo-China War	01-Oct-1967
120	Lieutenant General	Anand Sarup	Indian Army	1971 Indo-Pakistan War	01-Jan-1971
121	Brigadier	Arun Bhimrao Harolikar	Indian Army	1971 Indo-Pakistan War	01-Jan-1971
122	Major General	Anthony Harold Edward Michigan	Indian Army	1971 Indo-Pakistan War	01-Jan-1971
123	Major General	Hardev Singh Kler	Indian Army	1971 Indo-Pakistan War	01-Jan-1971
124	Captain	Mohan Narayan Rao Samant	Indian Navy	1971 Indo-Pakistan War	01-Jan-1971
125	Brigadier	Rajkumar Singh	Indian Army	1971 Indo-Pakistan War	01-Jan-1971
126	Lieutenant Colonel	Surinder Kapur	Indian Army	1971 Indo-Pakistan War	01-Jan-1971
127	Lance Naik	Ram Ugrah Pandey	Indian Army	1971 Indo-Pakistan War	24-Nov-1971
128	Sepoy	Ansuya Prasad	Indian Army	1971 Indo-Pakistan War	30-Nov-1971
129	Rifleman	Pati Ram Gurung	Indian Army	1971 Indo-Pakistan War	30-Nov-1971
130	Lieutenant Colonel	Shamsher Singh	Indian Army	1971 Indo-Pakistan War	01-Dec-1971
131	Vice Admiral	Swaraj Parkash	Indian Navy	1971 Indo-Pakistan War	01-Dec-1971
132	Major	Anup Singh Gahlaut	Indian Army	1971 Indo-Pakistan War	03-Dec-1971
133	Brigadier	Basdev Singh Mankotia	Indian Army	1971 Indo-Pakistan War	03-Dec-1971
134	Major General	Anant Vishwanath Natu	Indian Army	1971 Indo-Pakistan War	03-Dec-1971
135	Major General	Kashmiri Lal Rattan	Indian Army	1971 Indo-Pakistan War	03-Dec-1971
136	Major General	Prem Kumar Khanna	Indian Army	1971 Indo-Pakistan War	03-Dec-1971
137	Lieutenant Colonel	Jaivir Singh	Indian Army	1971 Indo-Pakistan War	03-Dec-1971
138	Air Vice-Marshal	Vidya Bhushan Vasisht	Indian Air Force	1971 Indo-Pakistan War	03-Dec-1971
139	Group Captain	Allan Albert D’Costa	Indian Air Force	1971 Indo-Pakistan War	04-Dec-1971
140	Subedar Major	Bir Bahadur Pun	Indian Army	1971 Indo-Pakistan War	04-Dec-1971
141	Commodore	Kasargod Patnashetti Gopal Rao	Indian Navy	1971 Operation Trident	04-Dec-1971
142	Brigadier	K Gowrishankar	Indian Army	1971 Indo-Pakistan War	05-Dec-1971
143	Brigadier	Hardev Singh Kler	Indian Army	1971 Indo-Pakistan War	---Dec-1971
144	General	Arun Shridhar Vaidya	Indian Army	1971 Indo-Pakistan War	05-Dec-1971
145	Commodore	Babru Bhan Yadav	Indian Navy	1971 Operation Trident	05-Dec-1971
146	Captain	Devinder Singh Ahlawat	Indian Army	1971 Indo-Pakistan War	05-Dec-1971
147	Lieutenant General	Krishnaswamy Gowri Shankar	Indian Army	1971 Indo-Pakistan War	05-Dec-1971
148	Brigadier	Kuldip Singh Chandpuri	Indian Army	1971 Indo-Pakistan War	05-Dec-1971
149	Brigadier	Narinder Singh Sandhu	Indian Army	1971 Indo-Pakistan War	05-Dec-1971
150	Wing Commander	Padmanabha Gautam	Indian Air Force	1971 Indo-Pakistan War	05-Dec-1971
151	Air Marshal	Ravinder Nath Bhardwaj	Indian Air Force	1971 Indo-Pakistan War	05-Dec-1971
152	Lieutenant Colonel	Sawai Bhawani Singh	Indian Army	1971 Indo-Pakistan War	05-Dec-1971
153	Lieutenant General	Joginder Singh Gharaya	Indian Army	1971 Indo-Pakistan War	06-Dec-1971
154	Brigadier	Kailash Prasad Pande	Indian Army	1971 Indo-Pakistan War	06-Dec-1971
155	Brigadier	Mohindar Lal Whig	Indian Army	1971 Indo-Pakistan War	06-Dec-1971
156	Sepoy	Pandurang Salunkhe	Indian Army	1971 Indo-Pakistan War	06-Dec-1971
157	Air Vice-Marshal	Chandan Singh	Indian Air Force	1971 Indo-Pakistan War	07-Dec-1971
158	Lieutenant Colonel	Chittoor Venugopal	Indian Army	1971 Indo-Pakistan War	07-Dec-1971
159	Lieutenant General	Joginder Singh Bakshi	Indian Army	1971 Indo-Pakistan War	07-Dec-1971
160	Subedar Major	Mohinder Singh	Indian Army	1971 Indo-Pakistan War	07-Dec-1971
161	Major	Chewang Rinchen	Indian Army	1971 Indo-Pakistan War	08-Dec-1971
162	Petty Officer	Chiman Singh	Indian Navy	1971 Indo-Pakistan War	08-Dec-1971
163	Commander	Joseph Pius Alfred Noronha	Indian Navy	1971 Indo-Pakistan War	08-Dec-1971
164	Brigadier	Udai Singh Bhati	Indian Army	1971 Indo-Pakistan War	08-Dec-1971
165	Captain	Mahendra Nath Mulla	Indian Navy	1971 Indo-Pakistan War	09-Dec-1971
166	Naik	Sugan Singh	Indian Army	1971 Indo-Pakistan War	09-Dec-1971
167	Brigadier	Rattan Nath Sharma	Indian Army	1971 Indo-Pakistan War	10-Dec-1971
168	Lieutenant Colonel	Harish Chandra Pathak	Indian Army	1971 Indo-Pakistan War	11-Dec-1971
169	Major	Kulwant Singh Pannu	Indian Army	1971 Indo-Pakistan War	11-Dec-1971
170	Brigadier	Sukhjit Singh	Indian Army	1971 Indo-Pakistan War	11-Dec-1971
171	Major	Vijay Rattan Choudhry	Indian Army	1971 Indo-Pakistan War	11-Dec-1971
172	Lance Naik	Drig Pal Singh	Indian Army	1971 Indo-Pakistan War	13-Dec-1971
173	Captain	Pradip Kumar Gour	Indian Army	1971 Indo-Pakistan War	14-Dec-1971
174	Brigadier	Amarjit Singh Bal	Indian Army	1971 Indo-Pakistan War	15-Dec-1971
175	Havildar	Thomas Philipose	Indian Army	1971 Indo-Pakistan War	15-Dec-1971
176	Lieutenant Colonel	Ved Prakash Ghai	Indian Army	1971 Indo-Pakistan War	15-Dec-1971
177	Lieutenant General	Hanut Singh	Indian Army	1971 Indo-Pakistan War	16-Dec-1971
178	Lieutenant General	Raj Mohan Vohra	Indian Army	1971 Indo-Pakistan War	16-Dec-1971
179	Captain	Shankar Shankhapan Walkar	Indian Army	1971 Indo-Pakistan War	16-Dec-1971
180	Air Vice-Marshal	Cecil Vivian Parker	Indian Air Force	1971 Indo-Pakistan War	17-Dec-1971
181	Air Commodore	Harcharan Singh Mangat	Indian Air Force	1971 Indo-Pakistan War	17-Dec-1971
182	Air Vice-Marshal	Madhavendra Banerji	Indian Air Force	1971 Indo-Pakistan War	17-Dec-1971
183	Subedar	Malkiat Singh	Indian Army	1971 Indo-Pakistan War	17-Dec-1971
184	Group Captain	Man Mohan Bir Singh Talwar	Indian Air Force	1971 Indo-Pakistan War	17-Dec-1971
185	Air Commodore	Ramesh Sakharam Benegal	Indian Air Force	1971 Indo-Pakistan War	17-Dec-1971
186	Second Lieutenant	Shamsher Singh Samra	Indian Army	1971 Indo-Pakistan War	17-Dec-1971
187	Lance Naik	Shanghara Singh	Indian Army	1971 Indo-Pakistan War	17-Dec-1971
188	Lance Havildar	Dil Bahadur Chettri	Indian Army	1971 Indo-Pakistan War	21-Dec-1971
189	Rear Admiral	Santosh Kumar Gupta	Indian Navy	1971 Indo-Pakistan War	21-Dec-1971
190	Brigadier	Vijay Kumar Berry	Indian Army	1971 Indo-Pakistan War	28-Dec-1971
191	Air Chief Marshal	S. K. Kaul	Indian Air Force	1971 Indo-Pakistan War	30-Dec-1971
192	Subedar	Nar Bahadur Chhetri	Indian Army	1971 Indo-Pakistan War	31-Dec-1971
193	Colonel	Dharam Vir Singh	Indian Army	1971 Indo-Pakistan War	01-Jan-1972
194	Brigadier	Sant Singh	Indian Army	1971 Indo-Pakistan War	02-Jan-1972
195	Major	Daljit Singh Narang	Indian Army	1971 Indo-Pakistan War	20-Jan-1972
196	Lieutenant General	Ved Prakash Airy	Indian Army	1971 Indo-Pakistan War	20-Jan-1972
197	Assistant commandant	Ram Krishna Wadhwa	BSF	1971 Indo-Pakistan War	10-Dec-1972
198	Lieutenant Colonel	Puttichanda Somaiah Ganapathi	Indian Army	1987 Operation Pawan	16-Oct-1987
199	Brigadier	Manjit Singh	Indian Army	1987 Operation Pawan	19-Oct-1987
200	Lieutenant	Arvind Singh	Indian Navy	1987 Operation Pawan	22-Jan-1988
201	Squadron Leader	Ajjamada B. Devaiah	Indian Air Force	1965 Operation Ablaze	26-Jan-1988
202	Colonel	Krishna Gopal Chatterjee	Indian Army	1987 Operation Rajiv	26-Jan-1988
203	Lance Havildar	Nar Bahadur Ale	Indian Army	1987 Operation Rajiv	26-Jan-1988
204	Naik	Prem Bahadur Gurung	Indian Army	1987 Operation Rajiv	26-Jan-1988
205	Subedar	Sansar Chand	Indian Army	1987 Operation Rajiv	26-Jan-1988
206	Lieutenant Colonel	Inderbal Singh Bawa	Indian Army	1987 Operation Pawan	02-Apr-1988
207	Captain	Pratap Singh	Indian Army	1984 Operation Meghdoot	25-May-1988
208	Second Lieutenant	Rajeev Sandhu	Indian Army	1987 Operation Pawan	19-Jul-1988
209	Colonel	Vijay Kumar Bakshi	Indian Army	1989 Operation Pawan	29-Mar-1989
210	Captain	Anuj Nayyar	Indian Army	1999 Operation Vijay	15-Aug-1999
211	Major	Balwan Singh	Indian Army	1999 Operation Vijay	15-Aug-1999
212	Major	Rajesh Singh Adhikari	Indian Army	1999 Operation Vijay	15-Aug-1999
213	Lieutenant Colonel	Sonam Wangchuk	Indian Army	1999 Operation Vijay	15-Aug-1999
214	Captain	Keishing Clifford Nongrun	Indian Army	1999 Operation Vijay	15-Aug-1999
215	Naik	Digendra Kumar	Indian Army	1999 Operation Vijay	15-Aug-1999
216	Captain	Neikezhakuo Kengurüse	Indian Army	1999 Operation Vijay	15-Aug-1999
217	Major	Padmapani Acharya	Indian Army	1999 Operation Vijay	15-Aug-1999
218	Major	Vivek Gupta	Indian Army	1999 Operation Vijay	15-Aug-1999
219	Sepoy	Imliakum Ao	Indian Army	1999 Operation Vijay	26-Jan-2000
220	Captain	Gurjinder Singh Suri	Indian Army	1999 Operation Vijay	01-Jan-2001
221	Colonel	B. Santosh Babu	Indian Army	2020 Operation Snow Leopard	26-Jan-2021

== Allowances and Benefits provided for the recipients ==
Monetary allowance of ₹ 10,000 per month (enhanced from ₹ 5000 per month in 2017) is sanctioned to recipients irrespective of rank and income. The allowance is admissible to the recipient and upon their death is carried forward to the lawfully married widow. Each and extra bar to the decoration will carry the same amount as admissible to the original award.

Exempt from deduction of Income Tax According to sub-clause (i) of clause (18) of Section 10 of the Income-Tax Act, 1961 (43 of 1961) of 07.02.2014 any Income by way of pension received by an individual who has been in the service of the Central Government or State Government and recipient of Chakra series medal is Exempt from deduction of Income Tax after satisfying himself about the veracity of the claim.

Free Train travel facility Indian Railways issues complementary Railway passes enabling the recipients and their companion to travel from any railway station to any railway station. As mentioned in 18/2014 E(W)2008/PS5-6/8 of 07.02.2014 they are entitled to life long free travel in 1st Ac/ Executive class for self and a companion over all Indian railway trains (except Kolkata metro) inclusive of Rajadhani, Shatabthi and Durunto trains.

Exempted from payment of Toll fee Ministry of Road Transport and Highways (MoRTH) vide National Highways Fee (Determination of Rates and Collection) Rules, 2008 has notified that chakra series gallantry medal recipients are exempted from payment of user fee even if recipient is traveling in personal vehicle, if such awardee produces ID card issued and authenticated by competent authority.

Discount on Air travel through Indian Airlines Recipients of qualifying Level I & II gallantry awards (PVC, MVC, AC, KC) receive a 75% discount on domestic air travel through Indian Airlines based on guidelines issued via Indian Airlines Commercial HQ circulars issued in July 2001 (specifically Letter No. HCD/8R/260, Circular No. 1385/R&T.

State specific grants such as Cash in lieu of land, land, or a one time lump sum grant or monthly annuity are announced as a reward by state governments to the recipients based on their domicile. These vary from ₹1.5 crore (in Andhra Pradesh) to ₹20 to ₹50 lakhs in smaller states.
