= Rattan Nath Sharma =

Decorated senior Indian army officer

Brigadier Rattan Nath Sharma MVC
- Rattan Nath Sharma
- Born: 23 November 1926; Kangra, British Punjab
- Died: 24 December 2011 (aged 85); Noida, Uttar Pradesh, India
- Military career
- Allegiance: India
- Branch: Indian Army
- Service years: 1949–1977
- Rank: Brigadier
- Service number: IC-5270
- Unit: 21st Battalion, Punjab Regiment
- Conflicts: Indo-Pakistani War of 1965; Indo-Pakistani War of 1971
- Awards: Maha Vir Chakra; Mention in dispatches

Brigadier Rattan Nath Sharma, MVC, was an officer in the Indian Army who served with the Punjab Regiment, and was awarded the Maha Vir Chakra, India's second-highest award for gallantry in the face of the enemy. The award was made for his actions during the Indo-Pakistani War of 1971, when he displayed exemplary courage and outstanding leadership while commanding the 21st Battalion, Punjab Regiment, in a successful assault on a fortified Pakistani position near the Poonch River in the Jammu and Kashmir sector of the Western Front. He retired from the army in 1977 as a brigadier, after which he was the chief managing director of the Indian Farmers Fertiliser Cooperative. He died in a vehicle accident in December 2011.

== Early life and family ==
Rattan Nath Sharma was born on 23 November 1926 in Kangra, in the British province of Punjab, the son of Shri Hari Charan Dixit. Prior to joining the Indian Army he attended the D. S. V. High School in Kangra. After finishing school, he briefly worked for the Indian Revenue Service but left after six months when a man tried to bribe him. He was married to Subhash and they had two daughters and one son: Meera, born in 1960; Anita, born in 1963; and Sandeep, born in 1969.

== Military career ==
Sharma was commissioned into the Punjab Regiment on 28 August 1949, and was mentioned in dispatches for his performance during the Indo-Pakistani War of 1965. By the time of the Indo-Pakistani War of 1971, Sharma was a lieutenant colonel, and was commanding officer of the 21st Battalion, Punjab Regiment in the Poonch area in the Jammu and Kashmir sector of the Western Front. On 9 December 1971, Sharma's battalion was tasked with capturing a fortified Pakistan Army position named Nangi Tekri, overlooking the Poonch River. The Pakistani positions were strongly held, dispersed and mutually supporting, but the capture of them was considered critical as they dominated the river and nearby roads.

The assault began the next day, and was met by intense artillery and small arms fire, which slowed progress and caused heavy casualties. Despite this, Sharma encouraged his men to press on, leading them from the front throughout with complete disregard for his personal safety. Over the next two days, the battalion made progress under his cool leadership, and the position was finally captured in fierce hand-to-hand fighting on 12 December. The Pakistani defenders suffered 13 killed, three wounded and one captured in the battle. For his exemplary courage and outstanding leadership during this operation, the Indian government awarded Sharma the Maha Vir Chakra, the second-highest award for gallantry available to members of the Indian Armed Forces. The award was promulgated on Independence Day in 1972.

== Later life ==
Sharma rose to the rank of brigadier before his retirement from the army in 1977, after which he was the chief managing director of the Indian Farmers Fertiliser Cooperative. He lived in Palampur, Himachal Pradesh, and after his retirement from the Indian Farmers Fertiliser Cooperative he worked for social causes, particularly looking after ex-soldiers and the poor. He died on 24 December 2011, as a result of being struck by a speeding vehicle while waiting for a bus. He was cremated with full military honours at his home village of Ghugar.
