= Sant Singh =

Indian military officer (1921–2015)

Brigadier Sant Singh MVC**
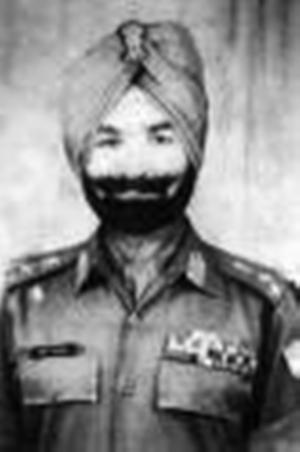
- Born: 12 July 1921; Panjgrain Kalan, Faridkot, Punjab
- Died: 9 December 2015; Sahibzada Ajit Singh Nagar
- Military career
- Allegiance: India; India
- Branch: British Indian Army; Indian Army
- Service years: 16 February 1947 - 1973
- Rank: Brigadier
- Unit: Sikh Light Infantry
- Conflicts: Indo-Pakistani War of 1947; Sino-Indian War; Indo-Pakistani War of 1965; Indo-Pakistani War of 1971
- Awards: Maha Vir Chakra; Bar to Maha Vir Chakra

Brigadier Sant Singh, MVC** (1921–2015) was an officer in the Indian Army. He was one of the six officers of the Indian Army to have been twice decorated with the Maha Vir Chakra, India's second highest war time military decoration. He was one of the Indian officers involved in training the Mukti Bahini, during the Indo-Pakistani War of 1971 and Bangladesh Liberation War. The Bangladeshi freedom fighters fondly called “Brigadier Babaji” because of his attire – typical Sikh turban and beard and affectionate attitude.

== Early life ==
Sant Singh was born in Jat family on 12 July 1921 in Panjgrain Kalan in Faridkot, Punjab. He studied in Brijendra High School, Faridkot and RSD College, Ferozpur.

== Military career ==
Singh was commissioned into the Sikh Light Infantry on 16 February 1947 on a short-service commission, receiving a regular commission in the Indian Army as a lieutenant on 15 August 1951. He took over as the commander of the Sikh Light Infantry in 1964 and led the regiment to victory in the Battle of OP Hill in the Indo-Pakistani War of 1965.

=== MVC citation ===
The citation for the Maha Vir Chakra reads as follows:

Gazette Notification: 70 Pres/66

Date of award: 2 November 1965

CITATION

Lieutenant Colonel SANT SINGH (IC-5479),

The Sikh Light Infantry

On the night of the 2nd/3rd November 1965, Lieutenant Colonel Sant Singh was given the task of clearing an objective which notwithstanding the cease-fire had been encroached upon by Pakistani fortes. This was a difficult feature and strongly defended by the enemy. Despite enemy mines and artillery fire, Lieutenant Colonel Sant Singh moved forward with his men, charged the enemy and, after a bitter hand to hand fight, cleared the objective. Later, taking advantage of his position, Lieutenant Colonel Sant Singh moved from bunker to bunker in the face of heavy enemy artillery and automatic fire encouraging his men and cleared another objective which also had been encroached upon by Pakistani forces.

Throughout, Lieutenant Colonel Sant Singh displayed conspicuous gallantry and leadership of a high order.

He remained as the commander of the regiment till 1968. He was promoted to acting brigadier and given command of an infantry brigade on 28 August 1969. He was also instrumental in training the guerrilla forces of the Mukti Bahini and his brigade marched into Dhaka, after catching the Pakistani forces off guard, and thereby forcing the enemy to surrender.

=== Bar to MVC citation ===
The citation for the Bar to Maha Vir Chakra reads as follows:

Gazette Notification: 22 Pres/72

CITATION

Brigadier SANT SINGH MVC
(IC-5479)

Brigadier Sant Singh, MVC, while commanding a sector on the Eastern Front achieved spectacular results with a mixed force having only one regular battalion, advancing thirty-eight miles almost on loot, to secure Mymensingh and Madhopur in eight days. During this advance, inspite of very stiff opposition from (he enemy, he cleared heavily defended positions at several places. Throughout these actions, Brigadier Sant Singh personally led and directed the troops, exposing himself to enemy Medium Machine Gun fire and shelling. His personal gallantry, leadership, skilful handling of meagre resources, audacity, improvisation and maximum use of local resources were responsible for tho successful and rapid advance against much stronger enemy in well prepared defensive positions. Throughout, Brigadier Sant Singh displayed conspicuous gallantry and inspiring leadership in keeping with the highest traditions of the Army.

On 10 March 1972, Singh was given command of an infantry brigade. He retired on 12 July 1973 after 26 years of service.

== Dates of rank ==
Insignia	Rank	Component	Date of rank
	Second Lieutenant	British Indian Army	16 February 1947
	Second Lieutenant	Indian Army	15 August 1947 (Note: Upon independence in 1947, India became a Dominion within the British Commonwealth of Nations. As a result, the rank insignia of the British Army, incorporating the Tudor Crown and four-pointed Bath Star ("pip"), was retained, as George VI remained Commander-in-Chief of the Indian Armed Forces. After 26 January 1950, when India became a republic, the President of India became Commander-in-Chief, and the Ashoka Lion replaced the crown, with a five-pointed star being substituted for the "pip.")
	Lieutenant	Indian Army	16 August 1948
	Lieutenant	Indian Army	26 January 1950 (short-service commission, recommissioning and change in insignia); 15 August 1951 (regular commission)
	Captain	Indian Army	
	Major	Indian Army	16 February 1960
	Lieutenant-Colonel	Indian Army	2 February 1966
	Colonel	Indian Army	17 December 1970
	Brigadier	Indian Army	28 August 1969 (acting); 22 May 1972 (substantive)

== Personal life ==
Sant Singh was married to Satwant Kaur.

He has a daughter Satinder Kaur married to Brigadier Sarbjit Singh Randhawa (Retired).

He has one Grand Daughter Sukhdeep Kaur Randhawa married to Amarjit Singh Mundi

He also has a Grand Son Manvir Singh Randhawa Founder and CTO at www.ayamveda.com
