= Vijay Rattan Choudhry =

Indian Army soldier

Major Vijay Rattan Choudhry (9 July 1939 – 11 December 1971), was a soldier who served in the 9 Engineers Regiment of the Indian Army. He was an alumnus of The Lawrence School, Sanawar. He was posthumously awarded the Maha Vir Chakra for bravery displayed in the Indo-Pak war of 1971.

== Early life ==
Choudhry was born in present-day Ambala, Haryana, on 9 July 1939.

== Award of Maha Vir Chakra ==
Major Vijay Rattan Choudhary commanding 405 Fd Company of 9 Engineer Regiment was in charge of minefield clearance of Chakra on the western front. The safe lanes had to be made with great speed to enable tanks and anti tank weapons to reach Chakra, which was in imminent danger of a counterattack by Pakistan armor. With utter disregard for his personal safety, Major Vijay Rattan Choudhary personally supervised the operation, inspiring and motivating his men to their optimum efficiency. Throughout the advance, from 5 December onwards, he displayed exemplary devotion to duty and was responsible for clearance of minefields of 1000-1500 yards depth at Thakurdwara, Lohara and Basantar river. While supervising the minefield lane near Basantar river this gallant officer was killed due to enemy artillery fire.

Major Vijay Rattan Choudhary's exceptional devotion to duty, extraordinary bravery, inspiring leadership and supreme sacrifice were in the highest traditions of the Indian Army.

=== Other Honors ===
To honor his bravery, the Municipal Corporation of Ambala subsequently named one of the main crossroads at the Ambala Cantonment, Saddar Bazaar after him, now called 'Vijay Rattan Chowk'. At this junction three Busy roads meet namely Railway Road, Rai market and Durga Charan Road.
