= Padmanabha Gautam =

Indian Air Force officer (1933–1972)

Wing Commander Padmanabha Gautam MVC**, VM
- Born: 23 July 1933; Chennai, Tamil Nadu, India
- Died: 25 November 1972 (aged 39); Pune, Maharashtra
- Military career
- Allegiance: India
- Branch: Indian Air Force
- Service years: 1953-1972
- Rank: Wing Commander
- Service number: 4482
- Units: No. 5 Squadron IAF; Jet Bomber Conversion Unit (JBCU); No. 16 Squadron IAF
- Conflicts: Congo Crisis; Indo-Pakistani War of 1965; Indo-Pakistani War of 1971
- Awards: Maha Vir Chakra & Bar; Vayu Sena Medal (Gallantry)

Wing Commander Padmanabha Gautam, MVC & Bar, VM (23 July 1933 – 25 November 1972) was an officer in the Indian Air Force. He was awarded the India's second-highest war-time gallantry award, the Maha Vir Chakra twice. Awarded during the Indo-Pakistani War of 1965 and the Indo-Pakistani War of 1971, Gautam is one of only six officers to have been decorated with the Maha Vir Chakra twice.

== Early life and education ==
Gautam was born on 23 July 1933 in Chennai, Tamil Nadu to Neelkanta Padmanabha.

== Military career ==
Gautam was commissioned into the Indian Air Force on 1 April 1953. In 1961, he served as a Flight Lieutenant which as deployed in Congo and was awarded the Vayu Sena Medal for his service. On 25 November 1972, he died in an air-crash due to internal bleeding. The engine of his MIG-21FL flamed shortly after take-off and he was forced to crash land.

== Maha Vir Chakra ==
The citation for the first Maha Vir Chakra awarded to him reads:

Gazette Notification: 126 Pres/65,22-9-65

Operation: Operation Riddle, Date of Award: 6 September 1965

Citation: Squadron Leader P. Gautam, Commanding Officer of a bomber conversion-training unit led it in a number of difficult and dangerous missions. He undertook six important offensive and tactical close-support operations over Pakistani territory during the period from 6 to 21 September 1965. In complete disregard of personal safety in the face of heavy enemy ground fire and of the risk of attack by Pakistani Sabrejets, he carried out his missions successfully with courage and determination. These missions included reconnaissance deep into enemy territory and the bombing of Akwal and Gujarat airfields and enemy troops concentrations in the Gujarat and Chawinda areas.

Throughout the operations, Squadron Leader P Gautam's devotion to duty, professional skill and gallantry were in the finest traditions of the Air Force.

The citation for the second Maha Vir Chakra awarded to him reads:

Gazette Notification: 22 Pres/72,12-2-72

Operation: 1971 Cactus Lily Date of Award: 5 December 1971

Citation:

Commander P/ Gautam, Commanding Officer of a bomber squadron, led many missions deep into enemy territory. Notable among these were two raids on the night of the 5 and 7 December 1971 when Wing Commander Gautam led attacks on the Mianwali airfield. On both these occasions, he and his formation were met with intense anti-aircraft fire. Despite that, the target was attacked with great precision, at low level and heavy damage was inflicted. On the other missions, he carried out rocket and four gun attacks on railway marshalling yards in the Montgomery-Raiwind area with conspicuous success. Throughout the operation, Wing Commander Gautam displayed conspicuous gallantry, exemplary flying skill and leadership in the highest traditions of the Air Force.
