= Meghna Heli Bridge =

Aerial operation by the Indian Air Force during the Bangladesh Liberation War of 1971

Operation Cactus Lilly
- Part of Bangladesh Liberation War and Indo-Pakistani war of 1971
- Mi-4 of IAF mounting troops in Brahmanbaria on 9 December 1971.
Date	9–12 December 1971
Location	Ashuganj, East Pakistan
Result	Indian operational success; Successful crossing of the Meghna River

Belligerents
India Supported By: Bangladesh	Pakistan

Commanders and leaders
Lt Gen Sagat Singh, GOC IV Corps Maj. Gen. Gonsalves, GOC 57th Mountain Division Brigadier R. N. Mishra, CO 311 Mountain Brigade Group Captain Chandan Singh	Maj. Gen. Q. A. M. Khan, GOC 14th Infantry Division Brigadier Saadullah Khan, CO 27 Infantry Brigade Brigadier Iftikhar Rana

Units involved
311 Mountain Brigade: 4 Guards; 18 Rajput; 10 Bihar; 19 Raj Rif (on 11 Dec); 15 Engineer Regt.; 73 Mountain Brigade: 14 Guards; 19 Punjab; 9 Madras; Indian Air Force units attached to IV Corps: 14 x Mi-4 helicopters under Group Captain Chandan Singh	313 Infantry Brigade: 22 Baluch; 30 Frontier Force; 27 Infantry Brigade: 6 x M24 Chaffee light tanks; 33 Baluch; 12 Frontier Force; 12 Azad Kashmir

Strength
Total; ~6,000 First Phase; ~1,800 Second Phase: Air Assault: 656; Amphibious: 800–1,000	First and Second Phase ~6,000

Casualties and losses
First Phase: Battle of Ashuganj: 4 tanks destroyed; 44 KIA; 92 WIA; Second Phase: Air Assault: None (neither side claims Indian casualties)	First Phase: Battle of Ashuganj; Indian Claim: 23 KIA; Pakistani Claim: 1 x platoon destroyed; Second Phase: Air Assault; Indian Claim: ~3,000 POWs Pakistani Claim; 27 Infantry Brigade "rendered benign"

Operation Cactus Lilly, better known as The Meghna Heli Bridge or the Crossing of the Meghna, was an air assault operation conducted between 9 and 12 December 1971 during the Indo-Pakistani War of 1971. It was conducted by the Indian Army and Indian Air Force to cross the Meghna River, bypass a Pakistani stronghold at Ashuganj/Bhairab Bazar and reach Dhaka. The operation is generally regarded as the brainchild of Maj. Gen. (later Lt. Gen.) Sagat Singh. Without it, Indian forces would not have been able to complete the encirclement of Dhaka and it would likely have led to a lengthening of the war.

== Background ==
=== Advance of 57th Mountain Division ===
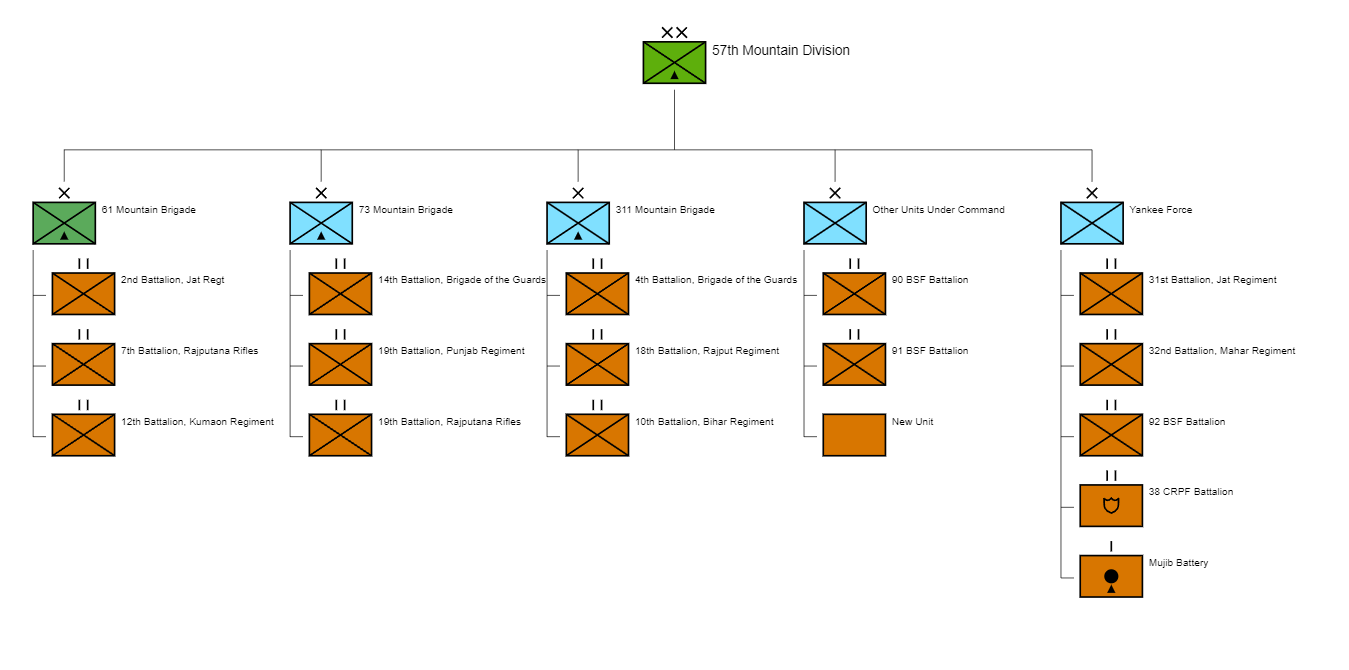
ORBAT of the 57th Mountain Division

The 57th Mountain Division had been given the task of advancing on Dhaka from the East and North East. On 5 December, the 57th captured its first objective, the Pakistani fortified town of Akhaura. From here, they were supposed to advance to the town of Daudkani and then Feni, however IV Corps redirected the division to attack and seize Brahmanbaria. This was done to cut off the Pakistani 202nd and 313th Infantry Brigades in Sylhet which had come under pressure from the advance of other IV Corps units further north of Sylhet. Then, the objective of the 57th became to secure the eastern bank of the Meghna and capture Bhairab Bazar on the western bank before advancing on Dhaka.

=== Capture of Brahmanbaria ===
73 Mountain Brigade, under the 57th, was given the task of capturing Brahmanbaria. 73 Mtn Bde, along with assistance from the maneuver elements of 311 Mtn Bde (namely, 14 Guards) enveloped Brahmanbaria by 7 December. Elements of the Pakistan 27th Infantry Brigade, noting that they had been enveloped, chose to withdraw from Brahmanbaria. This was also due in part to the CO of the 27th, Brigadier Saadullah Khan, ordering a general retreat to the fortified positions at Ashuganj. With Brahmanbaria now captured with no resistance, the next target of the 57th became Ashuganj.

== Orders of battle ==
=== Indian Army ===
During the advance from Brahmanbaria to Ashuganj, and the air assault operation that followed, the order of battle was thus:

==== 73 Mountain Brigade ====
- 14th Battalion, Brigade of the Guards
- 19th Battalion, Punjab Regiment
- 19th Battalion, Rajputana Rifles (Raj Rif) (until 11 Dec)

==== 311 Mountain Brigade ====
- 4th Battalion, Brigade of the Guards
- 18th Battalion, Rajput Regiment
- 10th Battalion, Bihar Regiment
- 19th Battalion, Rajputana Rifles (detached from 73 Mtn Bde and attached to 311 Mtn Bde on 11 Dec)
- 15 Engineer Regiment

=== Indian Air Force ===
The Indian Air Force had attached multiple helicopter units to the various Indian Army offensive corps before the war. The role of these units was to ferry supplies and assist the Corps Commanders in attaining their objective. The 2 helicopter units, under Group Captain Chandan Singh that performed this air assault were as follows:

==== 105 Helicopter Unit ====
- 7 x Mi-4s

==== 110 Helicopter Units ====
- 7 x Mi-4s

=== Pakistan Army ===
Defending against Lt. Gen. Sagat Singh's IV Corps was the Pakistan Army's 14th Infantry Division. Defending Ashuganj and Bhairab Bazar would only be the 27th Infantry Brigade. Its order of battle was thus:

==== 27 Infantry Brigade ====
- 6 x M24 Chaffee Light Tanks
- 33rd Battalion, Baluch Regiment
- 12th Battalion, Frontier Force

==== 313 Infantry Brigade ====
- 22nd Battalion, Baluch Regiment
- 30th Battalion, Frontier Force

== Objectives ==
=== First phase ===
The objective for the 57th Mountain Division in what became the first phase on their advance across the Meghna were as follows, in the order that follows:

1. Capture Ashuganj
2. Capture and cross Coronation Bridge
3. Capture Bhairab Bazar
4. Advance toward Dhaka

=== Second phase ===
As the Pakistanis, while withdrawing from Ashuganj demolished Coronation Bridge, rendering it unusable, the objectives – for what became the second phase – were as follows, in the order that follows:

==== 4 Guards, 311 Mtn Bde ====
1. Land at Raipura
2. Advance toward Narsingdi
3. Capture railway bridge at Narsingdi

==== 73 Mtn Bde ====
1. Use civilian fishing boats to cross Meghna under cover of darkness
2. Advance toward Bhairab Bazar and surround it
3. 19 Rajputana Rifles to link up with 4 Guards at Narsingdi

Following this, the 57th was to begin the advance on Dhaka.

== First phase ==
=== Battle of Ashuganj ===
What became, effectively, the "First Phase" of the Meghna Crossing, was the advance to Ashuganj. The advance was spearheaded by 73 Mtn Bde, supported by tanks from 63 Cavalry. However, the Pakistani 27 Infantry Brigade had turned Ashuganj into a fortress. The spearhead of 18th Battalion, Rajput Regiment and 10th Battalion, Bihar Regiment, supported by a squadron of PT-76s from 63 Cavalry reached the outskirts of Ashuganj at 1300hrs on 9 December. They arrived to find that the bridge had already been blown up ahead of the arrival of Indian troops and a significant force of the Pakistani 27 Infantry Brigade was camped at Ashuganj to defend it. In the fighting, 44 Indian soldiers were killed, 4 PT-76s destroyed, as against 29 Pakistani soldiers. However, by the morning of the 10th, the Pakistanis had retreated from Ashuganj on the last remaining boats to Bhairab Bazar.

== Second phase ==
=== 9 December – air assault ===
It had become clear to Gen. Sagat Singh by 7 December, that an air assault operation would be required to cross the Meghna. Inspired by the airlift/air assault operations that had surrounded Sylhet between 6 and 9 December, he ordered plans to be drawn up for a similar operation to cross the Meghna. The engineers of 15 Engineer Regiment and Group Captain Chandan began to plan the operation. They identified possible landing grounds and, with the help of the Mukti Bahini, began to mark them with modified torches. Mukti Bahini fighters set up these modified torches in paddy fields at Raipura (the DZ) in the hours before the helicopters landed. At 1300hrs on the 9th, as 18 Rajpur and 10 Bihar entered Ashuganj, 4 Guards was recalled from the lines at Ashuganj to the stadium at Brahmanbaria. Sometime in the evening, they began to board Mi-4 helicopters bound for Raipura. According to Major Chandrakant Singh, an officer in 4 Guards at the time, the 14 Mi-4s were escorted by 2 Folland Gnat fighters and landed at their DZ without any issue.

The Mi-4s had had to land, in the pitch dark, on dimly lit fields. As such, upon landing, Flying Officer D. S. Shaheed got out and began to mark the DZ with wheat flour. At the time, there was a fear that the two brigades of the Pakistani 14th Inf Div at Bhairab Bazar would spot the landings and overwhelm 4 Guards before they'd had a chance to regroup. However, no such counterattack materialised. By 4 am, the helicopters had conducted about 50-60 sorties and had moved all ~700 men of 4 Guards, along with an artillery battery from 82 Light Regiment, to Raipura. After the war, it was revealed by Pakistani POWs that – upon hearing the sound of helicopters – it was assumed that an entire Indian brigade had been landed to their rear and as such, they were not allowed to move out of Bhairab Bazar.

=== 9 December – 19 Punjab crosses the Meghna ===
At the same time as 4 Guard was moving, 19 Punjab had moved further south on the eastern bank of the Meghna to the village of Charlalpur. From here, using commandeered civilian fishing boats, they crossed the Meghna under cover of darkness, with the entire battalion having crossed within a few hours. They immediately moved to surround the Pakistani forces at Bhairab Bazar, as there were fears of an imminent Pakistani attack on 4 Guards.

=== 10–11 December – advance on Narsingdi ===
4 Guards had reorganised and regrouped by 0400hrs, following the landings at Raipura. After patrols had scouted out Pakistani positions on the road to Narsingdi, 4 Guards began their attack on Narsingdi railway bridge. Their objective was to keep the Pakistani defenders occupied and unable to detonate the explosives on the bridge. By the end of the day, the battalion had secured a river crossing point on the western bank of the Meghna and had captured the railway bridge at Narsingdi. It materialised that the Pakistanis had left behind only 1 platoon of paramilitary to defend Narsingdi, with the Army moving across the Lakhya River to bolster the defence of Dhaka. As such, 4 Guards faced no casualties and wiped out or captured the platoon with ease.

As 4 Guards was fighting in Narsingdi, the Mi-4s were carrying out multiple sorties to land 10 Bihar at Raipura. From there, 10 Bihar (along with a battery of medium artillery which was also landed) moved west to assist in the capture of Narsingdi. Simultaneously, on the 11th, 19 Raj Rif had been crossing the Meghna on boats and linked up with 4 Guards by midday, being transferred into 311 Mountain Brigade.

=== 12 December – advance towards Dhaka ===
With 27 and 313 Infantry Brigades successfully isolated at Bhairab Bazar, the entirety of 311 Mountain Brigade would be airlifted into Raipura by the 14 Mi-4s which flew over 200 sorties between 9 and 13 December. By 0800hrs, 4 Guards – the forwardmost unit of 311 Mountain Brigade – was only 12 kilometers short of Dhaka. They encountered Pakistani positions on the east of the Lakhya River, but these were quickly overwhelmed. By the end of the 12th, 311 Mountain Brigade was within artillery range of Dhaka.

== Aftermath ==
Operation Cactus Lilly, combined with the success of the Tangail Airdrop and its consequences, meant that the Indian Army had reached the gates of Dhaka by 12 December. As Lt. Gen. A. A.K. Niazi realised that Dhaka was surrounded, he and the then Governor of East Pakistan, began the diplomatic process of organising a ceasefire and then a surrender. Due to this, the Indian Army's forward units received the order to advance on Dhaka slowly, to give the Pakistanis time to surrender. Regardless, the Indian Army's first heavy artillery reached artillery range by 14 December. On the same day, the Indian artillery began a bombardment of Dhaka Cantonment and the Pakistani positions at Dhaka. By the 16th, the war was over and the Pakistani forces would sign an unconditional surrender.

== Popular culture ==
Hindustan Ki Kasam a Hindi war movie directed by Chetan Anand and released in 1973 was based on the incidents of Operation Cactus Lilly.

== See also ==
- Battle of Basantar
- Battle of Longewala
- Battle of Turtuk
- Battle of Sylhet
- Battle of Hilli
- Battle of Tangail
- Timeline of the Bangladesh Liberation War
- Military plans of the Bangladesh Liberation War
- Mitro Bahini order of battle
- Pakistan Army order of battle, December 1971
- Evolution of Pakistan Eastern Command plan
- 1971 Bangladesh genocide
- Operation Searchlight
- Indo-Pakistani wars and conflicts
