= Ikkis =

2026 Indian film by Sriram Raghavan

- Theatrical release poster
- Directed by: Sriram Raghavan
- Written by: Sriram Raghavan; Arijit Biswas; Pooja Ladha Surti
- Produced by: Dinesh Vijan; Binny Padda; Sharada Karki Jalota; Poonam Shivdasani
- Starring: Agastya Nanda; Dharmendra; Jaideep Ahlawat; Simar Bhatia
- Cinematography: Anil Mehta
- Edited by: Monisha R. Baldawa
- Music by: Songs: White Noise Collectives; Score: Sachin–Jigar
- Production company: Maddock Films
- Distributed by: Jio Studios (India); Yash Raj Films (International)
- Release date: 1 January 2026
- Running time: 147 minutes
- Country: India
- Language: Hindi
- Budget: ₹60 crore
- Box office: est. ₹36.95 crore

Ikkis (transl. Twenty One) is a 2026 Indian Hindi-language biographical war drama film directed and co-written by Sriram Raghavan. It is co-produced by Dinesh Vijan, Binny Padda, Sharada Karki Jalota, and Poonam Shivdasani under Maddock Films. It stars Agastya Nanda, Dharmendra, Asrani, Jaideep Ahlawat and Simar Bhatia. This also marks the final film appearance of Dharmendra. It is based on the life of Arun Khetarpal, the youngest recipient of the Param Vir Chakra award, and centered around the Battle of Basantar during the 1971 India–Pakistan War. The film's title is in reference to the age at which Arun Khetarpal was killed in action.

Initially scheduled for a theatrical release on 25 December 2025, it was later postponed to 1 January 2026. The film received positive reviews from critics but underperformed at the box-office.

== Plot ==
The film chronicles the events in the life of 2nd Lieutenant Arun Khetarpal and eventually his martyrdom in the Battle of Basantar during the 1971 India Pakistan War. It also depicts the events that happen when his father, Brigadier Madan Lal Khetarpal (retd), visits Pakistan 30 years later. On 14 October 1971, at a training camp in Ahmednagar, officers celebrate 2nd Lt. Arun Khetarpal's 21st birthday while it is announced that training is cancelled due to increasing tension at the border. Time shifts to 2001 in Lahore, Pakistan, where Brigadier Jaan Mohammed Nisar prepares for the arrival of Madan Lal Khetarpal, Arun's father, who is staying for a college reunion and to visit his village, Sargodha. Time shifts back and forth and show Arun's biography, including falling in love with a girl named Kiran Kochar, being a tank commander, going to Pakistan on 3 December 1971 (the day Prime Minister Indira Gandhi declared war on Pakistan), being mistaken for the Pakistani army by civilians, fighting against over 14 Patton tanks, and ultimately breathing his last (which is later revealed that it was caused by Nisar himself). It also shows ML Khetarpal visiting the spot where his son died. In the end, it is revealed that Kiran still sends a birthday cake to Arun's family, although she broke up with Arun in June 1971.

== Cast ==
- Agastya Nanda as 2nd Lt. Arun Khetarpal, PVC
- Dharmendra as Brigadier Madan Lal Khetarpal (retd), Arun's father
- Jaideep Ahlawat as Brigadier Jaan Mohammad Nisar, Pakistan Army officer (based on Brigadier Khwaja Mohammed Naseer)
- Jitendar Singh as Sowar Nand Singh
- Shree Bishnoi as Sowar Parag Singh, MD, the driver of Arun's 'Famagusta' tank
- Vijendar Singh as ALD Nathu Singh, MD
- Madhusudan Bishnoi as Sowar Bishwanath Singh, MD
- Suhasini Mulay as Maheshwari Khetarpal, Arun Khetarpal's mother
- Sikander Kher as Risaldar Sagat Singh
- Rahul Dev as Lt. Col. Hanut Singh, MVC, commanding officer of 2nd Lt. Arun Khetarpal
- Vivaan Shah as Capt. Vijendra Malhotra "Mallu"
- Deepak Dobriyal as Jahangir, a disabled soldier from the Kargil War living in Sargodha
- Kailash Gowthaman as 2nd Lt. Brijendra Singh "Brij"
- Aryan Pushkar as 2nd Lt. Avtar Singh Ahlawat
- Simar Bhatia as Kiran Kochhar
- Ekavali Khanna as Mrs. Maryam Nisar
- Aadyanshi Kapoor as a family member
- Guneet Sandhu as Mukesh Khetarpal, Arun Khetarpal's younger brother
- Mohan Godara
- Asrani as Mr. Asghar
- Pragati Anand as Kiran's friend
- Mamik Singh as Pakistani General
- Zakir Hussain as ISI officer
- Adil Ibrahim as Major P. V. Sahadevan
- Abhishek Duhan as Major Hoshiyar Singh
- Avani Rai as Saba
- Saurabh Dubey as Pakistani General
- Amit Jairath as Lt. Col. Ajai Singh
- Baharul Islam as Capt. Zafar
- Mathlub Khan as a Golfer
- Vijender Poniyal as Paresh Kamdaar
- Abhijeet Singh as Capt. Siraj, 13 Lancer

== Production ==
=== Development ===
The film was produced by Dinesh Vijan's Maddock Films and Binny Padda, alongside Sharada Karki Jalota, Keval Shah, Antara Banerjee, Naved Farooqui, and Poonam Shivdasani. The film has been co-written by Sriram Raghavan, Arijit Biswas, and Pooja Ladha Surti. It was in the pipeline since 2019 when it was first announced on Arun Khetarpal's 69th birth anniversary and was supposed to go on floors in 2020 but was delayed due to the COVID-19 pandemic in India. The film has been shot across various locations in North India. The film has a poem titled Aj vi ji karda hai, pind apne nu jaanwa, which has been written and orated by late actor Dharmendra himself. Agastya Nanda who plays Arun Khetarpal underwent a strict regimen as the role required a strict fitness requirement.

=== Casting ===
The film was first announced in 2019 on 69th anniversary of Arun Khetarpal's birth, with Varun Dhawan originally cast in the lead role. After COVID-19, Dhawan couldn't do the film due to date scheduling issues. A new cast was announced on 8 December 2022, the 87th birthday of Dharmendra, retaining only him in the role of the father Madan Lal Khetarpal, newcomer Agastya Nanda was cast in the role of Arun Khetarpal and Akshay Kumar's niece debutant Simar Bhatia was finalised as the female lead. Jaideep Ahlawat was cast as Pakistan Army officer Jaan Mohammad, the character is based on Khwaja Mohammed Naseer, who confessed to Arun's father that he was the man who pulled the tank's trigger that killed his son in the Battle of Basantar. Sikandar Kher, who plays Risaldar Sagat Singh joined the cast in February 2025. Shree Bishnoi, a Rajasthani actor who plays Sowar Parag Singh as the driver of Arun's tank 'Famagusta' also joined the cast on 15 October 2024. Comedy icon Asrani who died late last year was also cast in a small role. Vijay Ganguly has been roped in as the choreographer for the film. Sujeet Subhash Sawant and sriram Kannan Iyengar did the production design of the film, Bishwadeep Chatterjee was roped in for sound designing and Amrit Singh with Alexander Samokhvalov are responsible for action sequences.

=== Filming ===
The film was shot across various locations in North India. During shooting sequences Dharmendra, for better understanding, improvised and rewrote his dialogues in Urdu and other actors cues as well. He was eager to watch the complete film but managed to see only about 50 percent in post-production rushes. During the filming, the late actor had recorded a message that 'India and Pakistan' must see the film. This Behind the Scene message was shared by the production team on his 90th birthday on 8 December 2025. During filming of the song 'ikkis' Dharmendra despite his advanced age used to stay awake till early morning to complete the song. Agastya Nanda who plays Arun Khetarpal underwent a strict regimen as the role required a strict fitness requirement. To prepare for the role, Nanda did extensive training for 2–3 years at the Indian Army and Poona Horse regiment, followed by National Defence Academy at Khadakwasala, Pune. Later, he went to Aurangabad, where he did tank training for a few days. As the film is based on a tank war involving Centurion tanks, that dont exist except as showpieces, the filmmakers recreated 3 Centurion tanks from scratch to film the tank battle. Production designer Sujeet Subhash Sawant and Sriram Kannan Iyengar designed and executed the exterior and interior of tanks, period Punjab villages as set and army camps. Even though special effects have been used in the film, the tank war sequences were shot in actual locations like marshlands and rivers. Each of these 3 tanks weighed 4 to 5 tons and where built to move in proper speed. The production designers also created 2 dummy Centurion tanks for filming long shots. These tanks were built over a period of 3 to 6 months. A major chunk of film's budget was spent to build these tanks.

=== Post production ===
Sachin-Jigar as part of the post production work provided the background score for the film while Biswadeep Chatterjee did the sound mixing. This is the first Sriram Raghavan film which saw an extensive use of visual effects (VFX) in post-production, to enhance the overall cinematic experience. The late actor Dharmendra struggled during dubbing sessions in October 2025. Bobby Deol, son of Dharmendra, gave the voice-over to the younger version of his father's character to add authenticity to the film and has been given a special thanks in the end credits.

== Soundtrack ==
The film's soundtrack is composed by White Noise Collectives, with lyrics written by Amitabh Bhattacharya. The album accompanying five-tracks—four of them being preceded as singles—was released under the Sony Music label on 1 January 2026.

== Marketing ==
The first look poster featuring Agastya Nanda as Arun Khetarpal was released on 14 October 2025 on Khetarpal's birth anniversary. During the filming, Dharmendra recorded a message that "India and Pakistan" must see the film. This behind the scenes message was shared by the production team on his 90th birthday on 8 December 2025. The film was promoted in a special episode of Kaun Banega Crorepati season 17. Agastya Nanda, his mother Shweta Bachchan Nanda, and his sister Navya Naveli Nanda featured as the guests in the show which is hosted by Agastya's maternal grandfather Amitabh Bachchan. IGP, a global direct-to-consumer gifting platform, partnered with Maddock Films to create a limited-edition co-branded planter inspired by Khetarpal’s values of bravery, resilience, and duty. Each planter has artwork, a self-watering pot, a hardy snake plant, and soil from the Arun Khetarpal memorial at The Lawrence School, Sanawar as a living tribute to Arun Khetarpal’s legacy.

A special screening of the film was held in New Delhi on 23 December 2025. The event was attended by the production team of the film, family members of Arun Khetarpal and family members of his tank crew. Also present at the event were Defence Minister Rajnath Singh, Chief of Defence Staff General Anil Chauhan, Chief of Army Staff General Upendra Dwivedi, and other Indian Army personnel and their families. At the event Singh felicitated the family members of Khetarpal and his tank crew. A day before, a private screening of the film was held in Bombay, which was attended by the film's crew as well Amitabh Bachchan, Abhishek Bachchan, Akshay Kumar and his sister (mother of Simar Bhatia). On 29 December 2025, Sunny Deol and Bobby Deol hosted a special screening of the film at PVR ICON in Andheri, Mumbai as a tribute to their father Dharmendra.

== Release ==
=== Theatrical ===
The film originally planned for a release on 2 October 2025, but was postponed to 25 December 2025 (around the 54th anniversary of Arun Khetarpal's death), mainly to avoid a clash with Kantara: Chapter 1 as well as to make use of the Christmas holiday season. It was further postponed to 1 January 2026, becoming the first film to release in 2026. The release was postponed due to astrological reasons, as per Amitabh Bachchan the grandfather of Agastya Nanda. CBFC gave a U/A 13+ certificate to the film and asked for several modifications. These included blurring alcohol names, adding a smoking warning, removing a tank name, removing a 15-second dialogue on India–Pakistan relations and the addition of certain voice-overs and end-credit changes. The film released in over 4000 screen across India. Yash Raj Films distributed the film overseas.

=== Pre-release business ===
Despite the week long delay due to astrological reasons, the film Ikkis has registered a slow start in advance booking on Wednesday, with only around 30 thousand tickets sold. This resulted in business of around est.₹ 2 crore for opening day of 1 January 2026. This is mainly due to the continued buzz around the film Dhurandhar.

=== Home media ===
The film began streaming on Amazon Prime Video from 26 February 2026.

== Reception ==
=== Critical reception ===
On the review aggregator website Rotten Tomatoes, 100% of 10 critics' reviews are positive, with an average rating of 7.2/10.

Saibal Chatterjee of NDTV gave 3.5 stars out of 5 and said that "Not the sort of Bollywood war movie that goes all guns blazing and tom-tomming the virtues of battlefield bellicosity, Ikkis conserves its firepower and spreads it out judiciously over its two-and-a-half-hour runtime."

Shubhra Gupta of The Indian Express rated it 3/5 stars and writes in her review that "Agastya Nanda-Dharmendra-starrer is a war film that makes you feel in a way that movies these days are not either able to or want to. It eschews gratuitous violence and jingoism as it explores the harrowing fallout of conflict."

Rahul Desai of The Hollywood Reporter India commented that "The first Hindi film of 2026 excels as both a patriotic war drama and a poignant anti-war epic. ... Come for the heroism, stay for the hugs."

Mayur Sanap of Rediff.com rated it 3.5 stars out of 5 and observed that "Where Dhurandhar leaned into aggressive bloodlust through its acerbic storytelling, Ikkis moves in the opposite direction, asking us to see people beyond uniforms, slogans, or sides."

Rishabh Suri of Hindustan Times also gave 3.5 stars out of 5 and stated that "Overall, Ikkis works best when it stops trying to be a war film and becomes a painful reminder. It tells you something unbearable: that our freedoms were bought by people who never got to live theirs."

Anuj Kumar of The Hindu said that "Ikkis succeeds as a thoughtful, tear-jerking homage to a young warrior that values soul over spectacle."

Nandini Ramnath of Scroll.in writes that "Ikkis sidesteps the vengeance-fuelled hyperbole that results when Indians run into Pakistanis. Scene after scene reveals Raghavan’s efforts to put his own stamp on a genre that has been lost to jingoism."

A critic of Bollywood Hungama gave 4 stars out of 5 and said that "Ikkis is not just a war film. It is a deeply human story about courage, sacrifice and reconciliation".

Lachmi Deb Roy of Firstpost also rated 4/5 stars and said that "Ikkis is just the kind of war-drama we need in this ruptured mainstream cinema scenario."

Devesh Sharma of Filmfare also rated 4/5 stars and said that "Sriram Raghavan doesn’t just direct a war drama; he offers an actor a graceful goodbye, and reminds us that the truest war stories are those that mourn what is lost rather than celebrate what is won."

Uday Bhatia of Mint praise the film saying that "In an increasingly belligerent and hysterical Hindi cinema, I’m not sure there'll be takers for Ikkis' pacifism. Those who watch it for the director might be surprised. There was a lot of talk when the trailer released about how this didn't seem like a Raghavan film, which is to say something acidic, smart and self-aware. It's true that sweet, sincere Ikkis is tonally apart from anything he's made."

Renuka Vyavahare of The Times of India gave 3.5 stars and said that "Unlike most war films, Ikkis doesn’t glorify conflict; it strives for realism. There’s no heavy reliance on CGI or dramatic sound design, which largely works in the film’s favour. However, the music is underwhelming and does little to elevate the narrative or emotional beats."

=== Box office ===
Ikkis collected est.₹7.28 crore on its opening day, despite facing stiff competition from Dhurandhar (2025). As of 22 January 2026, after end of 3rd week, the film has grossed est. ₹ 36.89 crore.
