= Ikkis (soundtrack) =

- Soundtrack album cover

Soundtrack album by White Noise Collectives
- Released: 1 January 2026
- Recorded: 2024–2025
- Genre: Feature film soundtrack
- Length: 16:58
- Language: Hindi
- Label: Sony Music
- Producer: White Noise Collectives

White Noise Collectives chronology
Housefull 5 (2025)	Ikkis (2026)
External audio
- Official Audio Jukebox on YouTube

Ikkis is the soundtrack album to the 2026 Hindi-language biographical war drama film of the same name directed by Sriram Raghavan, based on the life of 2nd Lt. Arun Khetarpal, the youngest recipient of the Param Vir Chakra award. The film stars Agastya Nanda as Khetarpal, along with Dharmendra, Jaideep Ahlawat and Simar Bhatia.

The soundtrack is composed by White Noise Collectives while the lyrics for the songs were written by Amitabh Bhattacharya and Irshad Kamil. It was preceded by four singles, before the album released on 1 January 2026.

== Background ==
Sachin–Jigar composed the film score, while their music production and artist collaborative company White Noise Collectives, had been credited for the soundtrack. The album featured five songs with lyrics written by Amitabh Bhattacharya and Irshad Kamil as the songwriters. Agastya Nanda noted that music played a major role in shaping the performances as besides supporting the film, it becomes part of the characters which led the album being memorable.

== Release ==
The first single "Sitaare" was launched on 3 December 2025 at an event held in Mumbai; the song was sung by Arijit Singh with lyrics by Amitabh Bhattacharya. The second single "Ban Ke Dikha Ikkis" was released on 9 December 2025. During the filming of the song Dharmendra despite his advanced age used to stay awake till early in the morning to complete it. The third song "Tera Aashiq" was released on 22 December 2025. The fourth single "Sajda" was launched on 26 December, at an event in Mumbai. The soundtrack was released on 1 January 2026, under the Sony Music India label, the same day as the film.

== Track listing ==
No.	Title	Singer(s)	Length
1.	"Sitaare"	Arijit Singh	2:56
2.	"Tera Aashiq"	Master Saleem, Madhubanti Bagchi	4:08
3.	"Sajda"	Vishal Mishra, Asees Kaur	4:21
4.	"Ban Ke Dikha Ikkis"	Jasmine Sandlas	2:53
5.	"Biraadar Yamma Yamma"	Divya Kumar, Sumonto Mukherjee	2:35
Total length:			16:58

== Non-album singles ==
A tribute song for the film, titled "Ham Fouji Hain" was released on 25 November 2025 on YouTube by Maddock Music. The song has lyrics written by Vaibhav and music composition by Rooh. The voice was generated through AI. On 28 November 2025, in an ode to the recently deceased actor Dharmendra, the filmmakers released a poem titled "Ikkis Poem", written and orated by Dharmendra himself.

No.	Title	Lyrics	Music	Singer(s)	Length
1.	"Ham Fouji Hain"	Vaibhav	Rooh	AI-generated vocals	3:56
2.	"Ikkis Poem"	Dharmendra	Dharmendra	Dharmendra	1:02

== Reception ==
Renuka Vyavahare of The Times of India said, "the music is underwhelming and does little to elevate the narrative or emotional beats". Anuj Kumar of The Hindu called the music "subtle and restrained". Shoma A Chatterjee of Mathrubhumi added "There are too many songs that at times, become disturbing because of the high decibels." Sakshi Salil Chavan of Outlook wrote "The score remains measured, with silence often carrying the greatest weight, though select sequences could have benefited from more nuanced musical emphasis." Bollywood Hungama wrote "White Noise Collectives’ songs – ‘Sitaare’, ‘Tera Aashiq’, ‘Sajda’ and ‘Biraadar Yamma Yamma’– don’t fully click. However, they are placed well though a song in the second half, played when the battle track has commenced in full force, could have been avoided. White Noise Collectives’ background score, on the other hand, works far better."

== Personnel ==
- Music composed, produced and recorded by: White Noise Collectives
- Music production head: Romil Ved
- Programming and arrangements: Hrishikesh Gangan, Amrit Sharma, Abhishek Singh
- Chorus: Hrishikesh Gangan, Abhishek Singh, Sabri Brothers, Hitesh Purani, Noor Parmar
- Live dholak: Raju Salvi
- Live drums: Darshan Doshi
- Live guitars: Kalyan Baruah, Indrajit Chetia
- Live harmonium: Akhlakh Khan
- Live piano: Rinku Rajput
- Live trumpets: Robin Fargose
- Live violins and viola: Jitendra Jawda
- Guitar: Rhythm Shaw, Noor Parmar
- Bass: Rhythm Shaw
- Backing vocals: Shruti Dhasmana
- Recording engineer: Susmeet Rewaskar, Swar Mehta
- Mixing and mastering: Eric Pillai
- Assistant mixing: Michael Edwin Pillai
