= IGP =

IGP can refer to:

- IGP, online gifting retailer in India
- The Immediate Gratification Players, a Harvard University improvisational comedy troupe
- Indian Gandhiyan Party, a political party in Kerala, India
- Indication géographique protégée (protected geographical indication), food certification of the European Union
- Indication géographique protégée (Switzerland), food certification of Switzerland
- Inspector General of Police, a high rank of police officer; in some countries the highest rank
- Inspector General of Nepal Police, the highest rank of law enforcement agencies and paramilitary force in Nepal.
- Integrated graphics processor, a graphics processing unit
- Interior gateway protocol, an Internet protocol between routers
- Intraguild predation, an ecological concept describing predatory interactions between competing species
- Inverse Galois problem, an open problem in mathematics
