= Hanut Singh (soldier) =

Indian Army officer (1933–2015)

Lieutenant General Hanut Singh Rathore PVSM MVC
- Born: 6 July 1933; Jasol, Jodhpur State, Rajputana, British India
- Died: 10 April 2015 (aged 81); Dehradun, Uttarakhand, India
- Military career
- Allegiance: India
- Branch: Indian Army
- Service years: 1952–1991
- Rank: Lieutenant General
- Nicknames: "Huntie"; "Gurudev"
- Service number: IC-6126
- Unit: The Poona Horse
- Commands: II Corps; 1st Armoured Division; 17th Infantry Division; 14 (I) Armoured Brigade; The Poona Horse
- Conflicts: Indo-Pakistani War of 1971; Battle of Basantar
- Awards: Param Vishisht Seva Medal; Maha Vir Chakra

Lieutenant General Hanut Singh Rathore, PVSM MVC(6 July 1933 – 10 April 2015) was an Indian General Officer. He was a recipient of India's second highest military decoration, the Maha Vir Chakra, for his role in the Battle of Basantar during the Indo-Pakistani War of 1971.

War memorial in memory of Lt Gen Hanut Singh at Jasol

== Early life ==
Hanut Singh was born in Jasol in a Mahecha Rathore Rajput family in Balotra district to Lt Col Arjun Singh, who had served in the Jodhpur Lancers, and later commanded the Kachhawa Horse. He attended the Colonel Brown Cambridge School in Dehradun and joined the 1st course of the (jsw) Joint Services Wing. where he was in the Baker squadron. Singh had three sisters younger than him. His eldest sister's son, Colonel Shambhoo Singh Deora, SM, also followed in his footsteps and joined the army and was part of 10 Para Special Forces, and his son Major Ajmal Singh is now serving with 15 Rajputana Rifles. Jaswant Singh the former Minister was Singh's first cousin.

== Military career ==
Upon graduating from the Indian Military Academy in December 1952, he chose to join the Armoured Corps, and was commissioned into The Poona Horse.

He did not participate in the Indo-Pakistani War of 1965 as he was posted as the brigade major of the 66th Brigade.

Hanut is widely known for his command of The Poona Horse in the Indo-Pakistani War of 1971, during the Battle of Basantar. For his conduct during the battle, he was awarded the Maha Vir Chakra.

=== Maha Vir Chakra ===
The citation for the Maha Vir Chakra reads as follows:

Gazette Notification: 18 Pres/72,12-2-72

Operation: 1971 Cactus Lily Date of Award: 16 Dec 1971

CITATION

LIEUTENANT COLONEL HANUT SINGH

(IC-6126), 17 HORSE

Lieutenant Colonel Hanut Singh was commanding 17 Horse in Shakargarh Sector of the Western Front. On 16 December 1971, his regiment was inducted into the Basantar River bridgehead and took up positions ahead of the infantry. The enemy launched a number of armoured attacks in strength on 16 and 17 December. Undeterred by enemy medium artillery and tank fire, Lieutenant Colonel Hanut Singh moved from one threatened sector to another with utter disregard for his personal safety. His presence and cool courage inspired his men to remain steadfast and perform commendable acts of gallantry.

Second Lieutenant Arun Khetarpal, also from Hanut's regiment, was posthumously awarded the Param Vir Chakra for the same battle.

Hanut was promoted to major general on 8 April 1983, and to lieutenant general on 30 December 1985. He subsequently commanded II Corps during Operation Brasstacks, when India almost went to war with Pakistan.

He is the only indian soldier whose bravery and valour was appreciated by Pakistan by giving him the title Fakhr-e-Hind after 1971 war.

== Post-retirement ==
Upon retirement, he chose to live in Dehradun, to spend the rest of his life reading books and meditating in Shiv Balyogi Ashram dedicating his life to meditation. He died 11 April 2015 during a meditation session at the Ashram. The Indian Army announced plans for the construction of a war memorial in his memory, which will come up in Jasol.

== Military Awards ==

| Param Vishisht Seva Medal | Maha Vir Chakra | | Samar Seva Medal |
| Paschimi Star | Raksha Medal | Sangram Medal | Sainya Seva Medal |
| 25th Independence Anniversary Medal | 30 Years Long Service Medal | 20 Years Long Service Medal | 9 Years Long Service Medal |

== In popular culture ==
Lt Gen Hanut Singh was popular with his rajput style moustache. His famous quote in battlefield was "There's no armoured commander in the army who can visualise a battlefield beyond the regimental level". A famous quote was made by Lt. Gen. Hanut Singh when he was passed over for the position of Army Chief, is, "If they don't want me, the loss is theirs".

In the Param Vir Chakra TV series his character was played in the episode of 2nd Lt Arun Khetarpal, PVC. In the 2026 film Ikkis, actor Rahul Dev has portrayed his character.
