= Thomas Philipose =

Recipient of Maha Vir Chakra

Havildar Thomas Philipose MVC
- Born: 8 July 1942; Travancore, British India
- Died: 9 June 2018 (aged 75); Pathanamthitta, Kerala, India
- Military career
- Allegiance: India
- Branch: Indian Army
- Rank: Havildar
- Unit: 16 Madras
- Conflicts: Indo-Pakistani War of 1971; Battle of Basantar
- Awards: Maha Vir Chakra

Thomas Philipose (8 July 1942 – 9 June 2018) was a havildar (sergeant) in the Madras Regiment during the Indo-Pakistani War of 1971.

During the 1971 war, the Madras Regiment was tasked to capture Lalial and Sarajchak, prior to establishing a bridgehead across the river Basantar, in the Battle of Basantar. Enemy minefields covered the entire area and the Pakistani infantry was well entrenched in the area. Pakistani observation posts kept a close watch over Indian movement.

Undaunted, the Madras Regiment attacked Lalial on 16 December. When the platoon commander and several others were wounded, Havildar Philipose took charge. Accompanied by only 15 men, the havildar led a fierce attack and secured Lalial. The enemy soon regrouped for a second attack.

Philipose and his men, however rushed at the advancing enemy with fixed bayonets, Philipose was hit by a bullet but he kept going. The ferocity of the charge unnerved the Pakistanis and they began retreating. A stray bullet hit Philipose again, but he held on grimly till the battle was won. He was honored by being awarded with the Mahavir Chakra for his steadfastness and courage.
