= Amarjit Singh Bal =

Indian military officer (1940–2010)

Brigadier Amarjit Singh Bal MVC
- Born: 6 June 1940
- Died: 6 November 2010 (aged 70)
- Military career
- Allegiance: India
- Branch: Indian Army
- Rank: Brigadier
- Unit: 17 Horse
- Conflicts: India–Pakistan war of 1971; Battle of Basantar
- Awards: Maha Vir Chakra

Brigadier Amarjit Singh Bal, MVC was an officer of the Indian Army, who served with the 17 Horse. He was awarded the Maha Vir Chakra, India's second highest award for gallantry in the face of the enemy, during the Battle of Basantar in the Indo-Pakistani War of 1971.

== Military career ==
During the Indo-Pakistani War of 1971 Brigadier Amarjit Singh Bal held the rank of Major. Major Amarjit Singh Bal's, unit was deployed on the western front in the Shakargarh Sector. During the Battle of Basantar on 15 and 16 December 1971, he was commanding a tank squadron of 17 Lancers and was tasked to defend a bridgehead on the Basantar river. Located at Jarpal, overlooking the river, his squadron was highly in a highly fortified position. His highly fortified position was attacked by Pakistani troops once but Maj. Amarjit Singh Bal inspired his men to successfully repel the Pakistani attacks.

In the battle, Major Amarjit Singh Bal displayed conspicuous gallantry and outstanding leadership and was awarded the Maha Vir Chakra, India's second highest award for gallantry in the face of the enemy.

Major Amarjit Singh Bal later rose to the rank of Brigadier.

== See also ==
- Indo-Pakistani War of 1971
- Battle of Basantar
