= Muhib Rasool =

Pakistani volleyball player

Personal information
- Nickname: Muhib
- Born: Barapind, tehsil Shakargarh, district Narowal, Punjab, Pakistan
- Hometown: Barapind

Volleyball information
- Position: Middle Blocker
- Current club: Pakistan Police

National team
| Pakistan |

Muhib Rasool (Urdu: محب رسول) is a Pakistani national volleyball player, born in the village of Barapind, tehsil Shakargarh, district Narowal, Punjab, Pakistan. He is serving in the Pakistan Police. He represented Pakistan at the Asian junior volleyball championship in Tehran on September 21, 2006.
