= Arun Khetarpal =

Decorated Indian army officer (1950–1971)

Second Lieutenant Arun Khetarpal PVC
- Born: 14 October 1950; Pune, Maharashtra
- Died: 16 December 1971 (aged 21); Barapind, Punjab, Pakistan
- Education: National Defence Academy; Indian Military Academy
- Military career
- Allegiance: India
- Branch: Indian Army
- Service years: 1971 (6 months)
- Rank: 2nd Lieutenant
- Service number: IC-25067
- Unit: 17th Poona Horse
- Conflicts: Indo-Pakistan War of 1971; Battle of Basantar †
- Awards: Param Vir Chakra (posthumous)

Second Lieutenant Arun Khetarpal, PVC (14 October 1950 – 16 December 1971) was an Indian army officer and a Tank commander, who is recognized as the Indian tank ace of aces, credited with 10 confirmed tank kills. A posthumous recipient of India's highest military decoration, the Param Vir Chakra, which he was awarded for his valour in face of the enemy. He was killed in action in the Battle of Basantar during the Indo-Pakistan War of 1971 where his actions earned him the PVC. Khetarpal's life and military career were covered in the biopic Ikkis (2026).

== Early life ==
Arun Khetarpal was born in Pune, Maharashtra on 14 October 1950 to a Punjabi Hindu family. His family belonged to Sargodha in western Punjab and had migrated to India after partition as refugees. His father Lt Col (later Brigadier) M. L. Khetarpal was an officer serving in the Indian Army's Corps of Engineers. His family traced a long history of military service, with his grandfather having fought in WW1 and great-grandfather having served in the Sikh Khalsa Army.

Attending St. Columba's School, Delhi and The Lawrence School, Sanawar, he distinguished himself both as an able student and sportsman and was the school prefect. Khetarpal joined the National Defence Academy in June 1967. He belonged to Foxtrot Squadron where he was the Squadron Cadet Captain of the 38th Course. Under his watch, Foxtrot Squadron became the champions. His NDA No was 7498/F/38. He subsequently went on to join the Indian Military Academy. In his final term at the Indian Military Academy, he was given the privilege of carrying the President's colours. On 13 June 1971, Khetarpal was commissioned into the 17 Poona Horse.

== 1971 War ==
During the Indo-Pakistan War of 1971, the 17 Poona Horse was assigned to the command of the 47th Infantry Brigade of the Indian Army. Through the duration of the conflict, the 47th Brigade saw action in the Shakargarh sector in the Battle of Basantar.

== Battle of Basantar ==
Among the tasks set for the 47th Brigade was to establish a bridgehead across the River Basantar. By 21:00 hours on 15 December, the brigade had captured its objectives. However, the area was extensively mined, which prevented the early deployment of the tanks of the Poona Horse, and the engineers clearing the mines were only halfway through their work when Indian troops at the bridge-head reported heavy and alarming enemy armour movement, requesting immediate armour support. At this critical juncture, the 17 Poona Horse decided to push through the minefield despite the risks. The regiment successfully linked up with the infantry at the bridge-head by first light the following day.[10]

=== Unsung crew members ===
Independent veteran testimonies and recent defence reportage highlight the contributions of several lesser-known tank crewmen who supported the armoured operations during the Battle of Basantar. Modern accounts identify Sowar Parag (Prayag) Singh, Sowar Nand Singh and Sowar Nathu Singh of Hodson’s Horse (4th Horse) among the soldiers who played significant operational roles alongside the troop that included 2nd Lt. Arun Khetarpal during the critical stages of the engagement.

According to these reports, Parag Singh provided rapid assessments of enemy tank positions, visibility conditions and local terrain, which contributed to the situational awareness of the troop. Sowar Nand Singh and Sowar Nathu Singh, operating in adjacent supporting tanks, are noted for maintaining coordinated fire, relaying movement cues and holding their positions under intense incoming fire as Pakistani armour attempted multiple thrusts toward the bridgehead.

The report notes that all three crewmen continued their support roles until their tanks were disabled by direct hits during the height of the battle. Although their actions do not appear prominently in official gallantry citations, independent war correspondence places Parag Singh, Nand Singh and Nathu Singh among the “unsung crewmen” whose efforts formed an integral component of the broader armoured resistance at Basantar.

=== Bridge-head ===
At 08:00 hours on 16 December, Pakistani armour launched the first of their counter-attacks under the cover of a smokescreen at the pivot of the 17th Poona Horse at Jharpal. At 08:00 hours, the Pakistani 13th Lancers, equipped with the then state-of-the-art US-made 50 ton Patton tanks, relaunched the first of their counter-attacks under the cover of a smokescreen at 'B' Squadron, The Poona Horse, at Jharpal. Its squadron commander urgently called for reinforcements. Arun Khetarpal, who was in 'A' squadron and was stationed close by with his Centurion tank troops, responded with alacrity, as did the rest of his regiment. The first counter-attack was decimated by accurate gunnery, coolness by Indian tank troops and individual tank commanders from the CO, Lt Col Hanut Singh down to its troop leader, Arun Khetarpal. The 13th Lancers desperately launched two more squadron-level counter-attacks and managed to achieve a breakthrough.

Khetarpal rushed to meet the Pakistani armour and launched right into the Pakistani attack. With his troop, he was able to run over the enemy advance with his tanks. However, the commander of the second tank was killed in this attack. Alone in the charge, Khetarpal continued his attack on the enemy strongholds. Disappointed by his failure so far, he desperately attacked the incoming Pakistani troops and tanks, knocking out a Pakistani tank in the process. However Pakistani forces regrouped and counter-attacked. In the ensuing tank battle, Lt. Arun Khetarpal with his 2 remaining tanks bravely fought off and destroyed 10 Pakistani Patton tanks before he was shot and killed in action.

=== Death ===
The skirmish however took its toll on the lieutenant as he was hit by enemy fire, but instead of abandoning the tank, he fought on, thus destroying one final tank before he was finally overwhelmed. However, his actions had denied a vital breakthrough for Pakistani forces and instead put the Indians in a stronger position in the Shakargarh bulge. His final words over the radio to a superior officer who had ordered him to abandon his burning tank were,

"No, Sir, I will not abandon my tank. My main gun is still working and I will get these bastards."

— Arun Khetarpal

Then he set about destroying the remaining enemy tanks. The last enemy tank which he shot was barely 100 metres from his position. At this stage, his tank received a second hit and he was seriously injured. The officer met his death trying to deny the Pakistani Army its desired breakthrough.

Khetarpal's body and his tank, named "Famagusta", were later captured by Pakistan and eventually returned to the Indian military. This tank is on display in India now.

For his conspicuous bravery and extreme gallantry in the face of fierce and unrelenting attacks and assaults by the enemy (the Pakistani military), Khetarpal was honoured with India's most-prestigious and highest-standard military medal for courage and gallantry, the Param Vir Chakra, posthumously.

Arun Khetarpal's body was cremated on 17-December near Samba district and his ashes were sent to his family, who were unaware of his death until 26 December.

The crew of the Famagusta was Sowar Prayag Singh (the driver), Sowar Nand Singh (the radio operator), Sowar Nathu Singh (the gunner) and 2nd/Lt. Arun Khetarpal, the tank's commander. Nand Singh was first casualty (killed in action; KIA) when the tank was fatally hit in the final encounter with Pakistani Army Major Nasser's Patton tank. Arun was the second one to be killed after he sustained severe injuries when his tank was knocked out and eventually succumbed to his wounds. Both Prayag Singh and Nathu Singh were also badly wounded but survived and were captured by Pakistani troops who seized the Famagusta.

== Param Vir Chakra Citation ==
The Param Vir Chakra citation on the Official Indian Army Website reads as follows:

CITATION

SECOND LIEUTENANT ARUN KHETARPAL POONAHORSE (IC-25067)

On 16 December 1971, the Squadron Commander of 'B' Squadron, the Poona Horse asked for reinforcement as the Pakistani Armour which was superior in strength, counter attacked at Jarpal, in the Shakargarh Sector. On hearing this transmission, Second Lieutenant Arun Khetarpal who was in 'A' Squadron, voluntarily moved along with his troops, to assist the other squadron. En route, while crossing the Basantar river, Second Lieutenant Arun Khetarpal and his troops came under fire from enemy strong points and RCL gun nests that were still holding out. Time was at a premium and as critical situation was developing in the 'B' Squadron sector, Lieutenant Arun Khetarpal, threw caution to the winds and started attacking the impending enemy strong points by literally charging them, overrunning the defence works with his tanks and capturing the enemy infantry and weapon crew at pistol point. In commander of his troop was killed. Second Lieutenant Arun Khetarpal continued to attack relentlessly until all enemy opposition was overcome and he broke through towards the 'B' Squadron position, just in time to see the enemy tanks pulling back after their initial probing attack on this squadron. He was so carried away by the wild enthusiasm of battle and the impetus of his own headlong dash that he started chasing the withdrawing tanks and even managed to shoot and destroy one. Soon thereafter, the enemy reformed with a squadron of armour for a second attack and this time they selected the sector held by Second Lieutenant Arun Khetarpal and two other tanks as the points for their main effort. A fierce tank fight ensured ten enemy tanks were hit and destroyed of which Second Lieutenant Arun Khetarpal was severely wounded. He was asked to abandon his tank but he realised that the enemy though badly decimated was continuing to advance in his sector of responsibility and if he abandoned his tank the enemy would break through, he gallantly fought on and destroyed another enemy tank. At this stage, his tank received a second hit which resulted in the death of this gallant officer.

Second Lieutenant Arun Khetarpal was dead but he had, by his intrepid valour saved the day; the enemy was denied the breakthrough he was so desperately seeking. Not one enemy tank got through.

Second Lieutenant Arun Khetarpal had shown the best qualities of leadership, tenacity of purpose and the will to close in with the enemy. This was an act of courage and self-sacrifice far beyond the call of duty.

== Legacy ==
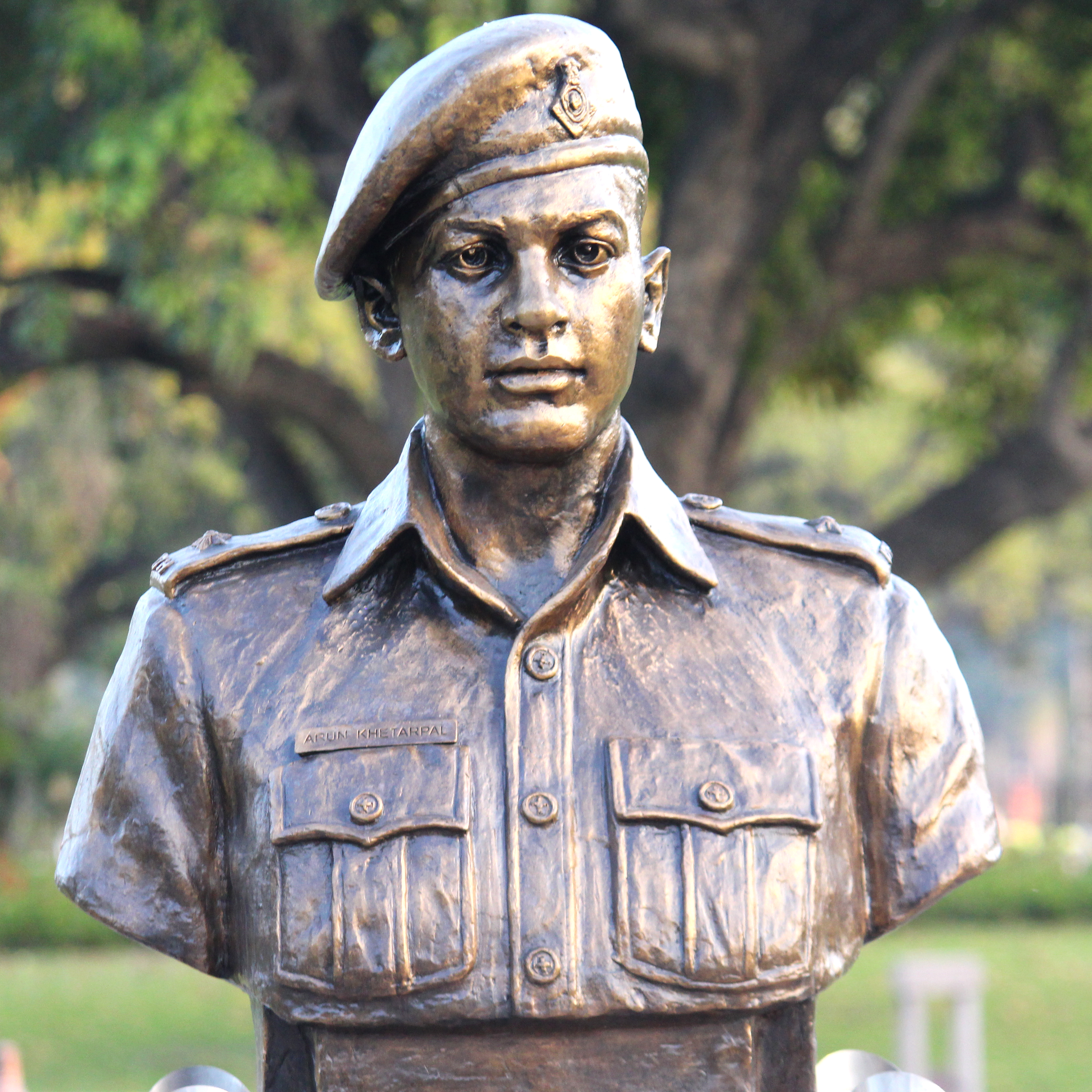
Khetarpal's statue at Param Yodha Sthal, National War Memorial, New Delhi

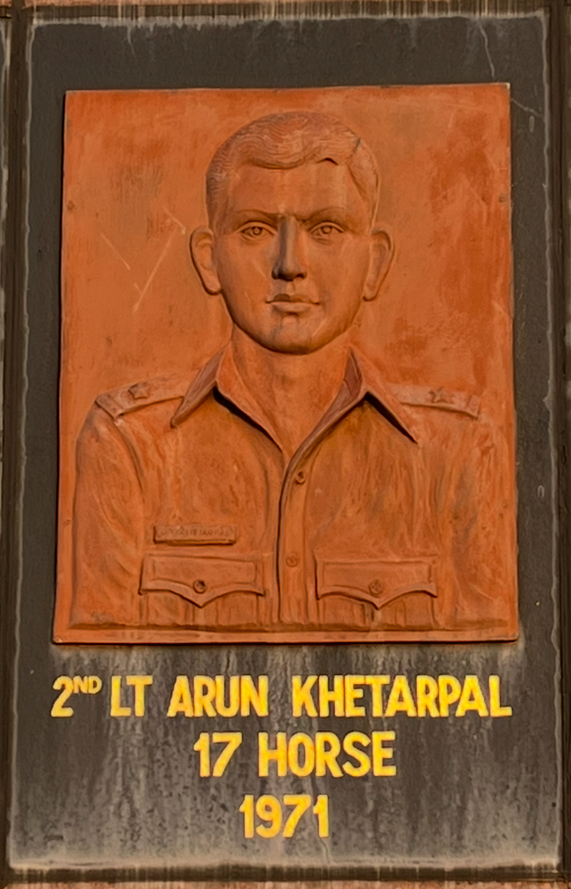
Relief Mural at Balidan Stambh, Jammu

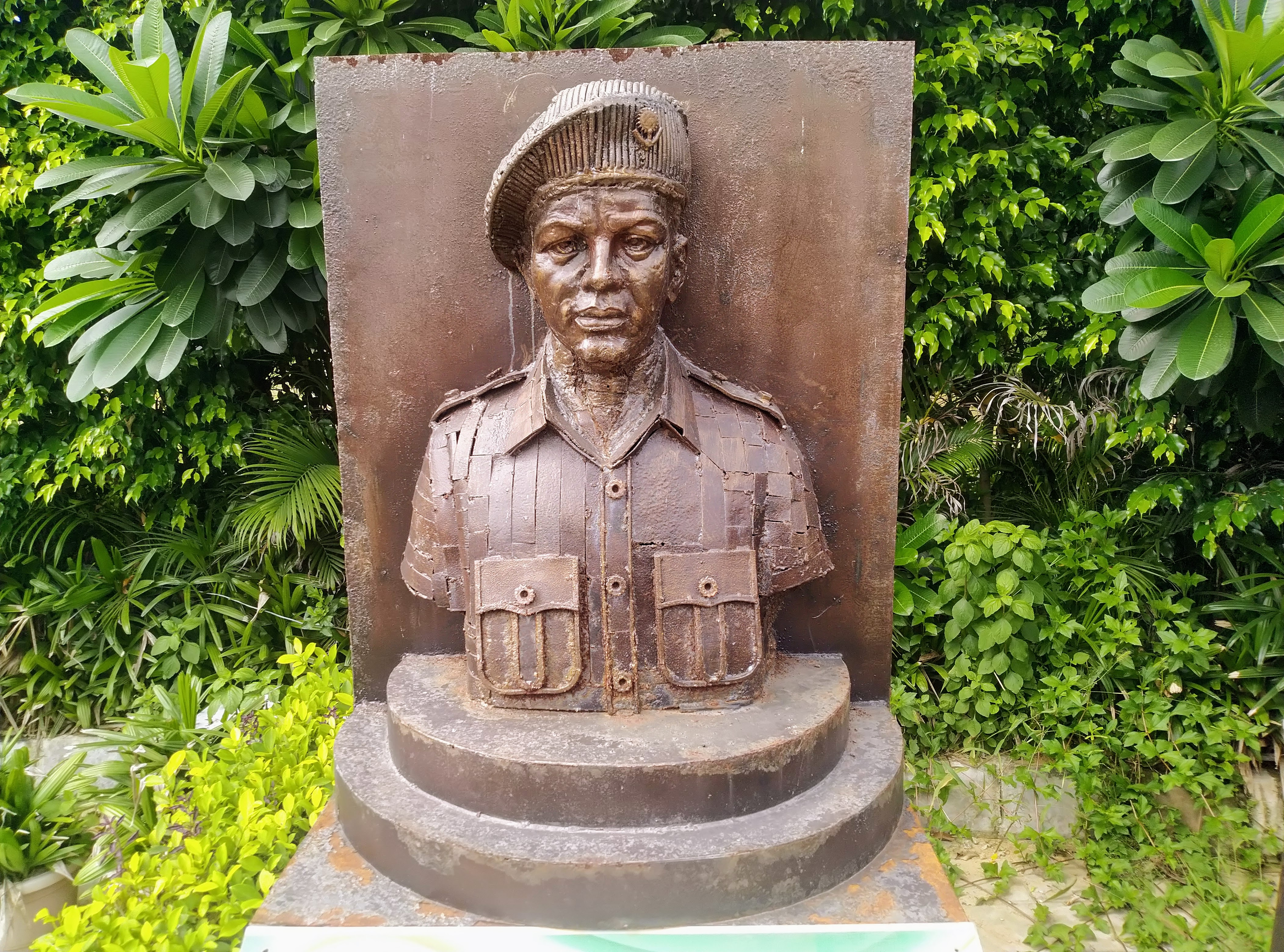
Sculpture of Arun Khetarpal in Shaheedi Park, Delhi

Balidan Stambh, the war memorial in Jammu in 2009 paid tribute to him by inscribing his name on the pillars erected in semi circumference for the martyrs of the 1971 war. His name is displayed near the eternal flame and as relief mural on the semi circumference wall with the Param Vir Chakra awardees who attained martyrdom in Jammu and Kashmir.

"The only occasion when a breakthrough could have occurred was when two squadrons of 13 Lancers attacked together in the afternoon, but a gallant last ditch lone stand by 2/Lt Arun Khetarpal of Poona Horse averted the danger."

— Maj AH Amin (Retd) (Pakistan Armoured Corps – Columnist and Historian)

The Commander of the Pakistan tank battalion is said to have met the Indian battalion commander after the battle and made enquiries about 2nd Lieutenant Khetarpal's tank since he was very impressed with the gallantry of this particular tank's commander.

In 2001, Brigadier M. L. Khetarpal wanted to visit his birthplace at Sargodha, now in Pakistan. At Lahore airport, Brigadier M. L. Khetarpal was met by Brigadier Khwaja Mohammad Naser, who became Brigadier M.L. Khetarpal's host and guide.

Brigadier M. L. Khetarpal was overwhelmed by the extreme kindness, deference, courtesy and respect bestowed upon him by Brigadier Naser and by all the members of his family and his many servants. However Brigadier Khetarpal felt something was amiss but could not make out what it was, either the long silences that punctuated their conversation or the look of compassion in the women of the family. He could not make out but was sure he was being treated as someone very special.

Finally, on the last night before Brigadier M.L. Khetarpal's departure, Brigadier Naser said:

Sir, there is something that I wanted to tell you for many years but I did not know how to get through to you. Finally, fate has intervened and sent you to me as an honoured guest. The last few days we have become close to one another and that has made my task even more difficult. It is regarding your son who is, of course, a national hero in India. However, on that fateful day, your son and I were soldiers, unknown to one another, fighting for the respect and safety of our respective countries. I regret to tell you that your son died in my hands. Arun's courage was exemplary and he moved his tank with fearless courage and daring, totally unconcerned about his safety. Tank casualties were very high till finally there were just two of us left facing one another. We both fired simultaneously. It was destined that I was to live and he was to die. It was only later that I got to know how young he was and who he was.I had all along thought that I would ask your forgiveness, but in telling the story I realize that there is nothing to forgive. Instead I salute your son for what he did at such a young age and I salute you too, because I know how he grew into such a young man. In the end it is character and values that matter."

Brigadier M. L. Khetarpal was silent as he did not know how to react. He was confused that they were enjoying the hospitality of the person who had killed his son. However being a soldier himself he genuinely admired the chivalry of an officer whose complete squadron was decimated by his son. Both the Brigadiers retired for the night deep in thought.

The next day photographs were taken and Brigadier M. L. Khetarpal returned to Delhi. Later the photos reached Delhi along with a note from Brigadier Naser that said:

"With Warmest regards and utmost sincerity, To: Brigadier M.L. Khetarpal, father of Shaheed Second Lieutenant Arun Khetarpal, PVC, who stood like an unsurmountable rock, between the victory and failure, of the counterattack by the 'SPEARHEADS' 13 LANCERS on 16 December 1971 in the battle of "Bara Pind' as we call it and battle of "Basantar" as 17 Poona Horse remembers.

— --Khawja Mohammad Naser, 13 Lancers, 2 March 2001, Lahore, Pakistan.

Khetrapal is an iconic figure in the ethos of the Indian Army with prominent constructions being named after him. The parade ground at NDA is named Khetarpal Ground while the auditorium and one of the main gates bear his name at the IMA.

His Centurion tank was called Famagusta Jx 202. It was restored after the war and is presently preserved in the Armoured Corps Centre and School in Ahmednagar.

== In popular culture ==
- The fourteenth episode on DD National of the Param Vir Chakra TV series reprised his character in 1988.
- A graphic novel titled Param Vir Chakra by Amar Chitra Katha dedicated their fourteenth story written by Sanjana Kapur and drawn by Arijit Dutta Chowdhury in 2015.
- A graphic novel titled Param Vir Chakra Arun Khetarpal by Roli Books written by Ian Cardozo and drawn by Rishi Kumar in 2019.
- A graphical novel titled Ikkis by Amar Chitra Katha,written by Sanjana Kapoor and drawn by Arijit Dutta Chowdary
- Allu Sirish reprised Arun Khetarpal's character as Lt Chinmay in the 2017 Malayalam film 1971: Beyond Borders.
- A biopic titled Ikkis (Hindi: इक्कीस, romanized: Ikkīsa, lit. 'Twenty-one', the age at which Khetarpal achieved martyrdom) was released on 1 January 2026, where his character is reprised by Agastya Nanda. Dharmendra played the role of his father, Brigadier M. L. Khetarpal.

== See also ==
- The Poona Horse
