= Rathore (Rajput clan) =

Indian clan

Rathore is a Rajput clan that claims Suryavanshi descent. Some historians link their origin to the Rashtrakuta dynasty.

== Origin ==
The Rathores claim they are descended from the legendary Suryavanshi and Chandravanshi lineages of ancient India. According to this tradition, the Rathores are descended from the Solar Dynasty (Suryavanshi) and can trace their ancestry back to Rama and the Ikshvaku dynasty, one of the most ancient and legendary dynasties of India according to Hindu mythology.

According to some modern historians, Rathores originated from the Rashtrakuta's ancestors. Some branches of Rashtrakutas had migrated to Western Rajasthan as early as the late tenth century; some inscriptions of "Rathauras" have been founded in and around Marwar region of Rajasthan dating from the tenth to early thirteenth centuries; it's believed the Rathores might have emerged from one of the Rashtrakuta divisions.

== Notable people ==
- Milkha Singh, "The Flying Sikh," an iconic Indian athlete and four-time Asian Games gold medalist.
- Mirabai, 16th-century royal princess, Bhakti saint, and mystic poetess.
- Durgadas Rathore, 17th-century warrior celebrated for his guerrilla warfare against the Mughal Empire in defense of Marwar.
- Maharaja Ganga Singh, Maharaja of Bikaner (r. 1888–1943) and a statesman who represented India in the Imperial War Cabinet.
- Naik Jadunath Singh PVC, posthumous recipient of the Param Vir Chakra for his gallantry in the Indo-Pakistani War of 1947.
- Jaswant Singh, former senior Cabinet Minister of India, having served as Minister of Defence, Finance, and External Affairs.
- Jaimal Rathore, 16th-century warrior famed for his heroic defense of Chittorgarh Fort against Emperor Akbar.
- Amar Singh Rathore, 17th-century nobleman who killed Akbar's wazir, known for his valor and a subject of popular folk ballads.
- Maharaja Karni Singh, last ruling Maharaja of Bikaner, an Olympian trap-shooter, and a Member of Parliament for 25 years.
- Lt Gen Sagat Singh PVSM, known for his leadership during the liberation of Goa and the Bangladesh Liberation War of 1971.
- Fateh Singh Rathore, Indian Forest Service officer known for his tiger conservation and Ranthambore National Park.
- Kushal Singh of Auwa, a thakur of Auwa who was a prominent leader in the Indian Rebellion of 1857 in Rajasthan.
- Maharaja Umaid Singh, last ruling Maharaja of Jodhpur (r. 1918–1947) and commissioner of the Umaid Bhawan Palace.
- Mahavir Singh, revolutionary freedom fighter and a key associate of Bhagat Singh; died during a hunger strike in a British prison.
- Rao Gopal Singh Kharwa, leading figure of the Indian independence movement in Rajasthan.
- Rao Maldeo Rathore, 16th-century ruler of Marwar, known for his military expansion and resistance against the Sur Empire.
- Rao Chandrasen Rathore, 16th-century ruler of Marwar who never submitted to Mughal authority.
- Lt Gen Hanut Singh PVSM, MVC, decorated tank commander of the Indian Army, known for his role in the Battle of Basantar in 1971.
- Pabuji, 14th-century folk-deity from Rajasthan, revered in the Marwar region.
- Maharaja Sir Pratap Singh of Idar, decorated British Indian Army officer, statesman, and Regent of Jodhpur.
- Lt Gen Nathu Singh Rathore, senior Indian Army general and the first officer to be commissioned from the Indian Military Academy, Dehradun.
- Air Vice Marshal Chandan Singh MVC, AVSM, VrC, highly decorated officer of the Indian Air Force and a hero of the 1971 war.
- Rao Bika, 15th-century ruler and founder of the city and state of Bikaner.
- Rao Ratan Singh Rathore, 17th-century founder of the princely state of Ratlam.
- Colonel Karni Singh Rathore KC, recipient of the Kirti Chakra for his gallantry during counter-insurgency operations.
