= Lohara, Punjab =

Village in Punjab, Pakistan

Lohara لوہارا
- Village
- Location within Punjab, Pakistan Location within Pakistan
- Coordinates: 32°22′19″N 75°02′02″E
- Country: Pakistan
- Province: Punjab
- District: Narowal
- Tehsil: Zafarwal
- Elevation: 236 m (774 ft)
- Time zone: UTC+5 (PST)

Lohara is a village in Zafarwal Tehsil, Narowal District of Punjab province of Pakistan. It is in the Basantar River Valley, west of the river on the Darmaan-Shakargarh Road from Shakargarh to Zafarwal. Lohara is located northeast of Zafarwal, one kilometre east of the village of Hamral and 3.5 km west of the village of Nahr.

== History ==
The area around Lohara was incorporated within the Durrani Empire about 1747. It was briefly part of the Maratha Empire from 1758 to 1761, when it was retaken by the Durrani. In 1798, it was transferred to Ranjit Singh of Kashmir, along with what was to become the Narowal District and other lands, by Zaman Shah Durrani as a gift after Singh had defeated Durrani's army and conquered the area. In 1821, Ranjit Singh gave administration of the Shakargarh area to Amir Singh Sandhanwalia as a jagir. When the British took over Punjab in 1848, the area was included into Gurdaspur District. In 1947, under the Radcliffe Award after the partition of India, the area was transferred to Pakistan and attached to Sialkot District. It was transferred as part of Narowal tehsil into the new Narowal District in 1991. Zafarwal tehsil was created in 2009. Lohara has been a union council since the 2016 local bodies election.
