= 67th Armoured Regiment (India) =

Indian Army regiment

67th Armoured Regiment IAAC
- Active: 1967 – present
- Country: India
- Allegiance: India
- Branch: Indian Army
- Type: Armour
- Size: Regiment
- Nickname: The Spearhead
- Mottos: "Through Blood and Darkness to the Light Beyond"
- Equipment: T-72
- Decorations: Param Vishisht Seva Medal 1 Ati Vishisht Seva Medal 1 Yudh Seva Medal 1 Sena Medal (Gallantry) 2 Vishisht Seva Medal 1 Chief of Army Staff Commendation Cards 10; General Officer Commanding in Chief Commendation Cards 14

Commanders
- Colonel of the Regiment: Lieutenant General Devendra Sharma
- Notable commanders: Lt Gen Narinjan Singh Cheema

Insignia
- Abbreviation: 67 Armd Regt

67th Armoured Regiment is an armoured regiment which is part of the Armoured Corps of the Indian Army.

== Formation ==
The regiment was raised on 15 September 1967 at Ahmednagar by Lieutenant Colonel (later Lieutenant General) Niranjan Singh Cheema (ex Poona Horse) and was equipped with the indigenous Vijayanta tanks - the first regiment to be raised with indigenous tanks. The Regiment has a fixed class composition as regards its sabre squadrons, with one squadron each of Sikhs, Dogras and Jats. Brigadier Karam Singh, AVSM, VrC was the first Colonel of the Regiment.

== History ==
The Regiment bid farewell to the Vijayanta tanks in June 1984 and was converted to T-72 tanks. The Regiment has had the privilege of serving with distinction in all the three armoured divisions of the Indian Army and a large number of other armoured/infantry formations including a high altitude tenure in Leh. The regiment has participated in Operation Cactus Lily, Operation Trident, Operation Vijay, Operation Rakshak and Operation Parakram. The Regiment has also contributed personnel for United Nations peacekeeping operations and to the Rashtriya Rifles for counter-insurgency duties. The Regiment with its T-72 tanks took part in the Republic Day parade in 1992.

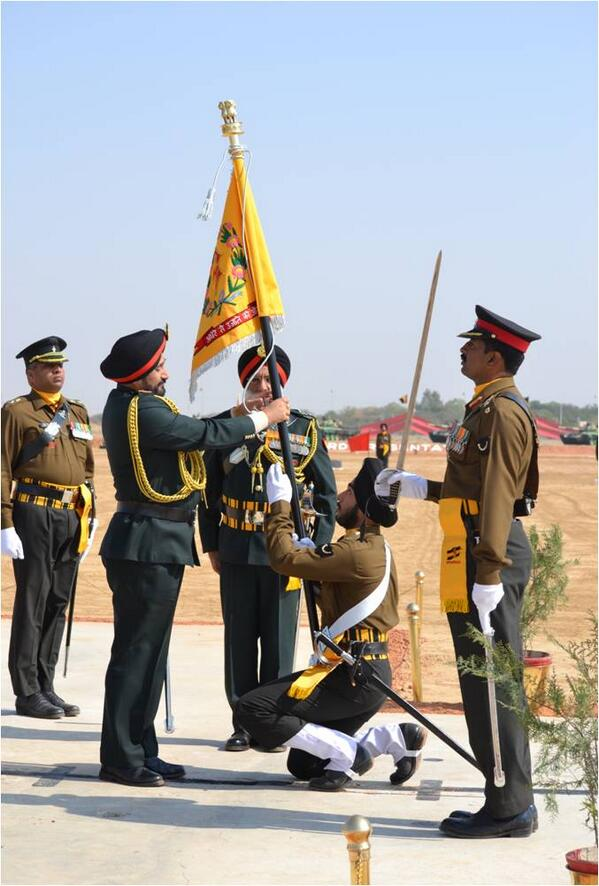
Standards presentation by General Bikram Singh

The Regiment celebrated its Silver Jubilee in 1992 at Hissar and was the proud recipient of the "President's Standard" on 21 February 2014 at Bikaner in recognition of its dedicated service for over four decades. A formation of roaring tanks took part in the parade commanded by Colonel B Ravi, the 21st Commandant. The Army Chief General Bikram Singh bestowed the prestigious honour on behalf of the President Mr Pranab Mukherjee upon the regiment for its meritorious service since its raising.

== Heraldry ==
The first Regimental Flag hoisted on raising had three vertical stripes coloured 'Red', 'Black' and 'Canary Yellow' signifying the regimental motto at that time – "Through blood and darkness to the light beyond".

The current Regiment Flag (as approved by Army HQ) has three vertical stripes coloured 'Black', 'Canary Yellow' and 'Black' with the Regiment badge in red colour embroidered in the centre stripe. The change in the colours led to a change in the Regiment Motto i.e., "Through darkness to the light beyond".

The distinct and elegant Spearhead regimental badge was designed by Colonel CL Proudfoot. The Regiment is nicknamed The Spearhead because of the shape of badge and its pride in participation in major offensive exercises as the leading regiment of the armoured formations it then served in.
