= 17th Horse (Poona Horse) =

Indian Army regiment

The Poona Horse
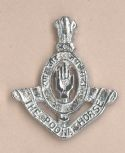
- Current Regimental Cap Badge
- Active: 1817 - present
- Country: British India (East India Company) Company ruled India; India
- Branch: Bombay Army; British Indian Army; Indian Army
- Type: Cavalry
- Size: Regiment
- Part of: Indian Army Armoured Corps
- Nicknames: Poona Horse, Fakhr-e- Hind
- Motto: रण वीर जय सदा (Ran Vir Jai Sada)
- Equipment: T-72 tanks
- Engagements: Third Anglo-Maratha War; Battle of Koregaon; First Anglo-Afghan War; Battle of Kandahar; Battle of Ghazni; Battle of Kabul; British conquest of Sindh; Battle of Meanee; Battle of Hyderabad; Anglo-Persian War; Battle of Kooshab; Indian Mutiny; Battle of Sindwaha; 1868 Expedition to Abyssinia; Second Anglo-Afghan War; Battle of Girishk; Battle of Maiwand; Battle of Kandahar (1880); Boxer Rebellion; Battle of Peking; First World War; First Battle of Ypres; Battle of Givenchy; Battle of La Basse; Battle of Armentiers; Battle of the Somme; Battle of Flers–Courcelette; Battle of Cambrai; Battle of Shaiba; Battle of Ctesiphon; Capture of Damascus; Third Anglo-Afghan War; Second World War; First Battle of El Alamein; Annexation of Hyderabad; Indo-Pakistani War of 1965; Indo-Pakistani War of 1971; Battle of Basantar

Commanders
- Colonel of the Regiment: General Dhiraj Seth
- Notable commanders: Lt Gen Hanut Singh, PVSM, MVC

The Poona Horse is an armoured regiment in the Armoured Corps of the Indian Army. Before Indian independence, the regiment was raised as a regular cavalry regiment in the Bombay Army of the East India Company and later became part of the British Indian Army. It was formed from the 3rd Regiment of Bombay Light Cavalry, raised in 1820, and the Poona Auxiliary Horse, raised about 1817–18. The latter unit was absorbed into the regular forces about 1860 and the two regiments later became the 33rd Queen Victoria's Own Light Cavalry and the 34th Prince Albert Victor's Own Poona Horse.

These were amalgamated in 1921 into the present regiment, the battle honours of which tell of service in three Afghan wars, in Persia, Abyssinia and China, as well as in the Great War. The regiment has fought with distinction in the 1965 and 1971 Indo-Pakistani wars, with an officer winning India's highest gallantry award, the Param Vir Chakra, in each war.

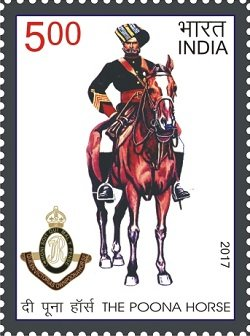
Commemorative postage stamp released on 11 February 2017 to celebrate the Bicentenary of the raising of the Poona Horse

== History ==
In accordance with article VI of The Treaty of Poona between the British Governor-General of India Lord Hastings and Baji Rao II (The Peshwa of the Maratha Empire), a force known as the Poona Auxiliary Force was to be recruited, which was raised on 15 June 1817. As per the treaty, the force would be maintained by the Maratha Peshwa, but commanded by British Officers and was supposed to be permanently stationed in the territory of Peshwas. The treaty provided authority for the British to use the force against the Peshwa when necessary. The regiment was raised under the order of Mountstuart Elphinstone, the Governor of Bombay.

Lt. Col J Cunnigham was the first Commandant of the regiment.

The two regiments that would go on to form the Poona Horse were the 33rd Queen Victoria's Own Light Cavalry and the 34th Prince Albert Victor's Own Poona Horse.

=== 33rd Queen Victoria's Own Light Cavalry ===
Raised at Sirur on 4 May 1820 by Major Peter Delamotte. It had 3 squadrons on its establishment, of which one was provided by 1st Regiment of Cavalry and one squadron from the 2nd Regiment of the Cavalry. The rest were inducted from suitable Indian Officers. and NCOs from 1st and 3rd Battalions of Poona Auxiliary Infantry, which were disbanded in 1820.

- 1820 3rd Regiment of Bombay Light Cavalry
- 1861 3rd Regiment of Bombay Silladar Light Cavalry
- 1861 3rd Regiment of Bombay Light Cavalry
- 1876 3rd (The Queen's Own) Regiment of Bombay Light Cavalry
- 1903 33rd Queen Victoria's Own Light Cavalry
- 1911 33rd Queen Victoria's Own Light Cavalry
- 1921 33rd/34th Cavalry
- 1922 17th Queen Victoria's Own Poona Horse
- 1927 The Poona Horse (17th Queen Victoria's Own Cavalry)
- 1947 To Indian Army
- 1950 The Poona Horse (17 Horse)

=== 34th Prince Albert Victor's Own Poona Horse ===
Raised at Poona (now Pune) on 15 July 1817 as a result of the treaty between the HEIC and the Peshwa Bajee Rao II.

- 1817 The Auxiliary Horse
- 1818 The Poona Auxiliary Horse
- 1847 The Poona Irregular Horse
- 1861 4th Regiment of Poona Silladar Horse
- 1861 1st Regiment of Poona Horse
- 1862 The Poona Horse
- 1885 4th Bombay Cavalry (Poona Horse)
- 1890 4th (Prince Albert Victor's Own) Bombay Cavalry (Poona Horse)
- 1903 34th Prince Albert Victor's Own Poona Horse
- 1921 33rd/34th Cavalry
- 1922 17th Queen Victoria's Own Poona Horse
- 1927 The Poona Horse (17th Queen Victoria's Own Cavalry)
- 1947 To Indian Army
- 1950 The Poona Horse (17 Horse)

== World War I ==
In August 1914, the Poona Horse was stationed at Secunderabad, as part of the 9th (Secunderabad) Cavalry Brigade. They were brigaded with the 7th Dragoon Guards and the 20th Deccan Horse. The Brigade was dispatched to France and fought on the Western Front their first action being the First Battle of Ypres.

=== France ===
On 2 November 1914 the regiment was sent to reinforce the 2nd Gurkhas in the Neuve Chapelle sector on arrival they discovered that the Gurkhas defences had been breached and overrun. The Poona Horse was asked to recapture the position. The Regiment launched a counterattack in daylight and without any artillery support. The Commanding Officer Lieutenant Colonel Swanston, who was leading the attack, was killed.

In France the regiment would be involved in the Battle of Givenchy, Battle of La Basse, Battle of Armentiers, Battle of the Somme (1916), Battle of Flers–Courcelette and Battle of Cambrai (1917). In February 1918, the Poona Horse and all the other Indian cavalry regiments in France were deployed to Palestine to join General Allenby's forces.

=== Palestine ===
The Poona Horse arrived in Egypt in April 1918; they now formed the 14th Cavalry Brigade of the 5th Cavalry Division with the Deccan Horse and the Sherwood Rangers Yeomanry.

The force also consisted of the 4th Cavalry Division, the Australian Mounted Division and the ANZAC Mounted Division.

On 19 September 1918, the allied offensive began. The Infantry broke through the Turkish defences and the Desert Mounted Corps followed up. When they reached the Gates of Damascus, the Poona Horse, along with rest of the 14th Cavalry Brigade, were tasked with patrolling the road from Homs to Damascus Road. When they charged a party of Arabs who ran off leaving a large car behind with a European seated inside the Risaldar Major Hamir Singh, believing him to be a spy, demanded his surrender. The European turned out to be Colonel T. E. Lawrence. "El Aurens" was not amused.

At 10:15 on the morning of 1 October 1918, the Regiment entered Damascus and after the rest of the Brigade. The Regiment was ordered to take Rayak and then march onto Aleppo, which they reached on 25 October just before the Armistice was signed on 30 October in Mudros Harbour, abroad the battleship HMS Agamemnon.

=== Mesopotamia ===
The 33rd Queen Victoria's Own were sent to Mesopotamia as part of the 6th (Poona) Division to counter Turkish advances and to protect the oil fields. They were involved in the Battle of Shaiba and the Battle of Ctesiphon.

== Between the wars ==
In 1919, the 33rd Light Cavalry, now part of the 1st (Risalpur) Cavalry Brigade, was posted to Risalpur where they were brigaded with the 1st Lancers and M Battery, RHA. On 6 May 1919, they received the information that the Afghan Army had attacked the outpost at Landi Khanna, north of the Khyber Pass, and was advancing into India. The infantry attacked the Khyber Pass to push the Afghans back. Once the pass had been cleared the cavalry advanced and after some skirmishing, and two set piece battles, the Afghan Army was dispersed.

=== Amalgamation ===
In 1920, the decision was made to reduce the number of Indian Cavalry Regiments from 39 to 21. This would leave the army with 18 amalgamated regiments, plus the 27th Light Cavalry, the 28th Light Cavalry and the Guides Cavalry. This change was promulgated under Indian Army Order No 1257 22 November 1921. Based on this decision, the 33rd Light Cavalry and 34th Poona Horse were amalgamated as the 33rd/34th Cavalry, which was changed in 1922 to the 17th Queen Victoria's Own Poona Horse. The regiment's new organisation was now three sabre squadrons and a headquarters squadron, which would contain all the specialists, i.e., machine gunners, signallers etc., in one squadron.

== World War II ==
The Poona Horse was one of two Indian Army cavalry regiments selected to remain horsed while the rest of the cavalry was mechanised. This situation did not last long and just after the start of the war the regiment was mechanised. The Headquarters Squadron now had a mortar troop, signals troop, 'B' echelon administrative troop and light Aid Detachment for forward vehicle recovery and repair. The sabre Squadrons each now comprised a Squadron Headquarters, four armoured carrier troops and one rifle troop. Each troop had four Bren carriers and the rifle troop was mounted in four 15 cwt Chevrolet trucks now mechanised they become the Divisional reconnaissance regiment for the 6th Indian Division and deployed to Iraq.

In 1942, the regiment was ordered to the Middle East to join the British Eighth Army. In the closing stages of the First Battle of El Alamein, the Poona Horse was the guard force for General Claude Auchinleck, the commander of the 8th Army at the tactical headquarters sited on the Ruweisat Ridge, the most prominent tactical feature of the Alamein position. This was the highlight of the Regiment's war for they were then ordered back to Iraq as part of the British Tenth Army. In September 1944 the Regiment was sent to Cyprus on garrison duties and were still there in May 1945 when Germany surrendered. The Regiment returned to India in October 1945 and were issued their first tanks, the Stuart MK IV.

== Post Independence ==
Annexation of Hyderabad

The Regiment with its Sherman tanks was part of the 1 Armoured Division and participated in Operation Polo leading to the integration of Hyderabad to the Union of India.

Indo-Pakistani War of 1965

The Poona Horse was part of the 1 Armoured Brigade, which also consisted of the 16th Cavalry and Hodson's Horse. The brigade was equipped with upgunned Sherman tanks and Centurion tanks. 1 Armoured Brigade was part of the 1 Armoured Division (of 1 Corps) along with the 43rd Lorried Infantry Brigade.

It participated in Operation Ablaze and Operation Nepal (Indian 1 Corps Offensive in Sialkot Sector). The regiment brought home decisive victories in the Battle of Phillora on 11 September 1965 by sheer gallantry of legendary Lieutenant Colonel Ardeshir B Tarapore. The regiment spearheaded the Indian advance into Pakistan and cleared the stronghold of Phillora after a gruelling close range tank battle against Patton tanks, in which 23 enemy tanks were destroyed. The regiment captured Wazirwali on 13 September 1965 and Jassoran and Butur-Dograndi on 16 September 1965.

Bicentenary celebrations of The Poona Horse, February 2017
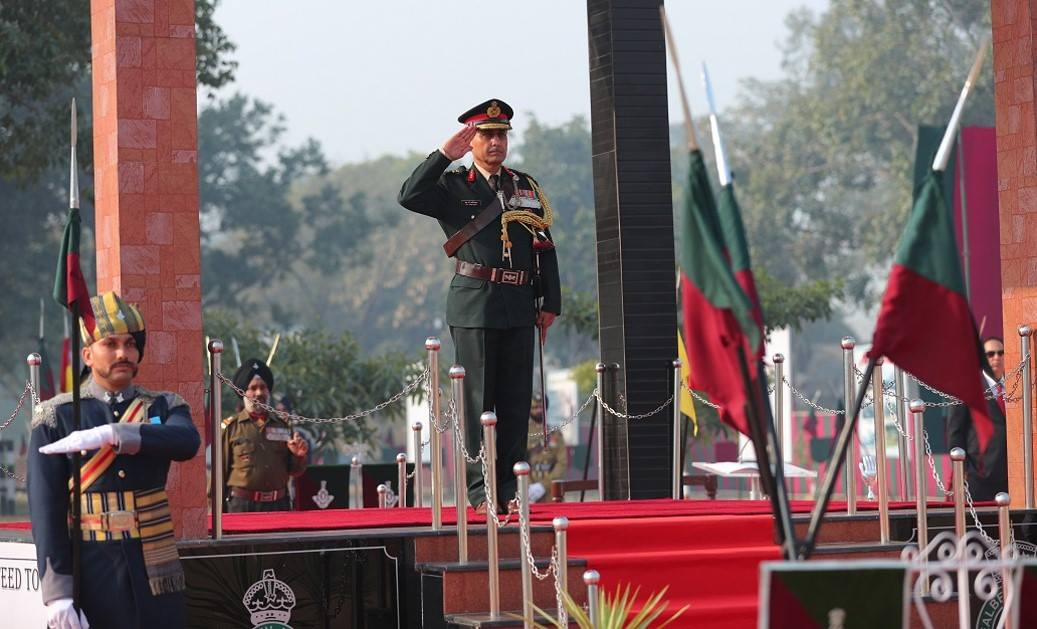
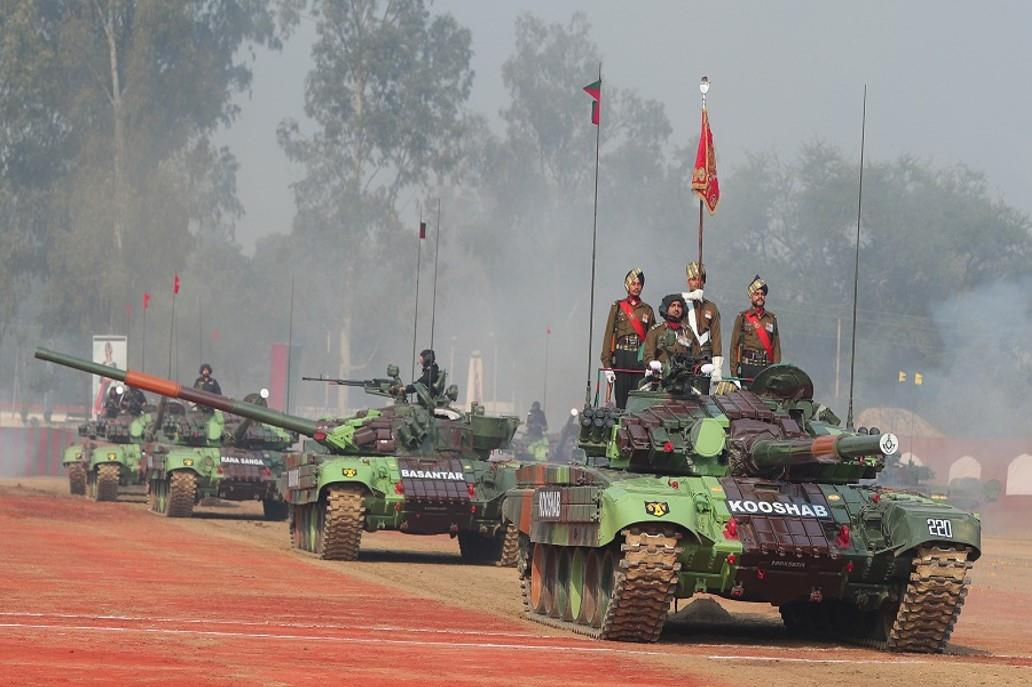
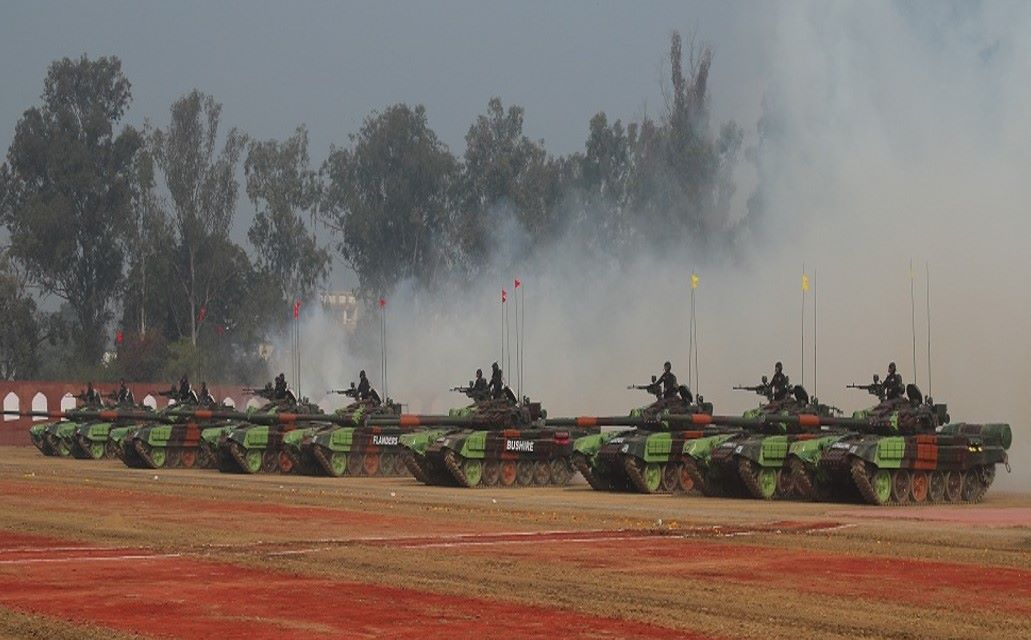
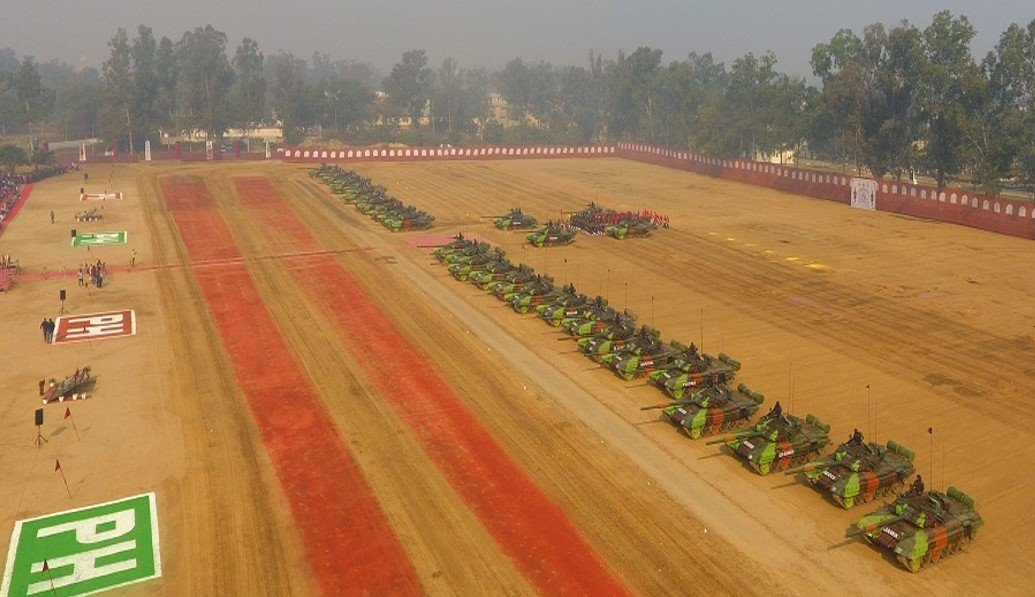

Indo-Pakistani War of 1971 (Battle of Basantar)

The Poona Horse under the command of 47 Infantry Brigade was ordered to establish a bridgehead across the Basantar river in the Shakargarh sector. The brigade's engineers were in the process of breaching the enemy minefields and create a safe lane that would allow the induction of the tanks. In view of the alarming activity of Pakistani artillery, the Poona Horse with its Centurion tanks decided to push through the minefield despite it being only partially cleared by that time. En route, while crossing the Basantar River, the tank troops came under fire from Pakistani tanks as well as recoil gun nests that were still holding out. They retaliated fiercely — destroying tanks, capturing gun nests and over-running enemy defences. 2nd Lieutenant Arun Khetarpal, who was posthumously awarded the prestigious Param Vir Chakra, was responsible for the destruction of 7 Pakistani tanks.

The following days saw Indian troops making massive gains and conducting successive military thrusts deep inside enemy territory, coming threateningly close to the Pakistan Army base at Sialkot. India's resounding victory in the Battle of Basantar resulted in the capture of a significant area ( including nearly 500 villages) under the control of Pakistan in Chhamb sector, apart from cutting off the line of retreat for Pakistani troops.

Other operations / achievements -

- The regiment had the honour to participate in the Republic Day Parade in 1981 with its Vijayanta tanks.
- The regiment was part of the United Nations Disengagement Observer Force (UNDOF) in Golan Heights from January 2006 to December 2008.
- The regiment was awarded the GOC-in-C (Western Command) unit citation in July 2014 for its role in counter-insurgency duties.
- The regiment was affiliated with the Indian Navy frigate, INS Sahyadri in December 2016.
- A Centurion tank of The Poona Horse was showcased during the Republic Day Parade, 2022.

== List of battle and theatre honours ==
The list of battle honours and theatre honours of the Poona Horse are as follows:

Pre World War I

Corygaum; Ghuznee 1839; Candahar 1842; Ghuznee 1842; Cabool 1842; Afghanistan 1839; Meeanee; Hyderabad; Reshire; Bushire; Koosh-Ab; Persia; Central India; Abyssinia; Kandahar 1880; Afghanistan 1879–80; China 1900; Afghanistan 1919.

The First World War

La Bassee 1914; Armentieres 1914; Somme 1916; Bazentin; Flers-Courcelette; Cambrai 1917; France and Flanders 1914–18; Megiddo;Sharon; Damascus; Palestine 1918; Shaiba; Ctesiphon; Tigris 1916; Mesopotamia 1914–16.

The Second World War

North Africa 1940–43.

Indo-Pak Conflict 1965

Phillora; Buttur Dograndi; Punjab 1965.

Indo-Pak Conflict 1971

Basantar River; Punjab 1971.

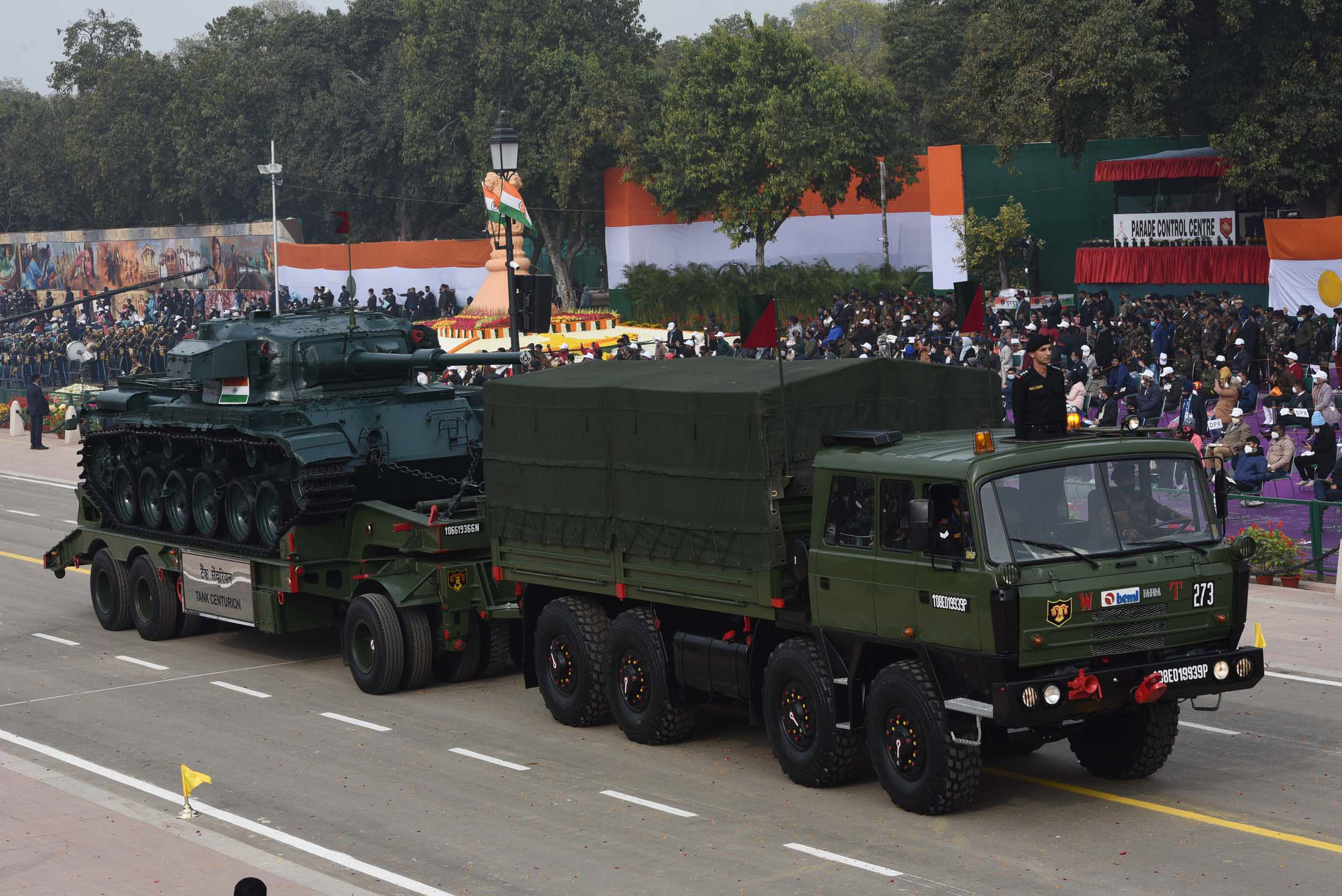
Centurion tank of Poona Horse (on tank transporter) during the Republic Day Parade, 2022. This parade showcased equipment used during the 1971 Indo-Pakistan war, on its 50th anniversary, which lead to the formation of Bangladesh.

== Victoria Cross ==
Members of the Regiment awarded the Victoria Cross.

- Lieutenant Arthur Thomas Moore 3rd Bombay Light Cavalry. On 18 February 1857.
- Lieutenant Frank Alexander de Pass 34th Prince Albert Victor's Own Poona Horse. On 24 November 1914.
- Lieutenant John Grant Malcolmson 3rd Bombay Light Cavalry. On 18 February 1857.
- Lieutenant (later Field Marshal) Sir Henry Evelyn Wood whilst on attachment with the 3rd Bombay Light Cavalry. On 19 October 1858.

== Param Vir Chakra ==
Since independence two members of the regiment have been awarded the Param Vir Chakra.

- Lieutenant Colonel Ardeshir Tarapore (Posthumous), Indo-Pakistani War of 1965, Battle of Butur-Dograndi
- 2nd Lieutenant Arun Khetarpal (Posthumous), Indo-Pakistani War of 1971, Battle of Basantar

== List of gallantry awards ==
World War I

- Victoria Cross : Lieutenant Frank Alexander de Pass, 34th Prince Albert Victor's Own Poona Horse.
- Order of British India : Risaldar Taj Muhammad Khan (33rd Queen Victoria's Own Light Cavalry), Risaldar Major Hussain Bakhsh Khan, Risaldar Hamir Singh (34th Prince Albert Victor's Own Poona Horse)
- Indian Order of Merit : Jemadar Ram Karan, Dafadar Arjan Singh, Risaldar Major Santa Singh, Dafadar Bishan Singh, Sowar Buda Singh, Sowar Mazhar Khan, Dafadar Nihal Singh (33rd Queen Victoria's Own Light Cavalry), Sowar Madho, Jemadar Prem Singh, Lance Dafadar Abdul Karim (34th Prince Albert Victor's Own Poona Horse)
- Indian Distinguished Service Medal : 33rd Queen Victoria's Own Light Cavalry – 14 medals, 34th Prince Albert Victor's Own Poona Horse – 29 medals
- Indian Meritorious Service Medal : 33rd Queen Victoria's Own Light Cavalry – 13 medals, 34th Prince Albert Victor's Own Poona Horse – 43 medals
- Croix de Guerre (French) : Dafadar Ahmed Khan (34th Prince Albert Victor's Own Poona Horse)
- Croix de guerre (Belgium) : Dafadar Nadir Ali Khan, Dafadar Nasir Muhammad Khan (34th Prince Albert Victor's Own Poona Horse)

World War II

- Officer of the Most Excellent Order of the British Empire : Lieutenant Colonel D.S.E. McNeill, The Poona Horse (17th Queen Victoria's Own Cavalry)
- Member of the Most Excellent Order of the British Empire : Captain Sardar Makhan Singh, The Poona Horse (17th Queen Victoria's Own Cavalry)

Civil disturbances during the Partition of India

- Ashoka Chakra, Class III Lance Dafadar Sultan Singh

Indo-Pakistani War of 1965

- Param Vir Chakra : Lieutenant Colonel Ardeshir Tarapore
- Vir Chakra : Lieutenant HIS Dhaliwal, Risaldar Kartar Singh
- Sena Medal : Dafadar Harnand Singh, Dafadar Hamir Singh, Risaldar Harbans Singh, Risaldar Sohan Singh, Lance Dafadar Dilip Singh
- Mentioned in dispatches : 12
- Commendation Cards : 6

Indo-Pakistani War of 1971

- Param Vir Chakra : 2nd Lieutenant Arun Khetarpal
- Maha Vir Chakra : Lieutenant Colonel Hanut Singh, Major Amarjith Singh Bal
- Vir Chakra : 2nd Lieutenant Avtar Singh Ahlawat, Naib Risaldar Mohan Singh, Sowar Mohan Singh
- Sena Medal : Captain Rabinder Singh Deol, Dafadar Khushal Singh
- Mentioned-in-Despatches : 10

Kashmir Insurgency

- Sena Medal :Major Ranbir Singh

== Notable personnel ==
- Major General Jang Shamsher Singh: First Indian Commanding Officer of the regiment in 1947.
- Major General R K Ranjit Singh: Commandant of the Defence Services Staff College, Wellington between 1968 and 1972.
- Lieutenant General Hanut Singh, PVSM, MVC: Commanded the regiment during the 1971 Indo Pak War and was popularly known as 'the Doyen of Mechanised Warfare in India' and 'Soldier Saint'. He commanded II Corps during Operation Brasstacks.
- Lieutenant General Niranjan Singh Cheema: Squadron Commander in the regiment during the 1965 war, raised 67 Armoured Regiment and retired as Chief of Staff, Northern Command.
- Lieutenant General Neville Foley: Director-General, Mechanised Forces and Member of Parliament.
- Lieutenant General Moti Dar, PVSM, AVSM: Commissioned into the Poona Horse in June 1958. On promotion to the rank of the Lieutenant Colonel, he raised and commanded 82 Armoured Regiment. He was the General Officer Commanding-in-Chief of Southern Command between January 1994 and July 1995 and Vice Chief of the Army Staff between July 1995 and July 1996.
- Lieutenant General Surrinder Singh, PVSM, AVSM: General Officer Commanding-in-Chief Northern Command from September 1993 to August 1996.
- Lieutenant General Balraj Takhar, PVSM, VSM: General Officer Commanding-in-Chief, Southern Command.
- Lieutenant General Ajai Singh, PVSM, AVSM: Director General, Mechanised Forces; GOC of 4 Corps and Governor of Assam between 2003 and 2008.
- Lieutenant General Dalbir Singh Sidhu, PVSM, AVSM, VSM : Director General, Mechanised Forces.
- Lieutenant General Rajan Bakshi, PVSM, UYSM, ADC : General Officer Commanding-in-Chief Central Command.
- Lieutenant General Rajeev Vasant Kanitkar, PVSM, AVSM, SM, VSM : General Officer Commanding XXI Corps and Quarter Master General
- Major General Vikram Dev Dogra, AVSM: First serving Indian Army Officer and only general in the world to do Ironman Triathlon twice.

== Regimental Class Composition ==
Prior to amalgamation, the class composition of the two Regiments was as follows :-

- 33rd Light Cavalry : A Squadron – Jats, B Squadron – Kaimkhanis, C Squadron – Mussalman Rajputs, D Squadron – Jat Sikhs.
- 34th Poona Horse : A Squadron – Rathore Rajputs from Jodhpur, B Squadron - Rathore Rajputs from Jodhpur, C squadron - Punjabi Mussalmans from Jhelum, D Squadron - Kaimkhanis from Shekhawati (Jaipur).

The class composition of the new amalgamated Regiment was to be as follows : (a) Headquarters Wing or Squadron; (b) A Squadron of Rathore Rajputs - purely from 34th Poona Horse; (c) B Squadron of Kaimkhanis - half squadron each from both the Regiments; (d) C Squadron of Jats - purely from 33rd Light Cavalry. Following the partition of India, the Kaimkhanis moved to Pakistan and were replaced by a squadron of Sikhs, which came from the 13th Lancers.

== Regimental insignia ==
Badge

Following amalgamation, the sanction for the crest and badge of Poona Horse came on 29 December 1928 vide Gazette of India No 1759. It consisted of the Royal and Imperial Cypher of Queen Victoria within the Garter with the words Honi soit qui mal y pense, surmounted by a Tudor Crown and having below a scroll with the words Queen Victoria's Own Poona Horse.

The present badge consists of an oval belt containing the motto of the regiment in Devanagari script ‘रण वीर जय सदा’ within the oval is the ‘hand of God’; the oval is surmounted by the lions of Ashoka; below oval, and curling up towards its sides, a scroll within which is embossed ‘THE POONA HORSE’.

The ‘hand of God’ comes from 8 February 1857, when the regiment wrote history at the famous 'Battle of Kooshab' against the Shah of Persia and captured the Standard of the 1st Khusgai Regiment of the Fars, acclaimed with courageous and fearless soldiers and Shah's personal bodyguards. The Standard of Persian Army now surmounts the Regiment's Standard, and it is etched in Persian with the words 'Yaad Ullal Fauk Idaheem' (the hand of God is above all things).

Motto

The motto of the regiment is ‘रण वीर जय सदा’ (Ran Vir Jai Sada); which translates to ‘the gallant warrior, ever victorious’.

Shoulder title

The shoulder title is in brass and consists two crossed swords overlaid by the ‘hand of God’ and a scroll with the words 'Poona Horse'. When combat fatigues are worn, the shoulder title consists of the numeral and letter ‘17H’.
