= Ved Prakash Airy =

Indian general (1935–2007)

Lieutenant General Ved Prakash Airy MVC
- Born: 20 March 1935; Karnal District, Haryana
- Died: 28 December 2007 (aged 72)
- Military career
- Allegiance: India
- Branch: Indian Army
- Rank: Lieutenant General
- Unit: 3 Grenadiers
- Conflicts: Battle of Basantar - Indo-Pakistani War of 1971
- Awards: Maha Vir Chakra

Lieutenant General Ved Prakash Airy, MVC (20 March 1935 – 28 December 2007) was an officer of the Indian Army, who served with the 3 Grenadiers. He is best known for his participation in the Battle of Basantar, one of the major battles of the Indo-Pakistani War of 1971, where he was awarded the Maha Vir Chakra, India's second highest award for gallantry in the face of the enemy.

== Early life and education ==
Lieutenant General Ved Prakash Airy was born on 20 March 1935 in Karnal District, Haryana. He was the son of Shri Ganga Bishen Airy of Karnal district in Haryana. After his education in Govt. High School and Dyal Singh College, Karnal, he joined National Defence Academy (NDA).

== Military career ==
After passing out of National Defence Academy (NDA), Lieutenant General Ved Prakash Airy was commissioned into 3 Grenadiers on 3 June 1956.

During the Indo-Pakistani War of 1971, Lieutenant Colonel VP Airy was commanding the 3 Grenadiers battalion which was deployed on the western front in the area of Bhairo Nath and Basantar River in the Shakargarh Sector, and was tasked to thwart any Pakistani army aggression and to capture the enemy area. Lieutenant Colonel VP Airy led his men from the front in a cool and calm demeanour, which inspired and motivated the entire battalion to take on the enemy. The battalion not only captured the enemy positions after fierce fighting but held on to them in spite of massive counter-attacks by Pakistani troops. Under heavy enemy shelling and small arms fire, he went from trench to trench motivating his men. Due to his personal example, conspicuous gallantry and inspiring leadership in keeping with the best traditions of the Indian Army he was awarded with the Maha Vir Chakra which is India's second highest military decoration. The Battle of Basantar was one of the vital battles in the western sector of the Indo Pakistan war of 1971 and lasted from December 4–16, 1971.

Lieutenant Colonel VP Airy also displayed a high level of morality and professionalism when he presented a citation to the Pakistan Army for the bravery of Lt Col Mohammed Akram Raja, based on which Lt Col Mohammed Akram Raja was awarded the Hilal-i-Jurat by the Pakistan Government.

Later, he rose to the rank of Lieutenant General before retiring from the active service of army. He died of natural causes on 28 December 2007.

== See also ==
- Battle of Basantar
- Indo-Pakistani War of 1971
