= Barapind =

Barapind Jarpal Old Name : Bara Pind Lohtian Jarpal
- Village
- Location in Pakistan
- Coordinates: 32°20′47″N 74°59′8″E
- Country: Pakistan
- Province: Punjab
- District: Narowal
- Tehsil: Shakargarh
- Union Council: Barapind

Population
  - Religion: Islam
  - Languages: Punjabi
- Time zone: UTC+5 (PST)
  - Summer (DST): +6
- Postal code span: 51800
- Area code: 0542
- Website: http://barapindpk.blogspot.com/

Jarpal, or Bara Pind (Punjabi, Urdu: بڑا پنڈ), is a village of Zafarwal Tehsil, Narowal District, in Punjab, Pakistan. It is located in the northeastern corner of Punjab and is geographically situated at 75E and 32N. Bara Pind is the birthplace of Punjabi poet Shiv Kumar Batalvi.

== History ==
The Battle of Jarpal Barapind or the Battle of Basantar (December 4–16, 1971) was one of the vital battles fought in this village as part of the Indo-Pakistani War of 1971 in the eastern sector of Pakistan. Before the partition of India in 1947, its name was Bara Pind Lohtian.

== Notable people ==
- Shiv Kumar Batalvi, Punjabi poet
- Muhib Rasool, volleyball player
- Rana Shahbaz Ahmad, politician
- Iftikhar Ahmad, Army officer, social activist
