= Param Vir Chakra (TV series) =

Indian army based television series

- Directed by: Chetan Anand; Vijay Anand; Ketan Anand
- Starring: Farooq Sheikh; Puneet Issar; Sunil Lahri; Kanwaljit Singh; Meena; Gurdas Maan; Pankaj Dheer; Naseeruddin Shah; Annu Kapoor; Sameer Arya
- Country of origin: India
- No. of seasons: 1

Production
- Editor: Jethu Mandal
- Camera setup: Vivek Anand

Original release
- Network: DD National
- Release: 1988

Param Vir Chakra is an Indian serial portraying the real life of Param Vir Chakra gallantry award winners, India's highest military honour.

The serial was directed by noted film director Chetan Anand, who previously made war films like Haqeeqat (1964) and Hindustan Ki Kasam (1973). It received critical acclaim when it first aired on Doordarshan channel in 1988. The first episode of the series featured the first recipient of the award, Major Som Nath Sharma of Kumaon Regiment.

== List of episodes ==
Episode	Portraying Actor	Production Notes
Major Somnath Sharma	Farooq Sheikh	
Lance Naik Karam Singh	Kanwaljit Singh	
Second Lieutenant Rama Raghoba Rane	Sunil Lahri	
Naik Jadunath Singh	Puneet Issar	
Company Havildar Major Piru Singh		
Captain Gurbachan Singh Salaria		
Major Dhan Singh Thapa	Phonsok Ladakhi	
Subedar Joginder Singh	Gurdas Maan	
Major Shaitan Singh	Pankaj Dheer	
Company Quarter Master Havildar Abdul Hamid	Naseeruddin Shah	
Lieutenant-Colonel Ardeshir Tarapore		This was filmed on location with a Vijayanta Tank regiment. With T-55s playing the part of Pakistani Patton tanks.
Lance Naik Albert Ekka	Annu Kapoor	
Flying Officer Nirmal Jit Singh Sekhon		This was shot at Kalaikunda Airbase where No.2 Squadron, IAF, had HAL Ajeet fighters that were used to represent the Gnat. Hawker Hunters of the OCU in Thunderbolts scheme were used to play the role of the PAF F-86 Sabres. A number of 'formation shots' were filmed on the ground.
2/Lieutenant Arun Khetarpal		This was filmed on location with a Vijayanta Tank regiment.
Major Hoshiar Singh Dahiya	Mangal Dhillon	

== See also ==
- 7 RCR (TV Series)
- Samvidhaan (TV Series)
- Satyamev Jayate (TV series)
- Pradhanmantri (TV Series)
- Television shows based on Indian history
