= Battle of Basantar =

Battle of the Indo-Pakistani War of 1971

Battle of Basantar/Shakargarh
- Part of the Indo-Pakistani War of 1971
- Indian soldiers celebrate their victory at the end of the Battle of Basantar on top of a knocked out Pakistani M47 Patton tank, December 1971.
Date	December 6–16, 1971 (1 week and 3 days)
Location	Shakargarh salient, Punjab, Pakistan, Pakistan
Result	Indian victory

Belligerents
India	Pakistan

Commanders and leaders
K K Singh MVC; WAG Pinto; A S Vaidya MVC & bar	Irshad Ahmad Khan; Abdul Ali Malik; Sharbat Ali Changezi

Strength
3 infantry divisions 2 armoured brigades 2 artillery brigades 2 engineer brigades	3 infantry divisions 1 armoured division 1 armoured brigade

Casualties and losses
13 tanks destroyed	46-48 tanks destroyed

The Battle of Basantar, also known as the Battle of Shakargarh or Battle of Barapind (December 4–16, 1971), was one of the vital battles fought as part of the Indo-Pakistani War of 1971 in the western sector of India. The Indian troops won a hard-fought battle that secured this area in the Jammu sector. The name Battle of Basantar actually encompasses the entire gamut of battles and skirmishes fought in the Shakargarh sector in the 1971 war.

== Location of battle ==
Basantar river flows in Samba of Jammu and Kashmir. It is a tributary of the Ravi River. This battle took place in the Shakargarh Sector or the Shakargarh Bulge that includes Jarpal and surrounding areas. The bulge was close to (5–15 miles) India's main road link to Jammu and Kashmir. By contrast, the area was not as vital for Pakistan.

Shakargarh was not easily defensible (one analyst called it "a defender's nightmare"). Unlike in other places in Punjab, Shakargarh does not have any serious water obstacles, nor boggy patches, and is relatively flat.

== Reasoning behind the battle ==
As the war began on the eastern front, Pakistan decided to open up the western sector to divert Indian troops from the Eastern front in Bangladesh and prolong the war. Shakargarh bulge was a key strategic area for India as it comprised road links between Jammu and Punjab, India. Therefore, securing the region was crucial for India as Pakistan had a military base nearby in Sialkot and therefore could have easily launched a massive invasion of the Shakargarh region, cutting Jammu and Kashmir from the rest of India. The Indian Army maintained a base at Pathankot, twenty three miles away from Shakargarh and quickly mobilized forces to defend the region. In an attempt to gain advantage through the element of surprise, the Indian Army, though outnumbered, attacked Pakistani positions in Jarpal area, triggering the Battle of Basantar.

== Battle plan ==
According to David R. Higgins, the Order of Battle was -

Pakistan -

- I Corps
  - 8th Infantry Division
  - 15th Infantry Division
  - 8th Armoured Brigade

India-

- I Corps
  - 36th Infantry Division (8, 115 Brigades initially)
  - 39th Infantry Division
  - 54th Infantry Division
  - 2 Armoured Brigades
  - 2 independent artillery brigades

== The battle ==
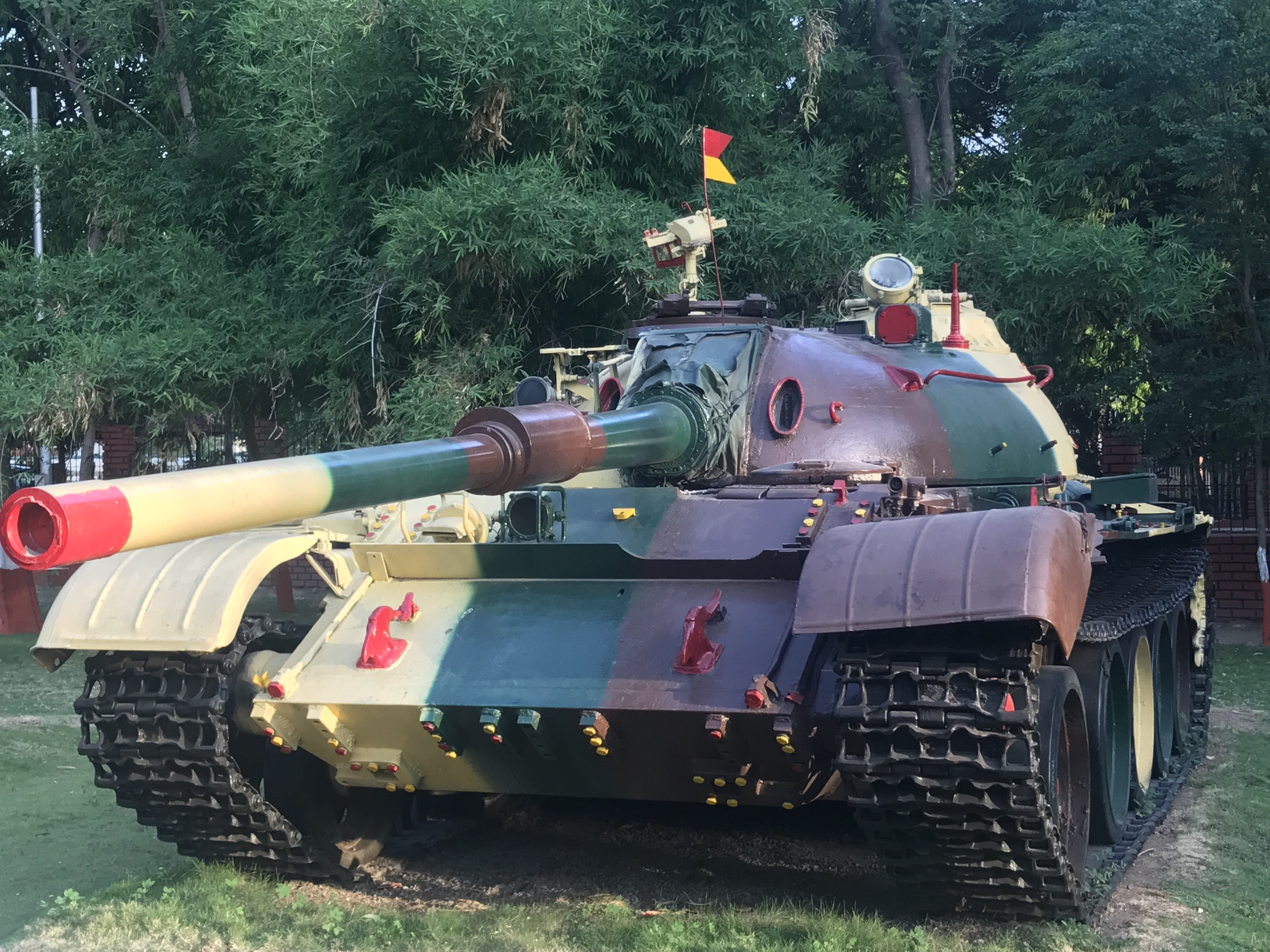
Indian Army T-55 tank

The offensive in this sector was launched a few days after war broke out between the two nations. The Indian I Corps moved into the sector to capture the key areas. The 54th Infantry Division under Maj Gen WAG Pinto and 16th Armoured Brigade moved towards the area. As they advanced they were met series of minefields and by stiff Pakistani resistance. A troop of T-55 tanks with trawls, created and trained by Captain JDS Jind, of the 7th Light Cavalry were attached for trawling with 16 (Independent) Armoured Brigade at the outbreak of hostilities on 3 December 1971, during the Indo-Pak war. The entire trawling ahead of 54 Infantry Division, led by 16 (Independent) Armoured Brigade was done by this troop. This allowed the tanks to move ahead before the "all vehicle safe lane was cleared by the Engineers. Thus, while the Indian division was bogged down as the engineers had not cleared all the mines, 2nd Lieutenant Arun Khetarpal of the 17th Poona Horse regiment, in a daring counter-attack, led his three tanks into the minefield area. A fierce tank battle ensued where a Pakistani tank was taken down. After suffering initial setbacks, the 8th Armoured Brigade of the Pakistan Army was called in to help the Pakistani resistance in the area. However, the Indian Army continued the assault and Lt. Arun Khetarpal with his two remaining tanks fought off and destroyed ten tanks before he was killed in action. Following the defeat in the battle, Pakistan launched a massive counter-attack which was planned in five phases:

- Ph I To capture North Portion of Lalial Res forest and beat back any local counter-attack (2145h on 15 Dec 71)
- Ph II to capture Jarpal and Lohal by 0500h 16 dec 71.
- Ph III To Est Bridge H incl area North of Lalial Forest, Jarpal and Lohal on Ni 15/16 Dec 71.
- Ph IV To Break out

After days of intense fighting that saw both sides gaining and losing territory, the battle was turning into a stalemate. However, despite being at a quantitative and qualitative disadvantage, Indian troops made massive gains during the final days of the battle and also repelled the Pakistani thrust. Towards the tail end of the battle, Pakistan Army's Lieutenant Colonel Akram Raja made a frantic attempt to counter-attack the Indian stronghold near Shakargarh by jumping into an old-style cavalry charge with his tanks. Launched in broad daylight in view of the Indian defensive positions which were well secured, the campaign was a disaster. The Indians continued their military thrust deep inside Pakistan and came threateningly close to the Pakistan Army base at Sialkot. Because of being outnumbered by the advancing Indian Army, the Pakistan Army called-in the Pakistan Air Force to repel the Indian attack on the base. Expecting another massive assault by the Indian Army, this time backed by Indian Air Force-support, and in no position to launch any counter-offensive operations in the region, Pakistan offered unconditional surrender which led to ceasefire. India had gained control of more than a thousand square miles before finally settling down to 350 sq mi (910 km^{2}) - 1000 km^{2} of Pakistan territory that included approximately 500 villages. 1 corps has 6 trawls from 7 cavalry under command of Capt. JDS Jind, that cleared 6 of the 9 attempted lanes, paving way for the Indian tanks to advance ahead.

== 75 Medium Regiment at the Battle of Basantar ==
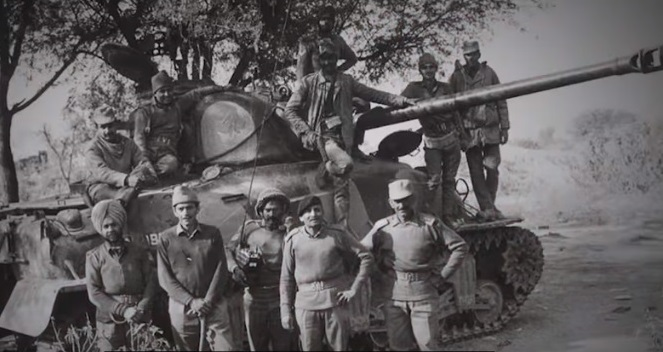
Lt Col K N Thadani (CO, 75 Med Regt) with Brig A S Vaidya (Cdr, 16 (I) Armd Bde), Maj Gen WAG Pinto (GOC, 54 Inf Div) & Brig Ujaggar Singh (Cdr 74 Inf Bde) after the Battle of Basantar, 17 December 1971.

75 Medium Regiment was placed in direct support of 16 (Independent) Armoured Brigade and remained so throughout the operation. The 47 Infantry Brigade and 91 Infantry Brigade along with 17 Horse sped forward towards Basantar. observation post officers of 75 Medium Regiment with these formations and units engaged a large number of active enemy targets including missile, launching bases and RCLs in area Lagwal. A number of direct hits on enemy tanks were scored by the regiment enhancing the morale of troops.

The Battle of Basantar bridgehead was an outstanding example of a well-integrated all arms battle, which turned the flank of a major enemy fortified obstacle and opened the way for Dhamtal and Zafarwal. The battle involved the breaching of minefield across Basantar about 1600 m in depth, establishing a bridgehead across the minefield clearing enemy pockets of resistance and enlarging the bridgehead, inducting troops across the minefield under heavy artillery fire and finally repulsing a number of enemy counterattacks with armour and infantry supported by air. A heavy concentration of accurate artillery fire was provided by the regiment during this battle.

The regiment, in addition to 2 observation post officers each with the forward Squadrons of 4 Horse and 17 Horse respectively, provided an observation post officer with 18 Rajputana Rifles (APC) and one observation post officer each with 47 Infantry Brigade and 91 Infantry Brigade, respectively. The regiment provided intimate medium artillery fire support throughout the battle.

On the morning of 16 December 1971, Captain Satish Chander Sehgal the observation post officer with 17 Horse, who in addition to his duties of observation post officer was performing the duty of the commander of his tank, engaged enemy tanks 200 yards away which were attempting to withdraw behind a smokescreen. He brought down large crumps of medium artillery fire forcing the enemy tanks to withdraw into a forest nearby, he then charged forward and destroyed the enemy tank trying to escape with his tank gun. In the action that pursued, his own tank was hit and caught fire. With utter disregard for his safety, he along with his radio operator, helped to extricate the driver and gunner from the burning tank. While doing so he was hit by enemy machine gun fire and was killed in action.

Thereafter the artillery engagement continued with the remaining forward observers passing corrections to the commanding officer of the regiment, Lieutenant Colonel KN Thadani, over the armour net. The intimate artillery fire support provided by the regiment to the advancing armoured squadrons made a significant contribution in immobilizing the enemy, thereby facilitating the advance across the bridgehead. In support of this action the commanding officer of the regiment also planned and coordinated the artillery fire of 54 Artillery Brigade and 41 (Independent) Artillery Brigade.

After the battle, the Commander of 16 (Independent) Armoured Brigade, Brigadier AS Vaidya MVC, came to the gun position of the regiment and told the gunners that he would like to have the Regiment with him again for the next round of battle. It was heartwarming for the gunners to listen to their commander.

=== 75 Medium Regiment in direct support of 16 (Independent) Armoured Brigade ===
In the event of War, the 75 Medium Regiment was placed in direct support of 16 (Independent) Armoured Brigade and remained so throughout the operation. The regiment was commanded by Lieutenant Colonel KN Thadani, leading the regiment from the front. The regiment moved from its peacetime location to its operational location in area Gagwal.

During the period immediately preceding the war Lieutenant Colonel KN Thadani initiated intensive affiliation training, particularly with armoured squadrons. 10 tanks were allotted to the regiment for the observation post officers (OP officers), and the cavalry officers imparted intensive training to the OP officers in operating the tanks, which later proved to be of major advantage.

- The following OP officers were provided
  - Major MS Brar (Battery Commander) OP officer with 'A' Squadron 4 HORSE
  - Major A Gopala Krishna (Battery Commander) OP officer with 'A' Squadron 17 HORSE
  - Captain Madhu Mahbubani OP officer with 'C' Squadron 4 HORSE
  - Captain Satish Chander Sehgal OP officer with 'C' Squadron 17 HORSE
  - Captain Mohan Krishnan OP officer with 47 Infantry Brigade (16 DOGRA 3-15 Dec 71) ('C' Company 3 Grenadiers – JARPAL 16-17 Dec 71)
  - Captain SV Bhong OP officer with 91 Infantry Brigade (3/1 GR)
  - 2/Lieutenant AK Mudgal (Troop Leader 752, then OP officer with 39 Artillery Brigade 9-17 Dec 71)
  - One OP officer each with 'B' Squadron 4 HORSE and 'B' Squadron 17 HORSE from 70 Medium Regiment.
- At the Gun Position
  - Major BS Sahrawat (2IC)
  - Major Tyagarajan (Regiment Medical officer)
  - Captain Rajesh Kumar (Adjutant)
  - Captain SS Yadav (Survey Officer)
  - Captain Sawinder Singh (Quarter Master)
  - 2/Lieutenant TN Ram (Gun Position officer, 751)
  - 2/Lieutenant Ashok Arora (Gun Position officer, 752)
  - 2/Lieutenant AK Mudgal (Troop Leader, 752)
  - Subedar Major Mohinder Singh (Administration of troops & Local defences)
  - Subedar Narayan Singh (Gun Position officer, 753)
  - Subedar Jagan Nath (Troop Leader, 751)

All ranks set about making themselves operationally ready for the task ahead. Ammunition was brought forward to the gun position, gun pits and bunkers dug and local defence coordinated. At the brigade, regiment and battery levels operational conferences/briefings were held and detailed preparations carried out for the on-coming battle. At this stage the OP parties were integrated with respective armoured squadrons/infantry companies.

The pre-emptive strike by the Pakistan air force on the air fields at, Pathankot, Jammu, Srinagar, Adampur and Amritsar on 3 Dec 71 was like a bugle call to the forces in the Samba-Zafarwal sector. The armoured and infantry units moved forward into their battle locations, the radio silence a lull before the storm.

The forces in Samba-Zafarwal sector consisting of 54 Infantry Division with under command 16 (Independent) Armoured Brigade with 75 Medium Regiment in direct support were unleashed on the enemy. The enemy border posts were soon captured and the offensive resumed under cover of artillery fire. The regiment engaged a number of tanks, RCLs, active machine guns and mortar positions considerably facilitating the advance of the armoured and infantry columns.

- Action at Thakurdwara

On 6 Dec 71, 4 Horse encountered minefields north of Thakurdwara. The enemy RCLs and machine guns covering the minefields were effectively engaged by Major MS Brar and Captain Madhu Mahbubani. The 600 m deep minefield was breached with trawl tanks closely followed by 'C' squadron 4 Horse. The enemy targets including one mortar position and an air defence gun position in the flanks were effectively engaged at this stage. 'A' squadron 4 Horse closely followed by 16 Dogra were then inducted into the bridgehead taking the enemy completely by surprise. In this speedy engagement the enemy lost 5 tanks in a matter of minutes and staggered back, opening the axis to the advancing forces.

The forces advanced rapidly in the face of heavy enemy artillery fire, arial straffing and machine gun fire; and destroyed a number of enemy tanks, RCLs and machine guns, a number of abandoned tanks were also captured and prisoners taken. A number of hostile batteries and active mortars were also effectively engaged by the regiment at this stage of battle. The success of this engagement was entirely due to the swift forward movement by the armoured tanks and close and intensive fire support provided by the regiment.

- Action at Chakra

The action at Chakra across the Karir N was a major action which involved the crossing of Karir N, breaching a minefield about 800 m in depth, inducting armour and infantry across the obstacle by night and capturing the fortified defences in area Chakra-Delhra. This action was fought by 47 Infantry Brigade with under command 'C' squadron 4 Horse.

The regiment provided intimate fire support in this action. Captain Madhu Mahbubani the OP officer with 'C' squadron 4 Horse engaged enemy tanks and infantry bunkers. The fire of 54 Artillery Brigade and 41 (Independent) Artillery Brigade was skillfully coordinated by the commanding officer of the regiment along with Major BS Sahrawat (2IC) and Captain Rajesh Kumar (adjutant) in support of the attacking troops. The devastating effect of artillery fire made a major contribution in shattering the enemy's will to fight, greatly facilitating the capture of the fortified defences in area Chakra-Delhra. Thereafter, at first light on 11 Dec 71, again the fire of the regiment was brought down on enemy targets, which resulted in the breaking up of the enemy's attack at Chakra.

This action was an outstanding example of a well integrated all arms action; the engineers breached the minefield with trawl tanks, the armour in spite of difficult terrain bulldozed their way across and the infantry built up in sufficient strength, all in one night under cover of heavy and accurate concentration of artillery fire provided by the regiment. In this action the enemy suffered heavy casualties including a number of tanks. This action greatly facilitated subsequent advance of the forces.

- Action at JARPAL

'C' company 3 Grenadiers under command Major Hoshiar Singh with Captain Mohan Krishnan as the forward observation officer came under heavy enemy artillery shelling and machine gun fire followed by a massive counterattack. Captain Mohan Krishnan together with his radio operators L/Naik Onkar Nath, ORA Rajender Pal and technical assistant gunner Rajender Prasad moved forward to a vantage point and brought down heavy crumps of artillery fire on the enemy bunkers, machine gun nests and the advancing enemy, thus breaking up the enemy's counterattack.

The commanding officer of the regiment coordinated the artillery fire, while L/Havildar K Ramachandran, the commanding officer's radio operator sat in a jeep at Lagwal relaying the fire orders of the forward observation officers to the guns and displayed selfless devotion to duty, tenacity and courage throughout the battle despite numerous battle hazards. L/Naik Gopalakrishna and ORA Shyam Narain Rai joined him after last light to help in his tasks. At Bari, L/Havildar Mohan Lal who was manning a step-up station came under enemy artillery shelling. He remained calm and stood fast to his radio set and continued to assist in the passage of fire orders.

The survey officer, Captain SS Yadav with Gunner Mohan Lal the commanding officer's driver were bringing forward important documents to the commanding officer when they came under enemy shelling. Gunner VK Premachandran the dispatch rider accompanying them got a direct shell hit and died instantaneously. Captain SS Yadav went back to arrange for Gunner VK Premachandran's evacuation and Gunner Mohan Lal drove across the area under shelling and reached the commanding officer in time.

- Regiment Gun Position

Major BS Sahrawat, the second-in-command of the regiment and Captain Rajesh Kumar, the adjutant organized the gun position and the movement of guns by night with skill and ensured quick response of the guns to the frequent calls for fire from the forward observation post officers.

Subedar Major Mohinder Singh at the gun position was busy going from gun to gun encouraging the detachments and inspiring them to give their best. His sincere efforts and leadership made a major contribution in providing the continuous fire support called for by the advancing 16 (Independent) Armoured Brigade.

2/Lieutenant TN Ram the gun position officer 751, moved forward with his battery at night in the thick of battle and occupied battery gun position at Galar to ensure continuous fire support to the advancing armour and infantry. Subedar Jagan Nath was the Troop leader at Galar where his troop gun position was repeatedly straffed by the enemy aircraft, being the last day before cease fire the enemy air was particularly active against the gun position; he showed courage and high sense of duty by moving from gun to gun ensuring continuous firing of his guns. When he saw an enemy aircraft coming low to straff his guns he picked up a light machine gun in anti-aircraft role and hose piped fire at the enemy aircraft, keeping them at bay and saved the gun position from their straffing. This aircraft was soon shot down by an air defence gun of 64 Air Defence Battery positioned nearby.

After the war, the regiment was awarded the battle honour "Basantar River" in recognition of extraordinary heroism and exemplary combat performance while in direct support of the 16 (Independent) Armoured Brigade during the Indo-Pak War of 1971 (Operation Cactus Lily); and is proudly called "MVC Regiment". For their acts of gallantry, distinguished service of a high order and courageous devotion to duty, the Commander of the armoured brigade Brigadier AS Vaidya MVC was awarded the Bar to MVC, the commanding officer of the regiment Lieutenant Colonel KN Thadani was awarded a VSM, Major MS Brar observation post officer with 'A' squadron 4 Horse was awarded a SM, Captain Satish Chander Sehgal observation post officer with 'C' squadron 17 Horse was awarded a VrC (Posthumously), Captain Madhu Mahbubani observation post officer with 'C' squadron 4 Horse, Captain Mohan Krishnan observation post officer with 'C' company 3 Grenadiers and Subedar Major Mohinder Singh at the gun position were awarded Mentioned in Dispatches.

== 9 Engineer Regiment at the Battle of Basantar ==
In the Shakargarh sector, Indian tanks were inducted into enemy territory through a safe passage created by the 9 Engineer Regiment. The 9 Engineer Regiment, composed of South Indian troops, was placed under the command of 54 Infantry Division. The regiment comprised three field companies, namely 404, 405 and 406, which were individually allotted to each of the three Infantry Brigades of 54 Infantry Division. At the commencement of the 1971 Indo-Pak war, 9 Engineer Regiment was to assist its sister battalion, 5 Engineer Regiment, in support of its offensive in the Samba-Zafarwal alignment. The advance was through a seemingly impassable terrain, fortified at a number of places by Pakistani forces with extensive minefields all along likely approach routes of ingress.

On December 5, 1971, at about 7.30 pm, 2/Lieutenant NP Singh of the regiment left with his task force for Dera Post from where they started laying an operational track for the Indian offensive. At about 9.30 pm, the leading task force entered Pakistani territory. The Regiment's Commanding Officer, Lt Col BT Pandit, after briefly supervising this specialized task, proceeded ahead in order to guide his men. He came out very successfully in this delicate task.

On December 6, at about 2.30 pm, the track was completed up to Badala-Gujran in Pakistan. On December 7, for breaching the minefield in area Thakurdwara, 404 Field Company was placed under the command of 47 Infantry Brigade from 8 pm onwards. Nearby, the other field company of regiment - 405 Field Company-in conjunction with trawls, breached a vehicle safe lane, 5 meters wide and 500 meters long, in one hour. Thereafter, a field company of 5 Engineer Regiment and a platoon of 404 Field Company widened this lane by one meter.

=== The Sappers laying an operational track ===
On December 8, 404 Field Company, on completing its task with 47 Infantry Brigade, was earmarked for providing engineer support to 91 Infantry Brigade. Simultaneously, 405 Field Company was rendered engineering support for the advance of 16 (Independent) Armoured Brigade in the area south and south-west of Bari. Meanwhile, 406 Field Company extended the operational track beyond Tarakwal. On December 9, 404 Field Company was earmarked for 74 Infantry Brigade. The operational track was then connected to Bari following which the maintenance of the entire length of track continued.

On the night of December 10/11, a platoon of 405 Field Company, deployed with 16 (Independent) Armoured Brigade and commanded by Naib Subedar Doraiswamy, was employed on minefield breaching task with trawls. At about 11pm, the build-up of armour into the bridgehead was seriously hampered by a damaged tank obstructed traffic through the lane. Reopening of the lane was of utmost importance in order to successfully ensure the defence of the bridgehead.

Naib Subedar Doraiswamy, on his own initiative and displaying exemplary courage, took a small party forward through the Pakistani artillery barrage and succeeded in hand-breaching a detour round the stalled tank ensuring speedy induction of armour and essential infantry support weapons through the minefield and into the bridgehead.

On December 11, a diversion on the Mawa-Pangdaur road was constructed for the free movement of vehicles. Three reconnaissance patrols of 404 Field Company advanced with 91 Infantry Brigade to three different points for minefield reconnaissance. A second minefield lane was lined with the operational track on December 12. Simultaneously, 405 Field Company also cleared a minefield lane for the 16 (Independent) Armoured Brigade. On December 13 night, it breached an enemy minefield with trawls 1,300 meters deep, north of Lohara and further extended it up to Lohara.

On December 15, an Engineer Task Force comprising elements of 404, 405 and 406 Field Companies was grouped with 47 Infantry Brigade for crossing Basantar in the Lagwal area. The task involved extension of the operational track from Lohara to Lagwal, breaching of an enemy minefield at Basantar, improvement of crossing the riverbed and construction of crossing points on two marshy nullahs which were subsidiary obstacles.

The work commenced at 8 pm on December 15 and was carried out under intense Pakistani small arms, tanks and artillery fire. The Task Force, under Major VR Choudhary, was deployed for breaching minefield and constructing a passage for tanks and other vehicles through the river Basantar in Lagwal area. On reaching the obstacle at about 8.30 pm, the Task Force found the situation very confusing on account of intense shelling and small arms fire which was further aggravated because of scanty information about the obstacle itself. As conventional reconnaissance would have taken considerable time, the Task Force Commander decided to disregard normal drills and safety precautions and to send a small party on a wide frontage at normal walking speed.

Sensing the urgency of the situation, Captain Ravinder Nath Gupta displayed exemplary bravery and volunteered for this hazardous task and led a small party of one junior commissioned officer and two other ranks right up to the far edge of the minefield. Despite the grave risk involved and very intense enemy fire, he and his party brought back vital data by 9.30 pm which enabled the task to be successfully completed by 2.30 am on December 16.

This enabled 17 Horse with two companies to be inducted into the bridgehead by 3 am, well in time to take on the enemy's counter-attacks and eventually lead to the destruction of the enemy armoured formation west of river Basantar. Subsequently, when the enemy put up in a counter-attack, Captain Ravinder Nath Gupta personally guided tanks of 17 Horse through the cleared minefield lane for which marking was still in progress.

Major VR Choudhary, Major SS Malik, Captain Ravinder Nath Gupta, 2/Lieutenant KM Mandanna, two Junior Commissioned Officers and two Other Ranks were killed in action. Major SP Sharma and 12 Other Ranks were wounded in action in the shelling. Operations ceased at 8 pm on December 17. The War Diary of the regiment records: “After overcoming the initial shock of the death of our gallant Officers, Junior Commissioned Officers and Other Ranks, we are prepared to breach more Basantars."

After the war the 9 Engineer Regiment was awarded the battle honour "Basantar River" and Theatre Honour "Punjab" for their heroic exploits during the Indo-Pak War of 1971 (Operation Cactus Lily); and is proudly called "Basantar Regiment".

== Conclusion ==
Invading into Indian territory beyond the Shakargarh bulge was one of the most crucial components of Pakistan's war strategy in the western sector. Pakistan hoped that by occupying Indian territory beyond the bulge, the main link between Kashmir and Pathankot would be cut-off, following which, it could easily invade Jammu and Kashmir. Pakistani military forces stationed in Sialkot base would keep Pathankot at bay, thwarting any Indian attempts to capture Shakargarh. However, Pakistan's battle plans were jeopardized because of the ingenuity of a bold attack by India. The Indian Army attacked Pakistani positions in the region within four days of the declaration of the state of war, catching the Pakistanis completely by surprise. After a few days of intense fighting, the Indian Army had not only pushed the Pakistanis back, but had also come close to capturing Sialkot.

Pakistan Army generally regards this as their most humbling defeat, next only to the Battle of Longewala despite some numerical and qualitative superiority over the opposing force, the entire military campaign in the region was not successful for Pakistan. In this battle alone, India had destroyed close to 46 tanks losing only a few in the process. Pakistan's Hamoodur Rahman Commission recommended that the Commander 1 Corps, who "surrendered to the enemy without a fight" should "be tried for criminal and willful neglect of duty" and poor conduct of operations, that "seriously jeopardized the Army offensive in the south. This and other battles put paid to any Pakistani hopes of bargaining for territory lost in East Pakistan, by capturing Indian territory. In fact, Pakistan lost around 15,000 km² territory in West Pakistan. This captured territory was returned to Pakistan after Shimla Agreement.

The Indian Army, on the other hand, was criticized for their somewhat timid handling of the attack on Sialkot. The Army, however, stated that it was planning another assault on Sialkot with close air support from the Indian Air Force, when the cease-fire was declared.

The Pakistani Patton tank disabled during the Battle of Basantar in Pakistan, is now a War Trophy given to the 54th Infantry Division by the Indian Army, and an attraction for visitors to the Tank Bund Road in the South Indian city of Hyderabad. The 47 Infantry Brigade, part of the 54th Infantry Division, was christened Basantar Brigade after the war.

== Awards ==
Key
†	Indicates posthumous honour

Award	Rank	Name	Unit	References
Param Vir Chakra	Second Lieutenant	Arun Khetarpal †	17 Poona Horse	
Param Vir Chakra	Major	Hoshiar Singh Dahiya	3 Grenadiers	
Maha Vir Chakra	Lieutenant Colonel	Sukhjit Singh	Scinde Horse	
Maha Vir Chakra	Lieutenant Colonel	Bhawani Singh	10 Para (Commando)	
Maha Vir Chakra	Major	Vijay Rattan Choudhry †	9 Engineer Regiment	
Maha Vir Chakra	Lieutenant Colonel	Hanut Singh	17 Poona Horse	
Maha Vir Chakra	Major	Amarjit Singh Bal	17 Poona Horse	
Maha Vir Chakra	Lieutenant Colonel	Ved Prakash Ghai †	16 Madras	
Maha Vir Chakra	Lieutenant Colonel	Raj Mohan Vohra	4 Horse	
Maha Vir Chakra	Lieutenant Colonel	Ved Prakash Airy	3 Grenadiers	
Maha Vir Chakra	Havildar	Thomas Philipose	16 Madras	
Vir Chakra	Captain	Satish Chander Sehgal †	75 Medium Regiment	
Vir Chakra	Lieutenant Colonel	B T Pandit	9 Engineer Regiment	
Vir Chakra	Captain	Ravinder Nath Gupta †	9 Engineer Regiment	
Vir Chakra	Naib Subedar	Dorai Swamy	9 Engineer Regiment	

Lt Col Mohammed Akram Raja was awarded Hilal-i-Jurat by the Pakistan Government on the basis of a citation written by Lt Col Ved Airy, who was Commanding Officer, 3 Grenadiers, Indian Army

== In popular culture ==
- 1971: Beyond Borders (2017) was directed by Major Ravi (with Mohanlal as Colonel Mahadevan, the fourth in the Major Mahadevan film series, was modelled on Major Hoshiar Singh Dahiya, with Allu Sirish as Second Lieutenant Arun Khetarpal, and Arunoday Singh as the Pakistani Colonel Raza.
- The 2026 biographical film Ikkis was directed by Sriram Raghavan, with Agastya Nanda starring as Second Lieutenant Arun Khetarpal.
- The 2026 war film Border 2 has Varun Dhawan starring as Major Hoshiar Singh Dahiya.

== See also ==
- India-Pakistan battles
- Indo-Pakistani wars and conflicts
