= Hoshiar Singh Dahiya =

(Recipient of Param Vir Chakra) Indian Military Officer (1936-1998)

Colonel Hoshiar Singh Dahiya PVC
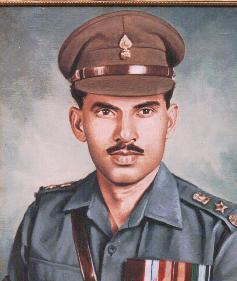
- Born: Hoshiar Singh Dahiya; 5 May 1936; Sisana, Rohtak District, Punjab, British India (now in Sonipat District, Haryana, India)
- Died: 6 December 1998 (aged 62); Jaipur, Rajasthan, India
- Other name: H. S. Dahiya
- Military career
- Allegiance: India
- Branch: Indian Army
- Service years: 1963–1988
- Rank: Colonel
- Service number: IC-14608A
- Unit: The Grenadiers
- Conflicts: Indo-Pakistan War of 1965; Indo-Pakistani War of 1971; Battle of Basantar
- Awards: Param Vir Chakra

Colonel Hoshiar Singh Dahiya, PVC (5 May 1936 – 6 December 1998) was an Indian military officer and a recipient of India's highest military honour, the Param Vir Chakra, for his gallantry during the Indo-Pakistani war of 1971.

== Early life ==
Hoshiar Singh Dahiya was born in Sisana village, Sonipat district, Haryana to Choudhary Hira Singh in a Jat family of Dahiya clan. After his schooling and one year's study at the Jat College, Rohtak, he joined the Army. He was married to Dhanwanti Devi, who is still alive as of January 2026. He was commissioned in The Grenadiers Regiment of the Indian Army on 30 June 1963, and was promoted lieutenant on 30 June 1965.

His first posting was in NEFA. In the 1965 Indo-Pakistan war, he saw some action in the Rajasthan sector, for which he was mentioned in despatches. He was promoted to captain on 30 June 1969.

== Param Vir Chakra Citation ==
The Param Vir Chakra citation on the Official Indian Army Website reads as follows:

CITATION

MAJOR HOSHIAR SINGH

3 GRENADIERS (IC-14608)

On 15 December 1971 a battalion of the Grenadiers was given the task of establishing a bridgehead across the Basantar river in the Shakargarh Sector. Major Hoshiar Singh was commanding the left forward company and he was ordered to capture the enemy locality of Jarpal. This was a well-fortified position and was held in strength by the enemy. During the assault, his company came under intense shelling and effective crossfire from enemy medium machine guns. Undeterred, he led the charge and captured the objective after a fierce hand-to hand fight. The enemy reacted and put in three counter attacks on 16 December 1971, two of them supported by armour, Major Hoshiar Singh unmindful of the heavy shelling and tank fire went from trench to trench, motivating his command and encouraging his men to stand fast and fight. Inspired by his courage and dauntless leadership, his company repulsed all the attacks inflicting heavy casualties on the enemy. Again, on 17 December 1971 the enemy made another attack with a battalion supported by heavy artillery fire. Though seriously wounded by enemy shelling, Major Hoshiar Singh again went from trench to trench moving about in the open with utter disregard to his personal safety when an enemy shell landed near the medium machine gun post injuring the crew and rendering it inoperative. Major Hoshiar Singh, realizing the importance of machine-gun fire, immediately rushed to the machine-gun pit and though seriously wounded himself, manned the gun inflicting heavy casualties on the enemy. The attack was successfully repulsed and the enemy retreated leaving behind 85 dead including their Commanding Officer and three other officers. Though seriously wounded, Major Hoshiar Singh refused to be evacuated till the ceasefire.

Throughout this operation, Major Hoshiar Singh displayed most conspicuous gallantry, indomitable fighting spirit and leadership in the highest traditions of the Army.

== Later career ==
Singh was promoted to substantive major on 30 June 1976, subsequently serving for two years as an instructor at the Officers Training School, Madras (now Chennai). In 1981 he was posted as an Instructor at the Indian Military Academy, Dehra Dun, and was promoted to lieutenant-colonel on 8 April 1983, he eventually rose to command of his battalion. Having reached retirement age for his rank, Singh retired from the army on 31 May 1988 with the honorary rank of colonel.

== Retirement and Death ==
Dahiya settled in Jaipur after retirement, but frequently visited his village of Sisana and successfully encouraged many residents to join the armed forces. He died from a cardiac arrest on 6 December 1998, aged 62, and was cremated with full military honors at Jaipur. He was survived by three sons, two of whom followed their father into the army as commissioned officers in the Grenadiers, with one joining the 3rd Grenadiers.

== In popular culture ==
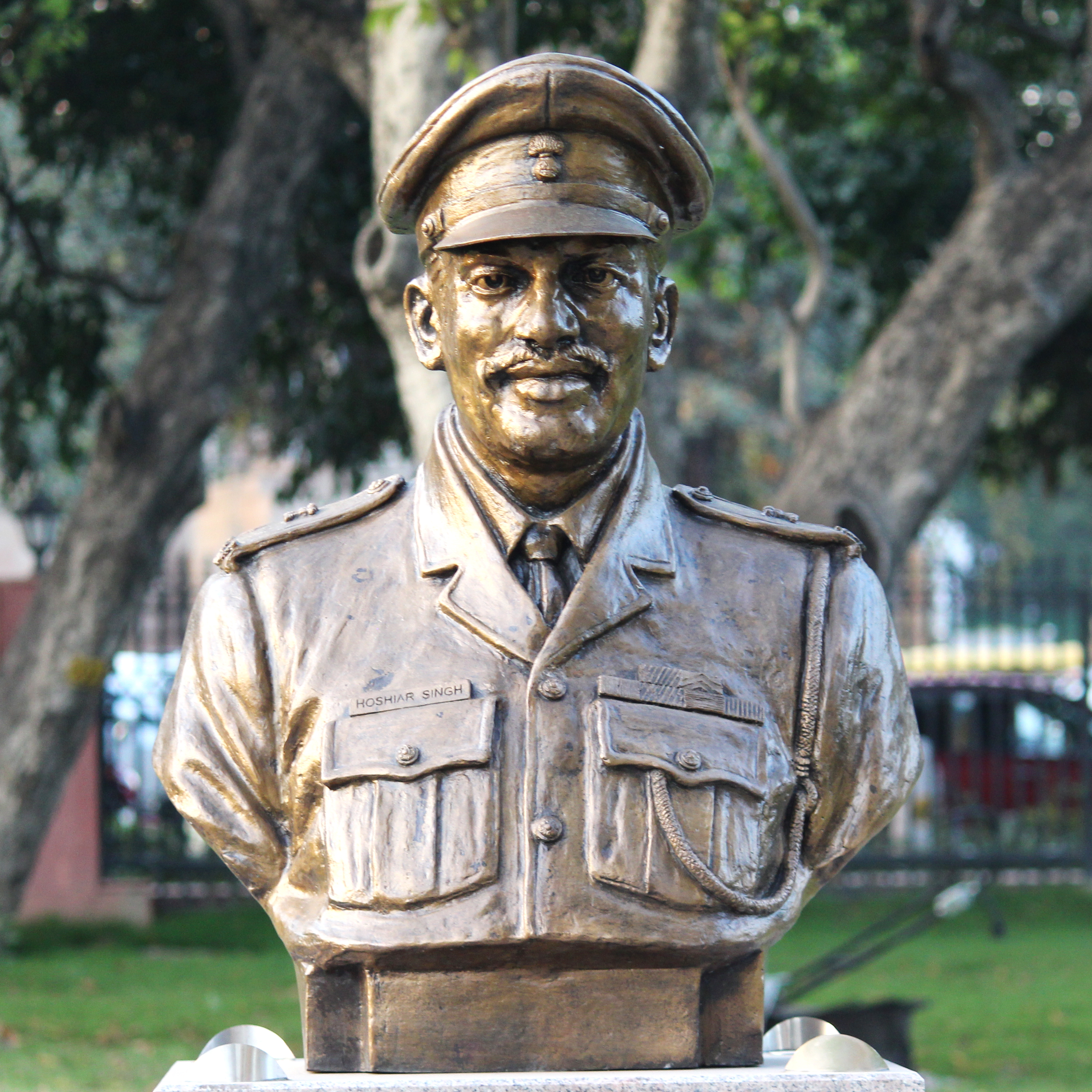
Dahiya's statue at Param Yodha Sthal, National War Memorial, New Delhi

Varun Dhawan played the role of Hoshiar Singh in the Hindi film Border 2, a sequel to the 1997 film Border.

Mohanlal reprised Major Hoshiar Singh's character as Major Sahadevan in the 2017 Malayalam film, 1971: Beyond Borders.

Mangal Dhillon was cast as Major Hoshiar Singh in the tele-serial Param Vir Chakra aired on Doordarshan in the 1980s

== See also ==
- Battle of Basantar
