= IGP (e-gifting retailer) =

Indian multinational e-commerce company

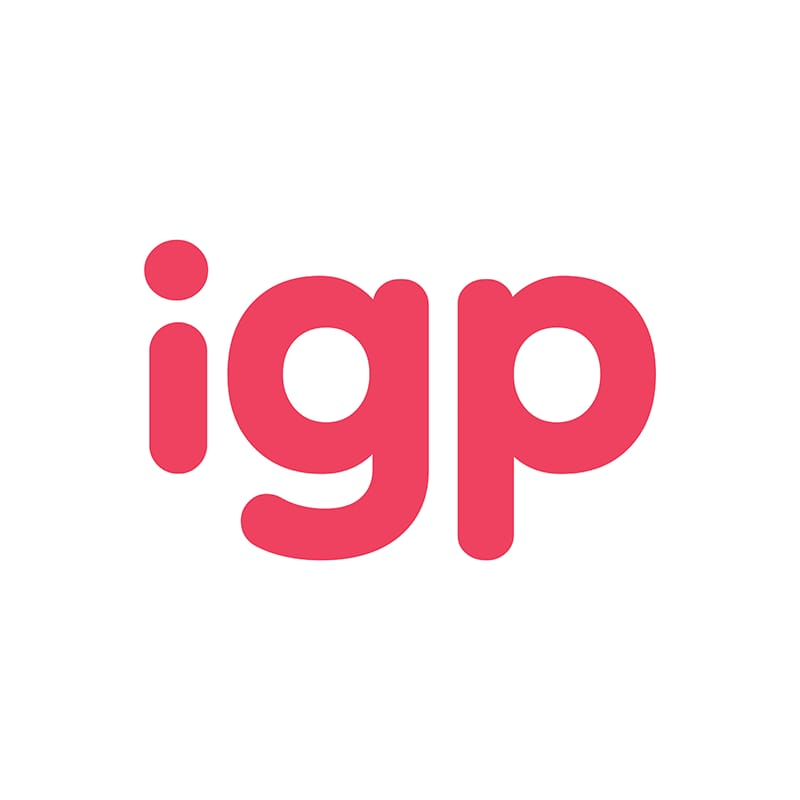
- Type: Private company
- Industry: E-Commerce
- Founded: 2016
- Founder: Tarun Joshi
- Headquarters: Mumbai, India
- Number of locations: 50 in Indian cities, 1 in USA
- Area served: Worldwide
- Key people: Tarun Joshi (Founder & CEO); Priyesh Neema (CPO)
- Revenue: ▲US$30 million (2020)
- Number of employees: 300
- Website: www.igp.com ae.igp.com

IGP is an India-based online retailer of personalized, floral, gourmet, and handmade gifting products, as well as a distribution company, founded by Tarun Joshi in 2017. The company is headquartered in Mumbai, India, and operates in India, Singapore and UAE.

== History ==
IGP was founded in 1999 and acquired by Indian entrepreneur and investor Tarun Joshi in 2012. In 2015, the company acquired ArtisanGilt, an e-commerce portal for ethnic wear and fashion jewellery.

In 2017, the company launched an online gift discovery platform that provides context-based search allowing users to discover a particular gift, based on parameters such as recipient, relationship, occasion and personality. It is India's first gift discovery platform according to Business Standard. In February 2024, the company launched its new retail store in Bandra West, Vashi, & Breach Candy. IGP, a global direct-to-consumer gifting platform, partnered with Maddock Films to create a limited-edition co-branded planter inspired by Khetarpal’s values of bravery, resilience, and duty. Each planter has artwork, a self-watering pot, a hardy snake plant, and soil from the Arun Khetarpal memorial at The Lawrence School, Sanawar as a living tribute to Arun Khetarpal’s legacy.

== Partnership ==
In October 2017, Interflora, a global flower delivery network opened its first office in Mumbai in partnership with IGP. In July 2019, IGP formed a partnership with The Womb as a part of their business and brand growth journey.

=== Celebrity collaboration ===
In January 2023, IGP partnered with Bollywood actress Ananya Panday for Valentine's Day. Subsequently, in May 2023, the company entered into a collaboration with Bollywood actress Kajol for Mother's Day. In July 2023, the company teamed up with the Indian actress, Pooja Hegde, for a Rakhsha Bandhan campaign.

IGP was the official gifting partner of the Akshay Kumar starrer Rakshabandhan movie.

== Funding ==
In October 2016, IGP raised $2 million (₹13 crore approx) in seed funding. The round was led by angel investors Naveen Arya, promoter, Karamchand Appliances and Tarun Joshi, Director, PE firm, 3i.

In December 2017, the company raised an undisclosed amount of Pre Series A funding led by Venture Catalysts.

In February 2022, the company secured $10 million in a Series A funding round led by DSG Consumer Partners, Rajiv Dadlani Group, 9Unicorns and Venture Catalysts. Additionally, in September of the same year, IGP received $23.5 million in its Series B funding round, with Motilal Oswal Alternate Investment Advisors (MO Alts).

== Awards and recognition ==
2023: IGP was awarded the Guinness World Record for creating the longest chain of bracelets in the form of Rakhis.

== See also ==
- Archies (company)
- Etsy
- 1-800-Flowers
