= Sanjay Chauhan =

Sanjay Chauhan may refer to:

- Sanjay Chauhan (politician), mayor of Shimla Municipal Corporation
- Sanjay Chauhan (screenwriter) (1962–2022), Indian screenwriter
- Sanjay Chauhan (cricketer) (born 1966), Indian businessman and cricketer
- Sanjay Singh Chauhan (1961–2014), Gujjar leader
- Sanjay Puran Singh Chauhan (born 1975), Indian film director and screenwriter
- Sanjay Chauhan (soldier), Indian military captain who participated in 1994 Operation Rakshak
- Lieutenant General Sanjay Chauhan, see List of serving generals of the Indian Army

== See also ==
- Sanjay (disambiguation)
- Chauhan
