= Raj Mohan Vohra =

Indian military officer (1932–2020)

Lieutenant General R M Vohra PVSM MVC
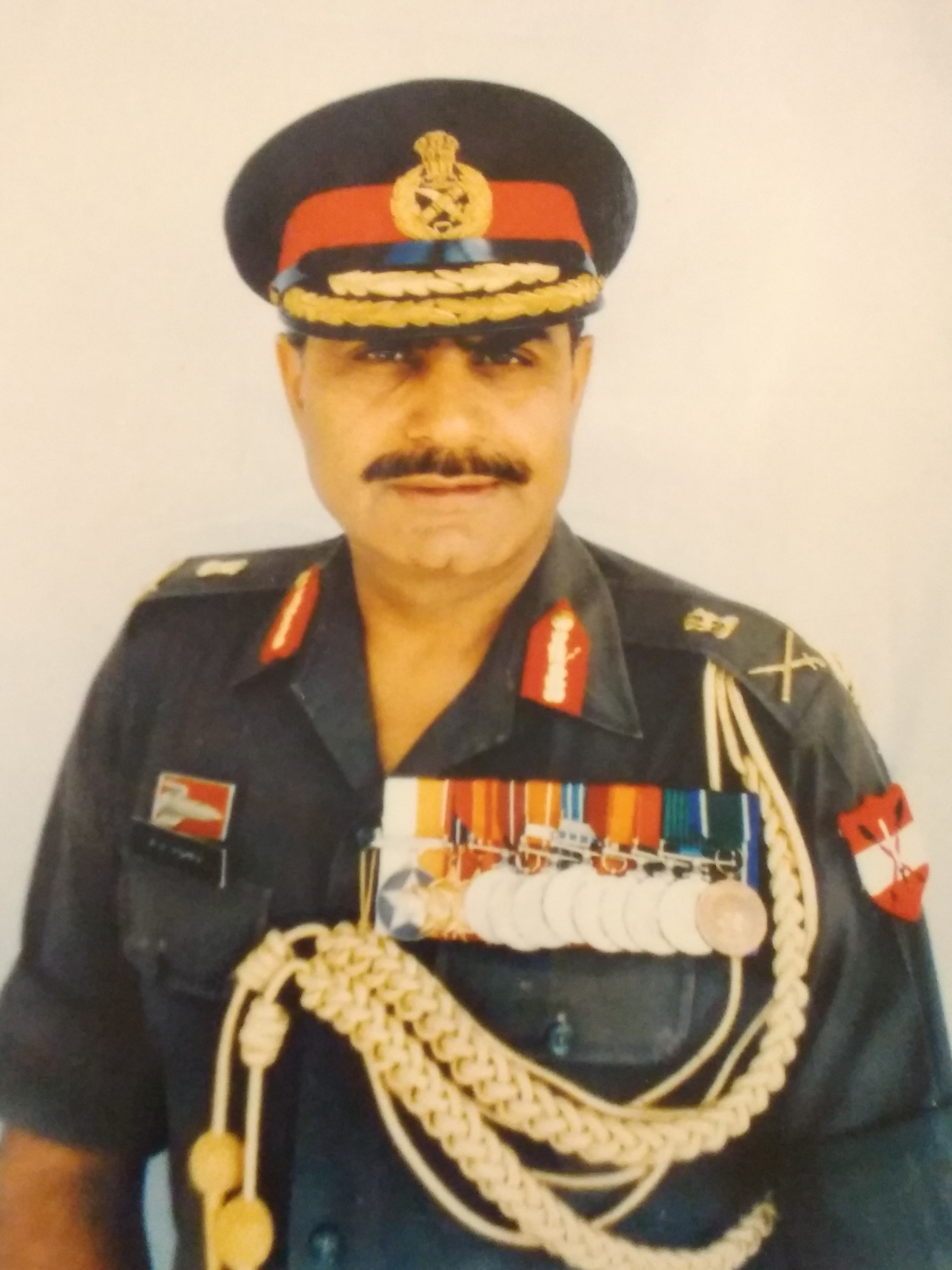
- Born: 7 May 1932; Simla, Punjab Province, British India
- Died: 14 June 2020 (aged 88); New Delhi, Delhi, India
- Alma mater: St. Edward's School; Military Training; Indian Military Academy
- Military career
- Allegiance: India
- Branch: Indian Army
- Service years: 1952–1990
- Rank: Lieutenant General
- Service number: IC-6121
- Units: 14th Horse (Scinde Horse); 4th Horse (Hodson's Horse)
- Commands: Eastern Army; 4th Horse
- Conflicts: Indo-Pakistan War of 1965; Indo-Pakistani War of 1971
- Awards: Param Vishisht Seva Medal; Maha Vir Chakra

Lieutenant General Raj Mohan Vohra, PVSM MVC (7 May 1932 – 14 June 2020) was a General Officer of the Indian Army. He was awarded the Maha Vir Chakra for his bravery and leadership in the Battle of Basantar during the Indo-Pakistani War of 1971.

== Early life and education ==
Vohra was born on 7 May 1932 in Shimla, Himachal Pradesh, India to Bakshi Sant Ram. He attended St. Edward's School in Shimla. He had four brothers, all of whom joined the Indian Army. They all served in the Indian Armoured Corps as well. All the brothers rose to be General Officers – two Major Generals and two Lieutenant Generals.

== Career ==
Vohra was commissioned into 14 Horse on 4 December 1952. As a major, in 1963, he was selected to attend the Defence Services Staff College, Wellington. During the Indo-Pakistani War of 1965, he fought in the Punjab sector.

=== Indo-Pakistani War of 1971 ===
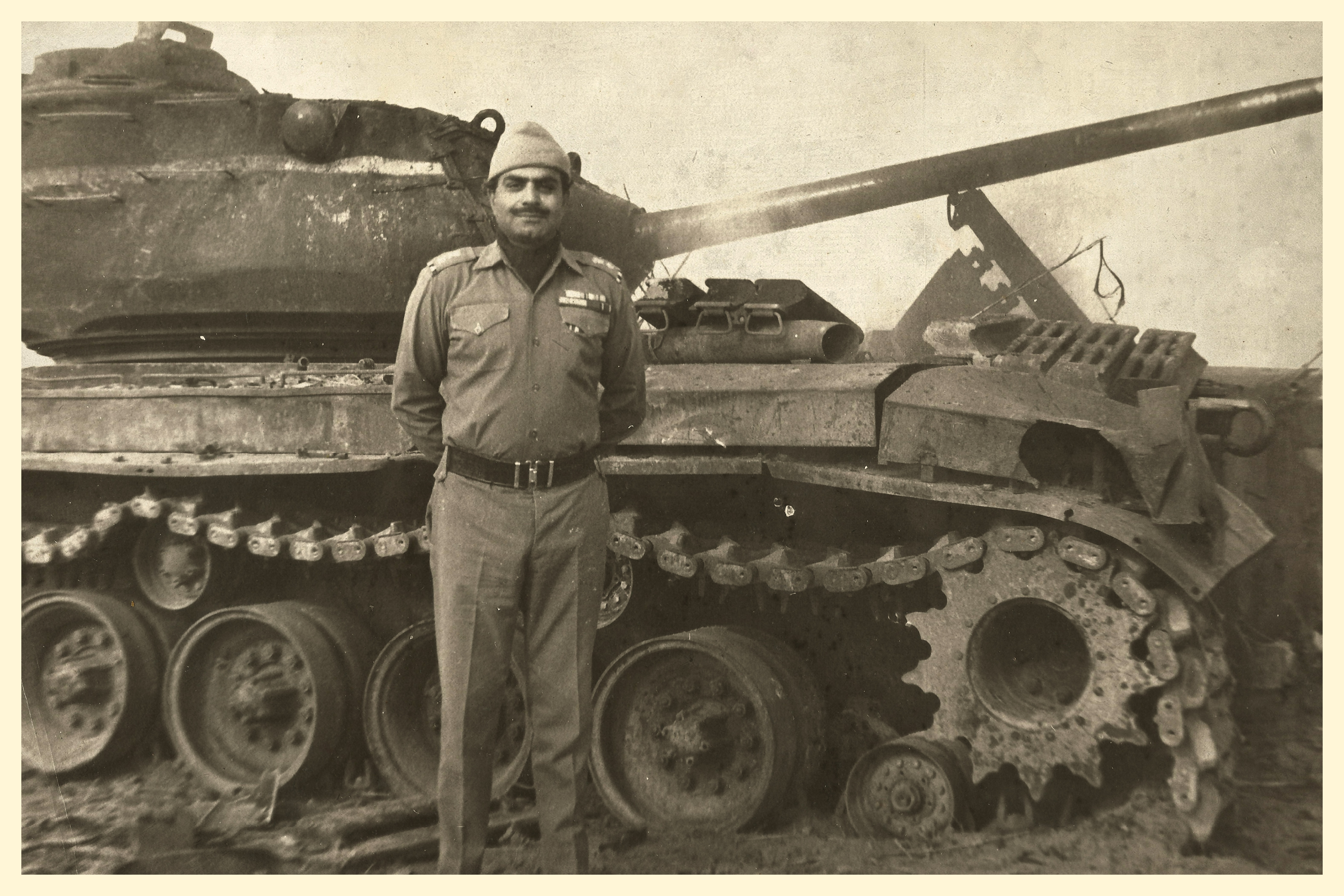
Vohra posing in front of a destroyed Pakistani Patton tank

As a lieutenant colonel, he commanded the 4 Horse in Shakargarh sector during the Indo-Pakistani War of 1971.

On 5 December, his regiment spearheaded the advance of the 54th Infantry Division, commanded by Major General WAG Pinto, and captured well protected important positions such as Bhairo Nath, Bari Lagwal, Chamrola, Dharman, Chakra and Dehlra. During the Battle of Basantar, his regiment came under heavy fire from the enemy and faced heavy resistance but destroyed 27 enemy tanks. His unit suffered little casualties and faced repeated attacks from the enemy. He was awarded the Maha Vir Chakra for his bravery and leadership.

=== Maha Vir Chakra ===
The citation for the Maha Vir Chakra reads as follows:

Gazette Notification: 18 Pres/72,12-2-72

Operation: 1971 Cactus Lily Date of Award: 16 Dec 1971

CITATION

LIEUTENANT COLONEL RAJ MOHAN VOHRA (IC-6121)

4 HORSE

Lieutenant Colonel Raj Mohan Vohra was commanding 4 Horse in the Shakargarh Sector of the western front. His regiment spearheaded the advance capturing. in its wake Bhairo Nath, Thakurdwara, Bari Lagwal, Chamrola, Darman, Chakra and Dehlra. Each of these positions was fortified with tanks, missiles and minefields. With complete disregard for his personal safety, Lieutenant Colonel Vohra moved well forward and provided inspiring leadership to the regiment. During the battle of Basantar River, his regiment, inspired by his personal example and courage, stood fast against repeated attacks by the enemy armour and destroyed 27 enemy tanks with minimal casualties to the unit.

Throughout the operations, Lieutenant Colonel Vohra displayed conspicuous gallantry and inspiring leadership in keeping with the highest traditions of the Army.

As a General Officer, Vohra commanded the Army War College, Mhow (then called College of Combat), which was also commanded by his brother, Inder Mohan Vohra. Vohra served as the General Officer Commanding-in-Chief of the Eastern Command from 1988 to 1990.

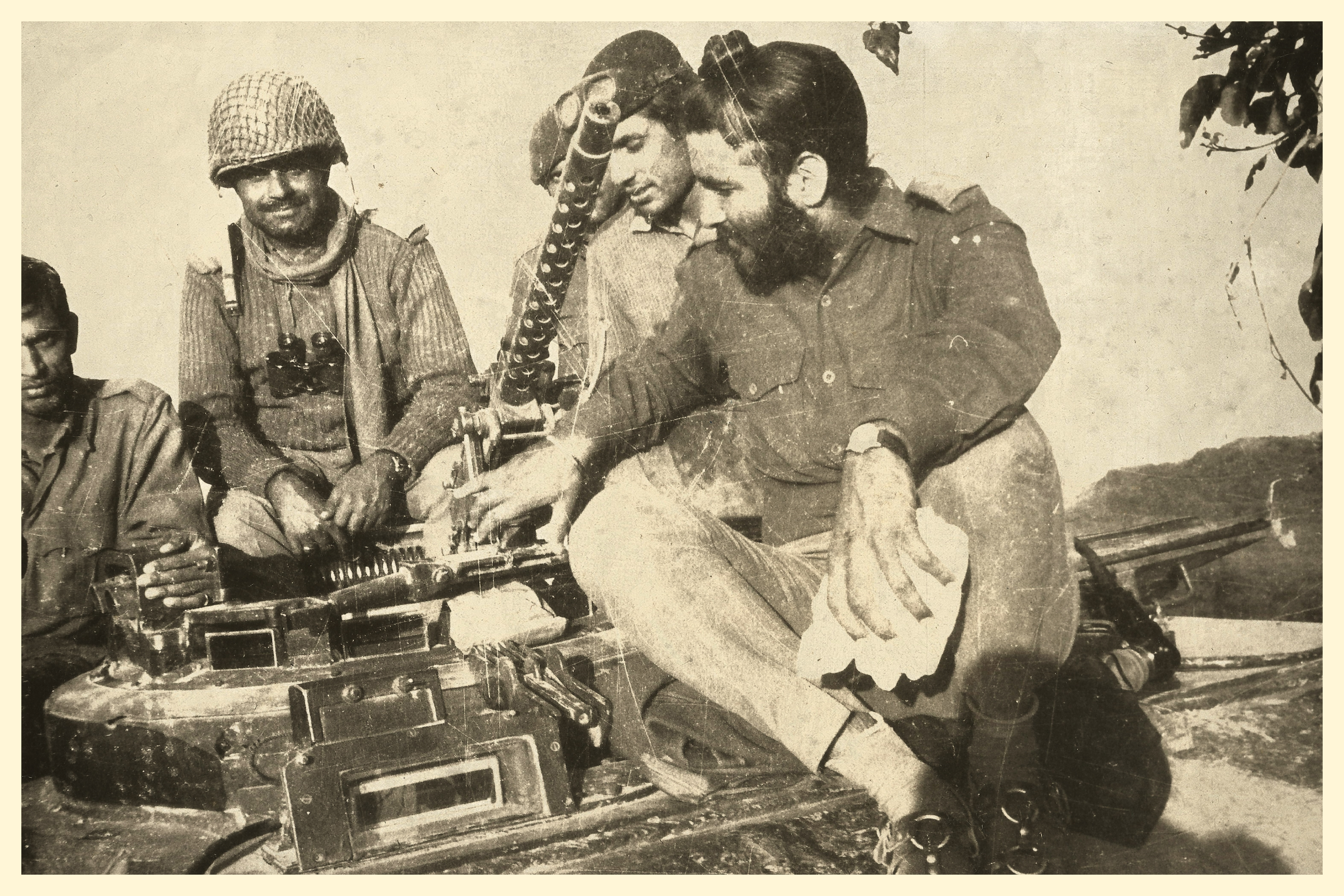
L-R (Tank driver, Lt. Col. RM Vohra, Lt. Butalia, Capt. RS Dhillon)

== Honours and decorations ==

Param Vishisht Seva Medal		Maha Vir Chakra	
ONUC	Samanya Seva Medal	Samar Seva Star	Paschimi Star
Raksha Medal	Sangram Medal	Sainya Seva Medal	Videsh Seva Medal
25th Anniversary Independence medal	30 Years Long Service Medal	20 Years Long Service Medal	9 Years Long Service Medal

== Death ==
He died on 14 June 2020 from COVID-19 during the COVID-19 pandemic in India.

Military offices
Preceded by Vishwa Nath Sharma	General Officer Commanding-in-Chief Eastern Command; 1988–1990	Succeeded by Kuldip Singh Brar
