= 4th Regiment of Horse =

4th Regiment of Horse or 4th Horse may refer to:

- 3rd Dragoon Guards, British Army, ranked as 4th Horse from 1685 to 1746
- 7th Dragoon Guards, British Army, ranked as 4th Irish Horse from 1746 to 1788
- 4th Royal Irish Dragoon Guards, British Army, so called 1788 to 1922
- 4th Horse (Hodson's Horse), Indian Army
