= 54th Infantry Division (India) =

Indian Army infantry division

- Founded: 01 October 1966; 60 years ago
- Country: India
- Branch: Indian Army
- Type: Infantry
- Role: Amphibious warfare
- Size: Division
- Part of: XXI Corps
- Garrison/HQ: Secunderabad
- Nicknames: Bison Division; Bash On Regardless Division
- Motto: Bash On Regardless
- Mascot: The Gaur (The Indian Bison)
- Engagements: Indo-Pakistani War of 1971; Operation Pawan; Operation Blue Star; Kargil War; Operation Parakram

Commanders
- Current commander: Major General RD Sharma
- Notable commanders: Lt Gen WAG Pinto; Lt Gen Zameer Uddin Shah; Lt Gen Cherish Mathson; Lt Gen Anil Chait; Lt Gen Manjinder Singh

The 54th Infantry Division is an Infantry division of the Indian Army. The Division was raised as an Infantry Division, but was converted into a Reorganised Amphibious Formation (RAMFOR) in 2011. It is currently the only division of the Indian Army which carries out Amphibious warfare. The division is headquartered at Secunderabad in Telangana and is a part of XXI Corps. The Division is commanded by an Officer of the rank of Major General titled General Officer Commanding (GOC).

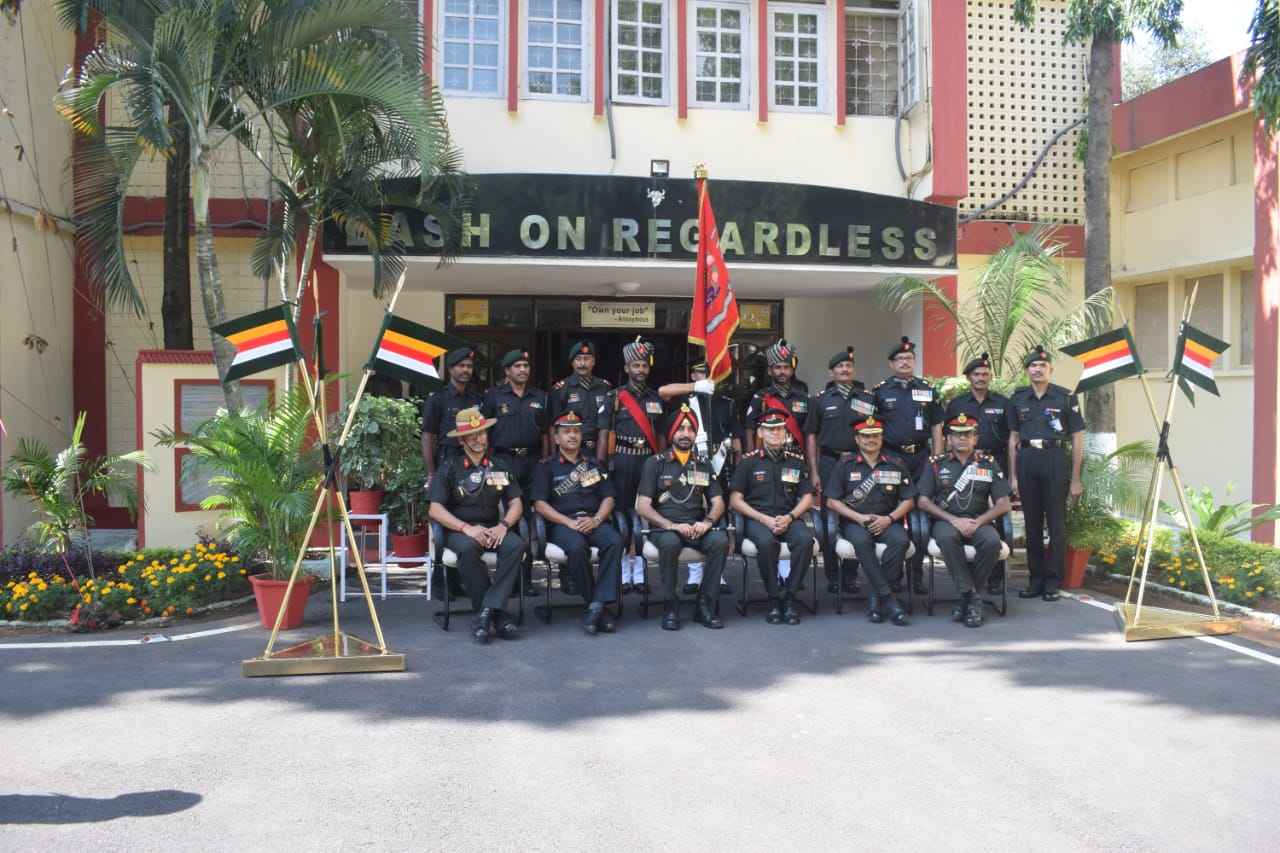
Bison Division celebrating its 56th Raising Day, 1 October 2021.

== History ==
The 54th Infantry Division was raised at Secunderabad on 1 October 1966. Major General SS Maitra, AVSM was the first General Officer Commanding (GOC) the Division. At the time of its raising, the division had three Infantry Brigades and one Artillery Brigade. 47 Infantry Brigade was raised by Brigadier B D Man Singh at Golconda Fort, 91 Infantry Brigade by Brigadier K P Lahiri, VrC at Bolarum and the 54 Artillery Brigade was raised by Brigadier N V Subramaniam at Bowenpally.

=== Order of battle (ORBAT) during raising ===
- 47 Infantry Brigade
  - 20th Bn The Bihar Regt
  - 13th battalion, Jammu and Kashmir Rifles (13 JAKRIF)
  - 5th battalion, 3rd Gorkha Rifles (5/3 GR)
- 91 Infantry Brigade
  - 4th battalion, Madras Regiment (4 Madras)
  - 3rd battalion, Maratha Light Infantry (3 MLI)
  - 2nd battalion, 5th Gorkha Rifles (Frontier Force) (2/5 GR)
- 74 Infantry Brigade
  - 4th battalion, Sikh Light Infantry (4 Sikh LI)
  - 5th battalion, Madras Regiment (5 Madras)
  - 22nd battalion, Maratha Light Infantry (22 MLI)
- 54 Artillery Brigade
  - 7 Field Regiment
  - 141 Field Regiment
  - 6 Medium Regiment
  - 278 Medium Regiment
  - 1889 Light Regiment

== Indo-Pakistani War of 1971 ==
In the event of a war, the 54th Infantry Division was to be part of I Corps, then the only Strike Corps of the Indian Army. The division was commanded by Major General WAG Pinto, the 3rd General Officer Commanding (GOC). The division moved from its peacetime location in Secunderabad to its operational location in the Punjab and was ready by mid-September 1971.

=== ORBAT ===
The ORBAT of the division during the Indo-Pakistani War of 1971 was:

- Divisional Reserves
  - 45 AD Regiment
  - 6th battalion, Madras Regiment (6 Madras)
  - 9 Engineer Regiment (Lt Col B T Pandit)
- 47 Infantry Brigade (Brigadier A P Bhardwaj)
  - 16th battalion, Madras Regiment (Lt Col V P Ghai)
  - 16th battalion, Dogra Regiment (16 Dogra)
  - 3rd battalion, The Grenadiers (Lt Col V P Airy)
- 74 Infantry Brigade (Brigadier Ujaggar Singh)
  - 8th battalion, The Grenadiers (8 Granadiers)
  - 6th battalion, Kumaon Regiment (6 Kumaon)
  - 9th battalion, Maratha Light Infantry (9 MLI)
- 91 Infantry Brigade (Brigadier A K Handoo)
  - 3rd battalion, Garhwal Rifles (3 Garh Rif)
  - 3rd battalion, 1st Gorkha Rifles (The Malaun Regiment) (3/1 GR)
- 16 (Independent) Armoured Brigade (Brigadier A S Vaidya MVC)
  - 4th Horse (Hodson's Horse) (Lt Col R M Vohra)
  - 16th Light Cavalry (Lt Col Mahindra Singh)
  - 17 Horse (Poona Horse) (Lt Col Hanut Singh)
  - 75 Medium Regiment (Lt Col K N Thadani)
  - 18th battalion, Rajputana Rifles (18 Raj Rif)
  - 90 (Independent) Reconnaissance Squadron (AMX-13)
- 54 Artillery Brigade (Brigadier Avtar Singh)
  - 69 Field Regiment
  - 161 Field Regiment
  - 162 Field Regiment (Lt Col A K Bhandari)
  - 44 Light Regiment
  - 70 Medium Regiment
- 41 (Independent) Artillery Brigade

The tasks allotted to the Division were:

- Carry out offensive operations based upon Galar with the ultimate aim of capturing Zafarwal and Dhamtal.
- While doing so, capture Darman, Bari, Laisar Kalan, Supwal Ditch and Badwal. Be prepared to capture Deoli and Mirzapur, if required. This meant that the Division was to operate between the Degh Nadi and the Karir Nadi.

The Pakistani forces opposite the Division consisted of elements of the 8th Infantry Division. The 24 Infantry Brigade with four battalions (11 Baloch which held the Supwal ditch, 40 Punjab which was deployed east of the Karir Nadi, 24 Punjab which was defending the Basantar Nala), a brigade in Zafarwal area and Reconnaissance elements of 21 Baloch. Apart from these infantry units, Pakistani armour consisted of the 8 Armoured Brigade which had 13th Lancers, 31 Cavalry and 27 Cavalry under it, equipped with M47 Patton and M48 Patton tanks.

The Division crossed the border as planned at 2000 hrs on 6 December and captured the border outposts at Chamnakhurd, Danadout, Galar Tanda, Chak Jangu, Dhandhar, Mukhwal and Buru Chakby 0230 hrs 7 December.

=== Battle of Basantar ===
GOC 54 Inf Div Maj Gen WAG Pinto about the Division's performance during the war

"At 2000 hrs that night, the ceasefire was honoured by both sides and became effective. The guns were silent and an eerie calm pervaded over the bitterly cold night. It was a strange feeling, the sudden peace and quiet after the unending din and noise of the past fourteen days. Most of us were taken aback and felt lost. But, we couldn't waste time on this. We still had our hands full and soon got busy in dominating and securing every inch of the 388 square kilometers, which we had captured and over which the National Flag as well as the Divisional Flag proudly flew."

—

The Battle of Basantar was among the most vital battles in the war. It was one of the greatest tank battles fought by the Indian Army. The Division had the 47 Infantry Brigade, 91 Infantry Brigade and the 74 Infantry Brigade, Poona Horse, one squadron of Hodson's Horse and 75 Medium Regiment. The date for the Basantar crossing was fixed for night 14/15 December, but was postponed by 24 hours by Gen Pinto. The Battle of Basantar was a decisive Indian victory.

The 47 Infantry Brigade was christened Basantar Brigade after the war.

In what is an Indian Army record, the 54th Infantry Division won as many as 196 gallantry medals in just 14 days of fierce fighting. These include 2 Param Vir Chakras, 9 Mahavir Chakras and 4 Vir Chakra. The GOC, Major General WAG Pinto was awarded the Param Vishisht Seva Medal.

The Division remained in Pakistan until the Simla Agreement, after which it moved back to Secunderabad in March 1973. A war trophy - a disabled Pakistani M47 Patton Tank was gifted by the Division to the Government of Andhra Pradesh and had it installed on the Tank Bund Road, Hyderabad.

== Awards and honours ==
Key
†	Indicates posthumous honour

Award	Rank	Name	Unit	References
Param Vir Chakra	Second Lieutenant	Arun Khetarpal †	17 Poona Horse	
Param Vir Chakra	Major	Hoshiar Singh Dahiya	3 Grenadiers	
Mahavir Chakra	Lieutenant Colonel	Hanut Singh	17 Poona Horse	
Mahavir Chakra	Lieutenant Colonel	V P Airy	3 Grenadiers	
Mahavir Chakra	Lieutenant Colonel	V P Ghai †	16 Madras	
Mahavir Chakra	Lieutenant Colonel	Raj Mohan Vohra	4 Horse	
Mahavir Chakra	Major	Amarjit Singh Bal	17 Poona Horse	
Mahavir Chakra	Major	D V Singh	8 Grenadiers	
Mahavir Chakra	Major	Vijay Rattan Choudhry †	9 Engineer Regiment	
Mahavir Chakra	Havildar	Thomas Philipose	16 Madras	
Vir Chakra	Lieutenant Colonel	B T Pandit	9 Engineer Regiment	
Vir Chakra	Captain	Satish Chander Sehgal †	75 Medium Regiment	
Vir Chakra	Captain	Ravinder Nath Gupta †	9 Engineer Regiment	
Vir Chakra	Naib Subedar	Dorai Swamy	9 Engineer Regiment	

== Operation Pawan ==
The Division, led by Major General Harkirat Singh, was the first formation to be inducted into Sri Lanka as part of the Indian Peace Keeping Force (IPKF). The Division was grouped with a Mechanised Infantry battalion, a Squadron of Armour and an Air Operation Flight.

=== ORBAT ===
- Divisional Reserves
  - 10th battalion, Para Commando (10 Para Cdo)
  - 65 Armoured Regiment
- 91 Infantry Brigade
  - 5th battalion, Madras Regiment (5 Madras)
  - 8th battalion, Mahar Regiment (8 Mahar)
  - 1st battalion, Maratha Light Infantry (1 MLI)
- 76 Infantry Brigade
- 41 Infantry Brigade
- 93 Field Regiment
- 831 Light Regiment

The Division was in Sri Lanka for over two and a half years and was de-inducted on 20 March 1990.

=== Awards and honours ===
During Operation Pawan, the Division earned a total of 471 awards including 1 Param Vir Chakra, 3 Mahavir Chakras, 4 Uttam Yudh Seva Medals and 32 Vir Chakras.

Award	Rank	Name	Unit	References
Param Vir Chakra	Major	Ramaswamy Parameshwaran	8 Mahar	
Mahavir Chakra	Brigadier	Manjit Singh	41 Infantry Brigade	
Mahavir Chakra	Colonel	Inder Bal Singh Bawa	4/5 Gorkha Rifles	
Mahavir Chakra	Major	Puttichanda Somaiah Ganapathi	8 Mahar	

== Other Operations ==
- Operation Parakram
- Internal security duties during the 1990 Mandal Commission protests and 2002 Gujarat riots.
- Humanitarian assistance - Operation Sahayta, Operation Sea Waves, Operation Madad, Operation Megh, Operation, Operation Lehar and Operation Hudhud.

== General Officers Commanding ==
S.No.	Name	Assumed office	Left office
1	Major General S S Maitra AVSM	1966	1969
2	Major General K.A.S. Raja PVSM	1969	1971
3	Major General WAG Pinto PVSM	1971	1974
4	Major General K S Bajwa	1974	1976
5	Major General M L Tuli	1976	1977
6	Major General A K Handoo	1977	1979
7	Major General D S C Rai	1979	1981
8	Major General G K Sen	1981	1983
9	Major General Shamsher Singh SM	1983	1985
10	Major General V K Singh	1985	1987
11	Major General Harkirat Singh	1987	1988
12	Major General S C Sardeshpande UYSM, AVSM	1988	1989
13	Major General R N Bhalla VSM	1989	1990
14	Major General M M Lakhera AVSM, VSM	1990	1992
15	Major General B N Kapur	1992	1994
16	Major General S P S Kanwar AVSM, VSM	1994	1996
17	Major General Mahesh Vij	1996	1998
18	Major General Basant Singh YSM	1998	2000
19	Major General S Pattabhiraman SM, VSM	2000	2001
20	Major General Zameer Uddin Shah VSM	2001	2003
21	Major General K S Siva Kumar VSM	2003	2004
22	Major General S P S Dhillon VSM	2004	2005
23	Major General S P Rai VSM	2005	2006
24	Major General Anil Chait AVSM, VSM	2006	2008
25	Major General Rajesh Singh	2008	2009
26	Major General R C Chadha	2009	2011
27	Major General Amit Sharma	2011	2012
28	Major General Cherish Mathson SM, VSM	2012	2013
29	Major General R K Jagga	2014	2015
30	Major General R S Mann VSM	2015	2016
31	Major General Satish N Wasade	2016	2017
32	Major General B D Rai YSM	2017	2018
33	Major General Manjinder Singh	2018	2020
34	Major General Alok Joshi	2020	2021
35	Major General PP Singh	2021	2022
36	Major General R K Suresh SC&bar, SM	2022	2024
37	Major General Akhilesh Kumar SM	2024	2025
38	Major General RD Sharma	2025	Incumbent

== See also ==
- List of military divisions
- Indian Peace Keeping Force
- Indo-Pakistani War of 1971
