= 69 Medium Regiment (India) =

Indian Army artillery unit

- Active: 1963 – present
- Country: India
- Allegiance: India
- Branch: Indian Army
- Type: Artillery
- Size: Regiment
- Nickname: 69 Very Fine
- Mottos: Sarvatra, Izzat-O-Iqbal (Everywhere with Honour and Glory).
- Colors: Red & Navy Blue
- Anniversaries: 1 February – Raising Day

Insignia
- Abbreviation: 69 Med Regt

The 69 Medium Regiment is part of the Regiment of Artillery of the Indian Army.

== Formation ==
The regiment was raised on 1 February 1963 at Jalandhar Cantonment as the 69 Field Regiment. The first commanding officer was Lieutenant Colonel P K H Chand. The regiment was subsequently converted to a medium regiment in April 2010.

== Operations ==
The regiment has taken part in the following operations.

=== Indo-Pakistani War of 1965 ===
The regiment took part in Operation Ablaze and Operation Riddle in Punjab, as part of the 14th Infantry Division, during the Indo-Pakistani War of 1965.

=== Nathu La clashes ===
The regiment provided effective artillery fire during the Nathu La and Cho La clashes with the People's Liberation Army in 1967. The gun area of the unit was visited by then Prime Minister Indira Gandhi in May 1968.

=== Indo-Pakistani War of 1971 ===
The regiment was part of 54 Artillery Brigade of the 54 Infantry Division. It was deployed in the western sector around Samba during Operation Cactus Lily. The Regiment won two awards for its service in the war:

- Sena Medal – Captain Madan Mohan Sharmrao Gadagkar, and Captain Asit Chaudhuri.
- Mentioned in dispatches – Major Gopal Kartic, Captain Mela Ram Sharma, Subedar Ramchand Shinde, Lance Naik Kalla Venkata Ratnam, Lance Naik Ram Bapu Pawar, and Naik Sitaram Deshmukh.

=== Operation Blue Star ===
The regiment provided aid to the civil administration in Punjab during Operation Blue Star in 1984.

=== Operation Brasstacks ===
The regiment deployed in Rajasthan for Operation Brasstacks in 1987.

=== Operation Falcon ===
In Operation Falcon during the Sumdorong Chu standoff, the regiment was deployed between 1987 and 1990 in the Eastern sector.

During this tenure, Captain (later Major General) Virender Kumar Yadav of the regiment was awarded the Shaurya Chakra for an act of bravery. On 11 November 1989, while traveling by train, he displayed conspicuous courage under grave threat to his own life and rescued many people when a large mob set fire to the North East Express at Phaphund.

=== Operation Rakshak and Operation Vijay ===
During and after the incident in Lachimpora, the regiment took part in counter-insurgency operations in Jammu and Kashmir and has successfully completed three tenures in the state (1994, 1999 and 2007). It was also mobilized in the Kargil War.

=== Operation Parakram ===
The regiment was deployed in the Northern Command area during the 2001-2002 India-Pakistan standoff in 2001. It lost a young officer, Lieutenant Abhay Pareek on 10 June 2002. On 31 July 2002, the regiment also lost Captain Rapolu Veera Raja Reddy at Rajouri in anti-militancy operations.

== Honors and achievements ==
The regiment has been awarded the following awards –

- Shaurya Chakra – 1
- Sena Medal – 3
- Mentioned in dispatches – 6
- COAS Commendation Cards – 3
- GOC-in-C Commendation Cards – 5

== See also ==
- List of artillery regiments of Indian Army
