= K.A.S. Raja =

Indian military officer

Kottimukula Alagaraja Singaparaja Raja, known as K. A. S. Raja, was an Indian military officer.

== Early life ==
K. A. S. Raja was born to a politically prominent family from Madras, India. He was a nephew of P. S. Kumaraswamy Raja, who served as the Chief Minister of Madras Presidency and Governor of Orissa.

== Military career ==
On 17 June 1940 Raja enlisted in the ranks of the 11th (Madras) Battalion, Indian Territorial Force then on 28 July 1940 was granted a viceroy's commission in the rank of Jemadar in the same unit. The battalion was converted to a regular battalion of the British Indian Army on 15 September 1941 titled the 1st Battalion, 3rd Madras Regiment. On 21 December 1941 Raja received an emergency commission as a Second Lieutenant in the 3rd Madras Regiment in the British Indian Army.

Raja fought in the Burma campaign and qualified as a paratrooper, choosing to wear a parachutist badge throughout the rest of his career. Following the end of the war, he studied at a military staff college in India. In 1946 he was granted a regular Indian Army commission. Following India's independence in 1947, he was made commander of a battalion in the Indian Army. He commanded the 1st Battalion of the Madras Regiment with the rank of Lieutenant Colonel during the Indo-Pakistani War of 1947–1948.

In the spring of 1961 Raja led a 4,500 strong contingent, the Indian Independent Brigade Group, to the Republic of the Congo to serve as a peacekeeping force in the United Nations Operation in the Congo (ONUC). On 5 August 1961 ONUC created an independent Katanga Command under Raja headquartered in Élisabethville. On 28 August he led ONUC forces in conducting Operation Rum Punch, and action to detain and deport mercenaries and foreign military personnel serving in the Katangese Gendarmerie. He returned to India with his brigade in April 1962.

== Legacy ==
In the 2016 film The Siege of Jadotville, based on the events of the Siege of Jadotville and concurrent Operation Morthor in September 1961, Raja's role is portrayed by the character General Raja.

== Works cited ==
- Colvin, Ian Goodhope (1968). The rise and fall of Moise Tshombe: a biography. London: Ferwin. ISBN 9780090876501. OCLC 752436625.
- Mockaitis, Thomas R. (1999). Peace Operations and Intrastate Conflict: The Sword Or the Olive Branch? (illustrated ed.). Greenwood Publishing Group. ISBN 9780275961732.

Military offices
Preceded by S. S. Maitra	General Officer Commanding 54 Infantry Division; 1969 - 1971	Succeeded by WAG Pinto
