= 61 Medium Regiment (India) =

Indian Army artillery unit

- Active: 1962 – present
- Country: India
- Allegiance: India
- Branch: Indian Army
- Type: Artillery
- Size: Regiment
- Nickname(s): Thambi Tigers
- Motto(s): Sarvatra, Izzat-O-Iqbal (Everywhere with Honour and Glory)
- Colors: Red & Navy Blue
- Anniversaries: 1 April– Raising Day

Insignia
- Abbreviation: 61 Med Regt

61 Medium Regiment is part of the Regiment of Artillery of the Indian Army.

== Formation and history ==
The regiment was raised as 61 Field Regiment on 1 April 1962 at Mohamadi Lines, Golconda Fort, Hyderabad. The first commanding officer was Lieutenant Colonel RS Bawa. Following initial training, it was declared fit for operations on 31 March 1963. The regiment shed its S battery to 162 Field Regiment on its formation in 1963. The unit presently consists of 157, 158 and 159 batteries and has been converted to a medium regiment.

== Operations ==
The regiment has taken part in the following operations –

Indo-Pakistani War of 1965

It was posted under 14 Infantry Division during the war. It took part in Operation Chawinda and lost one officer and one other ranks (OR) during the war.

Indo-Pakistani War of 1971

The regiment took part in Operation Cactus Lily in the western front. It lost one OR during the war.

Other operations

- Operation Trident : 1986-1987
- Operation Meghdoot : 1989-1990
- Operation Rakshak II (counter terrorist operations) : 1992-1994
- Operation Vijay : 1999
- Operation Rakshak : counter terrorist operations in Jammu and Kashmir, 2007-2009

== Gallantry awards ==
The regiment has won the following gallantry awards –

- Sena Medal – 4
- Mentioned in dispatches – 2
- Chief of Army Staff Commendation cards – 1
- Vice Chief of Army Staff Commendation cards – 1
- General Officer Commanding in Chief Commendation cards – 12

== War Cry ==
The war cry of the regiment is Velluvom, velluvom, vetrikonde selluvom, which translates to We will win and we will continue to win.

== See also ==
- List of artillery regiments of Indian Army
