= 75 Medium Regiment (India) =

Indian Army artillery unit

- Active: 1966–present
- Country: India
- Allegiance: (India)
- Branch: Indian Army
- Type: Artillery
- Size: Regiment
- Nickname(s): MVC Regiment
- Motto(s): Sarvatra, Izzat-O-Iqbal (Everywhere with Honour and Glory)
- Colors: Red & Navy Blue
- Anniversaries: Raising Day - 18 January; Battle Honour Day - 16 December
- Equipment: 130 mm towed M-46 field guns
- Engagements: Indo-Pakistani War of 1971; Battle of Basantar; Operation Meghdoot; Operation Rakshak; Kargil War; Operation Parakram; Operation Snow Leopard
- Decorations: Maha Vir Chakra 1 Vir Chakra 1 Vishisht Seva Medal 2 Sena Medal 3 Mentioned in Dispatches 3 GOC-in-C Commendation Card 5
- Battle honours: Basantar River

Commanders
- Colonel of the Regiment: Maj Gen BK Guha, VSM
- Notable commanders: Brigadier K N Thadani VSM; Brigadier A N Suryanarayanan; Brigadier JPS Ahluwalia; Major General B K Guha VSM

Insignia
- Abbreviation: 75 Med Regt

75 Medium Regiment is part of the Regiment of Artillery of the Indian Army.

== Formation and history ==
The regiment was raised as 75 Medium Regiment on 18 January 1966 at New Delhi. The unit was equipped with the 130 mm towed M-46 field guns and has always been designated as a medium regiment. The first commanding officer was Lieutenant Colonel Sarvjit Puri.

In addition to the 130 mm towed M-46 field guns, the regiment has also used 5.5-inch howitzers and 155 mm FH 77 B howitzers. The regiment presently consists of headquarters, 751, 752 and 753 medium batteries.

== Class composition ==
At raising, the regiment had a battery each of North Indian Brahmins, Jats and South Indian classes. At present, it is an all India, all class regiment.

== Operations ==
=== Indo-Pakistani War of 1971 ===
During the Operation Cactus Lily, 75 Medium Regiment was equipped with the 130 mm towed M-46 field guns and commanded by Lieutenant Colonel K N Thadani. It saw action in the Shakargarh sector of the western front. The unit was part of the divisional artillery of 54 Infantry Division and was in direct support of its 16 (Independent) Armoured Brigade. The Commanding officer, Observation Post officers, Gun Position officers and all gunners tirelessly provided fire support to the advancing Indian Armour and Infantry during actions at Thakurdwara, Chakra, Jarpal and the Battle of Basantar and engaged enemy targets, inflicting heavy casualties on their enemy. Captain Satish Chander Sehgal and Gunner VK Premachandran were killed in action during the Battle of Basantar.

The Regiment was awarded the battle honour title "Basantar River" in recognition of extraordinary heroism and exemplary combat performance, while in direct support of the 16 (Independent) Armoured Brigade during the war.

=== Operation Meghdoot ===
The regiment has sent number of parties to the Siachen Glacier during Operation Meghdoot. Captain Pratap Singh while gallantly performing duties of Observation Post officer in the protection of Bana post, was killed in action in May 1988. Subsequently, in 2004, Subedar Rajender Pal was awarded the GOC-in-C Northern Command Commendation Card.

=== Operation Rakshak ===
The regiment had three tenures during Operation Rakshak (1987–90, 1990–96 and 2003–05), in Jammu and Kashmir. The regiment carried out trans-LoC firing, establishing company operating base, convoy protection, road opening and protection of pilgrims visiting Amarnath shrine during these tenures.

=== Kargil War ===
During Operation Vijay, the regiment provided a gun battery to 25 Infantry Division Sector, and was kept on stand by for the operation.

=== Operation Parakram ===
When the Indian Army was mobilized in December 2001 during Operation Parakram, so was the regiment. It moved from its peace time location in Ambala, to its operational location in Rajasthan, where it remained till December 2002.

=== Operation Snow Leopard ===
The regiment was mobilized during Operation Snow Leopard and fully deployed at Daulat Beg Oldi, on the Karakoram Pass-Depsang Plains alignment at an altitude of 16,800 feet.

== Gallantry awards ==
- Indo-Pakistan War of 1971
  - Battle Honour - "Basantar River"
  - Vir Chakra - Captain Satish Chander Sehgal (posthumous)
  - Vishisht Seva Medal - Lieutenant Colonel K N Thadani
  - Sena Medal - Major Manmohan Singh Brar
  - Mentioned-in-Dispatches - Captain Madhu Mahbubani, Captain Mohan Krishnan, Subedar Major Mohindar Singh
- Operation Meghdoot
  - Maha Vir Chakra - Captain Pratap Singh (posthumous)
  - GOC-in-C Commendation Card - Subedar Rajender Pal
- Operation Rakshak
  - Sena Medal - 2
  - GOC-in-C Commendation Card - 4

== See also ==
- List of artillery regiments of Indian Army
