= W. A. G. Pinto =

Indian Army General (1924–2021)

Lieutenant General W A G Pinto PVSM
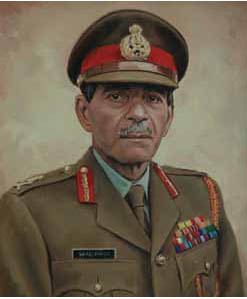
- Pinto as the Commandant, NDC
- Born: 1 July 1924; Poona, Bombay Presidency, British India
- Died: 25 March 2021 (aged 96)
- Military career
- Allegiance: British Indian Empire; India
- Branch: British Indian Army; Indian Army
- Service years: 1943–1982
- Rank: Lieutenant general
- Nickname: WAG
- Units: 13th Frontier Force Rifles; 2 Assam; 3 Guards
- Commands: Central Army; XXXIII Corps; 54 Infantry Division; 66 Mountain Brigade; 4 Guards
- Conflicts: World War II; Sino-Indian War; Indo-Pakistani War of 1971
- Awards: Param Vishisht Seva Medal

Lieutenant General Walter Anthony Gustavo 'WAG' Pinto, PVSM (1 July 1924 – 25 March 2021) was a General Officer in the Indian Army. He last served as the 8th General Officer Commanding-in-Chief of the Central Command. As a major general, he led the 54th Infantry Division on the western front in the Indo-Pakistani War of 1971, for which he was awarded the Param Vishisht Seva Medal.

== Early life and education ==
WAG Pinto was born on 1 July 1924, at Poona, Bombay Presidency, to Alexander Pinto, who worked in the Military Accounts Department, and his wife, Helen Agnes Pinto. Alexander was from the Gustave Pinto branch of the Pintos of Santa Cruz, Goa, which was then part of Portuguese India. Pinto was the youngest of three children. His elder brother, Sydney Alexander, was also an Indian Army Officer who was commissioned in the Corps of Engineers as a Bombay Sapper. He later transferred to the Bengal Sappers, and commanded an Infantry brigade and later 2 Mountain Division. His sister, Phyllis Mary, served in the Women's Auxiliary Corps (India) and later, Burma Shell.

Pinto was schooled in Bangalore, Poona and at St. Aloysius Senior Secondary School, Jabalpur from where he graduated his Senior Cambridge School leaving certificate with 4 Ds (distinctions). He then attended college at Robertson College Jabalpur, where he joined D Company, 10th Nagpur Battalion, University Training Corps (UTC). The UTC was a precursor to the National Cadet Corps (NCC).

== Military career ==
After clearing the Preliminary and Final Selection Boards held at Jabalpur and Lucknow respectively, he joined the Pre-Cadet Course at Datta College, Lahore in January 1943. In March 1943, he joined the Indian Military Academy, Dehradun for a six months emergency commission training course. Pinto was commissioned into the 13th Frontier Force Rifles, one of only four cadets who earned a commission in the infantry among the two hundred or so cadets being commissioned.

=== World War II ===
Second Lieutenant Pinto then proceeded to the 13th Frontier Force Rifles Regimental Centre at Abbottabad and was then posted to the Machine Gun battalion of the regiment at Sultan's Battery. The battalion then boarded a special train to Chaklala, Rawalpindi where they trained for a glider-borne role somewhere in Burma. They then made their way to Kohima via Agartala to join the 7th Indian Infantry Division. They were to be launched into operations as part of then Lt Gen Frank Messervy's IV Corps offensive across the Irrawaddy River.

In Burma, Pinto commanded the Medium Machine Gun (MMG) Platoon of the battalion and participated in different operations against the Imperial Japanese Army and the Indian National Army. Pinto remained in Burma until the fall of Rangoon. After the war, the division was flown out to Thailand, with the task of repatriating the Japanese POWs. After a year in Thailand, Pinto sailed to Madras via Singapore. A special train took them to Taxila from where they took the road to the Regimental Centre in Abbottabad. In 1946, Pinto was appointed Assistant Adjutant of the 13th Frontier Force Rifles Regimental Centre.

=== Post-Independence ===
After the Partition of India, Pinto was earmarked for the 5 Gorkha Rifles (Frontier Force) but was later assigned to the 2nd battalion of the Assam Regiment. Pinto was given command of A Company and sent on foot column protection duty. Later, Pinto's company moved to Shimla to provide ceremonial guard duties for the Governor-General of India, C. Rajagopalachari at the Viceregal Lodge (Rashtrapati Niwas). In 1949, the Brigade of the Guards was being raised from the four oldest battalions of the Indian Army (1 Raj Rif, 1 Rajput, 1 Grenadiers & 2/2 Punjab) by General K. M. Cariappa, the then Commander-in-Chief of the Indian Army. Pinto was selected for the 3rd battalion, Brigade of the Guards (3 Guards) and took over as A Company Commander in January 1950.

In 1951, The battalion moved to the North-East where there were reports of Chinese infiltration across the McMahon Line. Pinto led a Long-range reconnaissance patrol through un-mapped territory to the McMahon Line along the Subansiri River Valley. In May 1954, he was selected to attend the 8th Staff Course at the Defence Services Staff College. On completion, Pinto was posted as brigade major of 191 Independent Infantry Brigade in Jammu and Kashmir. After completing his tenure as Brigade Major, he was posted to the Regimental Centre at Kota. While at the centre, he was selected to attend the 26th Senior Officers' Course, at the Infantry School, Mhow. Later in the year, Pinto was posted as Second-in-Command (Commandant designate) of 4th battalion, Brigade of the Guards (4 Guards). He was promoted to lieutenant colonel and took over 4 Guards in Jammu and Kashmir. After the tenure in J&K, in 1962, he later took the battalion to Fort William, Kolkata which was to be their peace station. But, the Chinese invasion in North-East Frontier Agency had begun and the battalion moved to Sikkim.

After the war, Pinto was posted as directing staff at the Defence Services Staff College. After the tenure at Staff College, he was posted to the Cabinet Secretariat (Military Wing) as staff officer grade 1 (Army). The Military wing comprised the three staff officers of lieutenant colonel or equivalent from the three services.

In 1967, Pinto was promoted to the rank of brigadier and posted as commander, 66 Mountain Brigade in Binnaguri, West Bengal. After a tenure of 2 years, Brig. Pinto was posted back to Defence Services Staff College as the chief instructor (Army). He served at the Staff College for two more years.

As war clouds loomed large, Pinto was promoted to major general and took over as the 3rd general officer commanding 54 Infantry Division at Secunderabad in April 1971.

=== Indo-Pakistani War of 1971 ===
The 54 Infantry Division was a part of I Corps, then the only Strike Corps of the Indian Army. Pinto took the division from its peacetime location in Secunderabad to its operational location in the Punjab within three weeks.

After Pakistan's pre-emptive strikes on 3 December, Pinto's division was to advance between Degh Nadi and Kirar river with a view of capturing line Laisarkalan - Bari - Darman, then Supwal and Barwal, and to be prepared to capture Deoli and Mirzapur. 54 Infantry Division under Pinto, crossed the border as planned at 2000 hrs on 6 December and captured the border outposts at Chamnakhurd, Danadout, Galar Tanda, Chak Jangu, Dhandhar, Mukhwal and Buru Chakby 0230 hrs 7 December.

==== Battle of Basantar ====
The Battle of Basantar was among the most vital battles in the war. It was one of the greatest tank battles fought by the Indian Army. Pinto had the 47 Infantry Brigade, 91 Infantry Brigade and the 74 Infantry Brigade, Poona Horse and one squadron of Hodson's Horse. The date for the Basantar crossing was fixed for night 14/15 December, but was postponed by 24 hours by Pinto. The Battle of Basantar was a decisive Indian victory. When the ceasefire was declared on 17 December, Pinto summed it up:

At 2000 hrs that night, the ceasefire was honoured by both sides and became effective. The guns were silent and an eerie calm pervaded over the bitterly cold night. It was a strange feeling, the sudden peace and quiet after the unending din and noise of the past fourteen days. Most of us were taken aback and felt lost. But, we couldn't waste time on this. We still had our hands full and soon got busy in dominating and securing every inch of the 388 square kilometers, which we had captured and over which the National Flag as well as the Divisional Flag proudly flew.

In what is an Indian Army record, Pinto's 54 Infantry Division won as many as 196 gallantry medals in just 14 days of fierce fighting. These include 2 Param Vir Chakras and 9 Mahavir Chakras.

=== Post-war career ===
After the war, Pinto was awarded the Param Vishisht Seva Medal which he felt was a sore disappointment as the award is generally a non-gallantry peacetime award. The division remained in Pakistan until the Simla Agreement, after which it moved back to Secunderabad in March 1973. Pinto gifted a war trophy - a disabled Pakistani M47 Patton Tank to the Andhra Pradesh Government and had it installed on the Tank Bund Road, Hyderabad.

In 1973, Pinto became the Colonel of the Rajput Regiment. 4 Guards, which he had commanded known earlier as 1 Rajput and was part of the Rajput regimental family. Later that year, Pinto was appointed Director, Military Training (now Army Training Command) where he wore many hats - Chairman - Joint Training Committee, President - Services Sports Control Board, President - Army Mountaineering Federation, President - Army Rifle Association and later was Vice President - Indian Hockey Federation and Vice President - Indian Olympic Association.

After a three-year tenure, Pinto was promoted to lieutenant general and took over as General officer commanding XXXIII Corps in Sukhna. In 1978, he took over as the Commandant of the National Defence College. The National Defence College is the highest seat of strategic learning for Indian Defence and Civil Services officers of the rank of brigadier and Joint secretary to Government of India.

In July 1980, Pinto was appointed Army Commander and took over the Central Command in Lucknow. He was the 8th General Officer Commanding-in-Chief of the Central Command. After a 2-year tenure, Pinto retired on 30 June 1982 after nearly 4 decades in uniform.

== Later life and death ==
After retirement, the Pintos settled down in Pune. Pinto died on 25 March 2021, aged 96.

== Bibliography ==
- Pinto, W.A.G. (2013), Bash on Regardless : A record of a life in war and peace, Natraj Publishers, ISBN 978-8181581983
- Rao, K.V. Krishna (1991), Prepare or perish : a study of national security, Lancer Publ., ISBN 978-8172120016
- Singh, J. J. (2012), A Soldier's General-An Autobiography, HarperCollins, ISBN 978-9350291337

Military offices
Preceded by J. S. Nakai	General Officer Commanding-in-Chief Central Command; 1980 - 1982	Succeeded by H. C. Dutta
Preceded by Air Marshal T. N. Ghadiok	Commandant of the National Defence College; 1979 - 1980	Succeeded by Air Marshal D. G. Kinglee
Preceded by H. C. Rai	General officer commanding XXXIII Corps; 1976 - 1978	Succeeded by Krishnaswamy Sundarji
Preceded by K.A.S. Raja	General Officer Commanding 54 Infantry Division; 1971 - 1974	Succeeded by K. S. Bajwa
