= Austin Miller (British Army officer) =

British army officer (1888–1947)

Major-General Austin Miller CB MC*
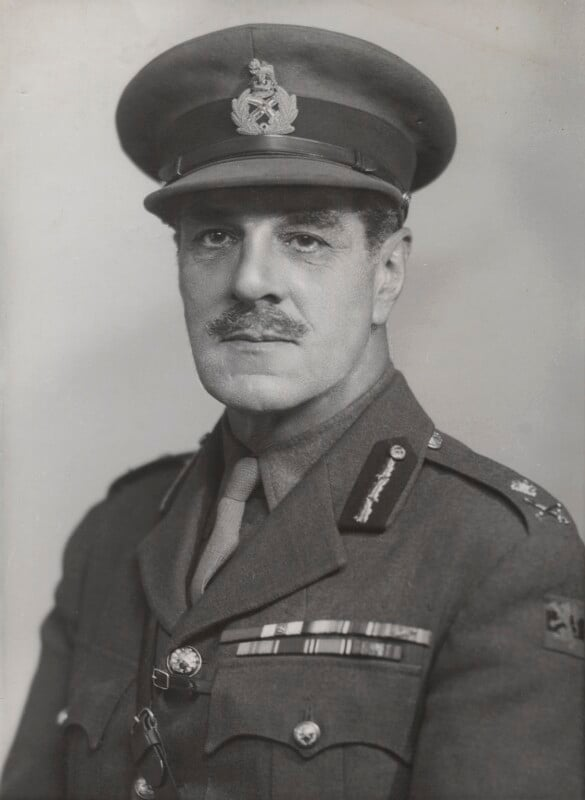
- Miller in 1942
- Born: 28 July 1888; Bedford, Bedfordshire, England
- Died: 16 May 1947 (aged 58)
- Military career
- Allegiance: United Kingdom
- Branch: British Army
- Service years: 1910–1945
- Rank: Major-General
- Commands: 164th (North Lancashire) Brigade (1939–41); 1st Battalion, Sherwood Foresters (1936–37)
- Conflicts: First World War; Second World War
- Awards: Companion of the Order of the Bath; Military Cross & Bar; Mentioned in Despatches (3); Croix de Guerre (France)

Major-General Austin Timaeus Miller, CB, MC & Bar (28 July 1888 – 16 May 1947) was a British Army officer who served in both of the world wars.

== Early life ==
Miller was born in Bedford, Bedfordshire, on 28 July 1888. He was the son of Joseph Miller of Bedford. He was educated at Bedford School and Gonville and Caius College, Cambridge. He entered the British Indian Army on 28 August 1910 as a second lieutenant in the 10th Duke of Cambridge's Own Lancers (Hodson's Horse), and was advanced to lieutenant in December 1911.

== Military career ==
On the outbreak of the First World War in August 1914, Miller was transferred to the Sherwood Foresters (Nottinghamshire and Derbyshire Regiment). He was appointed adjutant and in January 1915 was made a temporary captain. Serving with the 1st Battalion, he arrived in France on 1 March 1915 and soon after was awarded the Military Cross for his bravery and leadership in action. He subsequently served as a brigade major from November 1915 to February 1917 and as General Staff Officer (GSO) Grade 2 from February 1917 to October 1918. For his services he was given the brevet of major in January 1918, was three times mentioned in despatches, awarded a Bar to his Military Cross and awarded the French Croix de Guerre.

Miller subsequently served as an instructor at the Staff School, Cambridge and as GSO 2 in France and with the British Army on the Rhine until June 1919. After attending the Staff College, Camberley, from 1921 to 1922, Miller then held appointments as brigade major in England, with the British Army on the Rhine, and in India. He was promoted brevet lieutenant-colonel in July 1929 and lieutenant-colonel in January 1936. He served as commanding officer of the 1st Battalion, Sherwood Foresters from 1936 to 1937, was promoted to colonel in October 1937, and appointed GSO 1 Northern Command until 31 September 1939.

Promoted to acting brigadier on 1 October 1939 and temporary brigadier in March 1940, Millar was in command of the 164th (North Lancashire) Brigade, Home Forces until April 1941. Miller also served as aide-de-camp to King George VI from February 1940 to November 1941. He was appointed Deputy Adjutant & Quartermaster General of Scottish Command from April to May 1941. Promoted to acting major-general in April 1941 and confirmed in that rank in November 1941, he was in charge of administration of Scottish Command until his retirement in 1945. For his wartime services he was appointed a Companion of the Order of the Bath in 1942.

Miller died on 16 May 1947.

== Bibliography ==
- Smart, Nick (2005). Biographical Dictionary of British Generals of the Second World War. Barnsley: Pen and Sword Books. ISBN 1844150496.
