= 44 Field Regiment (India) =

- Active: 1948 – present
- Allegiance: India
- Branch: Indian Army
- Type: Artillery
- Size: Regiment
- Nickname(s): Fighting Forty Four
- Motto(s): Sarvatra, Izzat-O-Iqbal (Everywhere with Honour and Glory)
- Colors: Red & Navy Blue
- Anniversaries: -

Insignia
- Abbreviation: 44 Fd Regt

44 Field Regiment is part of the Regiment of Artillery of the Indian Army.

== Formation and history ==
The regiment was raised as 44 Anti-Tank Regiment in 1948 with a class composition of South Indian Classes. At raising, the unit was equipped with 6-pounder anti-tank guns. The regiment has since been converted to a heavy mortar regiment, a light regiment, a medium regiment and is presently a field regiment. The unit consists of 69, 70 and 71 field batteries.

== Operations ==
The regiment has taken part in the following operations–

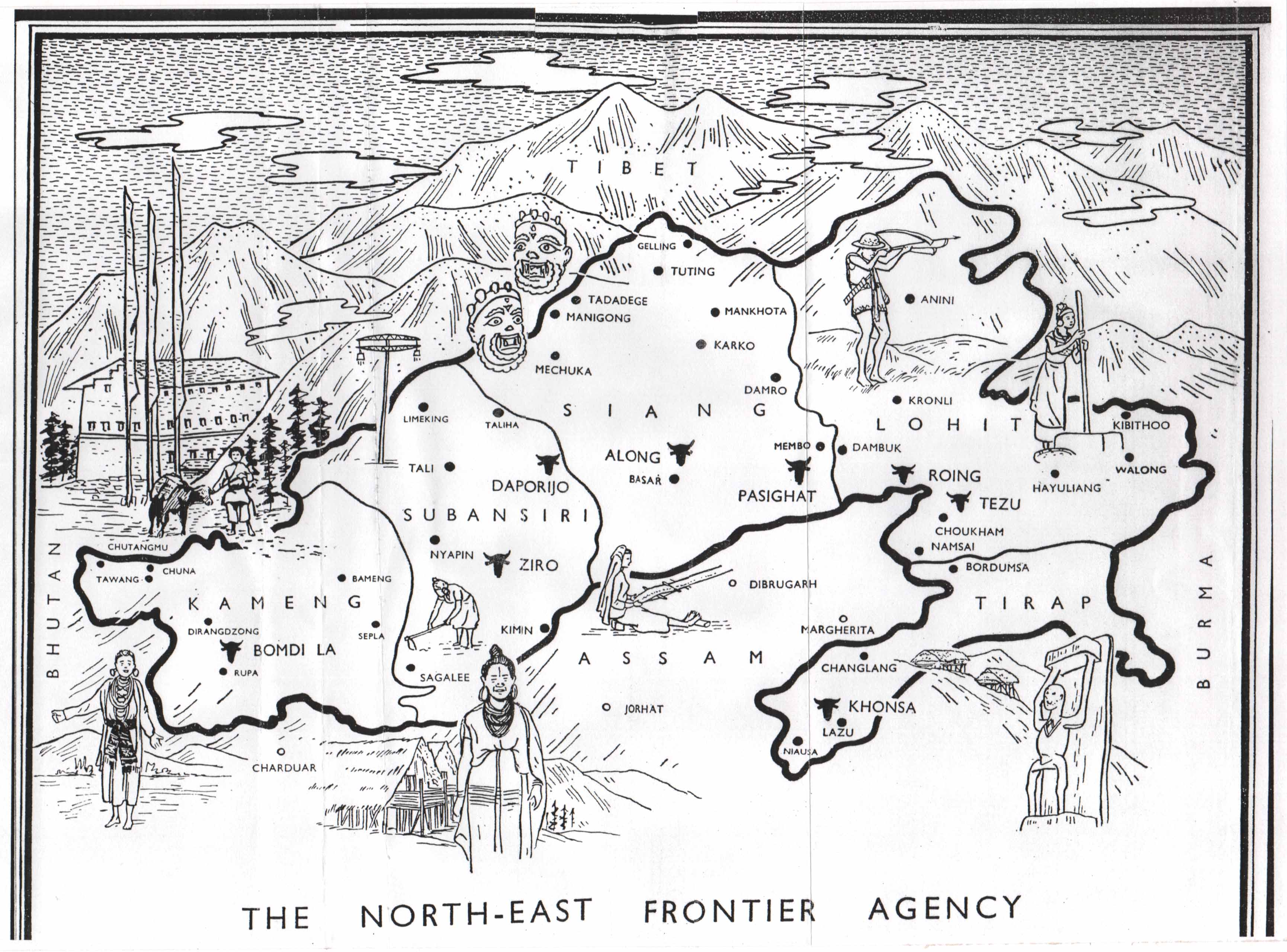
Map of North East Frontier Agency by Verrier Elwin, 1959

- Sino-Indian War of 1962 – The regiment was deployed in North-East Frontier Agency (NEFA), (presently Arunachal Pradesh) during the war. The Lohit, Siang and Subansiri Frontier Divisions of NEFA were the responsibility of 5 Infantry Brigade (which was under 4 Infantry Division of IV Corps, located at Tezpur). 44 Heavy Mortar Regiment was deployed in this large area, with their regiment headquarters at Tezpur in support of 5 Infantry Brigade. 69 Heavy Mortar Battery was deployed in Subansiri frontier division at Daporijo and then in Taliha in support of 2 Jammu and Kashmir Rifles. 70 Heavy Mortar Battery was in Siang frontier division at Tuting and Menchuka in support of 2 Madras. 71 Heavy Mortar Battery was in Lohit Frontier Division at Walong in support of 6 Kumaon and later with 4 Sikh. In spite of firing all their mortars, they were overrun by the vastly superior Chinese numbers, ammunition and equipment. The regiment lost one officer and four men during the operations.
- Indo-Pakistani War of 1965 – 44 Light Regiment took part in Operation Ablaze and Operation Riddle. It lost four men during the operations in the Jammu and Kashmir sector.
- Indo-Pakistani War of 1971 – During Operation Cactus Lily, 44 Light Regiment was part of 54 Artillery Brigade under 54 Infantry Division in the western sector. The regiment lost officer and one Junior commissioned officer during the war.
- Operation Sunflower – 1972
- Operation Blue Star – 1984
- Operation Trident – 1986-1987
- Operation Rakshak – 1995
- Operation Meghdoot – 1995-1997
- Operation Vijay – 1999
- Operation Parakram – 2001-2002
- Operation Falcon and Operation Rhino – 2006-2009 – The regiment was actively involved in counter-terrorism operations in Assam.
- Flood relief operations (2018 Kerala floods) – Columns from the regiment weren't actively involved in rescue efforts during the devastating floods affecting the state of Kerala in 2018.

== Equipment ==
The regiment has used the following weapon systems over the years–

- 1948 – 6-pounder anti-tank guns
- 1956 – 4.2-inch mortar
- 1963 – 120 mm E1 Mortar
- 1972 – Mortar (type ?)
- 1981 – M-46 130 mm guns
- 2006 – 105 mm light field guns

== Gallantry awards ==
The regiment has won the following gallantry awards–

- Vir Chakra
  - Second Lieutenant (later Brigadier) Pradeep Singh Bhandari
- Shaurya Chakra
  - Major (now Brigadier) Sukhmeet Singh, while serving with Assam Rifles
- Sena Medal
  - Colonel Zohair Ibn Salma Yazdani

== See also ==
- List of artillery regiments of Indian Army
