= Anil Chait =

Former general officer of the Indian army

Lieutenant General Anil Chait PVSM, AVSM, VSM
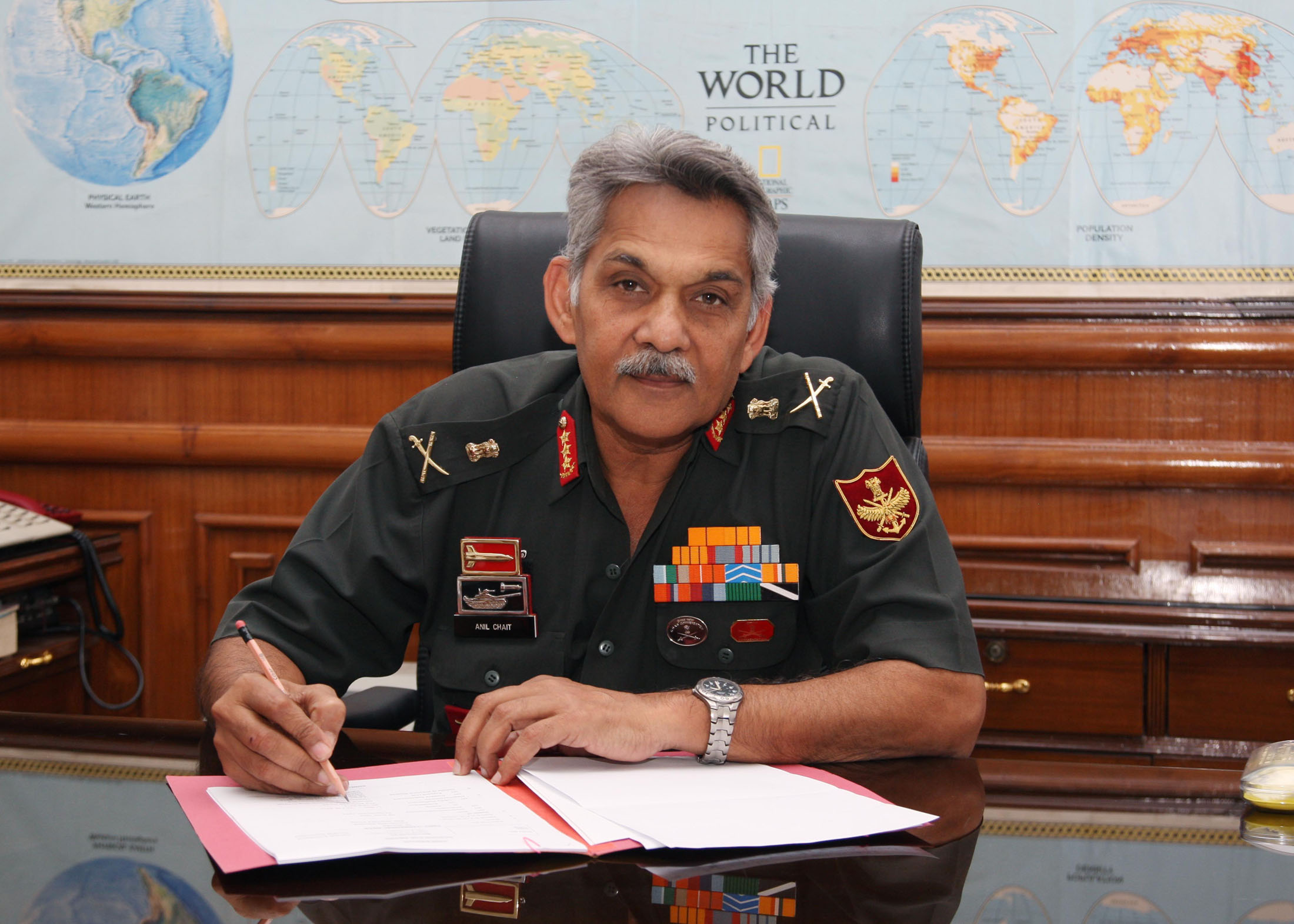
- Military career
- Allegiance: India
- Branch: Indian Army
- Service years: 1973–2014
- Rank: Lieutenant General
- Service number: IC-30016
- Commands: Integrated Defence Staff; Central Command; Army War College, Mhow; II Corps; 54 Infantry Division
- Awards: Param Vishisht Seva Medal; Ati Vishisht Seva Medal; Vishisht Seva Medal

Lieutenant General Anil Chandra Chait, PVSM, AVSM, VSM is a former General Officer of the Indian Army. He last served as the Chief of Integrated Defence Staff, from July 2013 to June 2014. He had also served as the 29th General Officer Commanding-in-Chief Central Command.

== Early life and education ==
Chait attended the Sainik School, Lucknow (later christened Captain Manoj Kumar Pandey U.P. Sainik School, Lucknow). He then attended the National Defence Academy Khadagwasla, Pune and Indian Military Academy, Dehradun.

== Military career ==
=== Early career ===
Chait was commissioned into the Armoured Corps in December 1973. In his early years, he served with the Special Action Group (SAG) of the National Security Guard. He was awarded the Vishisht Seva Medal during this tenure. Chait has attended the Defence Services Staff College (DSSC), Wellington. He later served as a Directing Staff at DSSC as well.

As a colonel, Chait commanded an armoured regiment and served as the colonel general staff (Col GS) of an infantry division on the Line of Control during Operation Parakram. He also served in a staff appointment in the Military Secretary's branch at Army Headquarters, where he was awarded the COAS Commendation Card. Promoted to the rank of brigadier, Chait commanded an independent armoured brigade. He also served in the Perspective Planning Directorate. He also attended the United States Army War College in Carlisle, Pennsylvania, where he was awarded the Medal of Excellence.

=== General officer ===
As a major general, he commanded the 54th Infantry Division in Secunderabad. During this tenure, Chait successfully organised the 2007 Military World Games, for which was awarded the Ati Vishisht Seva Medal in 2008. Chait also served as the ADG (D&V) at Army Headquarters where he was involved in the transformation of Indian Army 2020.

After promotion to the rank of lieutenant general, Chait took command of the Strike Corps - II Corps. He commissioned a study on the restructuring of the Strike Corps, during this tenure. Chait then took over as the Commandant of the Army War College, Mhow. He played an important work in converting the 54th Infantry Division, a formation he earlier commanded, into a Reorganised Amphibious Formation (RAMFOR) in 2011.

He was promoted to army commander grade and took over as the general officer commanding-in-chief Central Command in 2012. He was awarded the Param Vishisht Seva Medal during this tenure. In 2013, Chait spearheaded Operation Ganga Prahar and Operation Surya Hope, the Indian Army's response to the 2013 North India floods. In July 2013, Chait moved to New Delhi as the 9th Chief of Integrated Defence Staff to the Chairman of the Chiefs of Staff Committee (CISC). After serving as the CISC for a year, Chait retired in June 2014.

== See also ==
- Integrated Defence Staff
- Army War College, Mhow

Military offices
Preceded by Lt Gen N C Marwah	Chief of Integrated Defence Staff; 2013 - 2014	Succeeded by Air Mshl P P Reddy
Preceded by Vijay Kumar Ahluwalia	General Officer Commanding-in-Chief Central Command; 2012 - 2013	Succeeded by Rajan Bakhshi
Preceded by S P Rai	General Officer Commanding 54th Infantry Division; 2006 - 2008	Succeeded by Rajesh Singh
