= Sanjay Chauhan (cricketer) =

Indian cricketer and educator

Personal information
- Full name: Sanjay Chauhan
- Born: 12 December 1966 (age 59); Delhi, India
- Batting: Right-handed
- Bowling: Right-arm off break

Domestic team information
- Years: Team
- 1989–1900: Oxford University

Career statistics
Competition	First-class
Matches	6
Runs scored	51
Batting average	8.50
100s/50s	–/–
Top score	25
Balls bowled	96
Wickets	1
Bowling average	59.00
5 wickets in innings	–
10 wickets in match	–
Best bowling	1/58
Catches/stumpings	2/–
- Source: Cricinfo, 3 July 2020

Sanjay Chauhan (born 12 December 1966) is an Indian businessman and former first-class cricketer.

Chauhan was born at Delhi. He later studied at the University of Delhi, where he was at the time one of three people to receive the Mark of Honour, before going up to Worcester College at the University of Oxford as a Rhodes Scholar. While studying at Oxford, he made six appearances in first-class cricket for Oxford University in 1989–90. Chauhan scored 51 runs in his six matches, with a high score of 25, in addition to taking a single wicket from 16 overs bowled.

After graduating from Oxford, Chauhan moved to the United States where he became an accountant. He later served as chief financial officer (CFO) and asset management leader at Urban America, a New Jersey real estate firm, before becoming CFO of Jonathan Rose Companies in June 2015.
