= 162 Medium Regiment (India) =

Indian Army artillery unit

- Active: 1963 – present
- Country: India
- Allegiance: India
- Branch: Indian Army
- Type: Artillery
- Size: Regiment
- Nickname(s): Dograi Destroyers
- Motto(s): Sarvatra, Izzat-O-Iqbal (Everywhere with Honour and Glory)
- Colors: Red & Navy Blue
- Anniversaries: 1 October – Raising Day
- Equipment: M-46 130 mm Field Gun

Insignia
- Abbreviation: 162 Med Regt

162 Medium Regiment is part of the Regiment of Artillery of the Indian Army.

== Formation and history ==
The regiment was raised as 162 Field Regiment on 1 October 1963 under the aegis of School of Artillery, Deolali by amalgamating three ‘S batteries’ from the following units –

- 7 Field Regiment (Gazala)
- 9 (Parachute) Field Regiment
- 61 Field Regiment

The first commanding officer was Lieutenant Colonel GS Bajwa. The regiment was converted to a medium regiment in 2013.

== Equipment ==
The regiment has had the following guns in chronological order -

- 25 Pounder guns – 1963-1986
- 75/24 Pack Howitzer – 1986-1999
- 105 mm Indian Field Gun – 1999-2013
- M-46 130 mm Field Gun – 2013 onwards

== Operations ==
The regiment has taken part in the following operations –

Indo-Pakistani War of 1965

The regiment took part in Operation Riddle and was part of 15 Artillery Brigade under 15 Infantry Division. It was in direct support of an Infantry Brigade, which was tasked in the capture of Dograi in September 1965. The unit fired 21,448 rounds during the Battle of Dograi, the highest in this sector, helping raze the village of Dograi to the ground. It lost two officers (2nd Lieutenants P Arakaiath and DK Dakkar) and ten other ranks during the war.

Nathu La and Cho La clashes

The regiment was deployed in Sikkim during the 1967 clashes with the People's Liberation Army (PLA) of China. Gunner (Operator) S Pakkir Mohammed was awarded the Vir Chakra for gallantry.

Indo-Pakistani War of 1971

The regiment was commanded by Lieutenant Colonel AK Bhandari. The unit was part of 54 Artillery Brigade and was in direct support of 91 Infantry Brigade. It took part in the Battle of Basantar during Operation Cactus Lily and fired 7,482 rounds during this decisive battle. Four officers and two other ranks were mentioned in dispatches. The regiment lost one officer (Captain RS Babu) and two men during the war.

Other operations –

- Operation Sahayta – 2001
- Operation Parakram – 2001-2002
- Operation Falcon and Operation Rhino – 2003-2005
- Operation Fort William – 2004
- Operation Rakshak (counter terrorism operations) – 1992 and 2010-2013

== Gallantry awards ==
- Vir Chakra - Gunner (Operator) S Pakkir Mohammed – who was awarded for gallantry against heavy Chinese fire during the Cho La clashes on 1 October 1967.
- Shaurya Chakra – Major Raju Thundiathu George of the regiment was posthumously awarded for his gallant actions during his tenure with 2nd Battalion, Rashtriya Rifles. He was lost his life on 23 January 1993, during counter terrorist operations in Bijbehara.
- Mentioned in dispatches – Lieutenant Colonel Avtar Kishan Bhandari, Major Manohar Lal, Lance Naik Subramaniam, Gunner Kaithamana Kurian George (all during the 1971 war)
- Chief of Army Staff Commendation cards – 2

== War cry ==
Veeravel Vetrivel (a war cry used in ancient Tamilakam and means Victorious Vel, Courageous Vel. Vel is the holy spear of Murugan, the Hindu war deity).

== See also ==
- List of artillery regiments of Indian Army
