= Sanjay Chauhan (soldier) =

Captain Sanjay Chauhan SC
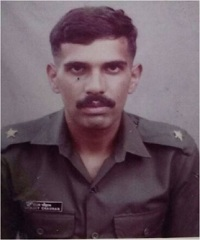
- Died: Lachimpora, Jammu and Kashmir
- Military career
- Allegiance: Republic of India
- Branch: Indian Army
- Rank: Captain
- Unit: 16 Rajputana Rifles
- Conflicts: Kashmir conflict
- Awards: Shaurya Chakra

Captain Sanjay Chauhan, SC, was an Indian Army officer of the 16 Rajputana Rifles who was killed in action in 1994, leading an operation against foreign terrorists in North Kashmir. He was posthumously decorated with the Shaurya Chakra, India's third-highest decoration for conspicuous gallantry in peacetime. He was born in a Rajput family. Capt Chauhan was killed along with his three teammates on 28 October 1994, in the Lacchimpora village of Jammu and Kashmir. At the time, the Kashmir insurgency was at its peak, as pakistani terrorists entered India from the other side of the Line of Control with the objective of destabilizing the state of Jammu and Kashmir.

== Operation Sahas ==
During a military counter-insurgency operation in Jammu and Kashmir, India, Captain Chauhan attempted to infiltrate an enemy militant group. On the basis of actionable intelligence gathered by his network of informers in Kashmir, he planned an assault on foreign terrorists hiding in Lachimpora, Jammu and Kashmir. If successful, the operation could lead to the elimination of foreign militant hierarchy in a sensitive area of Kashmir.Disguised as foreign terrorists, Capt Chauhan and his team of three soldiers, armed with AK-47s, entered the village of Lachimpora. A platoon, led by a JCO, was to hide in a ridge nearby, observing the situation from their vantage point, and respond to any call for help. The militants, despite the soldiers' disguise, grew suspicious. Soon, the team was found out. They escaped the gathering of terrorists and took their place in a hut. The JCO, however, failed to respond to their calls for support even as 20-30 terrorists descended from the hills. The party of soldiers was captured alive and subsequently tortured to death. The horribly mutilated bodies of the soldiers, found in the middle of Handwara, revealed that the militants had tortured them by pulling out their fingernails, gouging their eyes out, chopping their hands off, and by maiming their private parts.

Capt. Sanjay Chauhan was awarded the Shaurya Chakra, India's third-highest military honour, for valour in the face of the enemy.
