= 4th Horse (Hodson's Horse) =

Indian Army regiment

- Active: 1857 – present
- Country: British India; India
- Branch: British Indian Army; Indian Army
- Type: Cavalry
- Size: Regiment
- Nickname: The Flamingoes
- Mottos: तैयार बार तैयार; Tyar Bar Tyar (Always and ever ready)
- Anniversaries: Raising Day, 30 November 1857; Cambrai Day; Basantar Day
- Battle honours: Delhi, 1857; Lucknow; Abyssinia; Afghanistan, 1878-80; Suakin, 1885; Chitral; Punjab Frontier; World War I Givenchy, 1914; Somme, 1916; Bazentin; Flers-Courcelette; Cambrai, 1917; France and Flanders, 1914–18; Megiddo; Sharon; Damascus; Palestine, 1918; Khan Baghdadi; Mesopotamia, 1916–18; Indo-Pakistani War of 1965; Phillora; Punjab 1965; Indo-Pakistani War of 1971; Basantar River; Punjab 1971

Commanders
- Colonel of the Regiment: Lieutenant General Devendra Sharma

Insignia
- Abbreviation: 4 H

4th Horse (Hodson's Horse) is a part of the Armoured Corps of the Indian Army, which had its beginnings as an irregular cavalry regiment during the time of the Indian Rebellion of 1857.

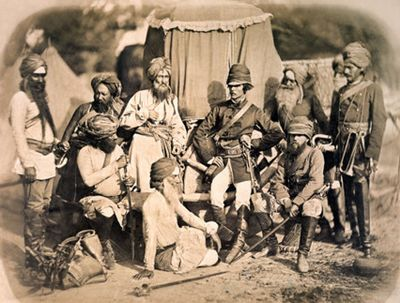
British and Native Officers of Hodson's Horse, 1858 (Photograph by Felix Beato) (Note: This is a photograph about whose subjects there is disagreement in reputable academic circles. (1) www.britishempire.co.uk states the Europeans to be: Lt. Clifford Henry Mecham (standing); Major Henry Dermot Daly (seated); The Sikh officer standing at the far left with long beard is given as Man Sing; the Sikh seated on floor as Jai Singh. (2) National Army Museum, London, names the European officers as: Lt. Clifford Henry Mecham (standing); Asst. Surgeon Thomas Anderson (seated). (3) The Bridgman Art Library gives the European officer seated as Major William Stephen Raikes Hodson; officer standing: Lt. McDowell and seated on the ground is Sikh officer Risalder major Man Singh. The attribution to Hodson is surely incorrect, unfortunately, as there is apparently otherwise only one extant image of this famous officer, the engraving printed as frontispiece to his biography "Rider on a Grey Horse", by B.J. Cork, 1958. There appears to be no disagreement as to the title of the photograph, or its year.)

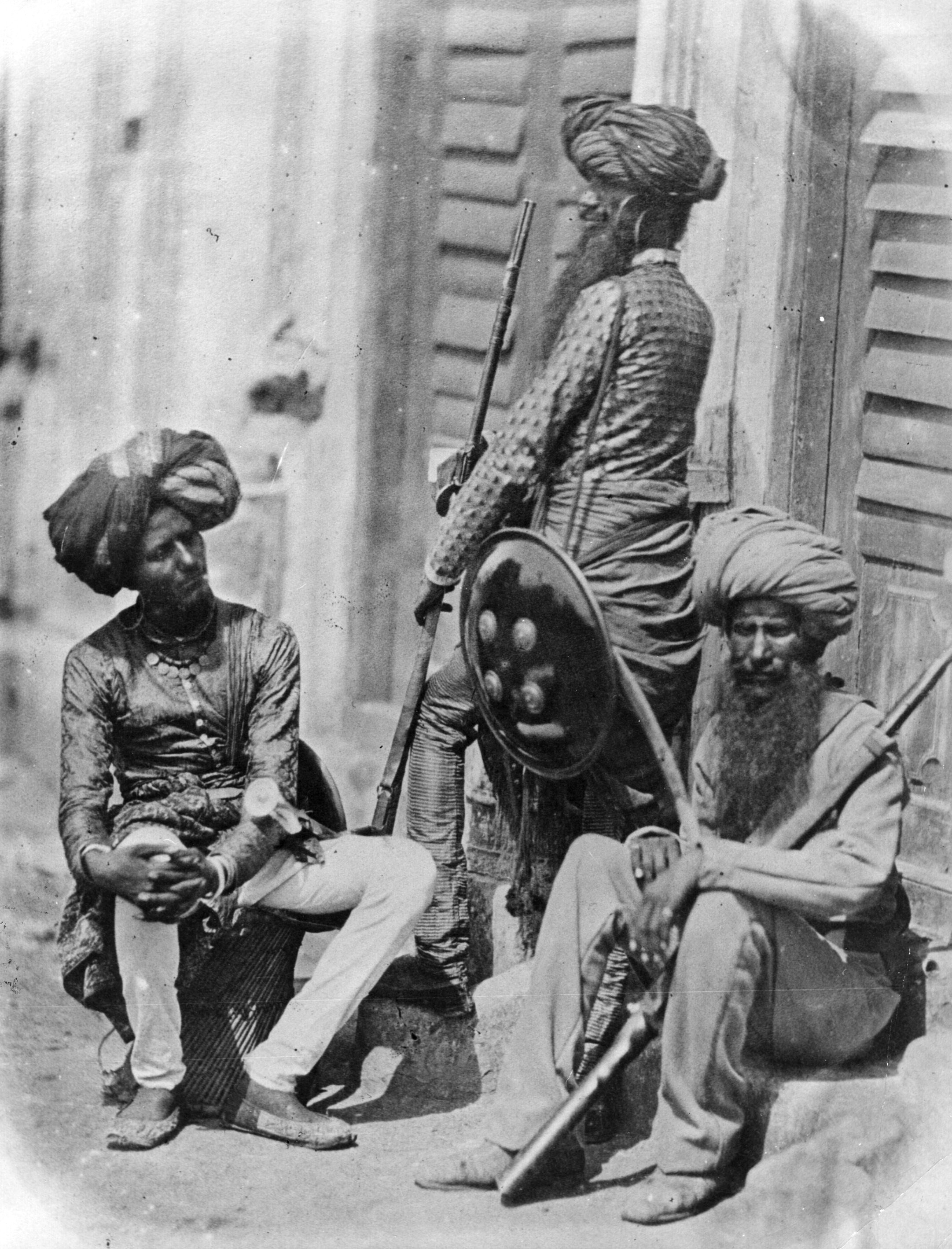
Afghan Sikh Officers of Hodson's Horse during the Indian Rebellion, 1858

== Formation ==
The regiment was raised during the turbulent times of the Indian Rebellion of 1857. During the siege of Delhi, on 19 May 1857, an order was issued by the Commander-in-Chief, Major General George Anson to appoint Lieutenant (later Brevet Major) William Stephen Raikes Hodson as the Commandant of a corps of Irregular Horse, which he was directed to raise, while at Kurnaul.

Hodson sought assistance from Robert Montgomery, Judicial Commissioner of the Punjab. Montgomery asked two Sirdars to raise a rissalah (troop) each, and he raised one himself. The three rissalahs left for Delhi on 23 June 1857 under the command of Man Singh, who was Risaldar-Major of the 1st Regiment from 1866 to 1877. Mr Montgomery sent two more rissalahs on 9 July 1857. The troops were mainly from the Lahore and Amritsar districts of the Punjab.

== History ==
=== Indian Rebellion of 1857 ===
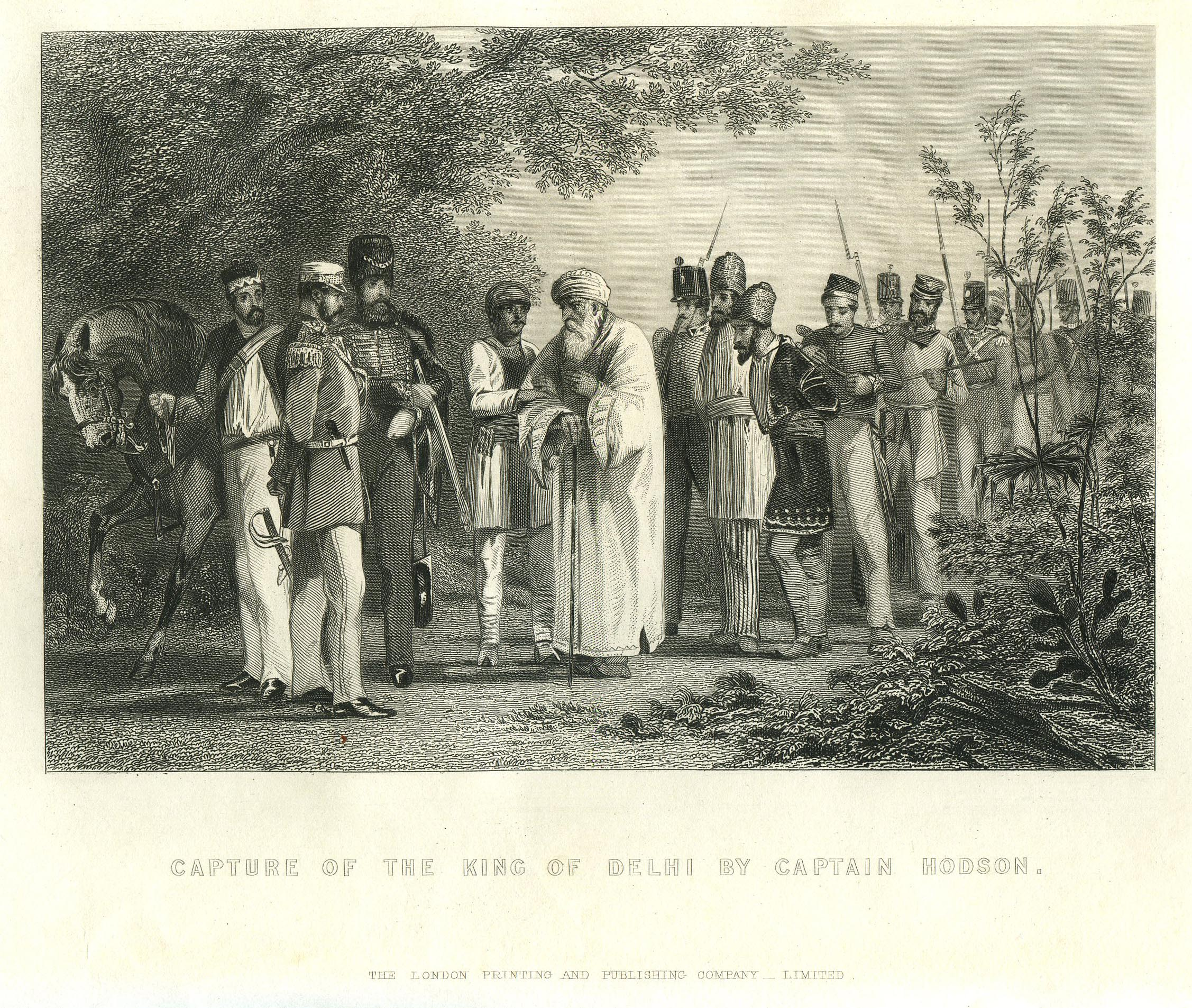
Capture of the Mughal Emperor of Delhi by Captain Hodson (Hand coloured steel engraving from Charles Ball's The History of the Indian Mutiny)

The rissalahs sent to Delhi saw their first action on 14 and 18 July 1857 in the Delhi suburb of Sabzi Mandi. The regiment then fought against the rebels on 17 and 18 August at Khurkowdeh and Rohtak. Following the siege of Delhi, on 20 September 1857, Hodson took 50 men from the regiment, rode to Humayun's Tomb, and captured the Mughal emperor Bahadur Shah Zafar. Hodson returned there the next day and captured the Mughal princes, Bahadur Shah Zafar's sons Mirza Mughal and Mirza Khizr Sultan, and grandson Mirza Abu Bakht. While escorting the princes, Hodson's force was threatened by a large hostile crowd. Rather than let the princes escape, Hodson shot them at the Khooni Darwaza, near the Delhi Gate.

A detachment from Hodson's Horse was sent out on 27 September 1857 to pursue rebels heading for Rohilkhand. The regiment also saw action against the rebels near Agra on 10 October 1857, in Cawnpore, at Alambagh on 12 November 1857, the Siege of Lucknow, against the Gwalior rebels under Tantia Tope, at Gangiri in Aligarh district on 7 December 1857, at the battle at Patiyali, and at Mainpuri. On 25 January 1858, Hodson with 200 of his men and three other British officers were part of a column commanded by Brigadier Adrian Hope against an army of 5,000 rebels encamped at Shamshabad. In the fierce battle, Lieutenant CTM McDowell was killed and Hodson and Lieutenant Charles Gough were badly wounded.

Lieutenant Hugh Henry Gough was awarded the Victoria Cross for his bravery at Alambagh on 12 November 1857 and at Jellalabad, Lucknow on 25 February 1858. A detachment of the regiment was sent with Colonel Hope Grant’s column from Kanpur to protect the road to Lucknow. They laid siege to a town called Mianganj and cleared the enemy, but lost an Indian officer, Naib-Risaldar Hukm Singh. On 25 February 1858, 374 men of Hodson's Horse were part of a cavalry force at Alambagh led by Colonel Campbell of the Queen's Bays. They were under the command of Lieutenant General Sir James Outram against Begum Hazrat Mahal, the Begum of Oudh (Awadh). This was one of the first occasions where the Hodson's Horse saw fierce action as a complete regiment.

While the regiment remained at Alambagh, Hodson went alone to Lucknow for a meeting with Sir Colin Campbell. Following lunch with him, he joined Brigadier-General Robert Napier who was inspecting a breach in the wall. They became separated and he went to look around the palace with a Captain Taylor. The enemy had been cleared from most parts of the city, but areas remained where rebels were hidden. The two men had a look inside one dark room. which turned out to contain rebels. One of them shot Hodson in the chest. He was conscious, but became weaker and died around 1.30 am that night. He was buried on the evening of 12 March 1858 in the grounds of La Martiniere School in Lucknow.

Following Hodson's death, command of the regiment was given to Henry Daly of the Guides Cavalry. Daly played a major role in reorganising the regiment: more troops were recruited, including Pathans, muster rolls were created, and accounts were organised. The regiment was reorganized into three regiments: 1st and 2nd Regiment of Hodson's Horse on 26 August 1858, and 3rd Regiment on 9 September 1858. 3rd Regiment was disbanded on 5 January 1860.

On 13 June 1858, the regiment was involved in a fierce battle at Nawabganj under Hope Grant. The regiment lost 3 men and 24 were wounded.

The regiments of Hodson's Horse were involved in multiple smaller conflicts to suppress the mutiny – in Daudpur on 20 October 1858 against the Nasirabad brigade; at Dholpur on 27 October 1858; at Gonda on 25 November 1858 where they routed a large force led by the Rajah of Gonda; at Basantpur on 23 December 1858; at Jarwa Pass on 31 March 1859 and at Lalpur in May 1859.

== Name changes ==
The two regiments of the Hodson's horse went through various changes in their designation before amalgamating into a single unit.

1st Regiment

- 1857 Hodson's Horse
- 1858 1st Regiment of Hodson's Horse
- 1861 9th Regiment of Bengal Cavalry
- 1886 9th Regiment of Bengal Lancers
- 1901 9th Bengal Lancers (Hodson's Horse)
- 1903 9th Hodson's Horse
- 1921 Amalgamated with the 10th Hodson's Horse to form 9th/10th Hodson's Horse
- 1922 4th Duke of Cambridge's Own Hodson's Horse
- 1927 Hodson's Horse (4th Duke of Cambridge's Own)
- 1947 Post-Partition (To India) - Hodson's Horse
- 1966 4th Horse

2nd Regiment

- 1857 Hodson's Horse
- 1858 2nd Regiment of Hodson's Horse
- 1861 10th Regiment of Bengal Cavalry
- 1864 10th Regiment of Bengal Cavalry (Lancers)
- 1874 10th Regiment of Bengal Lancers
- 1878 10th Bengal (Duke of Cambridge's Own) Lancers
- 1901 10th (Duke of Cambridge's Own) Bengal Lancers (Hodson's Horse)
- 1903 10th Duke of Cambridge's Own Lancers (Hodson's Horse)
- 1921 Amalgamated with the 9th Hodson's Horse to form 9th/10th Hodson's Horse

== Pre World War ==
The 9th Bengal Cavalry was stationed at Faizabad, when on 8 April 1862, they were sent to Bhutan with the three squadrons were sent to different places - one squadron with the headquarters went to Jalpaigori, the second to Barhampur, and the third to Raniganj. The regiment returned to Benares in April 1863. The regiment moved on to Cawnpore on 29 April 1863, then to Peshawar from January 1864 till November 1866. The regiment then spent four years at Mian Mir and in 1868, were part of a punitive expedition to the Black mountains in Hazara, but they saw no action. They spent another four years at Deoli, with a detachment at Jhansi, then moved to Meerut on 8 March 1878.

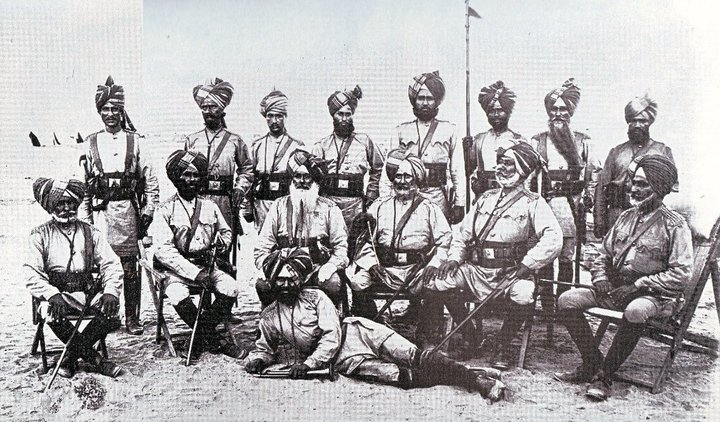
Indian Officers of the 9th Bengal Cavalry - Suakin Field Force, 1885

In 1871, the 10th Regiment of Bengal Cavalry fought in Abyssinia. A squadron of the 10th went to Malta with the 9th regiment in 1878 while the rest of the regiment went to Afghanistan. The 9th travelled from Meerut to Bombay by train in April 1878. They were brought up to strength with a squadron from the 10th Bengal Cavalry, making them around 550 men. From Bombay, they embarked for Malta via Aden and Suez. They disembarked at Malta on 6 June 1878 and pitched camp at San Antonio. The 9th/10th were brigaded with the 1st Bombay Cavalry. Whilst in Malta, the force was inspected by the Duke of Cambridge, who bestowed his title on the 10th Bengal Cavalry, which was represented by one squadron. The eventual destination of the forces stationed in Malta was Cyprus, which had been ceded to Britain by Turkey in exchange for their support against Russia. But a day or so before departure for Cyprus, the regiment was prevented from embarking with the rest of the army, because 48 men were poisoned. Three men died in agony and the rest were permanently disabled. As a result, the regiment stayed in Malta until October, when they sailed back to Bombay.

In February 1885, the 9th was ordered to convert to lancers and move off to join the British Army in Sudan. The regiment moved from Wazirabad to Kanpur, where they received lances and related equipment and reached Suakin in March 1885 under the command of Lieutenant Colonel AP Palmer. It saw action in Hashin, Tofrek, Tamai and T'Hakul. The regiment less one squadron left Sudan in June 1885 for Bombay, from where they travelled to Ambala. The 3rd squadron was required to stay in Suakin until 20 November 1885. The 9th stayed at Ambala until 1888, moved to Nowshera until 1891 – where it was part of the Buner Field Force to ensure the pacification of the Bunerwals. The regiment moved to Peshawar and took part in the durbar and review at Lahore for the Viceroy, Lord Elgin in November 1894. Following this, at Muridki, on the night of 20 December 1894, Daffadar Kartar Singh, bearing a grudge through loss of promotion, shot two officers, Risaldar Kesar Singh and the Commanding Officer, Colonel Ernle Money. He was overpowered, court martialled and publicly hanged on 31 January 1895. Two Sikh officers, who had encouraged the Daffadar were tried in a civil court and sentenced to life.

The 9th were part of the Chitral Relief Force in April 1895 and received the battle honour 'Chitral'. They moved to Rawalpindi in May 1895. Following the re-organisation of 1895, the regiment retained their name and came under Punjab Command. On 10 August 1897, the regiment was ordered to proceed by train from Rawalpindi to Peshawar and became part of the ‘Peshawar column’ of the Tirah Expeditionary Force. Many men and a large number of horses were sent for remount duties to South Africa and many British officers for active service for the Second Boer War. Hodson's Horse was the first Indian regiment to appear and win medals at the Royal Tournament in 1902. The 9th regiment took part in the Rawalpindi Parade on 8 December 1905 to honour the Prince and Princess of Wales.

== World War I ==
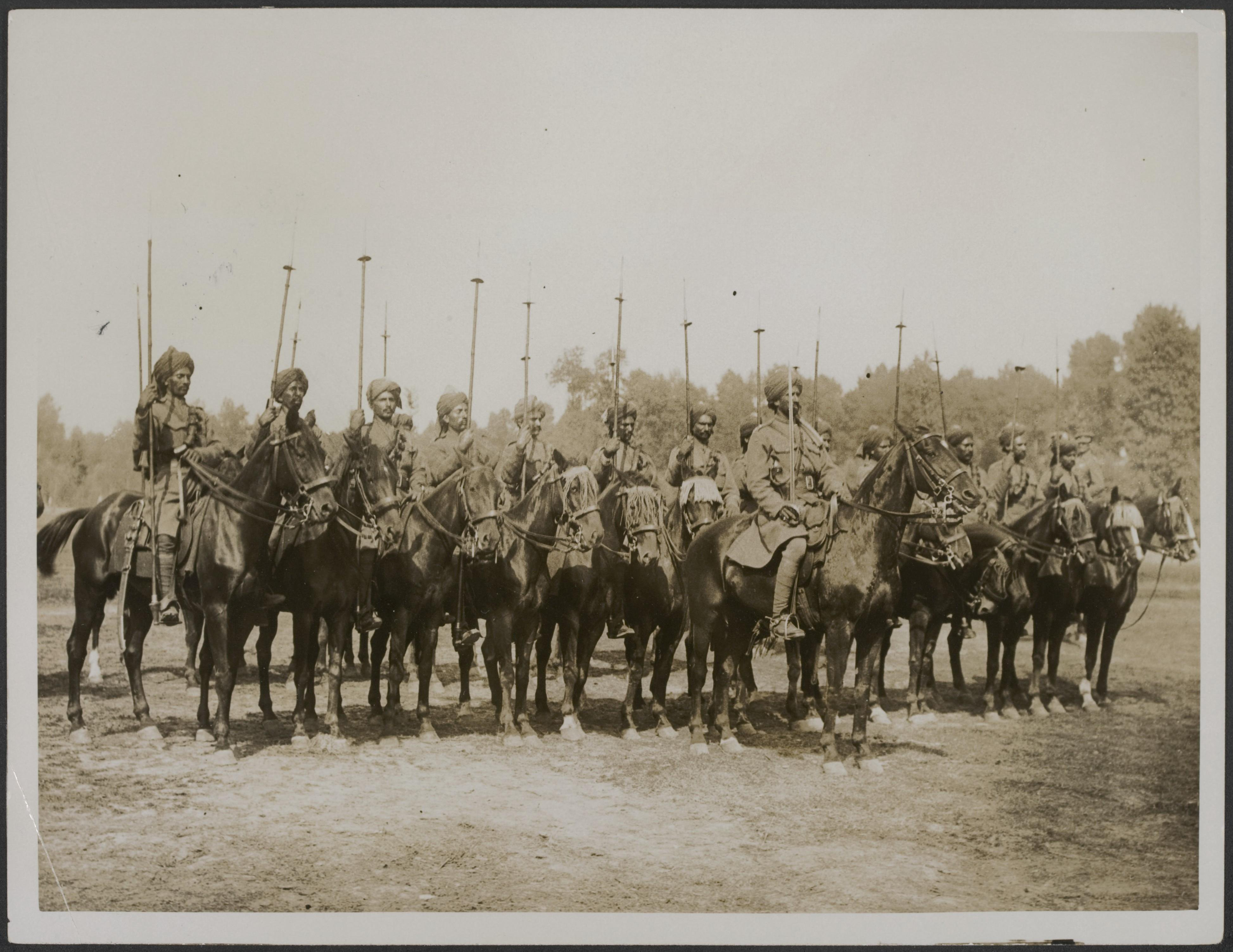
A troop of Hodson's Horse during the First World War

On 31 August 1914, 9th Hodson's Horse, located at Ambala, got the orders to prepare to move as part of the 3rd (Ambala) Cavalry Brigade for war in France. Its convoy reached Marseille on 7 November, moved to Orléans, where it was trained with British soldiers for trench warfare for 10 days. It became part of the 1st Indian Cavalry Division (till it joined the 2nd Indian Cavalry Division on 15 September 1915). On 21 December, Hodson's Horse was inducted to La Bassée, where it fought in the trenches full of water and dirt. Thereafter, it moved near Norrent-Fontes for training with the division followed by another phase of trench battle in very adverse weather for which it was awarded the battle honour "Givenchy". In June 1916, it fought protracted actions earning more battle honours – Somme, Bazentin and Flers – Courcelette.

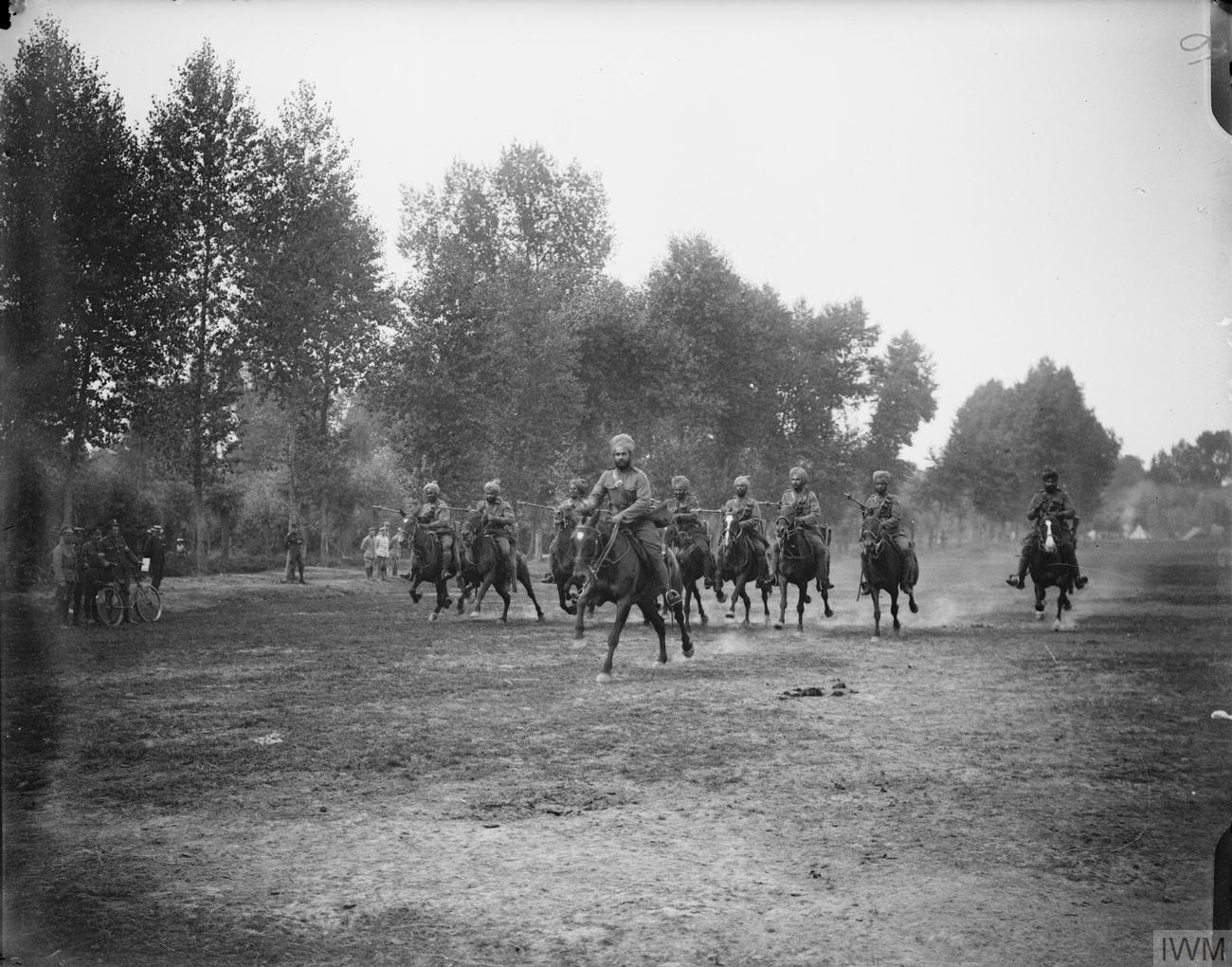
Men of the 9th Hodson's Horse, practising a charge with the lance near Querrieu, September 1916.

It was in Cambrai towards the end of November and early December, 1917, that the Regiment fought its toughest action. It came under heavy fire with the forward most troops facing the brunt of it. The heavy toll of fatal casualties included two brave officers, Majors A.I. Fraser and F.S.T. Atkinson. It was in this battle that the Regimental Medical Officer, Captain Som Dutt, MC, treated an enemy German officer, who was so overcome that he took off his Iron Cross and presented it to him. The battle honour Cambrai awarded to the Regiment, became an important one celebrated every year on 30 November. The regiment was also awarded the theatre honour France and Flanders.

In March 1918, the 2nd Indian Cavalry Division was broken up in France. The Canadian and British units remained in France and the Indian elements were sent to Egypt. The regiment briefly served as part of the 5th Mounted Brigade, Australian Mounted Division before it became part of the 13th Cavalry Brigade of the 5th Cavalry Division, where they saw service in General Edmund Allenby's final campaign against the Turks and Germans. They marched from Nazareth to Damascus, where Risaldar Nur Ahmed of Hodson's Horse made hundreds of Turks surrender to him. On 18 September the Division moved to El Jelil and next day early morning attacked the front line and right flank and captured lt. Thus, Infantry got its safe lane for further advance. At 0600 hours, 9th Hodson's Horse reached Nahr El Falik. ‘C’ and ‘D’ Squadrons of the Regiment captured 70 prisoners, guns and other war material while crossing Nahr El Falik and Murkhalid.

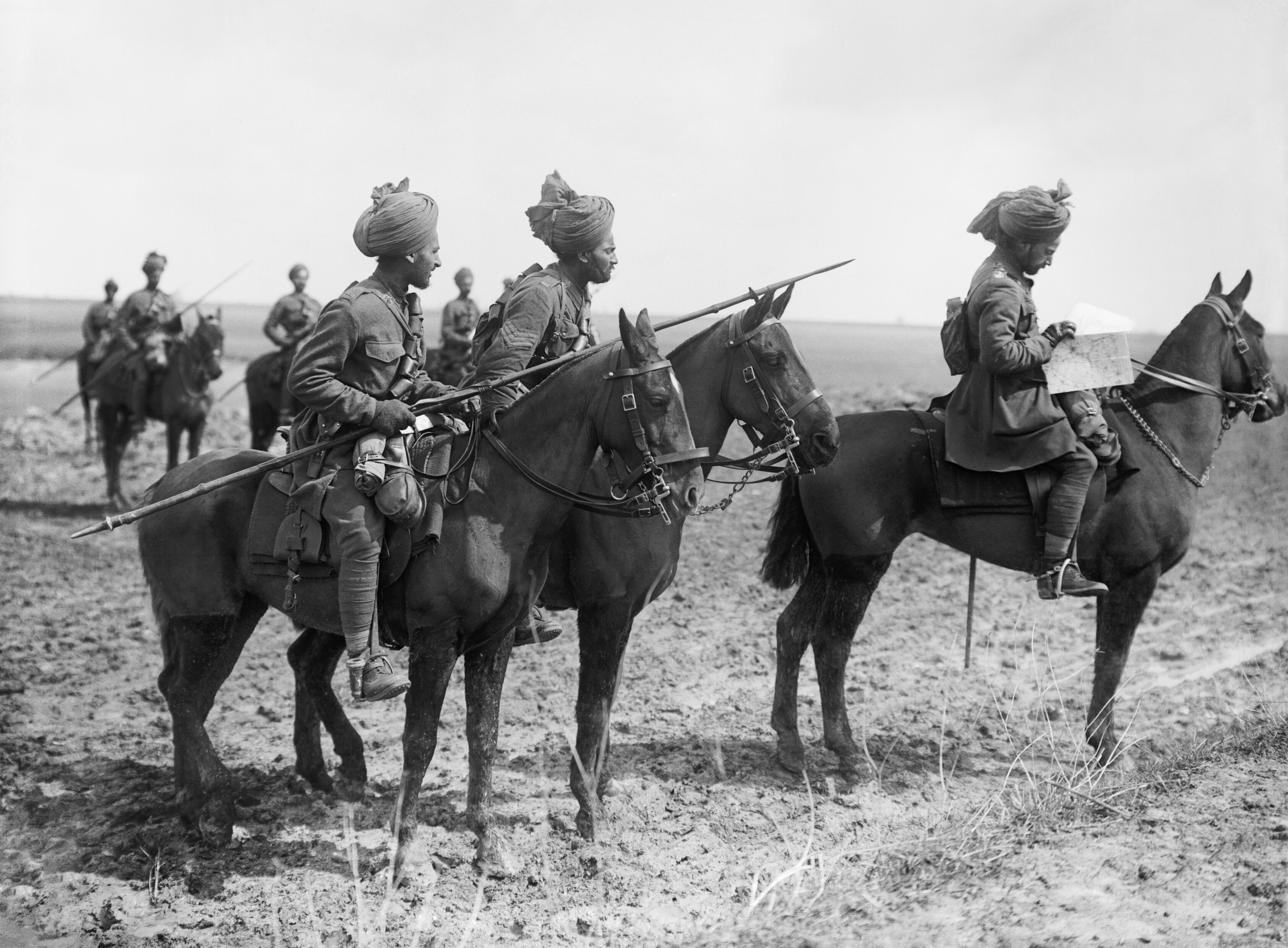
Forward scouts of the 9th Hodson's Horse, pause to consult a map, near Vraignes, France, April 1917

On 30 September, in an action where 9th Hodson's Horse was leading, Major MD Vigors commanding ‘D’ Squadron got an input of 70 Turkish soldiers advancing to Kiswe. In a number of more actions that ensued, not only those 70 but a total of 900 Turkish soldiers with a lot of arms and equipment were captured. Turkish Army had lost most of its soldiers, but Gen Allenby decided to finish the rest of the Turkish Army. Around Aleppo, there were about 20,000 Germans and Turkish soldiers, of which 8000 had already lost hope. On 20 March the Division advanced towards Aleppo. On 26 October, 9 Hodson's Horse was inducted into Aleppo and by 31 October the Turkish Army surrendered. In these 38 days, the Regiment covered a total of 567 miles and made a major contribution to the Division's tally of 1100 prisoners of war and 58 canons. The battle honours awarded to 9th Hodson's Horse in the Middle Eastern theatre were Megiddo, Palestine, Sharon, Damascus, Khan-Baghdadi and Mesopotamia. The regiment continued to stay in the Middle East after the war and returned to India in December 1920. The regiment's overseas tenure of five years was the longest for a cavalry regiment in the British Indian Army.

The 10th Duke of Cambridge's Own Lancers (Hodson's Horse) was stationed at Loralai in Balochistan under the 4th (Quetta) Division, when the First World War broke out in August 1914. It had arrived from Jullundur on 18 November 1912 and had detachments at Gumbaz, Maratangi, Murgha and Musa Khel. While the regiment did not proceed overseas until 1916, the Regiment supplied drafts of officers and men to other cavalry regiments. Over 350 officers and men of the Regiment were sent abroad, before the 10th Lancers received orders to mobilize for service in Mesopotamia in August 1916, the first two squadrons arriving in September and the other two squadrons and headquarters in October 1916. The 10th Lancers initially served as part of the Tigris Defences, guarding the lines of communication between Amara and Sheikh Sa’ad. From 1 January to 3 March 1917 a squadron of the regiment formed part of III (Tigris) Corps Cavalry Regiment in the advance to Capture Baghdad. The Regiment spent the next three years serving in Mesopotamia, but it would be during the Iraqi revolt of 1920, that the 10th Lancers suffered its heaviest casualties. On 3 September 1920, an armoured train at Samawa which was guarded by ‘D’ Squadron was overwhelmed and the 10th Lancers lost 28 men. The Regiment left Mesopotamia on 30 October 1920 and returned to India.

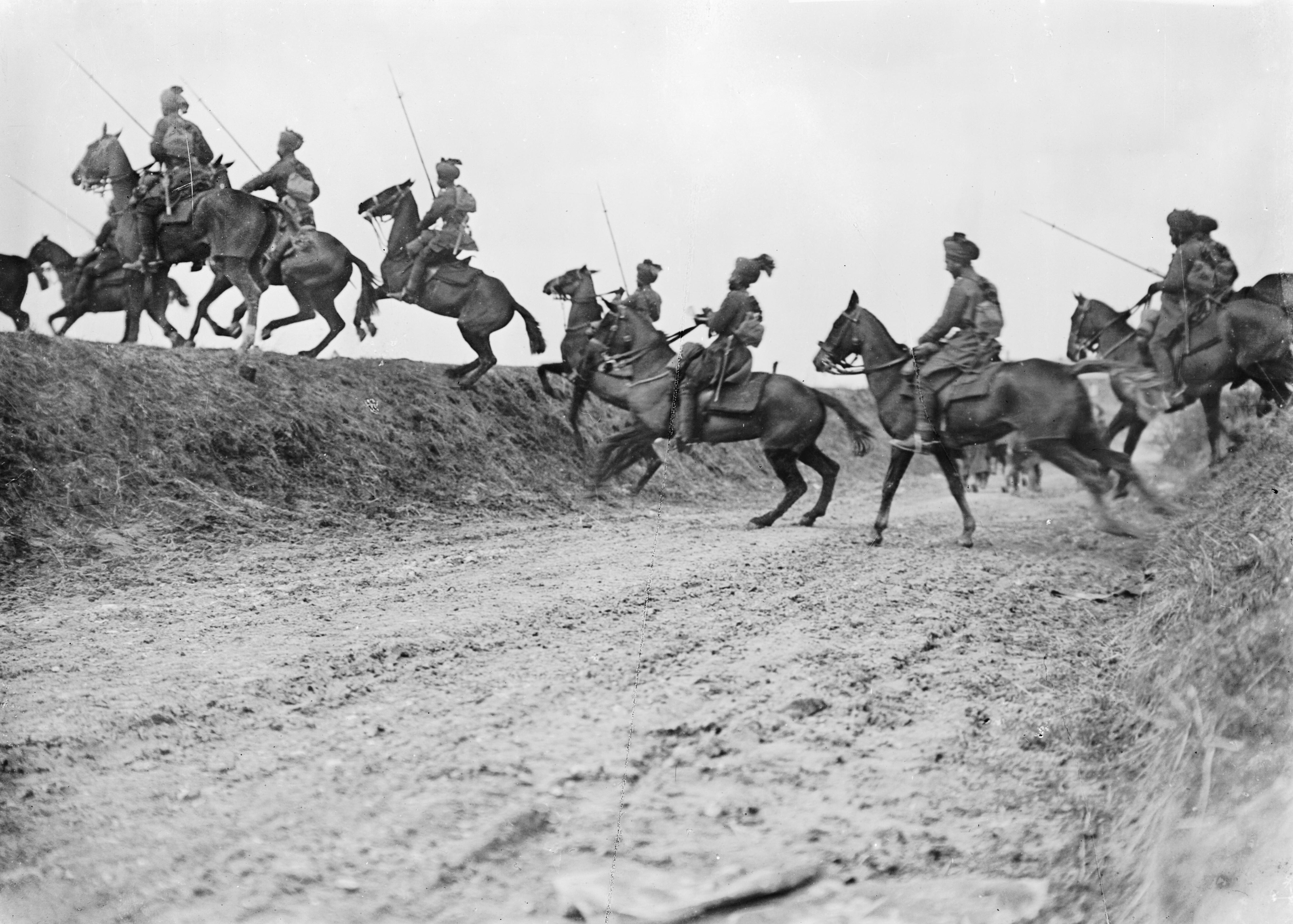
9th Hodson's Horse (Bengal Lancers), near Vraignes, April 1917

The two regiments won the following gallantry awards during the Great War –

- Distinguished Service Order : Major Arthur Ion Fraser
- Military Cross : Jemadar Hasan Shah, Risaldar Nur Ahmad Khan (9th Hodson Horse), Ressaidar Laurasib Khan (10th Duke of Cambridge's Own Lancers (Hodson's Horse))
- Order of British India : Risaldar Major Malik Khan, Risaldar Muhammad Akram Khan, Risaldar Jai Ram, Risaldar Ram Singh (9th Hodson Horse), Risaldar Ajab Khan (9th Hodson Horse), Risaldar Nur Khan (10th Duke of Cambridge's Own Lancers (Hodson's Horse))
- Indian Order of Merit : Sowar Abdullah Khan, Dafadar Hakim Singh, Ressaidar Nur Ahmad Khan, Ressaidar Nur Ahmad Khan, IOM, Lance Daffadar Muhammad Azam, Jemadar Sardar Khan, Risaldar Dost Muhammed, Jemadar Nawab Ali Khan (9th Hodson Horse), Sowar Hayat Muhammad, Dafadar Sarfaraz Khan, Sowar Mansa Ram (10th Duke of Cambridge's Own Lancers (Hodson's Horse))
- Indian Distinguished Service Medal : 9th Hodson Horse – 25 medals, 10th Duke of Cambridge's Own Lancers (Hodson's Horse) – 13 medals.
- Indian Meritorious Service Medal : 9th Hodson Horse – 38 medals, 10th Duke of Cambridge's Own Lancers (Hodson's Horse) – 12 medals.
- Croix de guerre (Belgium) : Dafadar Nawab Ali Khan, Lance Dafadar Sorain Singh (9th Hodson Horse)
- Order of the Nile, 4th Class : Ressaidar Hasan Singh (9th Hodson Horse)

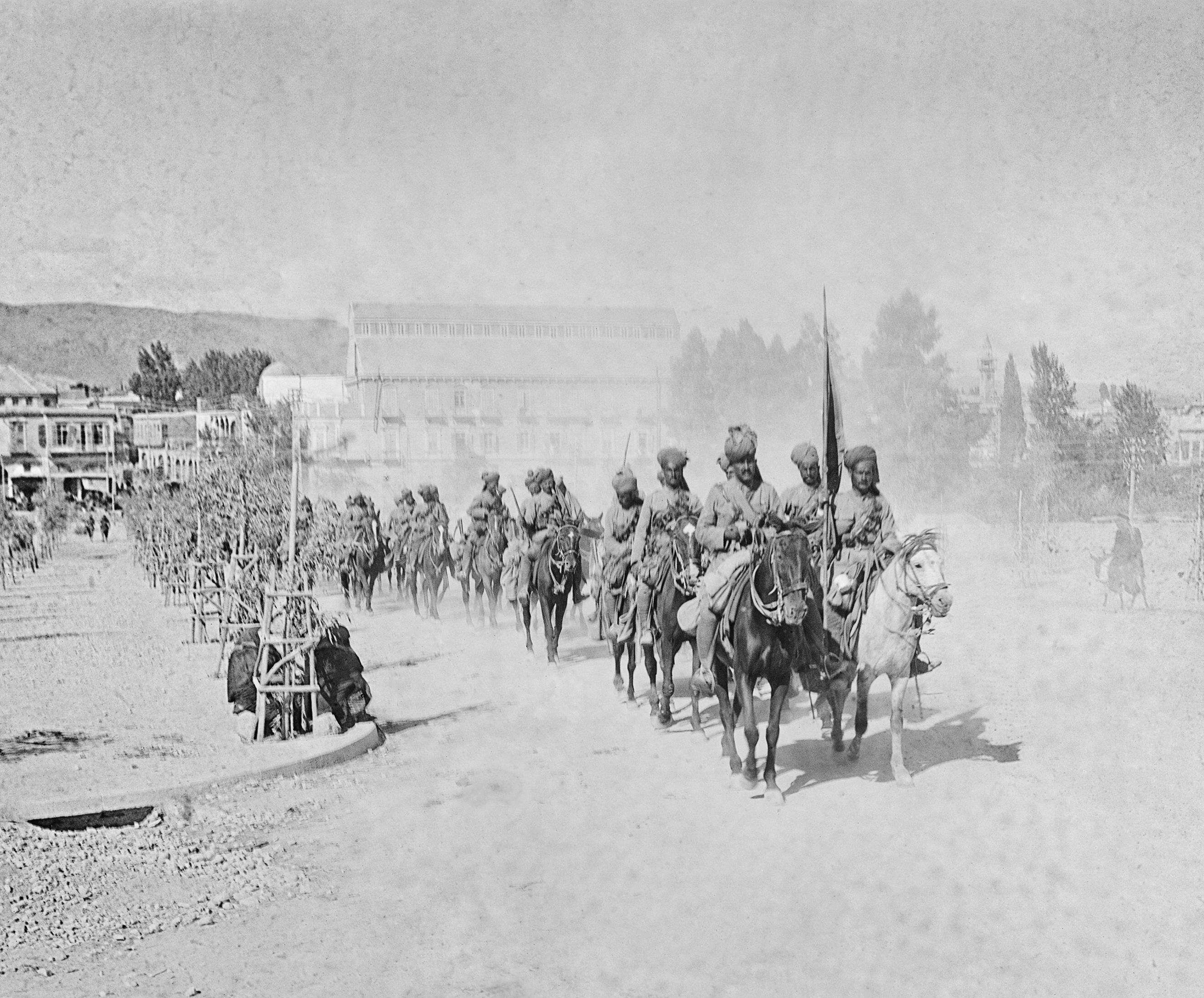
9th Hodson's Horse in Damascus, 2 October 1918

== World War II ==
In 1921, the British decided to cut down on the number of cavalry regiments, and re-amalgamated the two as the 10th Duke of Cambridge's Own Lancers (Hodson's Horse). At the time of the war, the regiment was part of the 2nd Indian Armoured Brigade, which was later designated as the 252nd Indian Armoured Brigade. The brigade was under 31st Indian Armoured Division and served in the Middle East in Iraq and Palestine. It received the M3 Stuart light tanks in November 1942. Major General FW Messervy of the regiment was awarded a Companion of the Order of the Bath, a Distinguished Service Order and a mention, while Major MR Smeeton was awarded a Military Cross.

== Indo-Pakistani War of 1965 ==
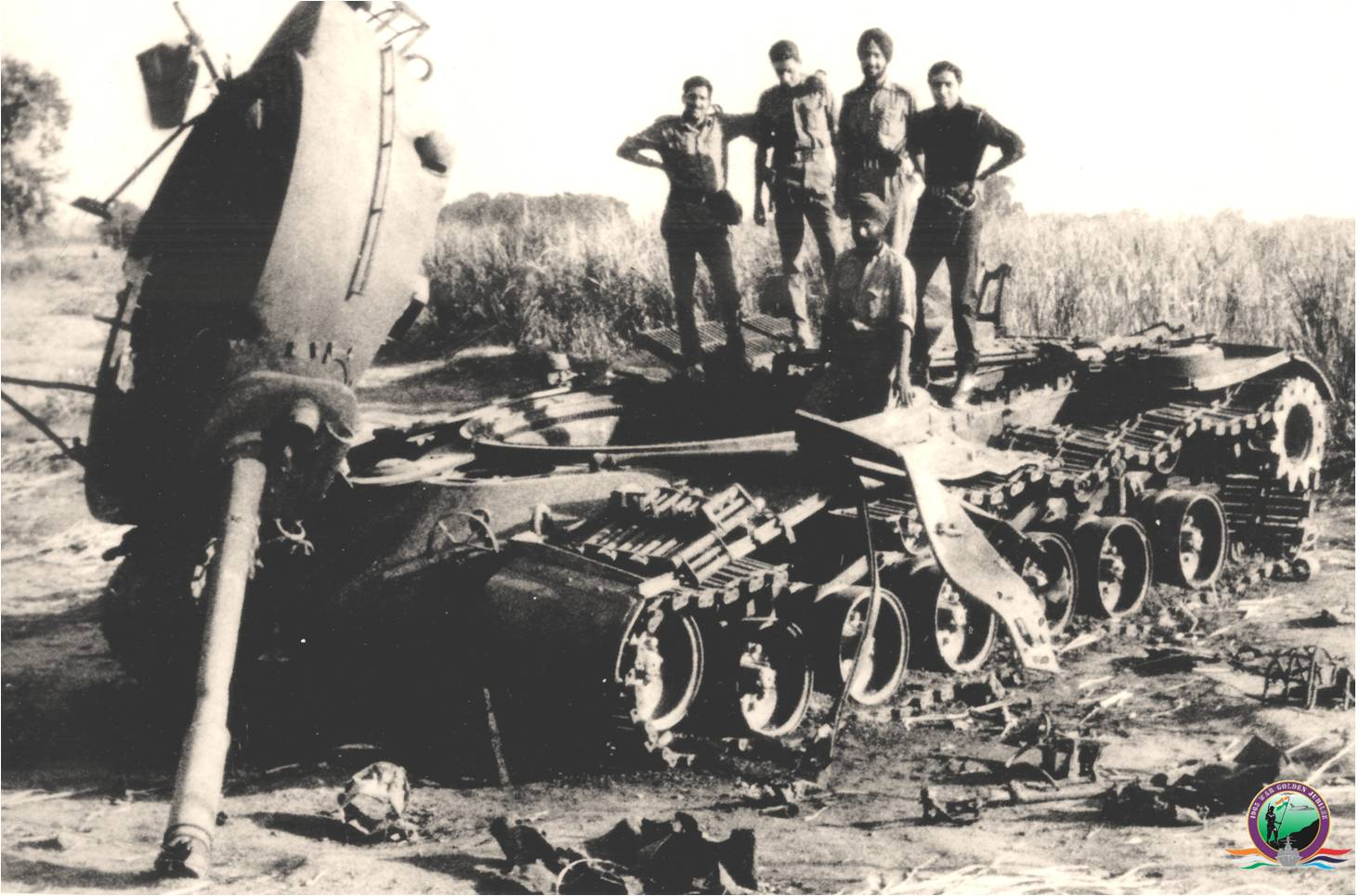
Officers and Jawans of 4 Horse standing on a destroyed Pakistani tank during the 1965 Indo-Pak War

In the 1965 war, Hodson's Horse was equipped with the Centurion tanks. It was part of the divisional reserve of the 1st Armoured Division, tasked for the massive attack at the Phillora sector against the Pakistani 6th Armoured Division. From Rurki Kalan, two regiments (4 Horse and 17 Horse) were to open out and encircle Phillora by a pincer movement from both flanks, while 16th Light Cavalry was to provide flank protection from the right. 43rd Lorried Brigade was tasked to capture Phillora. This armada of tanks destroyed the maximum number of enemy tanks (most of which were newly acquired and technologically superior Patton tanks) and recoilless guns.

The Commandant, Lieutenant Colonel (later Brigadier) MMS Bakshi's tank got detached from the main body of the regiment owing to moving through the tall sugarcane crops. Reaching a stretch of open ground, he spotted four Pakistan's army Patton tanks. Immediately, he gave out fire orders for engaging them. Three of the Pattons were hit by his gunner one after another and it was only then that the fourth Patton had homed on to his tank. Both tanks fired simultaneously at each other and both were hit. With his tank catching fire, he ordered the crew to bail out. With him apart from the gunner and driver of the tank was his regimental signal cum intelligence officer, Lieutenant (later Brigadier) Ravi Malhotra, who was performing the duties of the radio operator-cum–loader. Having bailed out, they came under small arms fire from the Pakistani crew of the four destroyed Pattons, who had all bailed out too. Bakshi then fired back at them with his revolver and ordered his crew to get into the sugarcane crop, through which they moved on foot and after some time they were fortunate to be picked up by a squadron of the Poona Horse and eventually joined up with their own regiment.

The regiment won the following gallantry awards –

- Maha Vir Chakra : Lieutenant Colonel MMS Bakshi, Major Bhupinder Singh
- Vir Chakra - Lance Dafadar Udham Singh
- Sena Medal : Captain Arun Kumar Nehra, Dafadar Didar Singh, A/Lance Dafadar Onkar Datt, Naib Risaldar Piara Singh, Sowar Harbhajan Singh
- Mentioned in despatches - 11.
- The Regiment was bestowed with the battle honour ‘Phillora’ and the theatre honour ‘Punjab 1965’.

== Indo-Pakistani War of 1971 ==
In the 1971 war, the regiment, equipped with Centurion tanks was part of the 54th Infantry Division, commanded by Lieutenant Colonel (later Lieutenant General) Raj Mohan Vohra in the Shakargarh sector of the western front. His regiment spearheaded the advance capturing in its wake several Pakistan Army positions in villages namely Bhairo Nath, Thakurdwara, Bari Lagwal, Chamrola, Darman, Chakra and Dehlra and took in the famous Battle of Basantar.

The regiment won the following gallantry awards –

- Maha Vir Chakra : Lieutenant Colonel RM Vohra
- Vir Chakra : Major Kamal Nanda, Major Suraj Jit Chaudhari, Major Govind Singh
- 8 mentioned in despatches
- The regiment was awarded the Battle Honour ‘Basantar River’ and Theatre Honour ‘Punjab 1971’.

== Other achievements ==
- The regiment was awarded with the 'Guidon' on 4 March 1976, at Pathankot, Punjab.
- Dafadar Harbhajan Singh was awarded the Shaurya Chakra posthumously in 2006 for his act of gallantry in Jammu and Kashmir, while serving with 8 Rashtriya Rifles.
- The regiment has produced sportsmen of international repute like Pardumman Singh and Karnail Singh, who have represented India in the Olympics, Asian and Commonwealth Games.

== Regimental insignia ==
The regimental badge consists of crossed lances with pennants; the Lions of Ashoka above the cross-over point and a scroll across the bottom with embossed inscription: HODSON'S HORSE. Prior to independence, the badge had a crown instead of the lion capital. The shoulder title is ‘4H’ in brass.

== Regimental Composition ==
4 Horse celebrating the 56th anniversary of Battle of Phillora, 21 September 2021.
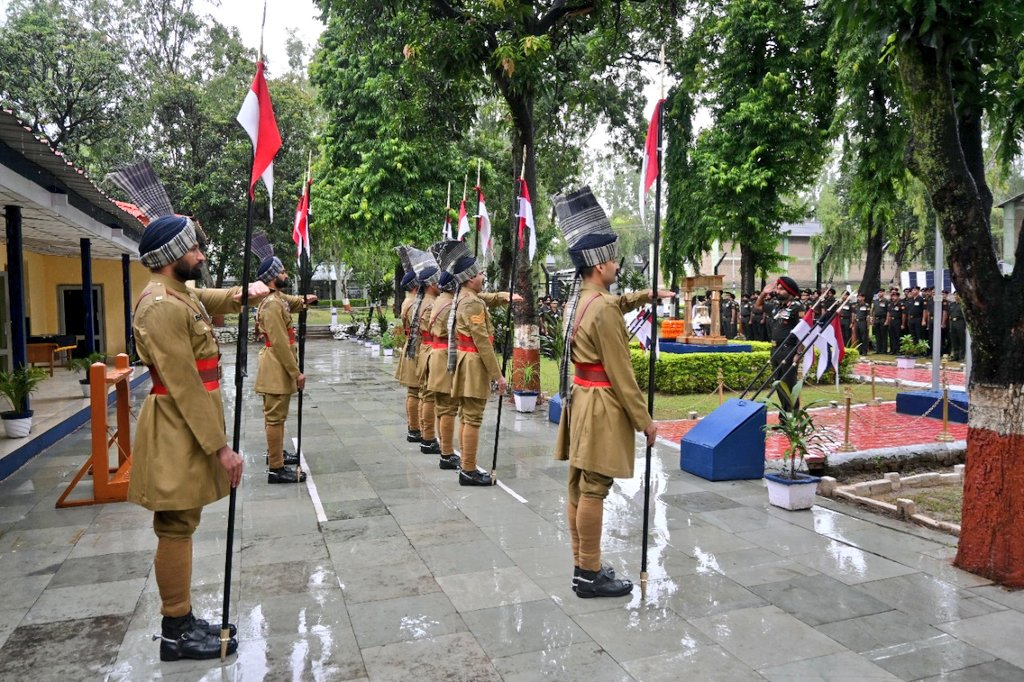
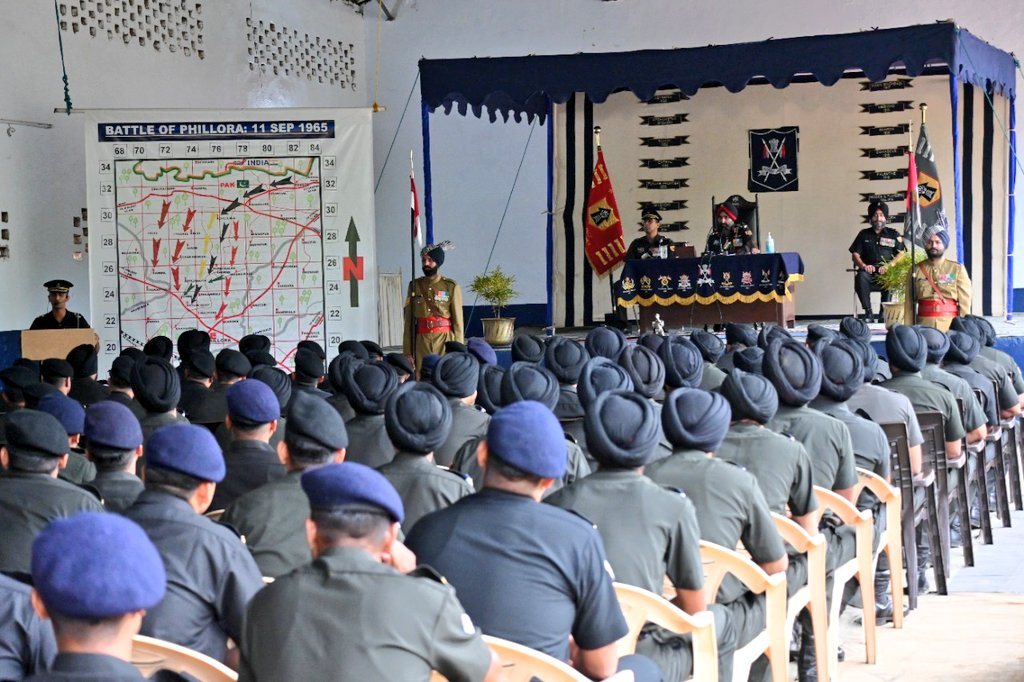
- In the time immediately after the mutiny, the 1st Regiment consisted of one squadron of Sikhs, one squadron of Punjabi Musalmans, one troop of Pathans and border tribesmen, and one troop of Dogras.
- In 1886, the class constitution was changed a little and an extra squadron was added, making 4 squadrons consisting of two troops each as follows: Sikhs – 3 troops, Dogras – 1 troop, Punjabi Muslims – 1 troop, Punjabi Musalmans – 2 troops, Pathans – 1 troop and Hazaras – 1 troop.
- Prior to amalgamation, the 9th Horse had a composition of 1 ¼ squadron of Sikhs, 1 ¼ squadron of Dogras, 1 ¼ squadron of Punjabi Musalmans and ½ squadron of Pathans; whereas the 10th Horse had 1 ¼ squadron of Sikhs, 1 squadron of Dogras, 1 squadron of Punjabi Musalmans and ½ squadron of Pathans.
- At present, the regiment is composed of two Sikh and one Dogra Squadrons.

== Notable officers ==
- Major William Stephen Raikes Hodson - Commanding officer on formation.
- General Sir Hugh Henry Gough VC, GCB – Was a Lieutenant in the Bengal European Light Cavalry, and serving in the Guides Cavalry - received the Victoria Cross for his acts of bravery during the mutiny, while serving in the Hodson's Horse.
- General Sir Charles John Stanley Gough, VC, GCB – Brother of Hugh Gough, joined the 8th Bengal Cavalry, and served in the Guides Cavalry - received the Victoria Cross for his acts of bravery during the mutiny, while serving in the Hodson's Horse.
- General Sir Henry Dermot Daly GCB, CIE – Second Commandant of the Regiment
- Risaldar-Major Man Singh - Raised the first troop (risallah), decorated with the Order of Merit 1st class and the Order of British India 1st class. On 9 March 1866, he was appointed as the first Risaldar Major of the 9th Bengal Cavalry, a post he held until his retirement in 1877. Having left military service, he was made Honorary Magistrate at Amritsar and then manager of the Golden Temple at Amritsar.
- Colonel Osmond Barnes CB - Commanded the 10th Bengal (Duke of Cambridge's Own) Lancers and was Herald, who proclaimed Queen Victoria as the Empress of India at the Great Imperial Assemblage on 1 January 1877.
- General Sir Arthur Power Palmer, GCB, GCIE - Commander-in-Chief, India between March 1900 and December 1902.
- Major General Sir Charles Metcalfe MacGregor KCB, CSI, CIE - Quartermaster General for the British Army in India, the head of the Intelligence Department for the British Indian Army and founder of the United Service Institution of India.
- Major General Sir Guy Archibald Hastings Beatty KBE, CB, CSI, CMG, DSO & Bar - Was Aide de Camp to King George V, commander of the 4th Indian Cavalry Brigade in August 1925 and Military Adviser-in-Chief, Indian State Forces.
- Major-General Austin Timeous Miller CB, MC & Bar
- Lieutenant General Thomas William Corbett, CB, MC & Bar - General Officer Commanding (GOC) of the 1st Indian Armoured Division and commanded the IV Corps during the Second World War.
- General Sir Frank Walter Messervy, KCSI, KBE, CB, DSO & Bar - General Officer Commanding-in-Chief Northern Command, India in 1946 and 1947 and the first Commander-in-Chief of the Pakistan Army.
- Colonel George Lindsay Garstin - Joined the 9th Bengal Cavalry on 3 August 1877, and served in the Second Afghan War 1880 (Battle of Suakin) and led the regiment in the Chitral relief column. He possibly invented the wristwatch in the 1890s, getting a relative, Arthur Garstin (trading leather goods in Bloomsbury, London) to fashion him straps for his pocket watch. He commanded the Regiment between 1894 - 1901.
- Brigadier Miles Richard Smeeton, DSO, MBE, MC - Traveller and author
- Charles Chenevix Trench - Author and historian.
- Risaldar-Major Mir Dad Khan, OBI - Father of Pakistani general and president Ayub Khan.
- Lieutenant General Raj Mohan Vohra, PVSM, MVC - GOC-in-C of Eastern Command from May 1988 to May 1990
- Lieutenant General Gurinder Singh, AVSM - GOC-in-C of Northern Command from June 1989 to September 1991
- Lieutenant General NS Malik, PVSM - Deputy Chief of the Army Staff (Planning and Systems) September 1996 – February 1998
- Lieutenant General PPS Bhandari PVSM, AVSM - Deputy Chief of the Army Staff (Planning and Systems) January 2004 to January 2006
- Colonel Ajai Shukla - Journalist and defence writer
- Major Bikramjeet Kanwarpal - Indian film and television actor

== See also ==
- 4th Cavalry (India), a former regiment of the British Indian Army
- 4th Cavalry (Pakistan), an armoured regiment of the Pakistan Army
