= Suicide protest =

Intentionally causing one's own death as protest

Suicide and life-threatening self-harm have been in protests and militant actions by militants and political activists movements and individuals with very diverse ideologies and goals. Most notoriously they have taken the form of self immolations. Other forms have included hunger strikes, poison, and occasionally suicide bombings, though the latter commonly includes violence or has military as well as political goals.

== Self-immolation ==
=== Romas Kalanta ===
Romas Kalanta

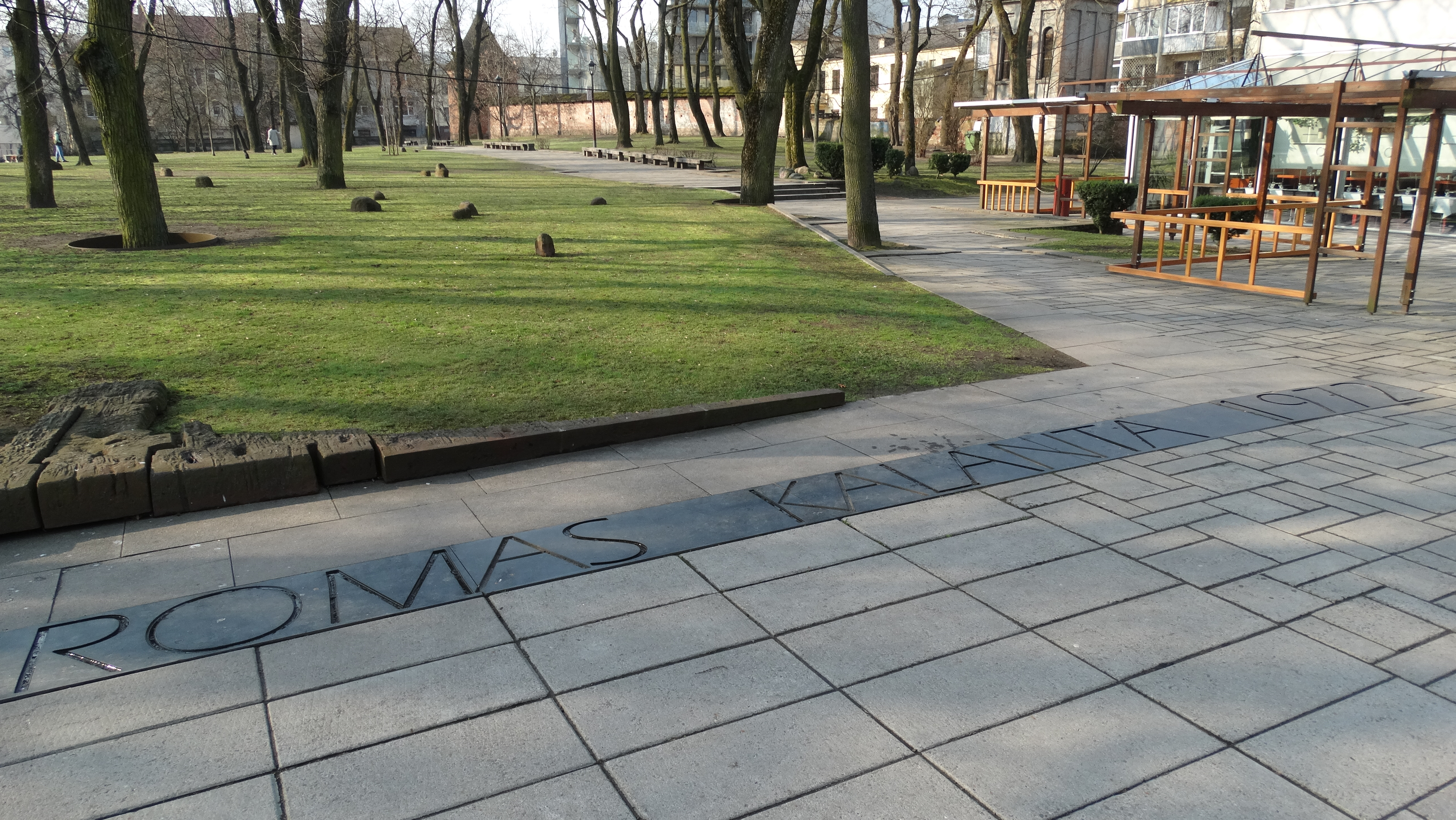
Memorial to Kalanta in Kaunas in the place of his self-immolation, it says: Romas Kalanta 1972.

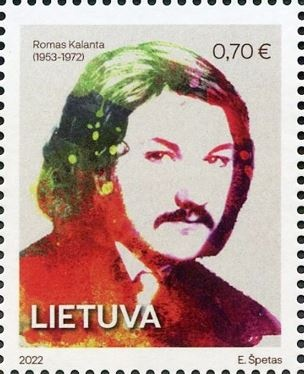
Kalanta on a 2022 stamp of Lithuania

Romas Kalanta was a 19-year-old Lithuanian student who self-immolated in 1972 to protest against the Soviet regime in Lithuania, sparking the 1972 unrest in Lithuania; another 13 people self-immolated in that same year.

=== Arab Spring ===
A wave of self-immolation suicides occurred in conjunction with the Arab Spring protests in the Middle East and North Africa, with at least 14 recorded incidents. The 2010–2011 Tunisian revolution was sparked by the self-immolation of Mohamed Bouazizi. Other cases followed during the 2011 Algerian protests and the 2011 Egyptian revolution.

== Protests about genocide and related war crimes ==
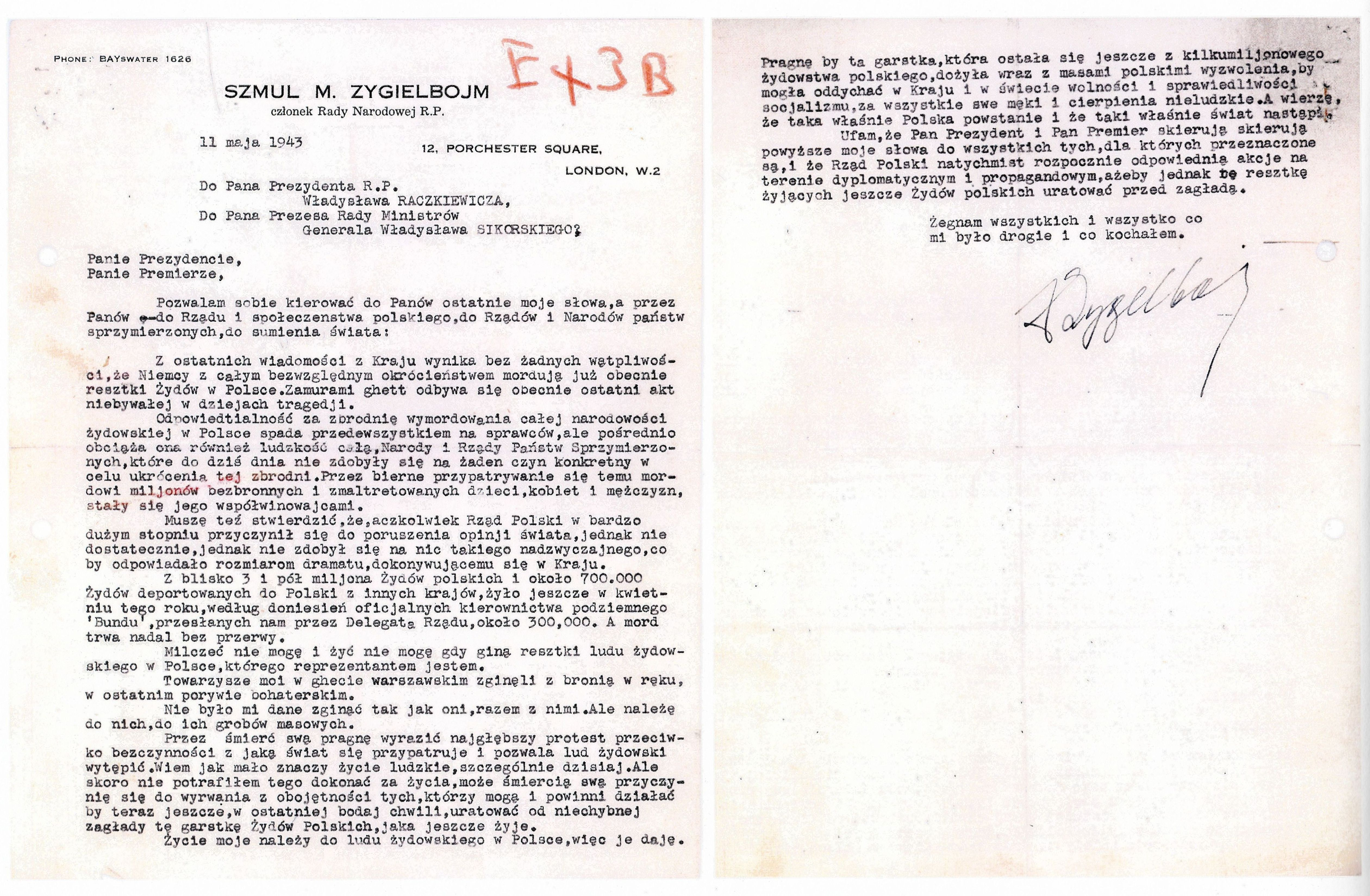
Zygielbojm's last letter, addressed to Polish president Władysław Raczkiewicz and prime minister Władysław Sikorski and dated 11 May 1943.

Suicide protests about genocide and related war crimes have been carried out by all sides: the targets of genocide, other opponents of genocide and war crimes, and (in at least one case) by a Croatian accused of war crimes in the Bosnian War (below).

=== The Holocaust in Germany and occupied Europe ===
The Holocaust in Germany and occupied Europe targeted local ethnic and religious minorities that were perceived as non-European. Particularly Ashkenazi, Roma, and Sinti. The genocide against later groups is sometimes considered a separate Romani Holocaust.

On 19 April 1943, high-ranking officials of the Allied governments of the UK and the US met in Bermuda, ostensibly to discuss the situation of the Jews in Nazi-occupied Europe. By coincidence, that same day the Nazis attempted to liquidate the remaining Jews in the Warsaw Ghetto and met with unexpected resistance. By the beginning of May, the futility of the Bermuda Conference had become apparent.

Days later, Szmul Zygielbojm (Yiddish: שמואל זיגלבוים) (Note: sometimes spelled Zygelbojm or Zigelboim) – a Polish socialist politician, Bund trade-union activist, and member of the National Council of the Polish government-in-exile – received word of the suppression of the Warsaw Ghetto Uprising and of the ghetto's final liquidation. He learned that his wife Manya and 16-year-old son Tuvia had been killed there. At his home in Paddington, West London, on 11 May 1943 Zygielbojm committed suicide with an overdose of sodium amytal, as a protest against the indifference and inaction of the Allied governments in the face of The Holocaust. He died at St Mary's Hospital, London, on 12 May 1943.

In a long suicide note addressed to Polish president Władysław Raczkiewicz and prime minister Władysław Sikorski, Zygielbojm said that while the Nazis were responsible for the murder of the Polish Jews, "the whole of humanity" was also indirectly culpable. He accused the Western Allies of "looking on passively upon this murder of defenseless millions of tortured children, women and men," and the Polish government of not doing enough (see image).

I cannot continue to live and to be silent while the remnants of Polish Jewry, whose representative I am, are being murdered. My comrades in the Warsaw ghetto fell with arms in their hands in the last heroic battle. I was not permitted to fall like them, together with them, but I belong with them, to their mass grave. By my death, I wish to give expression to my most profound protest against the inaction in which the world watches and permits the destruction of the Jewish people.

Zygielbojm wished his letter to be widely publicized and hoped that "the Polish Government [would] embark immediately on diplomatic action... in order to save the living remnant of the Polish Jews from destruction".

=== Bosnian genocide ===
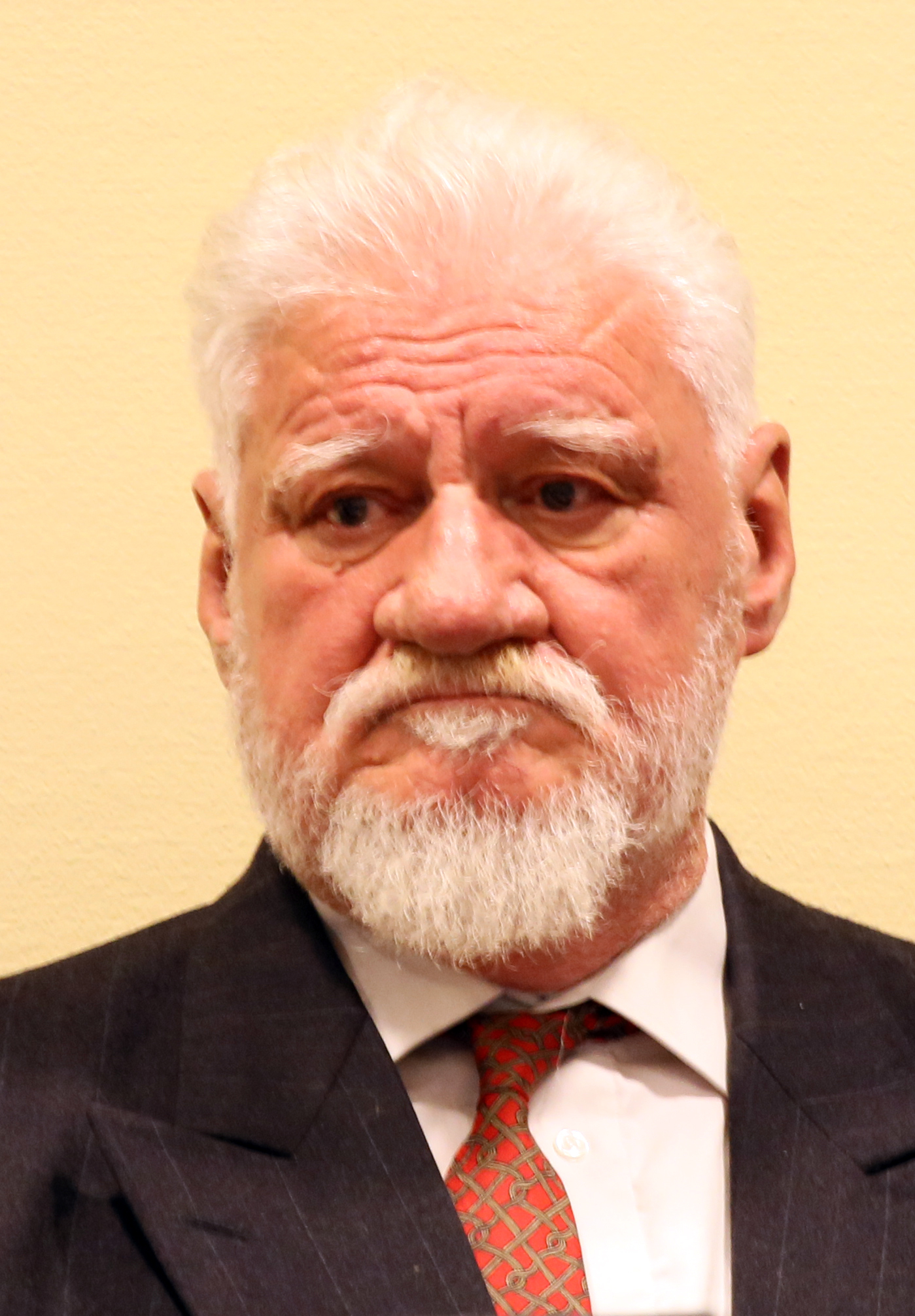
Slobodan Praljak

The Bosnian genocide a genocide against Bosnian (mostly Bosniak) Muslims in Europe, 40 years after the genocide against Ashkibazi, Roma, and Sinti. Slobodan Praljak (Croatian pronunciation: [slobǒdan prǎːʎak]; 2 January 1945 – 29 November 2017) was a Bosnian Croat general found guilty by the International Criminal Tribunal for the former Yugoslavia (ICTY) of committing violations of the laws of war, crimes against humanity, and breaches of the Geneva Conventions during the 1992–1994 Croat–Bosniak War. Praljak voluntarily joined the newly formed Croatian Armed Forces after the outbreak of the Croatian War of Independence in 1991. Before and after the war he was an engineer, a television and theatre director, and a businessman. Praljak was indicted by, and voluntarily surrendered to, the ICTY in 2004. In 2013, he was convicted for war crimes against the Bosniak population during the Croat–Bosniak War alongside five other Bosnian Croat officials, and was sentenced to 20 years in jail (minus the time he had already spent in detention). When he heard the guilty verdict against him upheld in November 2017, Praljak stated that he rejected the verdict of the court, and fatally poisoned himself in the courtroom.

=== Genocide bombing ===
"Genocide bombing" was an alternate term for Palestinian suicide attacks that was coined in 2002 by Irwin Cotler, a member of the Canadian parliament, in an effort to focus attention on the alleged intention of Genocide by militant Palestinians.

== Bombings ==
The most prolific suicide bombers were the Japanese Empire's Kamikaze and others in that region who sought direct military advantage by attacking the United States Navy and their allies, in a failed attempt to conquer the Pacific region. Some believe this is a legitimate use of suicide tactics. However, suicide bombings in the 21st century more commonly seek to make a political point.

=== Wanganui Computer Centre (1982) ===
Not all politically motivated suicide attacks targeted other people. On 18 November 1982, Neil Roberts carried out a suicide bombing in Whanganui, New Zealand. His target was a facility housing the main computer centre of the National Law Enforcement Database belonging to New Zealand Police, Courts, Ministry of Transport, and other law enforcement agencies, in Whanganui. The power of the explosion made it so that police were initially unable to determine the gender of the perpetrator. The attacker, 22-year-old Neil Roberts, a "punk rock" anarchist, was the only person killed, and the computer system was undamaged. He had written on a piece of cardboard before the explosion, "Heres [sic] one anarchist down. Hopefully there’s a lot more waking up. One day we’ll win – one day". A public toilet nearby had the slogan "We have maintained a silence closely resembling stupidity" painted on it, a slogan which the police believe Roberts had painted, and borrowed from the Revolutionary Proclamation of the Junta Tuitiva of 1809. The phrase is still closely linked with the bombing by the New Zealand public.

=== Failed and aborted suicide attacks ===
Sometimes suicide attacks that do not go according to plan, are still used successfully for political gain. For example the Lehi–Irgun suicide operation in 1947 – that failed to do any tangible damage to assets or personnel of their opponents, allegedly due to being inadvertently obstructed by Rabbi Yakov Goldman – is still told as a heroic story in numerous Likud Party speeches, including Menachem Begin's 1981 election-winning Tchach-Tchachim Speech.

== Political prisoners and imprisoned militants ==
=== Hunger strikes ===
Hunger strikes are another use of life-threatening self-harm, and actual or potential suicide, that is used by some militants and political activists.

==== 1981 Irish hunger strike ====
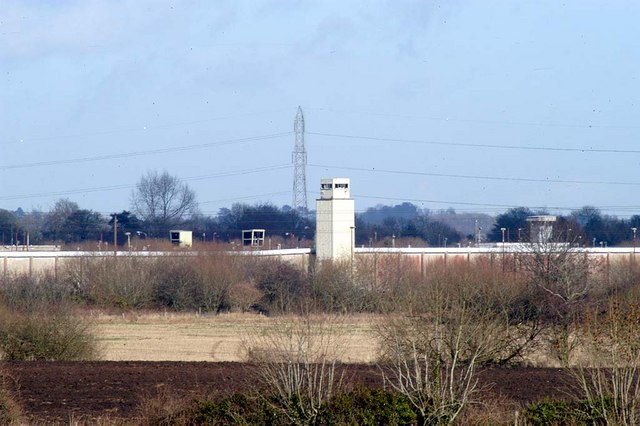
Maze prison outside of Belfast where the hunger strike took place.

In 1981 ten members of the IRA died in hunger strikers, the first was Bobby Sands. By January 1981, it became clear that the prisoners' demands had not been conceded. The republican movement—"unconvincingly", argues Kelly—blamed Britain, insisting that Thatcher had reneged on her promises. Instead, for example, of the right to their own clothes, which the prisoners believed had been conceded them, it became clear that they would have to wear prison-issued clothes until they could demonstrate full compliance with the regime. Sands saw this as "a demand for capitulation rather than a step-by-step approach", argues O'Dochartaigh, and began pressuring the external leadership to authorise another hunger strike.

==== British and American suffragettes ====
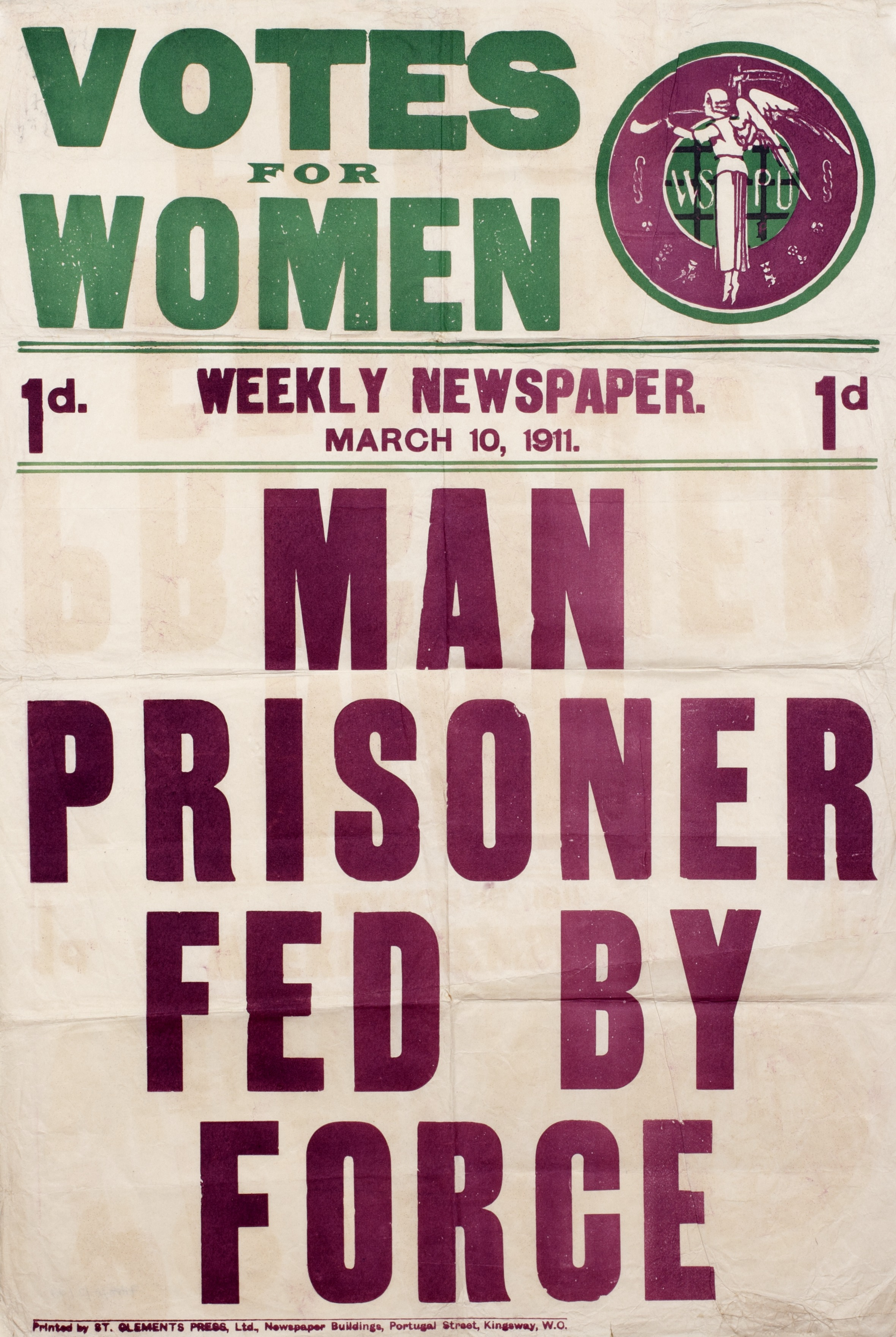
A 1911 headline in Votes for Women about William Ball being force-fed in prison to end his hunger strike

In the early 20th century suffragettes frequently endured hunger strikes in British prisons. Marion Dunlop was the first in 1909. She was released, as the authorities did not want her to become a martyr. Other suffragettes in prison also undertook hunger strikes. The prison authorities subjected them to force-feeding, which the suffragettes categorized as a form of torture. Emmeline Pankhurst's sister Mary Clarke died shortly after being force-fed in prison, and others including Lady Constance Bulwer-Lytton are believed to have had serious health problems caused by force feeding, dying of a heart attack not long after. William Ball, a working class supporter of women's suffrage, was the subject of a pamphlet Torture in an English Prison not only due to the effects of force-feeding, but a cruel separation from family contact and mental health deterioration, secret transfer to a lunatic asylum and needed lifelong mental institutional care. In December 1912, a Scottish prison put four suffragettes in the 'political prisoner' category rather than 'criminal' second division, but staff at Craiginches Prison, Aberdeen still subjected them to force-feeding when they went on hunger strike.

=== 1987 Suicide of Tamil Tigers ===
On 5 October 1987, 12 Tamil Tigers who were taken into custody by the Sri Lankan Navy died by suicide. They were brought by the Sri Lanka Army to the Palaly Military Base which was under Indian Peace Keeping Force control and detained along with 5 others. LTTE leaders including Mahattaya were allowed to visit them in the Palaly Military Base they smuggled in cyanide capsules and as they feared the cadres would be tortured if taken to Colombo. LTTE wanted the IPKF to get them released under the accord. Major General Harkirat Singh J.N.Dixit, Depinder Singh were against handing over LTTE cadres to the Sri Lankan army but due to orders from New Delhi they agreed. When Sri Lankan Army attempted to take them to Colombo for interrogation, 12 committed suicide by swallowing cyanide capsules and remaining 4 were saved in hospital. This led to the LTTE withdrawing from the Indo Lankan peace accord and conflict between the LTTE and IPKF starting. Harkirat Singh blames the diplomats and the Army headquarters for the turn of events leading to the conflict.

== See also ==
- Global topics
  - Anti-suicide blanket
  - Hunger strike
  - List of political self-immolations
  - Lists of active separatist movements
  - Martyr
  - Mass suicides
  - Prison
  - Prisoner
  - Prisoner of war
  - Protests
  - Religious views on suicide
  - Self-harm
  - Self-harm in solitary confinement
  - Suicide attack
  - Suicide in the military
  - Suicide mission
  - Suicide prevention
- Local topics
  - 1981 Irish hunger strike
  - 1987 Suicide of Tamil Tigers
  - Blanket protest
  - Custodial deaths in the United Kingdom
  - Dirty protest
  - Guantanamo Migrant Operations Center
  - Jaffna hospital massacre
  - Kent State shootings
  - LGBTQ Mormon suicides
  - March First Movement
  - March Intifada
  - Masada myth
  - Mass suicides in Nazi Germany
  - Moshe Barzani
  - Self-immolation of Aaron Bushnell
  - Thích Quảng Đức

== Sources ==
- Kelly, S. (2021). Margaret Thatcher, the Conservative Party and the Northern Ireland Conflict, 1975–1990. London: Bloomsbury. ISBN 978-1-35011-537-8.
- O'Dochartaigh, N. (2021). Deniable Contact: Back-channel Negotiation in Northern Ireland. Oxford: Oxford University Press. ISBN 978-0-19289-476-2.
- Beresford, David (1987). Ten men dead : the story of the 1981 Irish hunger strike. London: Grafton Books. ISBN 0586065334.
