= 1987 Suicide of Tamil Tigers =

On 5 October 1987, 12 Tamil Tigers who were taken into custody by the Sri Lankan Navy died by suicide. They were brought by the Sri Lankan Army to the Palaly Military Base which was under Indian Peace Keeping Force control and detained along with 5 others.

The Sri Lankan Navy on the intervening 3 and 4 October 1987 night in the seas near Point Pedro intercepted a LTTE boat coming from Tamil Nadu which has 17 LTTE cadres including Senior leaders Kumarappa the LTTE Area Commander for Batticaloa LTTE and Pulendran the LTTE area commander for Trincomalee.The LTTE cadres offered no resistance and surrendered as they thought they were covered under an amnesty under the Indo-Sri Lanka Accord. LTTE were transferring documents and wherever arms were on board was for the personal protection of the cadres.Sri Lankan government claimed they were carrying weapons. The Sri Lankan Government further wanted them to be tried in Colombo. LTTE leaders including Mahattaya were allowed to visit them in the Palaly Military Base they smuggled in cyanide capsules and as they feared the cadres would be tortured if taken to Colombo. LTTE wanted the IPKF to get them released under the accord. Major General Harkirat Singh J.N.Dixit, Depinder Singh were against handing over LTTE cadres to the Sri Lankan army but due to orders from New Delhi they agreed. When Sri Lankan Army attempted to take them to Colombo for interrogation, 12 committed suicide by swallowing cyanide capsules and remaining 4 were saved in hospital. This led to the LTTE withdrawing from the Indo Lankan peace accord and conflict between the LTTE and IPKF starting.Harkirat Singh blames the diplomats and the Army headquarters for the turn of events leading to the conflict.

== See also ==
- Ponnuthurai Sivakumaran
- IPKF
- Operation Pawan
- Jaffna hospital massacre
- 1989 Valvettiturai massacre
