= Liquidity =

Liquidity is a concept in economics involving the convertibility of assets and obligations. It can include:

- Market liquidity, the ease with which an asset can be sold
- Accounting liquidity, the ability to meet cash obligations when due
- Funding liquidity, the availability of credit to finance the purchase of financial asset
- Liquid capital, the amount of money that a firm holds
- Liquidity risk, the risk that an asset will have impaired market liquidity

== See also ==
- Liquid (disambiguation)
- Liquidation (disambiguation)
