= Valvettithurai massacre =

Valvettithurai massacre may refer to:

- 1985 Valvettithurai massacre, carried out by the Sri Lankan Army in May 1985.
- 1989 Valvettithurai massacre, carried out by the Indian Army (IPKF) in August 1989.
