= Operation Pawan =

Indian operation during Sri Lankan Civil War

- Part of Indian intervention in the Sri Lankan Civil War
Date	11–25 October 1987
Location	Jaffna Peninsula, Sri Lanka
Result	Indian Tactical Victory ; Political and Strategic Failure

Belligerents
India: Indian Peace Keeping Force	Liberation Tigers of Tamil Eelam

Commanders and leaders
(India) Rajiv Gandhi; R.I.S. Kahlon	Velupillai Prabhakaran

Units involved
Indian Armed Forces; Indian Peace Keeping Force; Indian Army; XII Corps; 340 Independent Infantry Brigade (Amphibious); Jammu and Kashmir Light Infantry; Punjab Light Infantry; 18 Infantry Brigade; 4th Battalion; Mahar Regiment; 12th Battalion, Grenadiers; 47 Infantry Brigade; 11th Battalion; Madras Regiment; 5th Battalion; Maratha Light Infantry; 14th Battalion; Sikh Light Infantry; 57 Infantry Division; 4 Mountain Division; 72 Infantry Brigade; 4th Battalion; 5th Gorkha Rifles (Frontier Force); 13th Battalion; Sikh Light Infantry; 41 Infantry Brigade; 5th Battalion; Rajputana Rifles; Parachute Regiment; 1st Battalions; 9th Battalions; 5th Battalions; Indian Navy; Indian Air Force	Liberation Tigers of Tamil Eelam; Sea Tigers; Air Tigers; Black Tigers (Details)

Strength
100,000	1200-2000

Casualties and losses
214 killed, 700 wounded 36 missing	300 killed, 100 captured

Operation Pawan was the code name assigned to the operation by the Indian Peace Keeping Force (IPKF) to take control of Jaffna from the Liberation Tigers of Tamil Eelam (LTTE), better known as the Tamil Tigers, in late 1987 to enforce the disarmament of the LTTE as a part of the Indo-Sri Lanka Accord. In brutal fighting lasting about three weeks, the IPKF took control of the Jaffna Peninsula from the LTTE, something that the Sri Lankan Army had tried but failed to do. Supported by Indian Army tanks, helicopter gunships and heavy artillery, the IPKF routed the LTTE at the cost of 214 soldiers and officers.

== Background ==
The Tamil Tigers had fought to establish a Tamil homeland, separate from Sri Lanka, in the northern and eastern portion of Ceylon (Tamil Eelam). This effort led to a series of armed conflicts with the Sri Lankan Military. In the late 1980s India, feeling considerable pressure from its Tamil citizens, began to intervene on both a diplomatic and military basis. Negotiations led to the Indo-Sri Lanka Accord, signed in Colombo on 29 July 1987, under which the Sri Lankan government agreed to give the nation's provinces more power and autonomy and withdraw its troops to their barracks. The Tamil separatists were to surrender their arms as well.

Most Tamil groups, including the Tigers, had not participated in the talks. Only reluctantly did they agree to surrender their arms to the Indian Peace Keeping Force as provided by the Accord. Even so, many separatists did not surrender their weapons, and the situation quickly flared into active confrontation. The Tigers declared their intent to continue armed struggle for an independent Tamil Eelam and refused to disarm. The IPKF soon found itself engaged in a bloody police action against the Tigers, which culminated in the separatists being cornered on the Jaffna Peninsula, at the northern end of the island. The IPKF set out to complete its mission of disarming the LTTE by taking Jaffna by force.

== The Operation ==
By 7 October, the Chief of the Army Staff (CoAS) had issued directives to the IPKF, laying down its operational parameters. It was to:

- Seize/destroy LTTE radio and TV transmission equipment in the Jaffna Peninsula
- Seize or jam the LTTE communications network
- Carry out raids on LTTE camps, caches and strongpoints
- Detain and interrogate personnel manning LTTE offices in the East to gain information. In case of resistance, force to be used.
- Actions to further consolidate the hold of the IPKF in the region

The first IPKF operation was launched on 9 October 1987. Code-named Operation Pawan (Sanskrit for 'Wind'), it was expected to neutralise LTTE operational capability in and around Jaffna. This included the capture or neutralisation of the LTTE's chain of command which was expected to leave the separatist movement directionless in the face of the impending assault on the LTTE strongholds by the IPKF.

On the nights of 9 and 10 October, the IPKF raided and captured the LTTE radio station at Tavadi and the TV station at Kokkuvil, while the printing presses of two LTTE-sponsored newspapers were destroyed. These operations also led to the capture of nearly 200 Tiger separatists. In retaliation, the LTTE ambushed a Central Reserve Police Force (CRPF) convoy near Tellippalai, killing four jawans, as well as an IPKF post at Tellipallai with automatic weapons and mortar fire on an IPKF post. Later that day the Tigers ambushed a 10 Para Commando jeep on patrol, killing all five occupants.

On 10 October the Indian 91st Brigade, consisting of three battalions and led by Brig. J. Ralli, also began its push into Jaffna.

=== The Jaffna University Helidrop ===
The first battle signalling the real beginning of Operation Pawan was the heliborne assault on the Jaffna University headquarters of the LTTE by a detachment of Indian Para (Special Forces) and Sikh Light Infantry soldiers on the night of 12 October. This was planned as a quick commando raid to capture the top LTTE leadership and local commanders who, according to Indian intelligence, were supposed to be in the building at the time and was thus expected to cut short the battle for Jaffna. The plan was to land 17 commandos from the 10th battalion of the Parachute Regiment to secure the football field. A second wave was to follow with a platoon (30 troops) from the 13th battalion of the Sikh Light Infantry. The heliborne troops were to link up with the 4th battalion of 5 Gorkha Rifles (Frontier Force) of 72 Brigade and the Sikh Light Infantry troops advancing on the ground.

The operation ended in disaster as the LTTE, having intercepted IPKF radio transmissions, set up an ambush. The heli-dropped troops came under intense fire from LTTE positions, forcing the Mil Mi-8 helicopters to abandon the insertion midway through the operation. During the ensuing battle, which lasted throughout the night, 29 of the 30 Sikh Light Infantry troops and 6 of the 17 commandos were killed in action before detachments of the 65th Armoured Regiment were able to extract the commandos from their defensive positions. After the Sikh Light Infantry platoon's signaller was shot by LTTE snipers early on in the battle, the unit lost contact with the Indian High Command at Palay Air Base. The sole survivor of the platoon, Sepoy Gora Singh, was taken prisoner by the LTTE under the command of Pawan Kashyap. It was not until his subsequent release during the conflict that the fate of the unit was known.

=== Battle for Jaffna ===
As the battle for Jaffna progressed, the IPKF advance came under intense and vicious opposition from the Tigers. Fighting in built-up and an as-yet un-evacuated Jaffna, the Indian High Command insisted that the slow advance was, in addition to Tiger resistance, more a result of reluctance on the part of the IPKF to use heavy weaponry to clear LTTE defences. Furthermore, all the approach roads had been laced with Claymore mines and explosives by the Tigers in its years of fighting with the Sri Lanka Army. The Tigers also made extensive use of improvised explosive devices (IED) which could be remotely detonated from over a kilometre away. During this time Eastern Command of the Indian Navy, supported by the Indian Coast Guard, was key in establishing a 300 miles (480 km) long blockade around northern Sri Lanka from October 1987 to disrupt the Tigers' supply and communication routes. It was at about this time that the MARCOS forces (Marine Commandos) of the Indian Navy first went into action. Detachments of the IMSF (Indian Marine Special Forces, as the MARCOS was then known), along with a battalion of the 340th Independent Brigade of the Indian Army, provided beach reconnaissance around Jaffna and Batticaloa. The 340th Brigade was one of the first IPKF units to be deployed, and served until operations in the Trincomalee area were complete. The IMSF, at this time, also provided security patrols along the coast road west of Jaffna until the 41st Brigade took charge in November.

On 15/16 October the IPKF stopped its advance to stabilise the front. Palay, the major operations headquarters for the 54th Infantry Division, was also secured from Tiger attacks. At this time the Indian Air Force undertook a massive airlift to reinforce the 91st with three brigades and heavy equipment, including T-72 tanks and BMP-1 infantry fighting vehicles. Air traffic controllers worked round the clock to fly in troops and equipment. Indian Airlines is said to have contributed to the airlift, using its Boeing 737s to deliver troops. This short interval also saw the introduction of Mi-8 transport helicopters and the first use of the Mi-25 gunships of No. 125 Helicopter Squadron, along with HAL Cheetah utility helicopters. By end of October the IAF had flown 2200 tactical transport and 800 helicopter sorties.

Now reinforced, the IPKF resumed the battle for Jaffna. The tanks and armoured fighting vehicles are said to have been effective protection against anti-personnel mines. However, even with this defence the IPKF advance was torturous in the face of the Tigers' sniper fire. They would take up positions on rooftops, in trees and even in coconut palms. Equipped with powerful telescopic infrared sights, they were able to selectively take out officers and radiomen, inflicting a heavy toll and bringing the advance to a grinding halt. Helicopters flying below 2000 feet were also vulnerable, with at least five being shot at and damaged before the Mi-25s took up their offensive role. The IPKF adapted quickly, with its officers taking off the pips of their ranks, wearing slouch hats and carrying oversize back packs. However, as the advance got bogged down, the battalions, instead of manoeuvring around the defenders, were forced to commit more troops under orders from New Delhi. In addition, the LTTE increasingly began to deploy anti-tank mines, taking a further heavy toll on IPKF forces. A frustrated IPKF cut off the power to Jaffna in an attempt to counter this. IPKF communication lines were extensively mined by the LTTE, which further compounded the sometimes perilous situations that the Indian troops faced. It has not before the commandos broke out of the besieged Jaffna port and cleared the heavily mined Navanthurai Coastal Road that a crucial link-up between 1 Maratha Light Infantry in Jaffna Fort and the advancing troops of 41st Brigade could be established that secured the Nallur area. On 21 October the commandos conducted a successful amphibious raid against an LTTE base at Gurunagar. It was also toward the end of the Jaffna campaign that the IPKF started the use of Mi-25s for close air support when they flew against LTTE positions in Chavakachcheri town on 23 October 1987.

=== Culmination ===
Ultimately, however, after two weeks of bitter fighting the IPKF had wrested control of Jaffna and other major cities from the LTTE, but operations were to continue well into November, with major operations coming to an end with the fall of Jaffna Fort on 28 November. Throughout the duration of Operation Pawan, the casualties suffered by the IPKF had been put at 600. In addition to the LTTE's defensive operations alluded to above, the IPKF's problems were compounded by the fact that the Tigers, using classic guerrilla tactics, blended in with the local population. The IPKF also came face-to-face with child soldiers of the LTTE, something it had not expected.

This was only the beginning of the IPKF's three-year campaign to neutralise the LTTE. By the time Jaffna fell, the LTTE had merely exfiltrated out of the town, moving south to the jungles of Vavuniya District. Its hardcore militants moved to the safety of the jungle by skirting the Jaffna coast from Point Pedro to Elephant Pass, sheltered by the criss-cross of waterways in the impenetrable Nittkaikulam jungle. In the Jaffna sector, although the LTTE had shifted out of the town itself, it nevertheless harassed the 54th Division's efforts to consolidate its positions using IEDs and anti-personnel mines. In turn, the IPKF was able to disrupt the LTTE's activities with regular raids that led to the capture of large caches of separatist weaponry. Brig. Manjit Singh was later replaced by Brig. J.S. Dhillon, under whom the 54th underwent considerable modifications of its operations routine. Small, highly mobile units became the staple of the 54th's operations.

The IPKF at this point still consisted mostly of an overstretched 54th Division. Following the Jaffna operation, the 36th Infantry Division, along with two additional brigades, took over the Vavuniya sector and the Trincomalee-Batticaloa axis. This relieved the 54th Division which, led by Brig. Singh, could now focus on consolidating the Jaffna sector. The 4th Mountain Division and the 57th Infantry Division were deployed still later in February 1988 to take charge of Vanni and Batticaloa from the 36th.

== Criticism ==
India's foreign intelligence agency Research and Analysis Wing (R&AW) trained the LTTE to keep a check on Sri Lanka, which had helped Pakistan in the Third Indo-Pakistani War by allowing Pakistani ships to refuel at Sri Lankan ports. When Prime Minister of India Rajiv Gandhi sent the Indian Peace Keeping Force (IPKF) in 1987 to restore normalcy in the region, the disastrous efforts of the IPKF was blamed on the lack of co-ordination between the IPKF and R&AW. Its most obvious manifestation was the Heliborne assault on LTTE HQ in the Jaffna University campus in the opening stages of Operation Pawan. The site was chosen without any consultation with the R&AW and the dropping paratroopers became easy targets for the LTTE, and a number of Indian soldiers were killed.

== Aftermath ==
The failed University of Jaffna drop and the subsequent killing of IPKF during this operation infuriated the IPKF Sikh Battalion who were stationed in Jaffna. On 21 October 1987, Hindus here were observing Diwali, IPKF stormed the largest hospital in the peninsula and massacred 70 people, which included patients, staff and doctors.

Prime Minister of India Rajiv Gandhi was assassinated as a fallout of Operation Pawan by LTTE.

== See also ==
- List of Sri Lankan Civil War battles
- Thileepan
- Annai Poopathy
- Jaffna hospital massacre
- 1989 Valvettiturai massacre

== Sources ==
- Chattopadhyaya, Haraprasad (2003), Ethnic Unrest in Modern Sri Lanka: An Account of Tamil-Sinhalese Race Relations, M.D. Publications Pvt Ltd., ISBN 81-85880-52-2
