= Joni 95 =

The Joni 95 or Jony 95 (alt. "Johnny Landmine") was an Anti-personnel mine developed by the Liberation Tigers of Tamil Eelam during the Sri Lankan Civil War.

The first version of the mine used 50 g (1.8 oz) of explosive material. The finished mine was 11 cm (4.3 in) long, 7 cm (2.8 in) wide and around 6 cm (2.4 in) thick. At the bottom it was written as 'made in' Tamil Eelam.

In 1988 LTTE was stuck in Vanni forest so they were not in a position to get materials from outside. So they used locally available wood and rubber to design the outer box.

It was named after former LTTE commander Lt. Col. Jony who was killed by IPKF on his way back to India after meeting LTTE chief Velupillai Prabhakaran at his Manal Aru hideout.

LTTE first time used this mine against Indian soldiers during IPKF's Operation Checkmate in 1988.

== See also ==
- Rangan 99
