= Genocide bombing =

Genocide bombing may refer to:

- For bombing that is used as part of a genocide, see list of genocides
- For the term referring to suicide bombing, see Suicide protest § Genocide bombing

== See also ==
- Genocide
- Genocide definitions
- Genocide denial
- Palestinian genocide accusation
- Ukraine v. Russian Federation (2022)
- South Africa's genocide case against Israel
- Allegations of genocide in the October 7 Hamas-led attack on Israel
