= Liquidator =

Liquidator may refer to:

== Business ==
- Liquidator (law), the officer who collects the assets of and settles the claims against a company before dissolving it
- Estate liquidator, the person given the job of personal estate liquidation
- Computer liquidator, a purchaser and reseller of computer technology and related equipment

== Arts ==
- "The Liquidator" (instrumental), a reggae instrumental by the Harry J Allstars
- The Liquidator (novel), the first novel of John Gardner
- The Liquidator (1965 film), a 1965 British spy film, adaptation of the novel, starring Rod Taylor
  - The Liquidator (soundtrack), the soundtrack album by Lalo Schifrin
- The Liquidator (2017 film), Chinese film
- The Liquidator (TV series), a Canadian reality television series
- The Liquidator (Darkwing Duck), fictional character in television animation

== Other ==
- An assassin
- Chernobyl liquidators, disaster-remediation workers
- Liquidators, supporters of the ideology of liquidationism in Russian Social Democratic Labor Party
- Liquidator, a water gun sold in Italy in the 1990s, similar to Super Soaker

== See also ==
- Liquidate
