= 1989 Valvettiturai massacre =

Killing of Sri Lankan Tamil civilians by Indian soldiers

Coordinates: 9°49′N 80°10′E

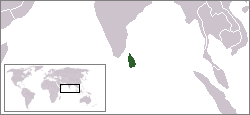
- Location of Sri Lanka
- Location: Valvettiturai, Sri Lanka
- Date: 2–3 August 1989 (+6 GMT)
- Target: Sri Lankan Tamil civilians
- Attack type: Shooting, burning, shelling
- Weapons: Guns, cannons, grenades, fire
- Deaths: 64 (52 identified, 12 missing and presumed dead)
- Injuries: 43
- Perpetrator: Indian Army soldiers of the Indian Peace Keeping Force

The 1989 Valvettiturai massacre occurred on 2 and 3 August 1989 in the small coastal town of Valvettiturai, on the Jaffna Peninsula in Sri Lanka. Sixty-four Sri Lankan Tamil civilians were killed by soldiers of the Indian Peace Keeping Force. The massacre followed an attack on the soldiers by rebel Liberation Tigers of Tamil Eelam cadres. The rebel attack had left six Indian soldiers, including an officer, dead, and another 10 injured. Indian authorities claimed that the civilians were caught in crossfire. Journalists such as Rita Sebastian of the Indian Express, David Husego of the Financial Times and local human rights groups such as the University Teachers for Human Rights have reported quoting eyewitness accounts that it was a massacre of civilians. George Fernandes, who later served as defense minister of India (1998–2004), called the massacre India’s My Lai.

== Background information ==
During the British colonial period, when Sri Lanka was known as Ceylon, most civil service jobs were (roughly 60%) held by minority Sri Lankan Tamils who were approximately 15% of the population. This was due to the availability of western style education provided by American missionaries and others in the Tamil dominant Jaffna Peninsula. The preponderance of Tamils over their natural share of the population was used by populist majority Sinhalese politicians to come to political power by promising to elevate the Sinhalese people. These measures as well as riots and pogroms that targeted the minority Sri Lankan Tamils led to the formation of a number of rebel groups advocating independence for Tamils. Following the 1983 Black July pogrom full scale civil war began between the government and the rebel groups.

In 1987 the government of Sri Lanka and India entered into an agreement and invited the Indian Army to be used as peacekeepers. Eventually the Indian Peace Keeping Force (IPKF) came into conflict with one of the rebel groups namely the Liberation Tigers of Tamil Eelam (LTTE). During October 1987 the Indian forces trying to wrest control of the Jaffna town stormed the Jaffna hospital resulting in the deaths of a number of staff and patients. By November 1987 the Indian Army was in nominal control of all major towns within the Jaffna Peninsula. But the LTTE after removing most of its fighting cadres south of the peninsula maintained a steady barrage of typical guerilla style attacks throughout 1988 and 1989. This period also saw huge loss of civilian life, claimed rapes and number of instances of mass massacres.

== Reactions ==
According to the Financial Times report, the Indians believe that the incident resulted from a deliberate provocation by the LTTE intended to trigger an overwhelming Indian response; thus tarnishing the IPKF’s image, during sensitive negotiations to leave the island nation. The Indian embassy claimed that 24 civilians were killed in crossfire. A later report on All India Radio claimed that 18 LTTE personnel and 12 civilians were killed. The statement by the Chief Minister of the North East Mr. Varadarajaperumal dismissed the local media reports as exaggerations. According to an affidavit by an eyewitness, very next day, the Commanding Officer of Vadamaradchi (region), Brigadier Shankar Prasad, the Deputy Commander, Col Aujla, and the Udupiddy Commanding Officer, Colonel Sharma met some of the survivors and apologized. George Fernandes who served as India's defence minister from 1998 to 2004 termed the massacres as India’s My Lai.
