= Gnanams Hotel =

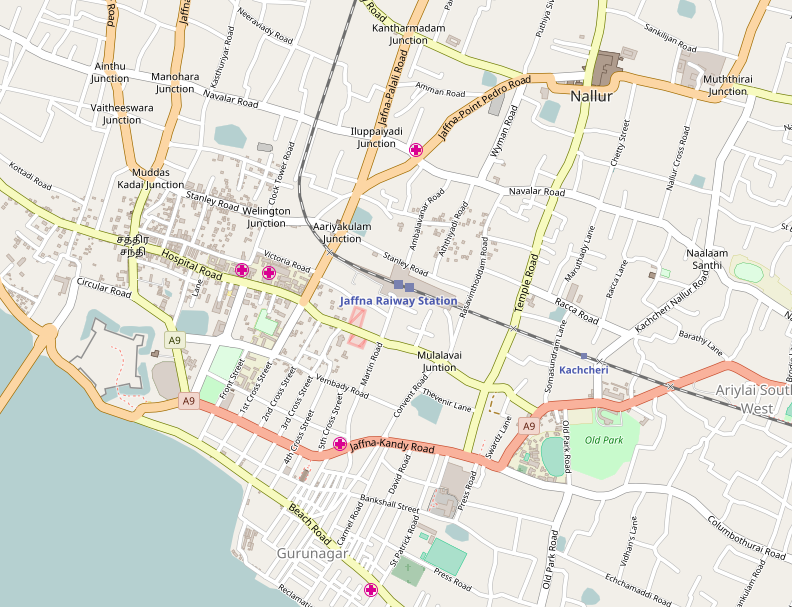
- Location within Central Jaffna

General information
- Location: 299-301 Clock Tower Road, Jaffna, Sri Lanka
- Coordinates: 9°40′01.80″N 80°0′52.20″E
- Opened: 1982
- Renovated: 1 May 2011
- Owner: Gnanams Hotel (Private) Limited

Other information
- Number of rooms: 32

Website
- gnanamshotel.webs.com

Gnanams Hotel is a hotel in the city of Jaffna in northern Sri Lanka. The 32 room hotel is located in the heart of the city on Clock Tower Road, near Jaffna Hospital. Built in 1982, during the civil war the hotel was occupied by the Sri Lankan military for 24 years. The hotel was handed back to the owners in 2011.

== History ==
The hotel was built in 1982 by Soosaipillai Gnanaprakasam. The hotel had 25 rooms. During the civil war the Sri Lankan military occupied the hotel, like they did to many buildings in the city. The hotel was the headquarters of the Sri Lanka Army's 51-2 Brigade. During the Norwegian mediated peace process the Sri Lankan military claimed it would hand the hotel back to the owners by March 2003 but this never happened. Sangarapillai Kailasapillai bought the hotel in 2010. In 2011, two years after the civil war ended, the military handed the hotel back to the owners. The hotel re-opened for business on 1 May 2011.
