= CLODO =

Neo-Luddite French anarchist organization, 1980s

Committee for Liquidation or Subversion of Computers (CLODO)
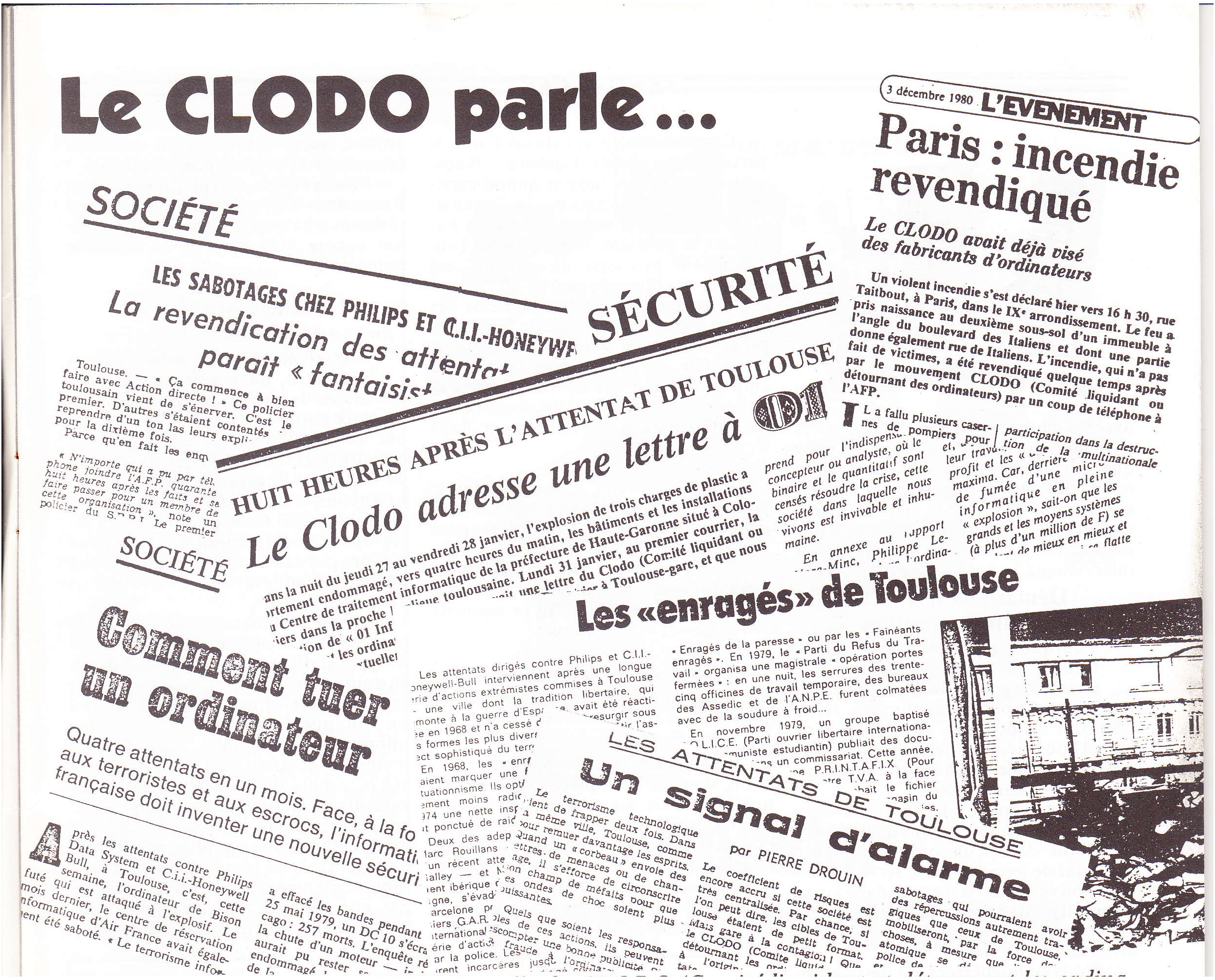
- Le CLODO Parle (The CLODO Speaks), the 1984 CLODO interview by Terminal magazine
- Formation: 1980
- Dissolved: 1983
- Type: Anarchist; Neo-Luddite
- Purpose: Anti-cyber-surveillance
- Headquarters: Toulouse, France
- Members: ad hoc, Decentralized affinity group

Committee for Liquidation or Subversion of Computers (French: Comité Liquidant ou Détournant les Ordinateurs; CLODO being a slang word for the homeless) was a French neo-Luddite anarchist organization that attacked computer and telecommunications companies in the early 1980s. The group was motivated by concerns over the growing ubiquity of telecommunications and potential misuse of computers by governments to strip freedoms from the general population. CLODO's targets were mainly located in Toulouse, France. CLODO carried out attacks in 1980 and 1983 with a two-year hiatus in-between; targets included: CII Honeywell Bull, International Computers Limited, and Sperry.

The group released a manifesto in 1983 and has been classified as inactive by the National Consortium for the Study of Terrorism and Responses to Terrorism since their final attack in December 1983. The 2022 experimental documentary Machines in Flames details CLODO's activities and ideologies. None of its members have been identified to date.

== Name ==
The initialism 'CLODO', (Comité pour la liquidation ou la destruction des ordinateurs or Committee for Liquidation or Subversion of Computers) is also a slang term for 'bum' or 'homeless' in French. CLODO would infrequently use the names Comité liquidant et détournant les ordinateurs and Comité de libération et de détournements d'ordinateurs as well. The term "détournement" refers to a strategic appropriation of a popular symbol, giving it a new meaning. The use of the term "clodo" as an initialism is believed to be an intentional act of "self-irony" and followed a larger trend of anarchist groups using humorous names and acronyms.

== History ==
CLODO began in 1980 in protest against increasing computerized surveillance by national governments and fears of increased oppression as computerization advanced. The first major attacks by CLODO occurred in April 1980: a sabotage and robbery against Philips Data Systems, and a bombing against CII Honeywell Bull's office in Toulouse. In May 1980, CLODO perpetrated an arson attack against International Computers Limited. It was estimated that 1 million francs in damage was caused by the fire, and phrases such as "No to big brother in Ireland" (Protesting British control of Northern Ireland), "No to information cop", and "1984" (in reference to the 1949 book by George Orwell) (Note: Original French: "'Non au big brother en Irland', 'Non à l'informa-flic'...'1984'") were found written in charcoal on the walls. In August 1980, CLODO carried out two failed attacks against CII Honeywell Bull's office in Louveciennes. The first attack involved a 5 kg (11 lb) explosive that failed due to a faulty detonator and the second attempt was defused prior to detonation. In September 1980, CLODO carried out an explosive attack against AP-SOGETI. In December 1980, CLODO claimed responsibility for an arson attack against a Paris Insurance Union (now named Axa) office in the 9th arrondissement of Paris. Following this, CLODO entered a period of inactivity and would not claim any attacks during 1981 and 1982.

In March 1981, an IBM computer terminal at the Banque Populaire building in Toulouse was vandalized. While CLODO did not claim the attack, the newspaper Le Matin de Paris stated the attack was "reminiscent of the habits and customs of the deceased CLODO". A 1998 investigation of CLODO in Notes & études de l'Institut de criminologie de Paris did not attribute this attack to them.

Following two years of inactivity, in January 1983, CLODO returned, detonating three explosive charges at the Computer Center of the Prefecture of Haute-Garonne. This resulted in 30 million francs in damages. That same month, police raided the radio station hosting Canal Sud, believing that CLODO's members were present. Five suspects were arrested during the raid but none were determined to be credibly connected to CLODO. Following the raid, the newspaper Libération described CLODO's actions as "gentle violence" and “terrorism without terror”, (Note: Original French: "violence douce ou de terrorisme sans terreur") citing that no one had been seriously hurt or killed during CLODO's attacks.

In October 1983, CLODO set fire to the offices of U.S. computer manufacturer Sperry in protest of Reagan's invasion of Grenada. In total, seven rooms of the building were damaged and "Reagan attacks Grenada, Sperry a multinational accomplice" (Note: Original French: "Reagan attaque-grenade Sperry multinationale complice") was found written inside a vandalized office. The attack was performed in the early morning and where members of CLODO broke into the building, piling flammable objects in an office before setting it on fire. The newspaper La Dépêche commented that CLODO was using increasingly aggressive means of carrying out their attacks, and claimed the arson attack could have resulted in casualties had a series of display cases not contained the blaze. In October 1983, following the attack against Sperry-Univac, CLODO sent a manifesto disguised as an interview to the French magazine Terminal 19/84; detailing their ideology and future plans. CLODO vandalized the National Cash Register building near Toulouse in December 1983, their last known attack.

== Ideology ==
In their manifesto, CLODO detailed the motivations, ideologies, and ultimate goals of the organization, and was composed in a question-answer format. In the manifesto, when asked why they targeted computer companies, CLODO replied: "We are essentially attacking what these tools lead to: files, surveillance by means of badges and cards, instrument of profit maximization for the bosses and of accelerated pauperization for those who are rejected..." (Note: Original French: "qu’il soit dit qu’un ordinateur n’est qu’un tas de ferraille qui ne sert qu’à ce que l’on veut qu’il serve, que dans notre monde il n’est qu’un outil de plus, particulièrement performant, au service des dominants [...] : mise en fiches, surveillance par badges et cartes, instrument de profit maximalisé pour les patrons et de paupérisation accélérée pour les rejetés.") CLODO additionally alluded to further attacks they planned to commit, and stated they planned to carry out attacks geared towards limiting the expansion and increasing ubiquity of telecommunications.

CLODO claimed to function as an ad hoc group with no formal organization or leadership, and considered themselves part of a larger movement, citing increasing public distrust in computer software and the public's concern about the potential implications technology had on limiting people's freedoms. This, more specifically, centered around fears of government oppression and increased surveillance on the populace as computers became more ubiquitous. CLODO claimed that while they did not see themselves as machine-breakers, in that they did not believe technological regression away from computers was possible, they believed that "Computer tools are undoubtedly perverted at their very origin". While CLODO never claimed an outright ideology in their manifesto, researchers have classified their ideals as Neo-Luddite in nature. In their manifesto, CLODO believed that the current intentions of advancements in computing were the "dehumanization" of employment and were being used to impose Western ideals and economic domination on third world countries. As such, CLODO's neo-Luddite beliefs formed part of a broader push-back against computerization, workplace restructuring, and "neo-Taylorist" ideologies. In 1980, CLODO released a statement to the French media in which they explained their motives. It read, (Note: Original French Text: "Nous sommes des travailleurs de l’informatique, bien placés par conséquent pour connaître les dangers actuels et futurs de l’informatique et de la télématique. L’ordinateur est l’outil préféré des dominants. Il sert à exploiter, à ficher, à contrôler, à réprimer. Demain la télématique instaurera 1984, après-demain l’homme programmé, l’homme machine.")

"We are workers in the field of dp (data processing) and telematics. The computer is the favorite tool of the dominant. It is used to exploit, to put on file, to control, and to repress."

In their manifesto, CLODO would expand on their motivations and end goals, stating, (Note: Original French: "Par nos actions, nous avons voulu souligner d'une part, la vocation dominatrice qui lui est conférée. Enfin, s'il s'est agi avant tout de propagande par le fait, nous savons aussi que nos destructions provoquent un manque à gagner et un retard non négligeable.")

"By our actions we have wanted to underline the material nature of the computer-tools on the one hand, and on the other, the destiny of domination which has been conferred on it. Finally, though what we do is primarily propaganda by the deed, we also know that the damage we cause leads to setbacks and substantial delays."

At the time of the Toulouse attacks in 1980, French police believed that CLODO was an outgrowth of Action Directe, a libertarian communist group. This was later corrected following analysis by National Consortium for the Study of Terrorism and Responses to Terrorism, who concluded "Although no proof has ever been established that CLODO was affiliated with Action Directe, it seems likely that they had some linkages, but that CLODO was focused more on an anarchist worldview, as opposed to a Marxist-Leninist philosophy." Due to CLODO's use of the term détournement, it has also been speculated that CLODO may have had some relation to Situationist International. CLODO's attacks happened in a wider context of similar attacks throughout Toulouse and a growing anti-computerization sentiment throughout France.

== Legacy ==
According to the National Consortium for the Study of Terrorism and Responses to Terrorism, CLODO has not been active since 1983. CLODO and similar group's attacks at the time resulted in a heighten awareness surrounding the security vulnerabilities of European computers. None of the members of CLODO have been identified.

In 2010, French author Celia Izoard retraced the history of the CLODO in a collective book on French luddism.

In May 2022, Thomas Dekeyser and Andrew Culp released an experimental documentary named Machines in Flames. The film's content is centered on the directors' research into CLODO, with particular emphasis on the anonymity, known activities, ideology, and mystery surrounding the organization. The film concludes with a commentary on the directors' use of technology to research CLODO, drawing contrast between the directors' use of computers and the anti-computer sentiment of CLODO.

== See also ==
- Anarcho-primitivism
- Anarchism in France
- Butlerian Jihad
- Theodore Kaczynski
- Wanganui Computer Centre bombing
