= Rangan 99 =

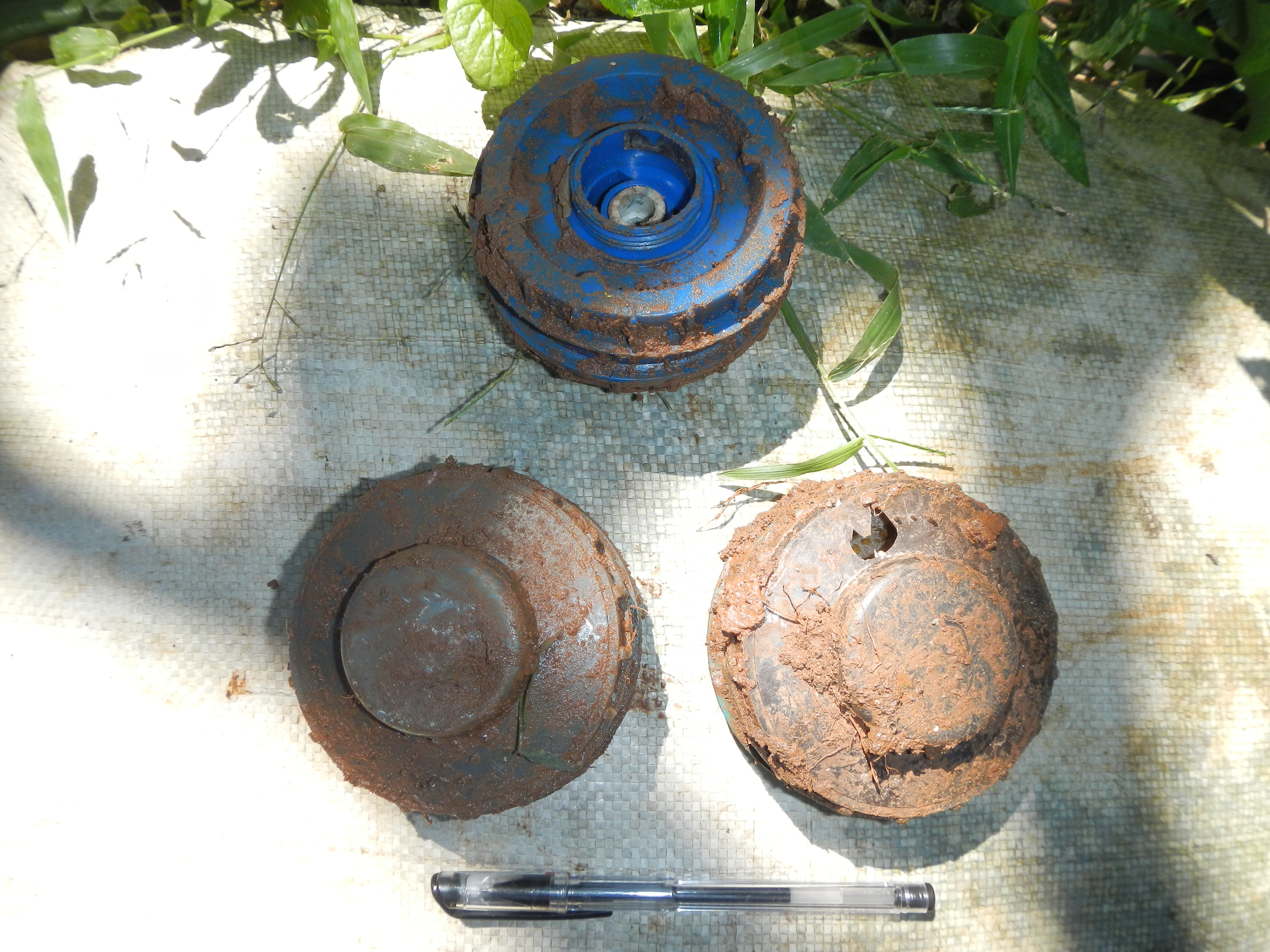

The Rangan 99 or Joni 99 is an anti-personnel blast mine introduced in 1999 by the Liberation Tigers of Tamil Eelam (LTTE), during the conflicts in Sri Lanka known as Eelam War III and Eelam War IV. The design was copied from the Pakistani P4 MK1 mine. This type of mine contains C4 explosive, and operates by pressure detection. The LTTE was reported in 2008 to be using a modified type with an electronic anti-handling device. Army de-mining teams were dealing with large numbers of Rangan 99 mines in 2010.

== See also ==
- Joni 95
