= 90th Armoured Regiment (India) =

Indian Army regiment

90 Armoured Regiment
- Active: 1979 – present
- Country: India
- Allegiance: India
- Branch: Indian Army
- Type: Armoured Corps
- Size: Regiment
- Mottos: सम्मान या बलिदान "Samaan Ya Balidaan" ("Honour or Sacrifice")

Commanders
- Colonel of the Regiment: Lieutenant General Rajesh Pushkar

Insignia
- Abbreviation: 90 Armd Regt

90 Armoured Regiment is an armoured regiment of the Indian Army.

== Formation ==
90 Armoured Regiment was raised on 15 August 1979 by amalgamating three independent reconnaissance squadrons of the Indian Army Armoured Corps, the 90 Independent Reconnaissance Squadron of the Poona Horse regiment, 92 Independent Reconnaissance Squadron of 18th Cavalry regiment and 93 Independent Reconnaissance Squadron of the 65 Armoured Regiment.

Though raised before a number of other armoured regiments, it took the number “90” from the senior-most among the reconnaissance squadrons that amalgamated to form this regiment. Lieutenant Colonel Manjit Singh Sawhney of 18 Cavalry was the first Commandant while Ris Maj Bhanwar Khan of 92 Indep Recce Sqn was the first Risaldar Major. The regiment was raised under 10th Infantry Division at Pawan Da Chak in Jammu and Kashmir. The reconnaissance squadrons merged completely with their men and equipment.

== History ==
=== Operations ===
All three squadrons took part in the Indo-Pakistan War of 1971. 90 (Independent) Reconnaissance Squadron with AMX-13 tanks was under 16 Independent Armoured Brigade of 54 Infantry Division in Shakargarh sector. 92 (Independent) Reconnaissance Squadron with their PT-76 tanks was part of the 163 Infantry Brigade and was in the Foxtrot (F) Sector. 93 (Independent) Reconnaissance Squadron, which was raised on 1 April 1970 with AMX-13 tanks was part of the 1st Armoured Division and saw action in the Punjab theatre.

Major Balraj Sharma of the regiment, while attached to 10 Battalion of the Jammu and Kashmir Light Infantry, was part of a counter-insurgency operation at Mongbung, Manipur. He and his quick reaction team were responsible for killing seven insurgents on 18 November 1995. He was awarded the Shaurya Chakra for his gallantry.

== Regimental Insignia ==
The Regimental insignia consists of crossed lances with pennons of the regimental colours of steel grey and maroon. There is the numeral "90" inscribed on the crossing of the lances, mounted with the "mailed fist" or gauntlet and a scroll at the base with the Regimental Motto in Devanagari script. The shoulder title consists of the numeral "90" in brass.

The Regimental motto is सम्मान या बलिदान (Samaan Ya Balidaan). The old motto was "अपमान से पूर्व मृत्यु"(Apamaan Se Poorva Mrityu) which translated to "Death before dishonour".
