= Annai Poopathy =

Sri Lankan activist (1932-1988)

Poopathy Kanapathipillai
- Born: November 3, 1932; Kiran, Sri Lanka
- Died: April 19, 1988 (aged 55); Batticaloa District, Sri Lanka
- Other names: Annai Poopathy, Mother Poopathy
- Occupations: Housewife, Hungerstriker
- Children: 10

Poopathy Kanapathipillai commonly known as Annai Poopathy (Mother Poopathy) (3 November 1932 - 19 April 1988) was born in a small ancient Tamil village of Kiran in Batticaloa District, Sri Lanka. She was a mother of 10 (including step children) and grandmother of one. During her lifetime two of her sons were shot and killed by the Sri Lankan government forces in separate incidents.

Later she also saw human rights abuses by Indian Peace Keeping Forces in Sri Lanka. Requesting Indian government to arrange a ceasefire between IPKF and Tamil Tigers she went on hunger strike, a fast unto death on 19 March 1988 at Mahmangam Pillayar temple for a month and died on 19 April 1988. Tamil Tiger Chief Prabhakaran said that "her sacrifice symbolized the uprising of Tamileelam motherhood and Annai Poopathy made an indelible mark in the golden history of the Tamil struggle". Her anniversary of her death is commemorated by Tamils.

== See also ==
- Thileepan
- Bobby Sands
