= Understrike =

1965 novel by John Gardner

- First UK edition (publ. Frederick Muller Ltd)
- Author: John Gardner
- Language: English
- Publication date: 1965

Understrike (1965) is a parody spy novel by John Gardner. It is the second novel in his Boysie Oakes series.

== Plot ==
When a routine mission to the United States goes haywire, Boysie Oakes is faced with the weighty responsibility of being British Special Security's observer at the important test-firing of a new missile. Unwillingly, and almost by accident, finding himself tackling 'Operation Understrike'. The test-firing of TREPHOLITE - a holocaustic missile designed to be launched from the latest thing in sub-aqua craft, USS Playboy. As the action moves at speed from New York to San Diego, Boysie meets a colourful cast of characters including his opponent Vladimir Solev, and the gorgeous Chicory Triplehouse.
