= Boysie Oakes =

- First appearance: The Liquidator
- Last appearance: A Killer for a Song
- Created by: John Gardner
- Portrayed by: Rod Taylor

In-universe information
- Gender: Male
- Occupation: Secret Agent
- Nationality: British

Boysie Oakes is a fictional secret agent created by the British spy novelist John Gardner in 1964 at the height of a period of spy fiction mania.

== Character biography ==
Oakes is mistakenly recruited into a British spy agency despite being a coward who wants to be left alone. He features in eight novels over an eleven year period and eventually becomes the head of the agency.

== Appearances ==
=== Literature ===
He appears in eleven novels: The Liquidator (1964), Understrike (1965), Amber Nine (1966), Madrigal (1967), Founder Member (1969), Traitor's Exit (1970), The Airline Pirates (1970), published in the U.S. as Air Apparent, and A Killer for a Song (1975).

He also appears in the short stories A Handful of Rice and Corkscrew in Hideaway (1968) and in the short stories Boysie Oakes and The Explosive Device and Sunset At Paleokastritsa in The Assassination File (1974).

=== Film ===
The first novel in the series, The Liquidator, was made into a feature film of the same name in 1965, starring Rod Taylor as Boysie Oakes.
