= Urelu =

Urelu ஊரெழு
- Location within Northern Province
- Country: Sri Lanka
- Province: Northern Province
- District: Jaffna
- Divisional Secretariat: Valikamam East

Population (2012)
  - Total: 3,286
- Time zone: UTC+5:30 (Sri Lanka Standard Time)

Urelu is a small town in Sri Lanka. It is located within Northern Province. Urelu is located south of Punnalaikkadduvan, west of Achchelu east of Chunnakam and north of Urumbrai. In 2012, Urelu had a population of 3,286.

Thileepan, a member of the Liberation Tigers of Tamil Eelam who went on hunger strike on 15 September 1987 until his death 11 days later, was born in Urelu.

== See also ==
- List of towns in Northern Province, Sri Lanka
