= Wanganui Computer Centre bombing =

1982 protest and bombing in New Zealand

- Location: 39.9306°S 175.0564°E; Whanganui, New Zealand
- Date: 18 November 1982 c. 12:35 am (NZDT)
- Target: National Law Enforcement System mainframe
- Attack type: Suicide bombing
- Deaths: 1 (perpetrator)
- Perpetrator: Neil Roberts

The Wanganui Computer Centre bombing occurred in Whanganui, New Zealand, in 1982. The event was carried out to protest New Zealand's ability to record the personal information of citizens which was seen as potentially dangerous by civil libertarians. The Computer Centre continued to operate until its closure in 2005.

== Wanganui Computer Centre ==
Proposed by the National Party at the 1972 general elections and picked up by the Labour Party after they became the government, the computer system was initially proposed to be called the Law Enforcement Data System (Wanganui), then called the Justice Data Bank, until the name National Law Enforcement Data Base was settled on.

=== Wairere House ===
Sited on the corner of Bates Street and Somme Parade, "Wairere House" was the name given to the purpose-built building for the Wanganui Computer from the time of its initial construction in 1974. A large re-enforced three story building, it only has windows on the top floor, giving it the appearance of a fortified bunker. Building construction was overseen by the Ministry of Works, on behalf of the Government. Computer installation began in May 1975, with the system, itself, being operational by 1976, although data entry continued until 1978. The building was purchased by the National Library in 1997 to hold some of their heritage collections, as well as being sub-tenanted to private organisations.

=== Wanganui Computer ===
Established in 1976 under the Wanganui Computer Centre Act the "Wanganui Computer" was New Zealand's first national law enforcement computer system, holding the personal information about many New Zealanders in relation to motor vehicles, driver's and firearms licences, crime and traffic offending and criminal convictions. It allowed law enforcement agencies, including the Police, Transport, Courts, and Corrections, among others, to share information via a nationwide network of computer terminals. Described as "the most significant crime-fighting weapon ever brought to bear" [in New Zealand] by then Police Minister Allan McCready. For its time, the Wanganui Computer broke new ground and was a controversial initiative in the mass storage of New Zealanders' personal information on a computer system. In 1995, the Wanganui Computer was moved to Auckland and the Centre was closed.

== Bombing ==
On 18 November 1982, a suicide bomb attack was made against a facility housing the main computer system of the New Zealand Police, Courts, Ministry of Transport and other law enforcement agencies, in Wanganui. The power of the explosion made it so that police were initially unable to determine the gender of the perpetrator. The attacker, a "punk rock" anarchist named Neil Roberts, was the only person killed, and the computer system was undamaged. He had written on a piece of cardboard before the explosion, "Heres [sic] one anarchist down. Hopefully there's a lot more waking up. One day we'll win – one day." A public toilet nearby had the slogan "We have maintained a silence closely resembling stupidity" painted on it, a slogan which the police believe Roberts had painted, and borrowed from the Revolutionary Proclamation of the Junta Tuitiva of 1809. The phrase is still closely linked with the bombing by the New Zealand public.

== Commemorations ==
Between 1986 and 1989, Neil Roberts Day (18 November) was commemorated with gatherings in the Moutoa Gardens. The commemorations were revived in 2015, 2017 and 2018 with various punk bands from around the country performing at concerts held in the Duncan Pavilion at Castlecliff in Whanganui.

== In popular culture ==
In 1984, a short was produced titled The Maintenance of Silence. The film portrays a young man named Eric probing into the facts of the bombing. The protagonist is disturbed by being awakened in Auckland at the exact moment of the bombing in Wanganui. Eric becomes absorbed in pondering the character and fate of Neil Roberts.

Rochelle Bright wrote a musical play about Neil Roberts in 2015 as part of her residency at the Michael King Writers Centre in Auckland.

The graffitied sentence "We have maintained a silence closely resembling stupidity" has been used by New Zealand artist Ann Shelton in various works, notably as part of her "Doublethink" installation (2013) and exhibition "The City of Lead and Gold" (Sarjeant Gallery, Wanganui, 2013).

An article from Radio New Zealand's 'The Wireless' paints a richer picture: An Anarchist With A Death Wish

== See also ==
- CLODO
- Terrorism in New Zealand
