= 65th Armoured Regiment (India) =

Indian Army regiment

- Active: 1966 – present
- Country: India
- Allegiance: India
- Branch: Indian Army
- Type: Armour
- Size: Regiment
- Mottos: मान या मृत्यु Maan ya Mrityu (Glory or Death)
- Colors: Scarlet and Black
- March: Belphegor
- Equipment: T-90
- Decorations: Vir Chakra 1 Sena Medal 5 Vishisht Seva Medal 2 COAS Commendation Card 18; GOC-in-C Commendation Card 18

Commanders
- Colonel of the Regiment: Lieutenant General Mohit Malhotra
- Notable commanders: Brig KK Kaul, Maj Gen RS Pannu, Maj Gen DSC Rai, Maj Gen DK Mehta, Brig SM Sahni, Maj Gen Rajan Aney, Maj Gen IP Singh, Lt Gen Taranjit Singh, Brig D Dahiya, Brig Mayamk Awasthi

Insignia
- Abbreviation: 65 Armd Regt

65th Armoured Regiment, is an armoured regiment which is part of the Armoured Corps of the Indian Army.

== Formation ==
Raised after the Indo-Pakistani War of 1965, on 1 September 1966, as the 65th Cavalry, its designation was changed to 65th Armoured Regiment in August 1967. The first commanding officer was Lieutenant Colonel (later Brigadier) K.K. Kaul. The class composition was Dogras, Jats and Rajputs.

== Equipment ==
The regiment was initially equipped with the upgunned Sherman Mk IV and Mk V tanks. It was later equipped with Vijayanta tanks. The 93rd (Independent) Reconnaissance Squadron was raised with AMX-13 tanks. The regiment subsequently converted to T-72 tanks.

== History ==
The President of India Late Shri Fakhruddin Ali Ahmed presented a guidon to the regiment on 11 November 1976.

== Operations ==
Indo-Pakistani War of 1971

The regiment was part of 1st Armoured Division during the Indo-Pakistani War of 1971 and was located in the general area of Muktesar and Malaut but did not see any action.

Operation Pawan

65th Armoured Regiment was one of the first regiments in the Army to be equipped with T-72 tanks. Along-with its new tanks, it proceeded to Sri Lanka during Operation Pawan. It was one of the first units to reach Sri Lanka, arriving in Jaffna in October 1987, and was amongst the last to de-induct, returning to India in March 1990. The regiment performed a wide variety of roles including clearing road-blocks, keeping railways and roads open, ambushes and raids. The regiment lost an officer, one JCO and 15 soldiers killed, and nine soldiers wounded. A troop of tanks of "A" Squadron of the Regiment was the first to be airlifted to Jaffna and they participated in the battle of the Jaffna University along with 72 & 115 Infantry Brigades under 54 Infantry Division. This action culminated in the subsequent relief of Jaffna Fort. The troop was later augmented by the complete squadron. It was during this action that the Regiment earned its first gallantry awards in combat: one Vir Chakra and one Sena Medal (Posthumous).

Other operations

It has participated in Operation Trident in the Western sector; in Operation Rakshak II (J&K CI Ops) at Patnitop, Batote, Banihal, Ramban and Nachna; in the plains of Jammu and Kashmir during Operation Vijay and in Operation Parakram.

== Reconnaissance squadron ==
On 1 April 1970, 93rd (Independent) Reconnaissance Squadron was raised with AMX-13 tanks and was placed in the order of battle of 1st Armoured Division during the Indo-Pakistan War of 1971. The Squadron saw action in the Punjab theatre during the 1971 Indo-Pak war. Subsequently, it was located in Malerkotla and re-equipped with the Vijyanta tanks. In 1979, this squadron along-with two others, 90th & 92nd of the Poona Horse & 18th Cavalry respectively, was merged to form 90 Armoured Regiment.

== Regimental insignia ==
The cap badge at the time of raising was the generic Armoured Corps badge and shoulder title comprised the letters "65C" in brass. The regiment was in the process of designing a badge which comprised crossed lances with scarlet and black pennons, and the numerals "65" at the crossing, with the regimental motto on a scroll along the base of the lances. It was the first-ever armoured regiment of Indian origin to adopt the scarlet backing of the cap badge and scarlet shoulder flashes. Also, it was the first unit where NCO's sported scarlet chevrons of rank against the traditional white.

Just then, an order was issued by Army Headquarters that all newly raised regiments would no longer use the terms "Cavalry" or "Lancers", but instead be called "Armoured Regiments". The 65th was the first to take up the new designation. Accordingly, the cap badge was amended to include a small scroll below the numbers with the script "ARMD REGT" inscribed, which was barely visible. The more visible lower scroll carries the regimental motto, मान या मृत्यु (Maan Ya Mrityu), which translates to ‘Glory or Death’.

The regimental flag has the regimental badge in the centre and is in two colours – Scarlet and Black.

== Previous commanders ==
Brig KK Kaul, Maj Gen RS Pannu, Maj Gen DSC Rai, Maj Gen DK Mehta, Col GS Bhullor, Brig SM Sahni, Col SL Kapur, Maj Gen Rajan Aney, Col VK Dougall, Col SP Khanna, Col AS Bhinder, Col Anil Kaul, VrC (Second Generation), Maj Gen IP Singh, Col Anil Talwar, Col Parminder Singh, SM, Lt Gen Taranjit Singh, Brig D Dahiya, Brig Mayank Awasthi, Col Sandeep Kapur (Second Generation), Col Amitesh Verma, Col R Pachora, Col AA Chaturvedi.
