= National Law Enforcement System =

New Zealand government database

The National Law Enforcement System, better known as the Wanganui Computer, was a database set up in 1976 by the State Services Commission in Wanganui, New Zealand. It held information which could be accessed by New Zealand Police, Land Transport Safety Authority and the justice department.

The Wanganui computer was a Sperry mainframe computer built to hold records such as criminal convictions and car and gun licences. At the time it was deemed ground-breaking, with Minister of Police, Allan McCready, describing it as "probably the most significant crime-fighting weapon ever brought to bear against lawlessness in this country".

Seen by many as a Big Brother initiative, the database was controversial, attracting numerous protests from libertarians with concerns over privacy. The most notable event was in 1982, when self-described anarchist punk Neil Roberts, aged 22, detonated a home-made gelignite bomb upon his person at the gates of the centre, making him New Zealand's highest-profile suicide bomber. The blast was large enough to be heard around Wanganui, and Roberts was killed instantly, being later identified by his unique chest tattoo bearing the words "This punk won't see 23. No future."

The centre survived this and other protests until the 1990s when the operation was transferred to Auckland, although this new system has retained its Wanganui moniker. The original database, having lasted 30 years and growing increasingly outdated, was finally shut down in June 2005, with the responsibility being successfully handed over to Auckland at the National Intelligence Application (also known as NIA).

The building, known as 'Wairere House' was later occupied by the National Library of New Zealand and contained newspaper archives.

== See also ==
- INCIS
