= The Liquidator (1965 film) =

1965 British film by Jack Cardiff

- Original UK quad cinema poster featuring Richard Willams artwork
- Directed by: Jack Cardiff
- Written by: Peter Yeldham
- Based on: The Liquidator; 1964 novel by John Gardner
- Produced by: Leslie Elliot; Jon Pennington
- Starring: Rod Taylor; Trevor Howard; Jill St. John; John Le Mesurier
- Cinematography: Edward Scaife
- Edited by: Ernest Walter
- Music by: Lalo Schifrin
- Production company: Metro-Goldwyn-Mayer
- Distributed by: Metro-Goldwyn-Mayer (1965, original) Warner Bros. (2012, DVD)
- Release date: November 1965 (UK)
- Running time: 105 minutes
- Country: United Kingdom
- Language: English
- Box office: $1,175,000 (est. US/ Canada rentals); 23,498 admissions (France)

The Liquidator is a 1965 British-made, MGM-produced and distributed thriller film directed by Jack Cardiff and starring Rod Taylor, Trevor Howard, and Jill St. John. Wilfrid Hyde-White, Akim Tamiroff, Gabriella Licudi, Eric Sykes, and David Tomlinson appear in support. The picture was based on The Liquidator (1964), the first of a series of Boysie Oakes novels by John Gardner.

== Plot ==
During the Allies' occupation of Paris late in World War II, bumbling tank corps Sergeant "Boysie" Oakes stumbles when responding to a fellow Englishman's call for help, and unwittingly shoots and kills two men attempting to assassinate British Intelligence Major Mostyn. A grateful Mostyn mistakenly believes Oakes is a born killer.

Twenty-one years later, Mostyn (then a colonel in British Intelligence) and his boss are in trouble due to a series of embarrassing security leaks. To save his job, the chief orders Mostyn to hire an assassin to illegally eliminate security problems without official authorisation. Mostyn recruits Oakes into MI5 without first telling him what his employment will entail, luring him in with a lavish apartment and a fancy sports car. After Oakes passes a training course, Mostyn informs him that his code name is "L", for "Liquidator", and he is employed as a paid assassin. Unable to resign and not at all a killer by nature, Oakes secretly hires freelance contract killer Griffin to do the dirty work.

Oakes is drawn to Mostyn's sexy secretary Iris, in spite of Mostyn's explicit detailing of an Agency prohibition against spies and civilian employees fraternising. Determined to risk grave consequences, the womanizing Oakes persuades Iris to spend the weekend with him on the Côte d'Azur. Falling for a lure, Oakes is captured by enemy agents led by Sheriek, who firmly believes he is on assignment in the south of France rather than there on an assignation. Sheriek demands to know who Oakes' target is. However, Sheriek's superior, Chekhov, is coldly furious that he has gone beyond his orders to merely surveil Oakes, and has endangered a much more important operation. He has Sheriek arrange for Oakes to escape.

Agent Quadrant, an Agency higher-up, arrives with a new mission for Oakes. He is to stage a fake assassination attempt on the Duke of Edinburgh when he visits a Royal Air Force base, to test its security. Just before pulling the trigger of a telescopic sniper rifle he has been assured is full of blanks, Oakes recognizes that Mostyn has taken the Duke's place in the troop inspection, and Quadrant is actually an enemy agent. While Mostyn and Oakes are distracted (with Mostyn challenging Oakes's loyalty), Quadrant and an accomplice steal an advanced Vulture supersonic nuclear bomber. Oakes manages to wound Quadrant and board the plane before it can take off. To his surprise, its pilot is none other than Iris, who informs him that she is actually the coordinator of the entire operation. He is able to overpower her and between autopilot and an experienced Vulture pilot "talking him down", he is able to return the aircraft to the base.

No sooner is he down than Oakes is eyeing Mostyn's new - and equally ravishing -secretary. More trouble lies ahead.

== Cast ==
- Rod Taylor as "Boysie" Oakes
- Trevor Howard as Major/Colonel Mostyn
- Jill St. John as Iris
- Wilfrid Hyde-White as Chief (as Wilfrid Hyde White)
- David Tomlinson as Quadrant
- Akim Tamiroff as Sheriek
- Eric Sykes as Griffin
- Gabriella Licudi as Corale
- John Le Mesurier as Chekhov
- Derek Nimmo as Fly
- Jeremy Lloyd as young man
- Jennifer Jayne as Janice Benedict
- Heller Toren as assistant
- Betty McDowall as Frances Anne
- Jo Rowbottom as Betty
- Colin Gordon as Vicar
- Louise Dunn as Jessie
- Henri Cogan as Yakov
- Daniel Emilfork as Gregory
- Scott Finch as operations officer (as Scot Finch)
- Ronald Leigh-Hunt as Mac
- Richard Wattis as flying instructor
- David Langton as station commander
- Tony Wright as flying control
- Suzy Kendall as Judith, Mostyn's new secretary
- Ken Wayne as tank crewman

== Production ==
Producer Jon Pennington brought Australian screenwriter Peter Yeldham to the project after both had cooperated on The Comedy Man (1963). Yeldham recalled that Pennington acquired the novel, read it on an airplane, and set the film into production in four or five months. As with the first of a projected Jason Love series Where the Spies Are (1966), also filmed in MGM-British Studios, MGM planned a Boysie Oakes film series. Producer Sydney Box spoke to Yeldham and wished him to write two more scripts in the projected series.

Cardiff recalled that the censors insisted that one of Taylor's lines, "...it smells like a Turkish wrestler's jockstrap", be deleted.

Richard Harris was initially approached for the role but after negotiations chose to do The Heroes of Telemark (1965) instead. Taylor insisted on playing the role with an American accent because he was more comfortable with it by that stage in his career.

The Liquidator started filming in Nice, France on 5 April 1965, with interiors filmed later at MGM-British Studios in Borehamwood.

The film opens with animated titles by the Richard Williams studio.

== Soundtrack ==
The original score was composed by Lalo Schifrin and includes a driving main title vocal theme and a soft end title theme ("My Liquidator"), both sung by Shirley Bassey. Other than the "Goldfinger"-type title song, Schifrin deliberately avoided the John Barry James Bond style of music.

== Release ==
Release of the film was held up a number of months due to a legal conflict between producer Leslie Elliot and MGM. Jack Cardiff thought this hurt the final box office result of the film, which was disappointing.

== Critical reception ==
The Monthly Film Bulletin wrote: "After a promising beginning, with a gravel-voiced Trevor Howard putting his private executioner through the niceties of his assassination programme, it is not long before this further sortie into sub-Bondian territory begins to look like a very poor relative. The cast make what they can of a script that strives after witty effect and ends up looking only like a pastiche of the spy film formula. Rod Taylor looks a little flabby as the reluctant assassin, but he does manage to make the character appealing, and Trevor Howard wickedly proves how dialogue can be made to sound better than it is; and there is an amusing interlude in the shape of Akim Tamiroff as a blundering torturer doing his best to look villainous. But these are the only flashes of light in a generally gloomy film."

The Radio Times Guide to Films gave the film 2/5 stars, writing: "This is one of dozens of Bond ripoffs, right down to Shirley Bassey belting out the title number. ... Very swinging 1960s in tone, with jet-set locations, snazzy cartoon titles and willing ladies in mini-skirts."

== Home media ==
The Liquidator was released to DVD by Warner Home Video on 6 September 2012 via the Warner Archive DVD-on-demand service.
