= Liquidation (disambiguation) =

Liquidation is the conversion of a business's assets to money in order to pay off debt.

Liquidation may also refer to:

- Assassination, the willful killing of a person
- Estate liquidation, an elaborate estate sale
- Fragmentation (music), a compositional technique
- Liquidation (miniseries), a Russian television series

== See also ==
- Liquidator (disambiguation)
- Liquidationism, in Marxist theory
- Liquefaction, the process of becoming a liquid
