= Liquid (disambiguation) =

Liquid is a phase of matter.

Liquid or liquidity may also refer to:

== Business ==
- Accounting liquidity, the ability of a debtor to pay their debts as and when they fall due
- Liquid capital, the amount of money that a firm holds
- Market liquidity, the ability to buy or sell a particular commodity quickly without causing a significant price fluctuation

== Music and dance ==
- Liquid funk, a subgenre of drum and bass
- Liquid dancing, a form of dance in which a dancer's gesticulations flow fluidly
- Liquid (musician), a British dance act
- Liquid (EP), an EP by Le1f & Boody
- Liquid (Recoil album), a 2000 music album by Recoil
- Liquid, a 2009 music album by Urlaub in Polen
- "Liquid", a song by Jars of Clay from their eponymous album
- "Liquid" (The Rasmus song), a 1998 song by The Rasmus
- "Liquid", a song by Brockhampton from Saturation III
- "Liquid", a song by Joe Morris from Singularity

== Science and technology ==
- Liquid, a template engine from the e-commerce system Shopify
- Liquid crystal, substances that exhibit a phase of matter that has properties between those of a conventional liquid and those of a solid crystal
- Liquid layout, a web design that does not rely upon fixed widths
- Liquid nitrogen vehicle, a vehicle powered by liquid nitrogen, which is stored in a tank
- Liquidambar, or liquid amber, a genus of four species of flowering plants in the family Altingiaceae

== Other uses ==
- Liquid consonant, a category of consonants characterized by similarity to /l/ or /r/, particularly those approximant consonants that do not have a corresponding vowel
- Liquid Snake, a character in the Metal Gear video game franchise
- Liquid Entertainment, a computer game development company
- Team Liquid, an electronic sports team and community website

== See also ==
- Drink
