= Rita Sebastian =

Sri Lankan journalist

Rita Sebastian (died 29 March, 1996) was a Sri Lankan journalist. She was the first Sri Lankan woman to be appointed editor of a newspaper.

== Biography ==
Sebastian was fluent in both Sinhala and Tamil languages, and reported on the Tamil separatist war in the north of the country and the JVP insurgency in the south from the frontlines of the conflicts.

She was the Sri Lankan correspondent for the Indian Express, Inter Press Service, Kyodo News Agency and other international news agencies. She was a writer for The Sunday Times and became the newspaper's editor.
