= Operation Checkmate (Sri Lanka) =

Military operation

Operation Checkmate was an anti-insurgency operation carried out by the Indian Peace Keeping Force (IPKF) against the Liberation Tigers of Tamil Eelam (LTTE) in the Vadamarachi area of northern Sri Lanka in June 1988. Initiated immediately prior to the elections in the north eastern provinces, the aim of the operation was to destroy the Tigers' capacity to hinder the electoral process, which they had called to boycott.
