= The Liquidator (novel) =

1964 novel written by John Gardner

- First US edition (publ. Viking)
- Author: John Gardner
- Language: English
- Publication date: 1964

The Liquidator (1964) was the first novel written by John Gardner and the first novel in his Boysie Oakes series.

After publishing his autobiographical account of alcoholism Spin the Bottle, Gardner decided to write a thriller, which he later described as "a pretentious piece of rubbish about how governments went around legally killing people". When he sent the first four chapters to his literary agent, the latter summoned him to London and told him the book was "truly dreadful"; but went on to suggest that as he had "made a hash of drama", perhaps he should try his hand at comedy. Inspired by the James Bond series of Ian Fleming novels and films, Gardner wrote his book with the character of Brian "Boysie" Oakes as an anti-Bond.

The success of the novel led to several more in the series, and interest from MGM in a Boysie Oakes film series, with only The Liquidator made in 1965 with Rod Taylor as Boysie. One of Gardner's Boysie Oakes short stories "A Handful of Rice" mentions an actor named "Roy Buster" that expressed Gardner's impressions of Taylor.

New York Times Book Review reviewer Anthony Boucher remarked "Gardner succeeds in having it both ways; he has written a clever parody which is also a genuinely satisfactory thriller".

== Plot ==
In Paris in 1944 Tank Corps Sergeant Boysie Oakes kills two Germans attempting to assassinate an Intelligence Corps officer named Mostyn. Twenty years later Mostyn's memories have transformed Oakes (who is in reality cowardly and hedonistic) into a fearless master assassin though nothing could be further from the truth. Mostyn recruits Oakes into the Secret Service where after a training course he is given an enviable lifestyle. Oakes' function is to "liquidate" security risks for the State. Oakes hires a mild-mannered professional assassin to do his dirty work for him.

Going for a "dirty weekend" leads to Boysie being captured by enemy agents who involve him in an assassination plot.
