= Jaffna Teaching Hospital =

Hospital in Northern Province, Sri Lanka

- Ministry of Health, Sri Lanka

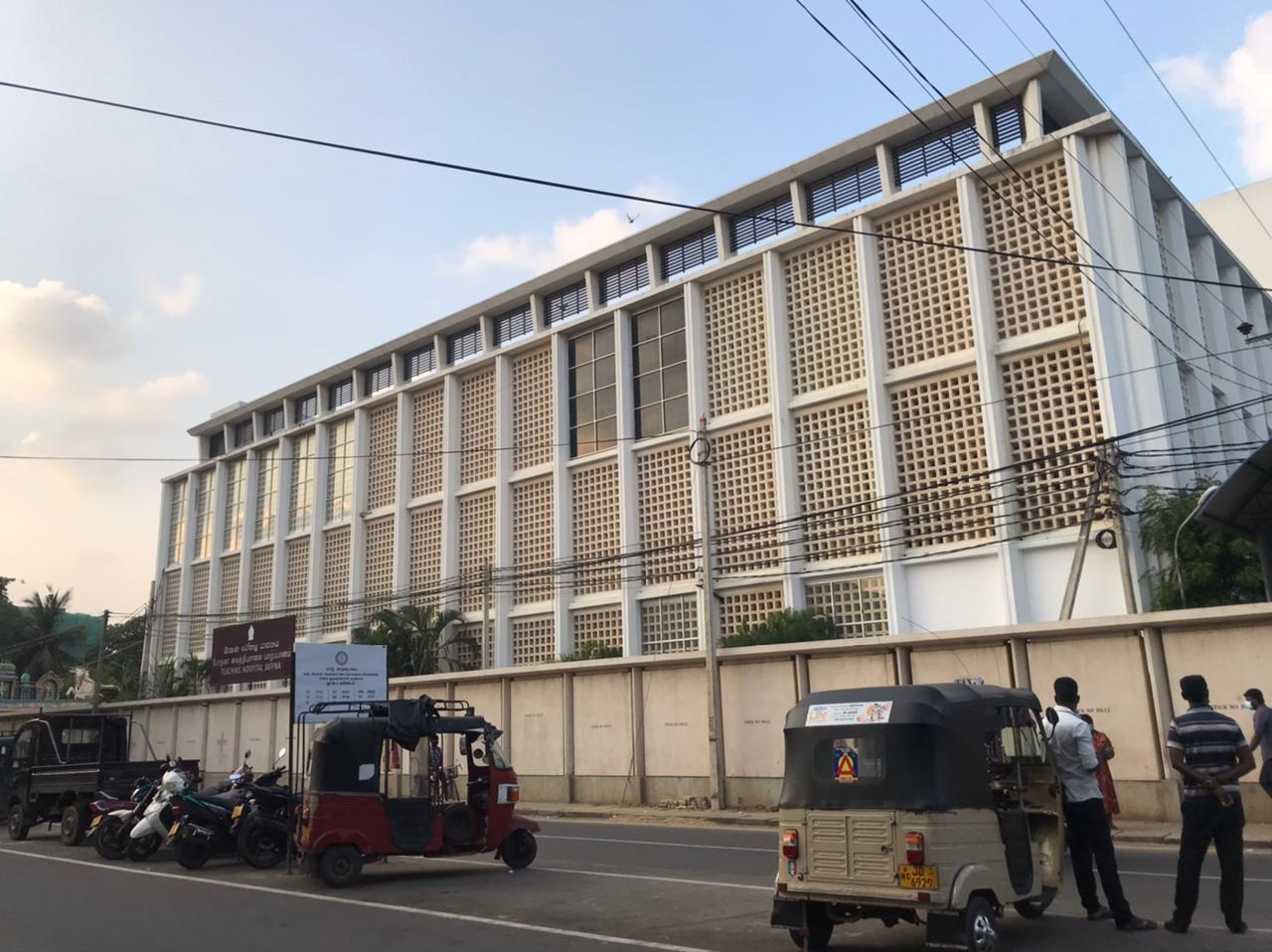

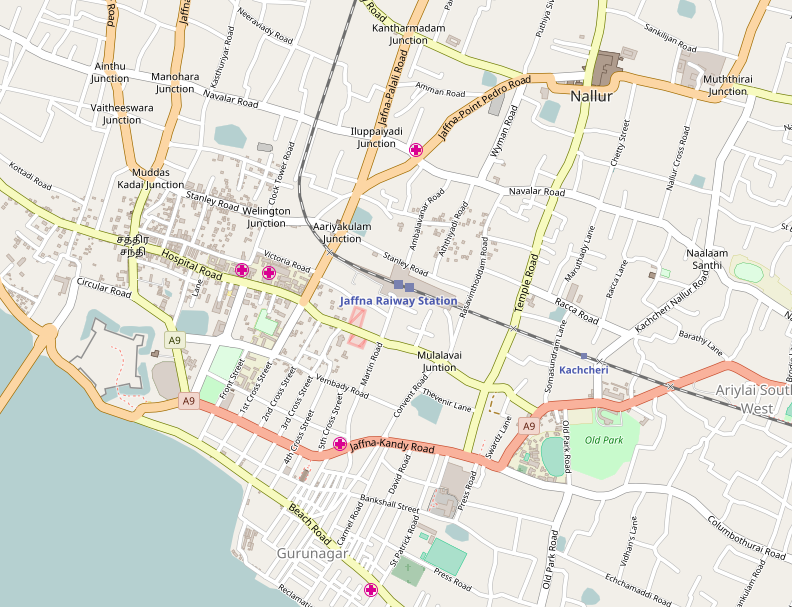
- Location in central Jaffna

Geography
- Location: Hospital Road, Jaffna, Jaffna District, Northern Province, Sri Lanka
- Coordinates: 9°39′57.50″N 80°00′52.50″E

Organisation
- Care system: Public
- Type: Teaching
- Affiliated university: University of Jaffna

Services
- Emergency department: Yes
- Beds: 1,228

Links
- Website: thjaffna.lk
- Lists: Hospitals in Sri Lanka

Jaffna Teaching Hospital is a government hospital in Jaffna, Sri Lanka. It is the leading hospital in the Northern Province and the only hospital in the province controlled by the central government in Colombo. The hospital is the only teaching hospital in the Northern Province. The hospital is the main clinical teaching facility for the University of Jaffna's Faculty of Medicine. As of 2010 it had 1,228 beds.

As well as general medical and surgical care the hospital provides a wide variety of healthcare services including cardiology, diabetic, dentistry, dermatology, family planning, gynaecology, neurology, obstetrics (ante-natal), oncology, ophthalmology, orthopaedics, otolaryngology (ENT), paediatrics and psychiatry. The hospital also has an emergency department, an intensive care unit, a premature baby unit, a primary health care unit, a pathological laboratory and a blood bank service.

In 2010 the hospital had 111,129 in-patient admissions, 268,922 out-patient visits and 476,616 clinic visits.

== See also ==
- Jaffna hospital massacre
