= Palaly Cantonment =

Coordinates: 9°48′N 80°05′E

- Palaly, Northern Province

Site information
- Type: Military Base
- Controlled by: Sri Lanka Armed Forces

Site history
- In use: 19?? – present
- Battles/wars: Operation Riviresa

Palaly Cantonment is a Sri Lanka Army cantonment located in Palaly, Northern Province of Sri Lanka, and the largest on the Jaffna Peninsula. The base houses the Security Forces Headquarters - Jaffna and is near the naval base SLNS Uttara at Kankasanturai and air base SLAF Palaly. The Sri Lanka Army Medical Corps maintains a base hospital in the cantonment and hosts the 3rd Regiment of the Sri Lanka Signals Corps as well.
