= Depinder Singh =

Indian Army lieutenant general (1930–2026)

Lieutenant general Depinder Singh PVSM, VSM
- Born: 1930; Punjab Province, British India
- Died: 28 April 2026 (aged 96); Panchkula, Haryana, India
- Military career
- Allegiance: India
- Branch: Indian Army
- Rank: Lieutenant general
- Commands: Overall commander of IPKF in Sri Lanka from July 1987 to March 1990
- Awards: Param Vishisht Seva Medal; Vishisht Seva Medal

Lieutenant general Depinder Singh, PVSM, VSM (1930 – 28 April 2026) was the overall commander of the IPKF in Sri Lanka from July 1987 to March 1990, He was the military assistant to Sam Manekshaw from 1969 to 1973 during the Indo-Pakistani War of 1971. Singh died on 28 April 2026, at the age of 96.

== Books ==
Singh wrote several books on his experience in the Indian army:

- The IPKF in Sri Lanka
- Field Marshal Sam Manekshaw, M.C. : Soldiering with Dignity

== Awards ==
Singh was conferred with the prestigious Param Vishisht Seva Medal and Vishisht Seva Medal.

Param Vishisht Seva Medal	Vishisht Seva Medal
