= Harkirat Singh (general) =

Indian military officer

Harkirat Singh is a former major general in the Indian Army. As the general officer commanding 54th Infantry Division, Singh served as the first commander of the Indian Peace Keeping Force during its deployment in Sri Lanka in 1987.
