= Thileepan =

Sri Lankan rebel (1963–1987)

Thiyaka Theepam Lt. Colonel Thileepan
- திலீபன்
- Born: R. Parthipan; 29 November 1963; Urelu, Jaffna, Sri Lanka
- Died: 26 September 1987 (aged 23); Nallur, Jaffna, Sri Lanka
- Other name: Amirthalingam Thileepan
- Years active: 1983 –1987
- Organization: Liberation Tigers of Tamil Eelam

Rasaiah Parthipan (Tamil: இராசையா பார்த்திபன்; 29 November 1963 – 26 September 1987; commonly known by the nom de guerre Thileepan) was a Tamil Eelam revolutionary and member of the Liberation Tigers of Tamil Eelam (LTTE), a separatist Tamil militant organisation in Sri Lanka. He died while on hunger strike.

== Early life and family ==
Parthipan was born on 29 November 1963. (Note: Another source gives Parthipan's date of birth as 27 November 1963 whilst another gives his year of birth as 1962.) He was from Urelu near Urumpirai in northern Ceylon. His father was a Tamil teacher and he had three older brothers. His mother died when Parthipan was three months old. After his father died of diabetes he was brought up by his brothers. He was educated at Jaffna Hindu College. After school he enrolled in the University of Jaffna.

== LTTE ==
Parthipan joined the militant Liberation Tigers of Tamil Eelam (LTTE) prior to the 1983 Black July anti-Tamil riots. He was given the nom de guerre Thileepan. Injured in the stomach in May 1987 during the Vadamarachchi Operation (Operation Liberation), he became the LTTE's political leader for Jaffna Peninsula.

As hostilities increased in northern Sri Lanka, the LTTE handed over a letter to the Indian High Commissioner on 13 September 1987 making five demands: the release of all political prisoners held under the Prevention of Terrorism Act and emergency regulations; cessation of Sinhalese colonisation of Tamil areas under the guise of "rehabilitation"; cessation of all "rehabilitation" activities until the establishment of the Interim Administrative Council; cessation of construction of police stations in the Northern and Eastern provinces; and the disarmament of Home Guards and withdrawal of the army/police from schools and colleges. (Note: Sri Lankan sources falsely claim that Thileepan's hunger strike was a protest against the presence of the Indian Peace Keeping Force in Sri Lanka.) The demands were aimed at the Indian rather than the Sri Lankan government because the LTTE believed that Indians could force the Sri Lankans to comply. The LTTE gave the Indians 24 hours to respond but no response, or even an acknowledgement, was received.

== Hunger strike ==
Determined to make the Indians meet the demands, Thileepan began a hunger strike on 15 September 1987 in front of Nallur Kandaswamy Temple. Thileepan gave speeches which were broadcast on Nidharshanam, the LTTE's TV stations. People from all over Jaffna peninsula came to observe and participate in the hunger strike. On 22 September 1987 Indian High Commissioner J. N. Dixit arrived at Palaly Airport and was met by LTTE leader V. Prabhakaran who wanted Dixit to go and see Thileepan. Dixit wanted a written guarantee from Prabhakaran that Thileepan would end his hunger strike if Dixit met with him but Prabhakaran couldn't give the guarantee. As his condition deteriorated, Thileepan stopped giving speeches. After refusing food or water for 12 days, Thileepan died on 26 September 1987. After a "martyr's funeral" in Jaffna, Thileepan's body was handed over to the University of Jaffna's medical faculty.

== Aftermath ==
LTTE leader Prabhakaran accused India of betraying the Tamils after vowing to protect them. Thileepan's death resulted in large anti-government and anti-Indian protests in northern Sri Lanka.

== Statues ==
A statue of Thileepan was built behind Nallur Kandaswamy Temple in 1988. After the Sri Lankan military re-captured the Valikamam region in 1996 they destroyed the statue. The statue was re-built in 2003 during the Norwegian mediated Cease Fire Agreement. After war resumed, Thileepan's photograph and decorative lamps at the statue were damaged by the army on 26 October 2006. Thileepan's statue was attacked and destroyed by armed men on 18 November 2007. The remnants of Thileepan's memorial, the pillar, was destroyed by the army on 21 March 2010. A temporary statue for Thileepan was erected for the remembrance celebrations with approval from Jaffna Municipal Council. After remembrance activities concluded the Sri Lankan Police confiscated the statue from its site in September 2026 before the organizers could remove it. The statue was handed over to the Jaffna court but has not been claimed by any party
