= Indian Peace Keeping Force =

Military unit in the Sri Lankan Civil War

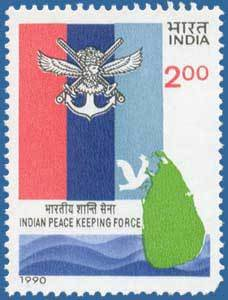
- Active: July 1987 – March 1990
- Country: Sri Lanka
- Allegiance: India
- Branch: Indian Army; Indian Navy; Indian Air Force
- Role: Peacekeeping; Counterinsurgency; Special operations
- Size: 100,000 (peak)
- Engagements: Operation Pawan; Operation Viraat; Operation Trishul; Operation Checkmate
- Decorations: One Param Vir Chakra; Six Maha Vir Chakras

Commanders
- Notable commanders: Lieutenant General Depinder Singh; Major General Harkirat Singh (General Officer Commanding); Major General AM Malik; Lieutenant General S.C. Sardeshpande; Lieutenant General A.S. Kalkat Cap.Shivkaran Alok Dubey(M.VrC); Gp.Capt. M.P Premi VrC, VM, IAF

The Indian Peace Keeping Force (IPKF) was the Indian military contingent performing a peacekeeping operation in Sri Lanka between 1987 and 1990. It was formed under the mandate of the 1987 Indo-Sri Lankan Accord that aimed to end the Sri Lankan Civil War between Sri Lankan Tamil militant groups such as the Liberation Tigers of Tamil Eelam (LTTE) and the Sri Lankan military.

The main task of the IPKF was to disarm the different militant groups, not just the LTTE. It was to be quickly followed by the formation of an Interim Administrative Council. These were the tasks as per the terms of the Indo-Sri Lankan Accord, signed at the behest of Indian Prime Minister Rajiv Gandhi. Given the escalation of the conflict in Sri Lanka, and with the pouring of refugees into India, Rajiv Gandhi took the decisive step to push this accord through. The IPKF was inducted into Sri Lanka on the request of Sri Lankan President J. R. Jayewardene under the terms of the Indo-Sri Lanka Accord.

The force was initially not expected to be involved in any significant combat by the Indian High Command. However, within a few months, the IPKF became embroiled in battle with the LTTE to enforce peace. The war erupted following the death of 17 LTTE prisoners, including two areas commanders in the custody of the Sri Lankan Army, which the LTTE blamed the IPKF for allowing to happen. Soon, these differences led to the LTTE attacking the Sinhalese, at which point the IPKF decided to disarm the LTTE militants, by force if required. In the two years it was in northern Sri Lanka, the IPKF launched a number of combat operations aimed at destroying the LTTE-led insurgency. It soon escalated into repeated skirmishes between the IPKF and LTTE. Numerous civilian massacres and rapes were committed by the IPKF during the conflict, with over 10,000 Tamils killed or disappeared during this period. Numerous soldiers of IPKF were killed by LTTE.

The IPKF began withdrawing from Sri Lanka in 1989, on the orders of the newly elected Sri Lankan President Ranasinghe Premadasa and following the election of the V. P. Singh government in India. The last IPKF contingents left Sri Lanka in March 1990.

India's battle in Sri Lanka is often called 'India's Vietnam' by international media, by way of comparison to American military involvement in the Vietnam War.

== Background ==
Sri Lanka, from the early 1980s, was facing increasingly violent ethnic strife in the Sri Lankan Civil War. The origins of the Sri Lankan Civil War can be traced to the independence of Sri Lanka in 1948, after the end of British rule. At the time, a Sinhalese majority government was instituted. This government, which included the Tamil Congress, passed legislation deemed discriminatory by some against the Tamil minority in Sri Lanka.

In the 1970s, two major Tamil parties, the Tamil Congress and a split, the Federal Party united to form the Tamil United Liberation Front (TULF), a separatist Tamil nationalist group that agitated for a separate state of Tamil Eelam in north and eastern Sri Lanka that would grant the Tamils greater autonomy within the federal structure.

However, the Sixth Amendment to the Constitution of Sri Lanka, enacted in August 1983, classified all separatist movements as unconstitutional, Outside the TULF, Tamil factions advocating more militant courses of action soon emerged, and the ethnic divisions eventually led to violent civil war.

=== Indian involvement and intervention ===
Initially, under Indira Gandhi the Indian Government sympathized with the Tamil insurrection in Sri Lanka because of the strong support for the Tamil cause within the Indian state of Tamil Nadu. Emboldened by this support, supporters in Tamil Nadu provided a sanctuary for the separatists and helped the LTTE smuggle arms and ammunition into Sri Lanka, making them the strongest force on the island. In fact in 1982, the LTTE supremo Prabhakran was arrested by the police in Tamil Nadu, for a shoot-out with his rival Uma Maheswaran, in the middle of the city. Both of them were arrested and later released by the police. This activity was left unchecked as India's regional and domestic interests wanted to limit foreign intervention on what was deemed as an ethnic issue between the Tamils and the Sinhalese. To this end, the Indira Gandhi government sought to make it clear to Sri Lankan president Junius Richard Jayewardene that armed intervention in support of the Tamil movement was an option India would consider if diplomatic solutions should fail.

The first round of civil violence flared in 1983 when the killing of 13 soldiers of the Sri Lanka Army, sparked anti-Tamil pogroms—the Black July riots—in which approximately 3000 Tamils were killed. The riots only aided in the deterioration of the ethnic relations. Militant factions, including the LTTE, at this time recruited in large numbers and continued building on popular Tamil dissent and stepped up the guerrilla war. By May 1985, the guerrillas were strong enough to launch an attack on Anuradhapura, attacking the Bodhi Tree shrine–a sacred site for Buddhist Sinhalese–followed by a rampage through the town. At least 150 civilians died in the hour-long attack.

Rajiv Gandhi's government attempted to re-establish friendly relations with the various factions in Sri Lanka while maintaining diplomatic efforts to find a solution to the conflict as well as limiting overt aid to the Tamil militants.

The Sri Lankan government, deducing a decline in support for the Tamil rebels from India, began rearming itself extensively for its anti-insurgent role with support from Pakistan, Israel, Singapore, and South Africa. In 1986, the campaign against the insurgency was stepped up. In 1987, retaliating against an increasingly bloody insurgent movement, the Vadamarachchi Operation (Operation Liberation) was launched against LTTE strongholds in Jaffna Peninsula. The operation involved nearly 10,000 troops, supported by helicopter gunships as well as ground-attack aircraft. In June 1987, the Sri Lankan Army laid siege on the town of Jaffna. This resulted in large-scale civilian casualties and created a condition of humanitarian crisis. India, which had a substantial Tamil population in South India faced the prospect of a Tamil backlash at home, called on the Sri Lankan government to halt the offensive in an attempt to negotiate a political settlement. However, the Indian efforts were unheeded. Added to this, in the growing involvement of Pakistani advisers, it was necessary for Indian interest to mount a show of force. Failing to negotiate an end to the crisis with Sri Lanka, India announced on 2 June 1987 that it wound send a convoy of unarmed ships to northern Sri Lanka to provide humanitarian assistance but this was intercepted by the Sri Lankan Navy and forced to turned back.

Following the failure of the naval mission the decision was made by the Indian government to mount an airdrop of relief supplies in aid of the beleaguered civilians over the besieged city of Jaffna. On 4 June 1987, in a bid to provide relief, the Indian Air Force mounted Operation Poomalai. Five Antonov An-32s under fighter cover flew over Jaffna to airdrop 25 tons of supplies, all the time keeping well within the range of Sri Lankan radar coverage. At the same time the Sri Lankan Ambassador to New Delhi, Bernard Tilakaratna, was summoned to the Foreign Office to be informed by the Minister of State, External Affairs, K. Natwar Singh, of the ongoing operation and also indicated that the operation was expected not to be hindered by the Sri Lankan Air Force. The ultimate aim of the operation was both to demonstrate the seriousness of the domestic Tamil concern for the civilian Tamil population and reaffirming the Indian option of active intervention to the Sri Lankan government.

=== Indo-Sri Lanka Accord ===
Following Operation Poomalai, faced with the possibility of an active Indian intervention and lacking any possible ally, the President, J. R. Jayewardene, offered to hold talks with the Rajiv Gandhi government on future moves. The siege of Jaffna was soon lifted, followed by a round of negotiations that led to the signing of the Indo-Sri Lankan Accord on 29 July 1987 that brought a temporary truce. Crucially however, the negotiations did not include the LTTE as a party to the talks.

The signing of the Indo-Sri Lankan Accord on 29 July 1987 brought a temporary truce to the Sri Lankan Civil War. Under the terms of the agreement, Colombo agreed to a devolution of power to the provinces, the Sri Lankan troops were withdrawn to their barracks in the north, the Tamil rebels were to disarm.

== Mandate ==
Amongst the provisions undersigned by the Indo-Sri Lanka Accord was the commitment of Indian military assistance should this be requested for by the Sri Lankan Government, as well as the provision of an Indian Peace Keeping Force that would "guarantee and enforce the cessation of hostilities". It was on these grounds, and on the request of President J. R. Jayewardene, that Indian troops were inducted to Northern Sri Lanka. J N Dixit, the then Indian ambassador to Colombo, in an interview to rediff.com in 2000 described that ostensibly, Jayawardene's decision to request Indian assistance came in the face of increasing civil riots and violence within the southern Sinhalese majority areas, including the capital Colombo that were initiated by the Janatha Vimukthi Peramuna and the Sri Lanka Freedom Party that necessitated the withdrawal of the Sri Lankan Army from the Tamil areas of northern Sri Lanka to maintain order.

== Order of battle ==
Originally a reinforced division with small naval and air elements, the IPKF at its peak deployed four divisions and nearly 80,000 men with one mountain (4th) and three Infantry Divisions (36th, 54th, 57th) as well as supporting arms and services. At the peak of its operational deployment, IPKF operations also included a large Indian Paramilitary Force and Indian Special Forces elements. Indeed, Sri Lanka was first theatre of active operation for the Indian Navy Commandos. The main deployment of the IPKF was in northern and eastern Sri Lanka. Upon its withdrawal from Sri Lanka the IPKF was renamed the 21st Corps and was headquartered near Bhopal and became a quick reaction force for the Indian Army.

=== Indian Army ===
The first Indian Army troops to be deployed to Sri Lanka were a ten thousand strong force from the 54th Infantry Division commanded by Major General Harkirat Singh, which flew into Palali Airbase from 30 July onwards. This was followed later by the 36th Infantry Division.

By 1987, the IPKF consisted of:

- 54 Infantry Division
  - 10th Battalion, Parachute Regiment (Special Forces)
  - 65 Armoured Regiment, equipped with T-72 tanks.
  - 6th Battalion, Brigade of the Guards
  - 91 Infantry Brigade
    - 5th Battalion, Madras Regiment
    - 8th Battalion, Mahar Regiment
    - 1st Battalion, Maratha Light Infantry
  - 76 Infantry Brigade
    - 12th Battalion, Garhwal Rifles
    - 2nd Battalion, Maratha Light Infantry
    - 25th Battalion, Rajput Regiment
  - 47 Infantry Brigade
    - 11th Battalion, Madras Regiment
    - 5th Battalion, Maratha Light Infantry
    - 14th Battalion, Sikh Light Infantry
- 36 Infantry Division
  - 115 Infantry Brigade
    - 5th Battalion, 1 Gorkha Rifles
  - 72 Infantry Brigade
    - 4th Battalion, 5 Gorkha Rifles (Frontier Force).
    - 13th Battalion, Sikh Light Infantry
  - 41 Infantry Brigade
    - 5th Battalion, Rajputana Rifles
- 57 Infantry Division
- 4 Mountain Division
- Independent Units
  - 340 Independent Infantry Brigade (Amphibious)
    - 1 Jammu and Kashmir Light Infantry (later part of 57 Inf Div)
    - 26 Punjab
    - 25 Madras
    - 3 Punjab
  - 18 Infantry Brigade
    - 4th Battalion, Mahar Regiment
    - 12th Battalion, Grenadiers
  - 5th Battalion, Parachute Regiment
  - 1st Battalion, Parachute Regiment (Special forces)
  - 9th Battalion, Parachute Regiment (Special forces)
  - 13th Battalion, Brigade of the Guards
  - 4th Battalion, Assam Regiment
  - 15th Battalion Mechanised Infantry Regiment
  - 25th Battalion Mechanised Infantry Regiment
  - 17 Parachute Field Regiment
  - 831 Light Regiment
  - 3 Engineer Regiment
  - 110 Engineer Regiment
  - 511 Air Defence Missile Regiment

=== Indian Air Force ===
Soon after its intervention in Sri Lanka and especially after the confrontation with the LTTE, the IPKF received a substantial commitment from the Indian Air Force, mainly transport and helicopter squadrons under the command of Gp.Capt. M.P Premi, including:

- No. 33 Squadron- Antonov An-32s
- No 109 and No. 119 Helicopter Units – Mil Mi-8 helicopters.
- No. 125 HU – Mil Mi-24s.
- No. 664 AOP Squadron Chetak and Cheetah

=== Indian Navy ===
The Indian Navy regularly rotated naval vessels through Sri Lanka waters, mostly smaller vessels such as patrol boats.

- Indian Naval Air Arm
  - No. 321 Squadron of the Indian Navy – HAL Chetaks
  - No. 310 Squadron of the Indian Navy – Breguet Alizé
- MARCOS (also the Marine Commando Force or MCF) – Took part in Operation Pawan (Hindi, "wind") in 1987 and in the raid on an LTTE base at Gurunagar. MARCOS operators (including Lt Singh) boarded two Gemini rafts off the coast of Jaffna City and towed two wooden rafts of explosives into a channel leading to the city's Guru Nagar Jetty. Avoiding mines, eight men and two officers shifted to the wooden rafts and paddled to the jetty then fixed demolition charges to the jetty and LTTE speedboats. The commandos were detected but laid down suppressive fire and detonated the explosives before retreating to the Geminis without taking casualties. Two nights later, commandos swam back into the harbour amidst heavy patrolling by the LTTE to destroy the remaining speedboats. They were again detected and sustained minor injuries. These actions helped recapture Trincomalee and Jaffna harbours from the LTTE. For leading these actions, the 30-year-old Lieutenant Arvind Singh became the youngest officer to receive the Maha Vir Chakra.

=== Indian paramilitary forces ===
- Central Reserve Police Force
- Indian Coast Guard

== Analysis ==
=== Casualties ===
In December 1999, Defence Minister George Fernandes disclosed the IPKF had suffered 1,165 personnel killed in action with 3,009 others wounded. The LTTE casualties are not known.

=== Intelligence failures ===
The Indian intelligence agencies failed to consistently provide accurate information to Indian forces. One example is the Jaffna football ground massacre. The LTTE's disinformation machinery leaked fake information to the Indian army that the LTTE leader Velupillai Prabhakaran was hiding in a building near the Jaffna university football ground. A major operational plan was chalked out by the Indian generals to capture him alive. The plan involved airdropping commandos on the ground, while tank formations would move to surround the area, to prevent anyone from the stadium and its surrounding buildings to escape.

However, when the plan was executed, the Indian troops came under heavy attack from hidden LTTE sharpshooters. the tanks moving on the ground were ensnared by anti-tank mines placed by the LTTE militants. This resulted in heavy losses for the Indian side. According to later accounts, the LTTE leader, Prabhakaran was not in the area at the time of the operation.

The IPKF complained that accurate maps of the operational theaters were not made available to them by the various intelligence agencies.

There was also a case where an agent of Research and Analysis Wing (RAW) was killed in an ambush set up by the IPKF. He had been acting on orders to carry out back channel diplomacy and peace talks with the LTTE.

== Impact ==
The IPKF mission while having gained tactical successes, did not succeed in its intended goals. The primary impact of the IPKF, has been that it shaped India's counterinsurgency techniques and military doctrine. The political fallout, the IPKF casualties, as well as the deterioration of international relations has shaped India's foreign policy towards the Sri Lankan conflict.

=== Assassination of Rajiv Gandhi ===
The decision to send the IPKF in Sri Lanka was taken by then Prime Minister of India, Rajiv Gandhi, who held office until 1989. Rajiv Gandhi was assassinated at a rally at Sriperumbudur on 21 May 1991, while he was campaigning for re-election during the 1991 Indian general election, by a LTTE suicide bomber named Dhanu.

=== India's foreign policy ===
The IPKF intervention in Sri Lanka is raised at times in Indian political discourse whenever the situation in Sri Lanka shows signs of deterioration or, more broadly, when other foreign nations, ought to have a role in promoting peace on the island nation. India has never been directly involved in the peace talks between the LTTE and Sri Lanka but has supported Norway's efforts. As a result, relations between India and Sri Lanka became extremely sour. No defence pact has been signed between India and Sri Lanka even though India reaffirmed its strong defence cooperation with Sri Lanka.

== War crimes ==
The IPKF role in the Sri Lankan conflict was criticised in both Sri Lanka and India. It perpetrated a number of human rights violations, including rapes and massacres of civilians. Several neutral organisations pointed out that the Indian Army acted with scant regard for civilian safety and violated human rights. This led to considerable outcry and public resentment within Sri Lanka as well as India, especially in Tamil Nadu, where the IPKF was viewed as an invading and oppressing force.

Indian forces indulged in a number of civilian massacres, involuntary disappearances and rapes during their time in the Northeastern province of Sri Lanka. These include complicity in the incidents such as Valvettithurai massacre in which on 2, 3, and 4 August 1989 over 50 Tamils were massacred by the Indian Peace Keeping Force in Valvettithurai, Jaffna. In addition to the killings over 100 homes, shops and other property were also burnt and destroyed.

Another notable incident was the Jaffna teaching hospital massacre on 22 October 1987. Following a confrontation with Tamil militants near the hospital, IPKF forces quickly entered the hospital premises and massacred over 70 civilians. These civilians included patients, two doctors, three nurses and a paediatric consultant who were all in uniform. The hospital never completely recovered after this massacre.

The IPKF was also accused of complicity in murder of Sinhalese civilians. The then Sri Lankan government accused the Madras Regiment posted in the Trincomalee district of complicity, although the Indian officials denied responsibility, they withdrew the Madras Regiment from Trincomalee district.

=== Sexual violence ===
From October 1987, the IPKF commenced war on the LTTE in order to disarm them. During this conflict, the IPKF raped numerous Tamil women. One IPKF official excused these rapes by stating the following:

"I agree that rape is a heinous crime. But my dear, all wars have them. There are psychological reasons for them such as battle fatigue."

==== 1987 ====
- On 6 November 1987, at about 7:30am the IPKF committed a massacre of Tamil civilians in Jaffna to avenge the loss of their comrades. One witness saw both his two daughters being stripped naked below the waist by Hindi speaking soldiers. The girls were both crying and begging for mercy. The soldiers then separated their legs and shot them through their genitals, keeping the rifle barrel between the thighs. The witness closed his eyes and played dead during the shooting. He also heard the two daughters of another man also being shot through the genitals. 10 Tamil civilians were killed in total during this massacre, including infants.
- On 12 November 1987, at about 8am in Jaffna, three IPKF soldiers gang raped a Tamil mother in her mid 30s in her own home. Her husband was working abroad at the time. They also stole her gold jewellery. The victim reported suffering from nightmares following the attack and was haunted by the soldiers' faces and voices. She could still remember their beady eyes. She visited a psychiatrist who gave her drugs to quieten her down.
- The IPKF also raped a 13 year old Tamil girl from a middle-class family in a house that had once been a Tiger camp. The family and child fled to Colombo after the rape.
- On 16 November 1987, two IPKF soldiers raped a young Tamil girl in her home, after separating her from her parents. She bled after the rape and then jumped into the family well in desperation.
- On 18 November 1987, between 2-3pm, two IPKF soldiers raped a widow (55) and a 22-year-old woman in a poor Catholic area of Jaffna. The younger girl was able to free herself after being raped, and ran down the road screaming. She cried out "they have spoilt me".
- On 17 December 1987, Sepoy Karnail Singh of 14 Sikh light infantry of the IPKF faced dismissal and one year's imprisonment for raping a Tamil woman from the village of Idaikkurichy. Similar punishment was given to A. Mani, the barber of 93 Field Regiment for raping an unmarried woman near Kodikamam on 24 December 1987.
- On 19 December 1987, at 11:30am, two Tamil women were raped in Jaffna by the IPKF. The younger woman was aged 25. The two women were taken into two separate rooms and raped. The IPKF soldiers left once the neighbours arrived en masse to the house, alerted by the dogs barking fiercely.
- On 23 December 1987, an educated 18 year old Tamil virgin from a poor labourer family was gang raped by two IPKF soldiers in succession. The previous day the soldiers had come and stolen chickens from their garden.
- Naik Banwari Lal and rifleman Gugan Ram of 18 Garhwal Rifles faced dismissal and 6 months' imprisonment each for trying to rape married women at Kaithadi on 25 December 1987.
- In 1987, when Tamil journalist A. Lokeesan was six years old, he heard a Tamil woman screaming in a paddy field as she was being raped by IPKF soldiers.
- Karunaharen, a 16-year old Tamil boy was stopped along with his sister by IPKF soldiers. His sister was then taken into a house by the soldiers, where he heard her scream. He ran to the window and witnessed her being raped and then killed by the IPKF soldiers. He ran back to his home in terror. His parents later bought him a ticket to Canada, fearing for this safety. On his way to Canada, he was stopped at Seattle, taken off the plane and put in a detention centre with a criminal gang from Seattle. The gang members then beat and gang raped him. A sympathetic prison guard then handed him over to a Tamil lawyer living in Seattle.

==== 1988 ====
- On 25 January 1988, the body of a 30 year old Tamil woman was found dead in a well. She had committed suicide after being raped by IPKF soldiers who had visited her house. The postmortem found clear evidence of rape, with lacerations to her vagina and bruises on the labia.
- On 29 January 1988, at 12:10pm, a 22 year old Tamil student was raped by 4 IPKF soldiers behind the bushes, after they separated her from her semi-blind father near a temple in Jaffna.
- Havildar Badan Singh of the IPKF committed sodomy against 4 male activists of the LTTE during their detention at Jaffna fort in January–February 1988.
- On 27 May 1988, two IPKF soldiers, Latur Lal and Babu Lal of 12 Grenadiers, were facing a year's imprisonment and dismissal from service for raping a married Tamil woman at Karaveddy during Operation Pawan.
- On 15 November 1988, 6 members of the IPKF raped 7 Tamil women in Jaffna. The victims of rape were Mrs. Sushila Veerasingam, Miss Manjulu Nadarajah, Miss Mala Asaipillai, Miss Rani Subramaniam, Miss Rajani Subramaniam, Miss Thayalini Sundaram and Miss Syamala Rajaratnam.
- Amnesty International reported an increasing number of allegations that IPKF personnel had raped Tamil women. Several dozen Tamil women have testified on oath that they were raped by IPKF personnel, for example in Kondavil East in the north and in Sathurkodanan and Morakkadanchenai villages in the east.

== War memorial ==
The Sri Lankan government had mooted the idea of a war memorial to those soldiers of the IPKF who lost their lives during the peacekeeping mission, in the early Nineties during President Premadasa's rule. The memorial was finally constructed in Sri Jayawardenapura Kotte on the outskirts of Colombo in 2008. The names of the 1200 soldiers who died are inscribed on black marble. The first official memorial service was held on 15 August 2010 when the Indian High Commissioner to Sri Lanka, Ashok Kantha, laid a wreath to honour the dead. The absence of a representative of the Sri Lankan government has been criticised by Indian ex-servicemen who had served in the conflict. Later in 2014, India constructed a war memorial at Bhopal to honour the IPKF.

A renovated memorial for IPKF soldiers in Palaly, Jaffna, has been declared open in June 2015. The names of 33 who died in the operations in the Northern Province during 1987–1990 have been inscribed on a wall at the memorial site.

== See also ==
- Foreign intervention in the Sri Lankan civil war
- Annai Poopathy
- Black July
- Hunger strike of LTC Thileepan
- India-Sri Lanka Accord
- Jaffna hospital massacre
- Jaffna University Helidrop
- Operation Pawan
- Operation Poomalai
- State terrorism in Sri Lanka
- Valvettiturai massacre (1989)
- Sri Lankan civil war topics
