= Jaffna hospital massacre =

Massacre in October 1987 during the Sri Lankan Civil War

- Part of Sri Lankan Civil War
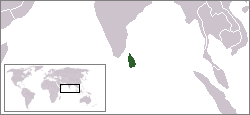
- Location of Sri Lanka
- Location: Jaffna, Sri Lanka
- Date: October 21–22, 1987 (+6 GMT)
- Target: Sri Lankan Tamil patients, nurses, doctors and staff of the hospital
- Attack type: Shooting, grenade explosion
- Weapons: Firearms, grenades
- Deaths: 60–70
- Injuries: 50+ (estimated)
- Perpetrator: Indian Peace Keeping Force soldiers deployed in Sri Lanka

The Jaffna hospital massacre occurred on October 21 and 22, 1987, during the Sri Lankan Civil War, when troops of the Indian Peace Keeping Force entered the premises of the Jaffna Teaching Hospital in Jaffna, Sri Lanka, an island nation in South Asia, and killed between 60 and 70 patients and staff. The rebel Liberation Tigers of Tamil Eelam, the government of Sri Lanka, and independent observers such as the University Teachers for Human Rights and others have called it a massacre of civilians.

However, the Indian Army maintains that the soldiers were fired upon and the Indian army officer in charge of the military operations, Lt. Gen. Depinder Singh, claimed that these civilians were killed in a crossfire between soldiers and rebels. Soldiers responsible for this massacre were not prosecuted by the Indian government.

== Background information ==
During the 1950s, around 50% of civil service jobs in Ceylon were held by the Tamil minority, who comprised approximately 23% of the population. This was enabled partly because of the availability of western-style education provided by American missionaries and others in the Tamil-dominant Jaffna Peninsula. The preponderance of Tamils over their proportionate share of the population was an issue for populist majority Sinhalese politicians, who came to political power by promising to elevate the Sinhalese people. The resultant discriminative measures such as the Sinhala Only Act and the policy of standardisation, as well as riots and pogroms that targeted the minority Sri Lankan Tamils, led to the formation of a number of rebel groups advocating independence for Sri Lankan Tamils. Following the 1983 Black July pogrom full-scale civil war began between the government and rebel groups.

In 1987 the governments of Sri Lanka and India entered into an agreement and invited the Indian Army to be used as peacekeepers. Eventually the Indian Peace Keeping Force (IPKF) came into conflict with one of the rebel groups, namely the Liberation Tigers of Tamil Eelam (LTTE). By October 1987 Indian forces were trying to wrest control of the Jaffna Peninsula from the LTTE.

== Attack ==
The Jaffna hospital, also known as the Jaffna Teaching Hospital and Jaffna General Hospital, is the premier healthcare providing institution within the densely populated Jaffna Peninsula, situated in the Northern Province of Sri Lanka. It had functioned throughout the period of civil war as a sanctuary that was out of bounds for combatants. After the deterioration of the relationship between the rebel LTTE and the IPKF, an attempt by the IPKF to capture Jaffna town was expected. Because of fears of a military operation by the Indian Army, some staff of the hospital had kept away from duty, but others had reported to work assuming that the Indian Army would be considerate because of assurances provided by the Indian Embassy in Colombo to a group of prominent Jaffna citizens that a major military action was not imminent. By October 21, 1987, which was Diwali, a high Hindu holiday, over 70 dead bodies had accumulated in the mortuary as a result of shelling and other military activities.

== Eyewitness accounts ==
One eyewitness recalled the following:

"The Indian Army came firing into the Radiology Block and fired indiscriminately at this whole mass of people huddled together. We saw patients dying. We lay there without moving a finger pretending to be dead. We were wondering all the time whether we would be burnt or shot when the bodies of the dead were collected."

Another eyewitness, Mr Sivagurunathan, recounted the following:

"I was in Ward 8, where my wife was, when they came in shooting at random into the hospital from behind.

Some employees ran in the direction of the X-ray room, and I followed them there with my wife. I was one of the first to reach it and went in with the rest. Soon the others ran into the room and the room got filled and we were pressed against the wall.

Then, the attackers, driving a group of people before them, arrived in front of the room. They pushed everybody inside. They threw grenades inside and started shooting. People were screaming and falling on each other."

== Timeline of events ==
=== October 21, 1987 ===
- 11h – The hospital environment came under cannon fire from the vicinity of Jaffna Dutch Fort and from overhead helicopters.
- 11h30 – A shell fell on the Outpatients Department (O.P.D) building.
- 13h – The chief consultant on duty was informed that Indian troops had been sighted at nearby Shanti Theatre Lane.
- 13h30 – A shell fell on Ward 8, killing seven persons. The chief consultant who went out with another doctor to survey the situation spotted some empty cartridges, suggesting that persons had been firing from inside the hospital premises.
- 14h – The chief consultant's attention was drawn to the presence of some armed LTTE fighters inside the hospital. The chief consultant went with Dr. Ganesharatnam and asked the group to leave the premises. The leader of the group agreed and they left.
- 14h5 – The chief consultant was informed that another group of LTTE men had come inside. Dr. Ganesharatnam requested that the chief consultant go with another doctor to speak to the LTTE group and ask them to leave. It is not clear if the LTTE men ever left the hospital.
- 14h, 16h – A few staff members left the hospital for lunch through the back door.
- 16h – Staff heard shooting for 15–20 minutes from the vicinity of the gasoline station on Hospital Road. No retaliatory fire from the hospital was heard.
- 16h20 and onward – According to an eyewitness, the IPKF entered the hospital grounds through the front gate, came up along the corridor and warned everybody inside the hospital. The IPKF fired into the Overseer's office and other offices. The eyewitness saw many of his fellow workers killed, including the overseer and an ambulance driver. The eyewitness also saw a soldier throw a grenade at a man, killing several people. According to another eyewitness, the IPKF came into the Radiology room, which was filled with people including the patients evacuated from Ward 8, and fired indiscriminately. Those who pretended to be dead by lying on the floor escaped the attack.
- Throughout the night a few bursts of fire and grenade explosions were heard.

=== October 22, 1987 ===
- 8h30 – Dr. Sivapathasundaram was seen walking out of the hospital with three nurses. They were walking with their hands up shouting, "We surrender, we are innocent doctors and nurses." Shots were fired; Dr. Sivapathasundaram was killed and the nurses injured.
- 11h – An Indian Army officer turned up at one of the wards and was confronted by a doctor. The doctor explained the situation to the officer and later, with help of the officer, she called out to her colleagues and those who were injured to come out with their hands up. About 10 staff members who were alive were escorted out. They found their colleague Dr. Ganesharatnam dead. Later in the day all the dead bodies in the hospital were collected and burned.

== Reactions ==
The Indian Army had maintained that it was fired upon from inside the hospital and people were caught in a crossfire. This was reiterated by Lt. Gen. Depinder Singh. The rebel LTTE and the government of Sri Lanka have maintained that it was an unprovoked massacre of civilians. The government of Sri Lanka in 2008 termed it a crime against humanity. A number of independent observers such as University Teachers for Human Rights, a Human Rights organization from Sri Lanka, and western observers such Mr. John Richardson and others maintain that it was a massacre of civilians.

== In popular culture ==
The massacre and other alleged atrocities of the war are covered in the award-winning 2002 film In the Name of Buddha directed by Rajesh Touchriver.
