= Dera Bhattian =

Village in Punjab, Pakistan

Dera Bhattian Chak No 9 RB ڈیرہ بھٹیاں چک نمبر 9 آربی
- Village
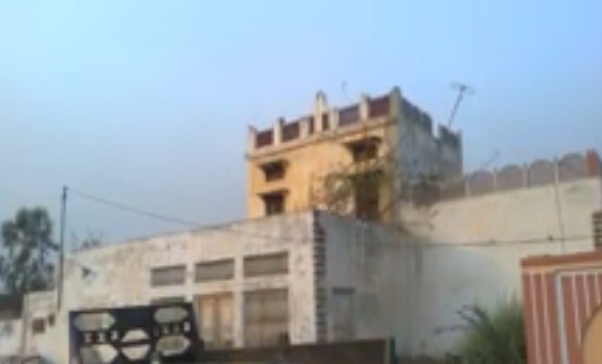
- Old Chobara Building, Main View of Village Dera Bhattian, Sheikhupura, Pakistan

- Flag
- Motto: ہووے بھٹی تے ہار نوں منے میں نہیں مندا
- Location of Dera Bhattian in Pakistan
- Coordinates: 31°46′06″N 73°37′14″E
- Region: (Punjab, Pakistan) Punjab (Pakistan)
- District: Sheikhupura District
- Tehsil: Safdarabad
- Union Council: Dhaban Kalan Chak No 13 RB
- Settled: Before 1900 BCE
- Founder: Choudhary Rahmat Khan Bhatti

Government
  - Type: Union Council
  - Choudhary (وڈکا): Choudhary Rahmat Khan Bhatti, Choudhary Nowsher Khan Bhatti, Shahadat Khan Bhatti, Falak Sher Bhatti, Ashiq Hussain Bhatti, Arif Hussain Bhatti
  - Village Head (چوہدری): Alam Sher Bhatti
- Elevation: 195 m (640 ft)

Population
  - Total: 100 - 130 Individuals approx.
- Time zone: UTC+5 (PST)
- Area code: 056
- Languages: Official Language : Urdu Native language : Punjabi (98.2%) Others (1.8%)

Dera Bhattian (Urdu: ڈیرہ بهٹياں) is a traditional rural village of Pakistani Punjab in Chak No 9 RB, Tehsil Safdarabad, Sheikhupura District of Pakistan. It lies in the rolling flat plains of northeast Punjab, at 195 metres (640 ft) above sea level. This village falls in National Assembly Constituency NA-122 (Sheikhupura-IV). In General Election 2018 Sardar Muhammad Irfan Dogar of Khas Kakar Gill, Tehsil & District Sheikhupura became MNA. Village is connected to major cities like Lahore, Sheikhupura, Islamabad and Peshawar through M2 Motorway via Khanqan Dogran interchange. Lahore Sargodha road is also available for local movement. Safdarabad railway station is 4 km away from village and used for rail journey towards Lahore, Faisalabad and Karachi.

== History ==
The village was founded prior to Pakistan's independence. It was initially resided by Sikhs and named as Dera Sahib Ditta on name of a Sikh religious figure. Locals renamed the village as Dera Bhattian or Kot Rahmat Khan on arrival of Choudhary Rahmat Khan Bhatti from Ameen Ka Chak, Jaranwala. Nearby villages are Mahtabah Chak 9RB, Neewan Pind and Qila Mir Zaman.

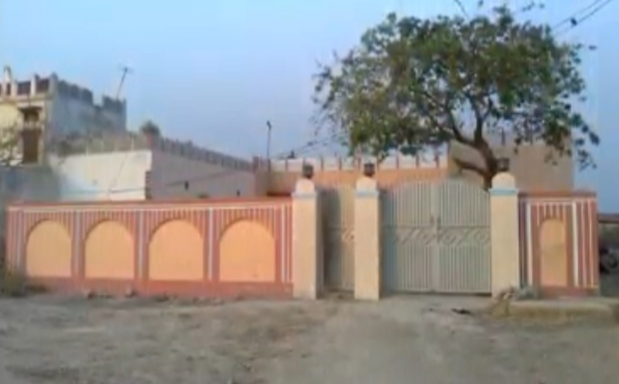
View of Village Dera Bhattian

== People ==
People in the village are living in houses made of bricks and concrete. These typically have three to five rooms which house extended families. By religion they are 100% Muslims.

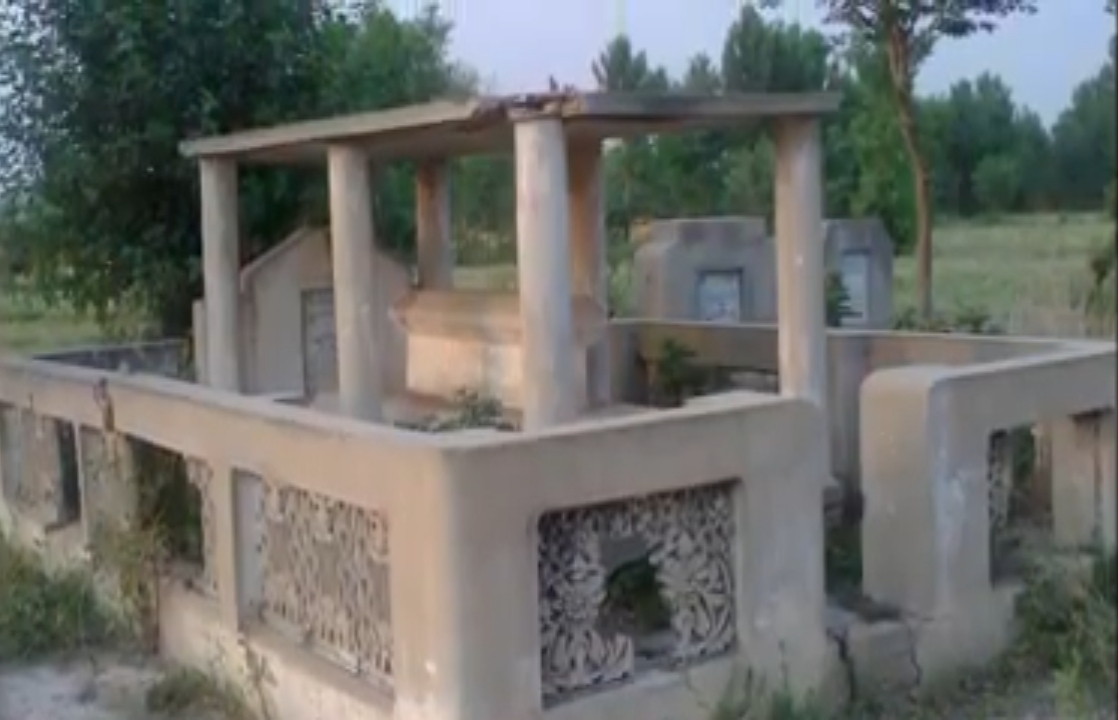
Dera Bhattian village in Sheikhupura, Pakistan. Tomb of Choudhary Rahmat Khan Bhatti

== Geology ==
Dera Bhattian is part of the alluvial plains between the Himalayan foothills and the central core of the Indian subcontinent. The alluvial deposits are typically over a thousand feet thick. The interfluves are believed to have been formed during the Late Pleistocene and feature river terraces.

== Television, Radio and Telecommunication ==
Pakistan Television Corporation (PTV) is the state-owned regulated television whose broadcast channels of PTV Home and PTV News are available to the village TV receivers. Radio Pakistan broadcasts government regulated medium waves radio which is providing information and entertainment of people.

Pakistan Telecommunication Authority (PTA) is the main provider of fixed line communication, mobile and broadband services to village. Mobile services by Mobilink, Telenor, Ufone and Zong are available in the village.

== Economy ==
The Rakh Branch canal passes near one side of the village, moving to Sangla Hill and is an irrigation source for agricultural land. Most of the residents are landlords, agriculturists and cattle farmers. They farm wheat, rice, sugarcane, vegetable, fodder and produce milk and dairy products. Few of them are employees of Civil Govt, Pakistan Army, Pakistan Airforce and Airports Security Force. Other are linked with public transportation, goods transport, foreign employment.

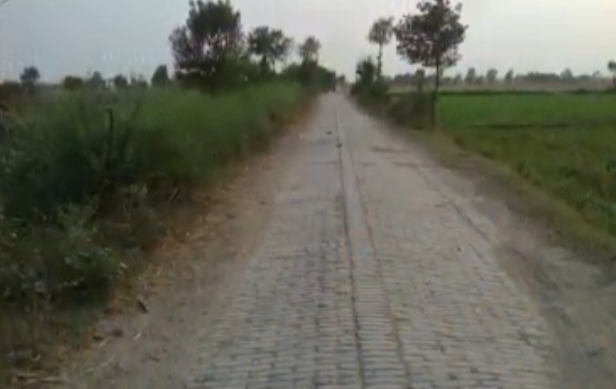
Agricultural land of Dera Bhattian

== Education ==
The Village has two Govt schools of primary education level; one each for boys and girls education. Literacy rate is 80%.

== Worship ==
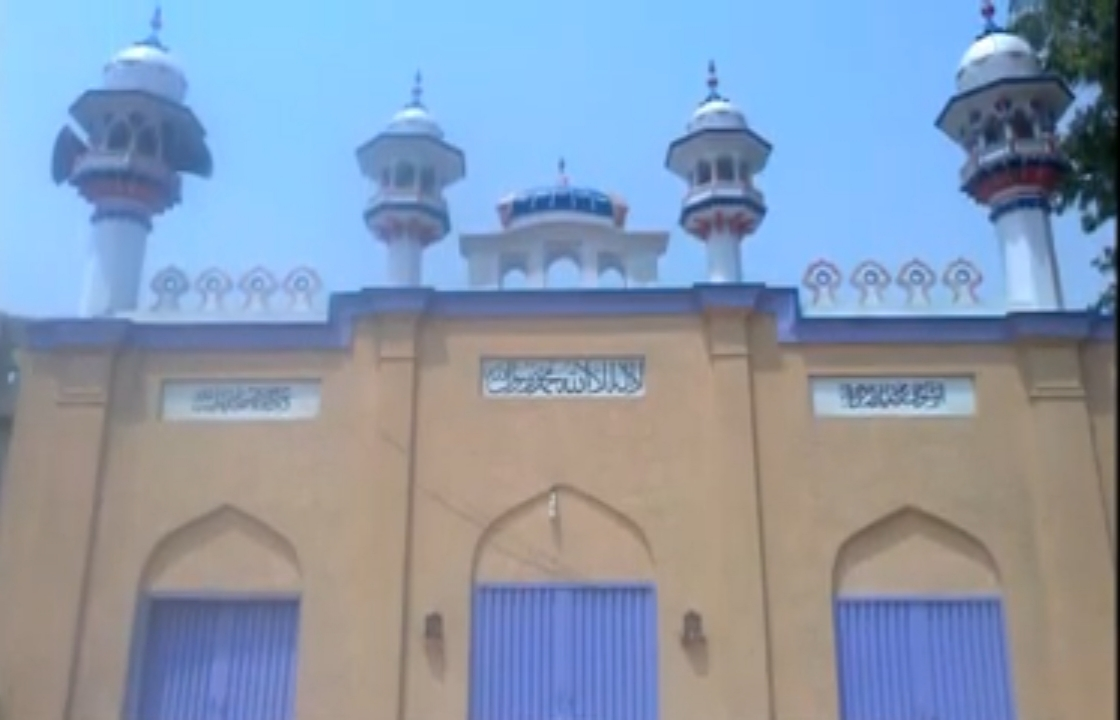
Main Mosque of Dera Bhattian

The Village has two mosques for Muslim prayers.
