= Bambawali-Ravi-Bedian Canal =

Canal in Pakistan

Bambanwala–Ravi–Bedian Canal
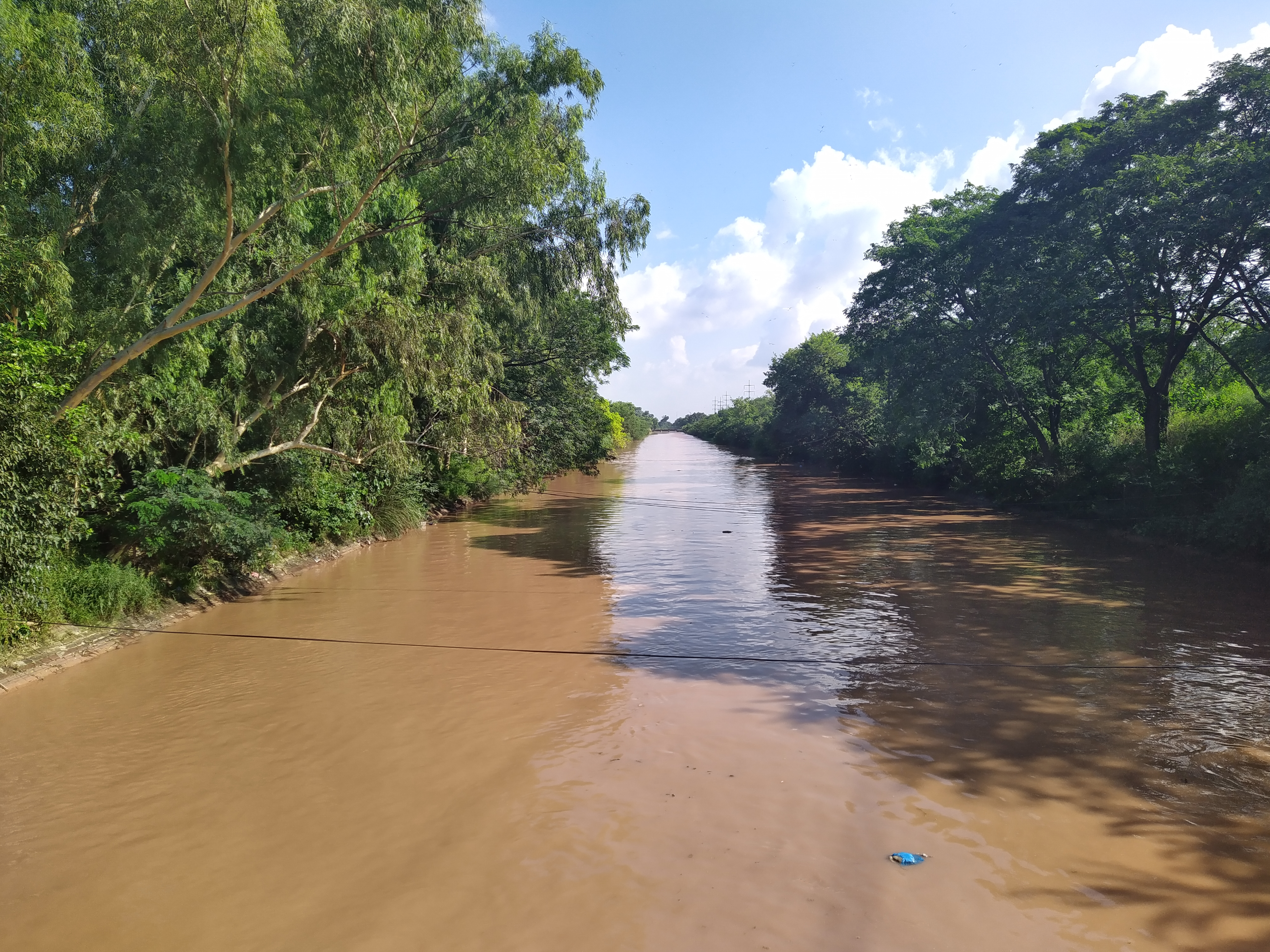
- BRB Canal near Lahore
- Interactive map of Bambanwala–Ravi–Bedian Canal
- Location: Punjab
- Country: Pakistan
- Coordinates: 31°32′46″N 74°43′30″E

Specifications
- Status: Operational
- Navigation authority: Punjab Irrigation Department

History
- Former names: Ichogil Canal
- Construction began: 1948

Geography
- Start point: Upper Chenab Canal near Bambanwala west of Daska
- End point: Sutlej River near Kanganpur

Bambanwala-Ravi-Bedian Canal (BRB Canal), also called Ichogil Canal (by Indian authors), is a manmade waterway in Pakistan that takes off from the Upper Chenab Canal near the Bambanwala village (to the west of Daska), runs southeast until reaching close to the India-Pakistan border and then runs south parallel to the border. It ends at the Sutlej near Kanganpur 100 km south of Lahore. It is the source of the Lahore Canal which runs westwards to the city of Lahore.

== History ==
The canal was built by the citizens of Lahore in 1948 in response to an appeal by the Chief Minister of Punjab Iftikhar Hussein to safeguard the city from a possible Indian invasion in the future. As a result, common Pakistani nationals dug the whole 8 km canal free of cost in a few days.

=== Indo-Pakistani War of 1965 ===
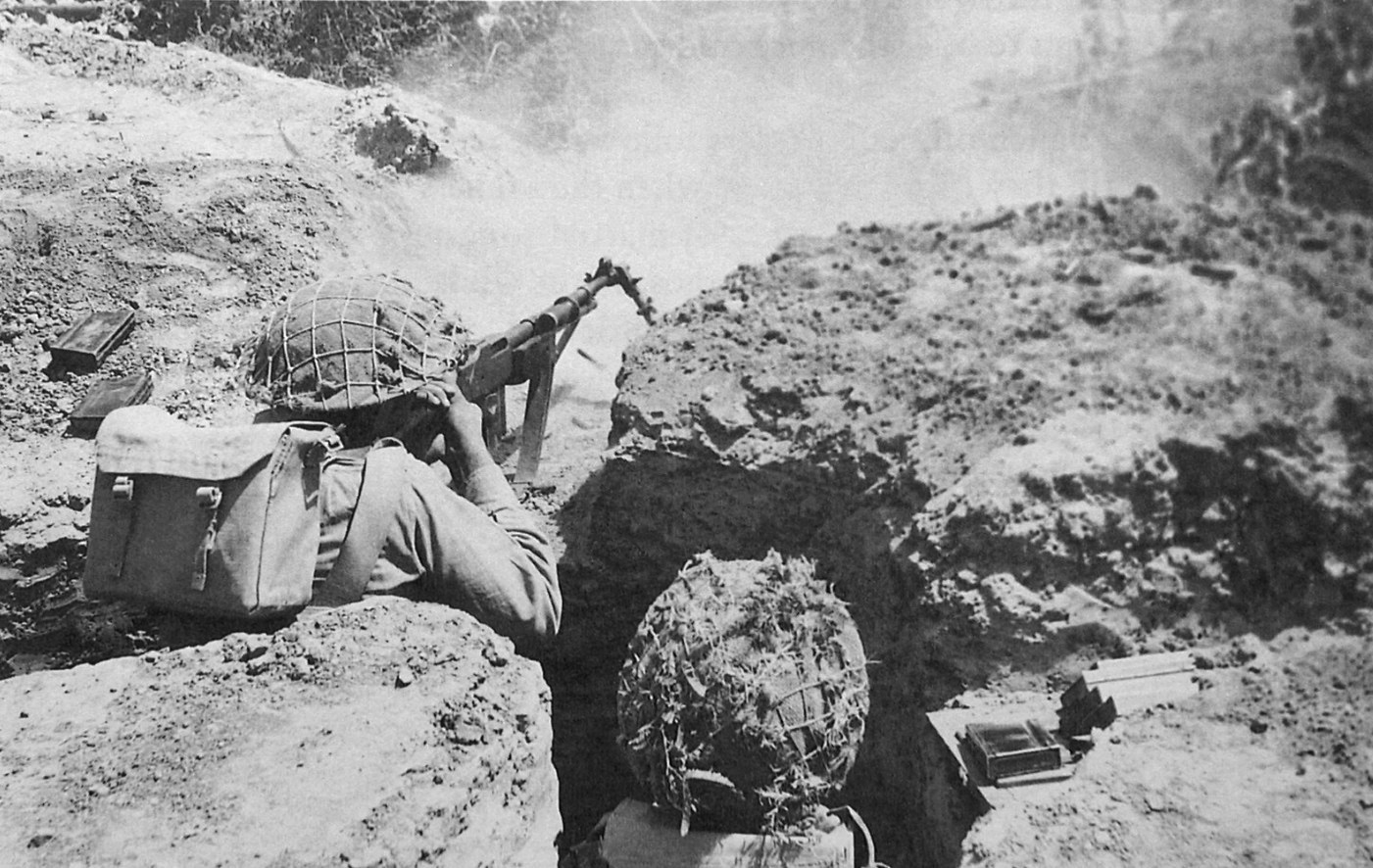
Pakistani Soldier engaging with Indian Army on BRB Canal during the Indian invasion

During the Indo-Pakistani War of 1965, the canal played a crucial role in defence of Lahore. The canal, due to its around 45 metre width and 5 metre depth, acted as the main defence line to major Pakistani cities. The western side of the canal, was lined with a network of fortified pillboxes, deep infantry bunkers and artillery positions. Moreover, it had a higher elevation than the eastern side, giving a clear view of enemy movements.

A single Indian battalion had been able to cross the canal on the very first day of the war, 6 September, but then retreated. Pakistani army was successful in delaying the Indian advance at Barki and Dograi, and blew up all except eight bridges crossing the canal in an effort to hold back the invading Indian forces until the ceasefire was announced. The Indian army failed in its objective to build a pass over the canal, however, it was able to capture the eastern Bund(embankment) of the canal, as well as towns east of the canal, Barki and Dograi, at Lahore sector. Hence, the canal never fell and acted as a successful defence line.

According to a military historian Agha Humayun Amin:

The BRBL proved the English Channel that saved Pakistan’s strategic position in the crucial Ravi-Sutlej Corridor. This man made obstacle severely restricted the Indian freedom of manoeuvre and nullified their relative superiority in infantry. The canal acted as the anvil vis-a-vis Pakistani artillery fire, tank fire and infantry small arms fire which played the role of hammer which crushed the Indians inflicting heavy casualties on them.

== See also ==
- Khanki Headworks
- Lower Chenab Canal
- Gogera Branch Canal
- Jhang Branch
- Marala–Ravi Link Canal
- Taunsa Barrage
- Indus River
- Rachna Doab
