= Sabour, Pakistan =

Village in Punjab, Pakistan

Sabour صبور
- Village
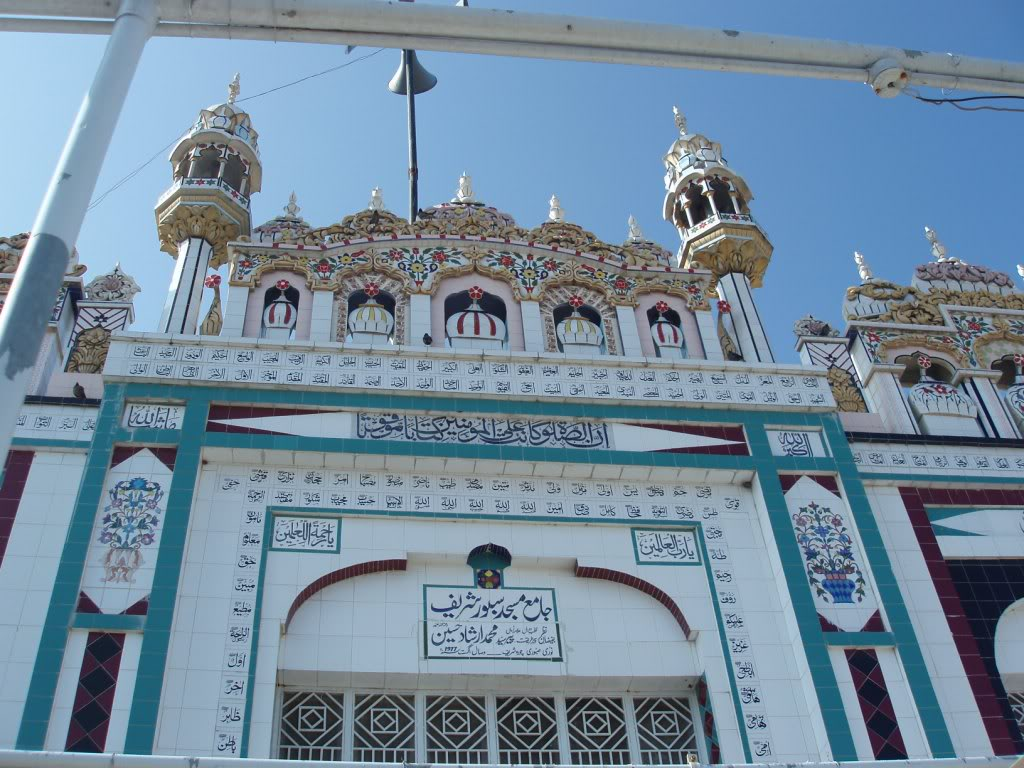
- Jamia Masjid Sabour
- Interactive map of Sabour
- Coordinates: 32°48′11″N 74°03′41″E
- Country: Pakistan
- Province: Punjab
- Division: Gujrat
- District: Gujrat
- Tehsil: Kharian
- Thana: Kakrali

Area
  - Total: 2.75 km^{2} (1.06 sq mi)
- Elevation: 275 m (902 ft)

Population (1998)
  - Total: 27,915
- Demonym: Sabourian
- Time zone: UTC+5 (PST)
- Calling code: 50931
- Website: http://sites.google.com/site/saboursite/ https://en.m.wikipedia.org/wiki/Sabour,Pakistan

Sabour (Urdu صبور) is a Union Council of Gujrat District, in the Punjab province of Pakistan.

== Geography ==
Sabour is located at 32°48'10.45"N 74° 3'44.45"E on Bhimber Road, 30 kilometres from Gujrat and 17 km from Bhimber. A road from Kharian to Bhimber also links Sabour with Rawalpindi. Samrala, Ladian (the village of Major Aziz Bhatti Shaheed), Rolia and Shampur are neighbouring villages. Administratively, Sabour is the head office of the Union Council Sabour and part of Kharian Tehsil.

Geographically Sabour is situated in a plain area, but there is a small hill in the middle of the village which is being used as Graveyard of the village it is called "Tibba". Most beautiful is the eastern side of the village where there flows a rainy stream called "Nala Bhandar". There is much greenery on the both banks of it. Youth enjoy swimming on rainy days along its banks. Bhimber Road bisects the village.

== History ==
Sabour is an ancient town. Documented records of Sabour exist of Sher Shah Suri's time.

== Trade and Economy ==
Historically, Sabour has always been reliant on employment in Military.Peoples from village served in World War I. one of brave men RIFLEMAN Muhammad Khan son of Hassu Khan 125th Napier's Rifles Regt. Date of death 19 May 1915 buried or commemorated at Neuve-Chapelle Indian Memorial Panel 14 France. Land holdings are generally small. Due to uneven land feature of Sabour irrigation through canals is not possible. Rain and sub surface water wells provide water for irrigation. Subsistence agriculture is practiced by some but increasingly reducing in size. People diversified their option more after independence from British Raj. Many people joined civilian government departments and industrial units across Pakistan. Karachi became the preferred city for employment for Sabourians during the 1960s and 1970s. Sabour was usually a low-income village in the early decades of Pakistan.

Economic conditions in Sabour improved significantly during the 1980s and 1990s, driven by labor migration to Gulf countries, particularly Saudi Arabia. Remittances from workers increased household purchasing power, stimulating local trade, commerce, and infrastructure development, including housing, healthcare, and educational facilities. This period of growth was followed by further migration to Europe and North America. Over the past decade, the local economy has experienced expansion in the dining and catering sector, establishing Sabour as a regional center for grilled food within Kharian Tehsil.

The people of Sabour run a cooperative charity organization in the village. The organisation launched its projects to provide clean water and sanitary services in the village. Generous donations of SABOUR diaspora in the world and around Pakistan support the organisation financially.

== Infrastructure ==
Roads from Gujrat and Kharian meet in Sabour. Electricity came in 1966 and fixed line telephone in 1995. There are two water turbines to supply fresh water to Sabour which is a project of WHO. There is no specific marketplace but there are many shops in Sabour, most of them are situated on both sides of the Gujrat Bhimber road. Streets are paved and sewage channels are open but lined.

== Schools ==
Sabour has had a primary school since 1905.

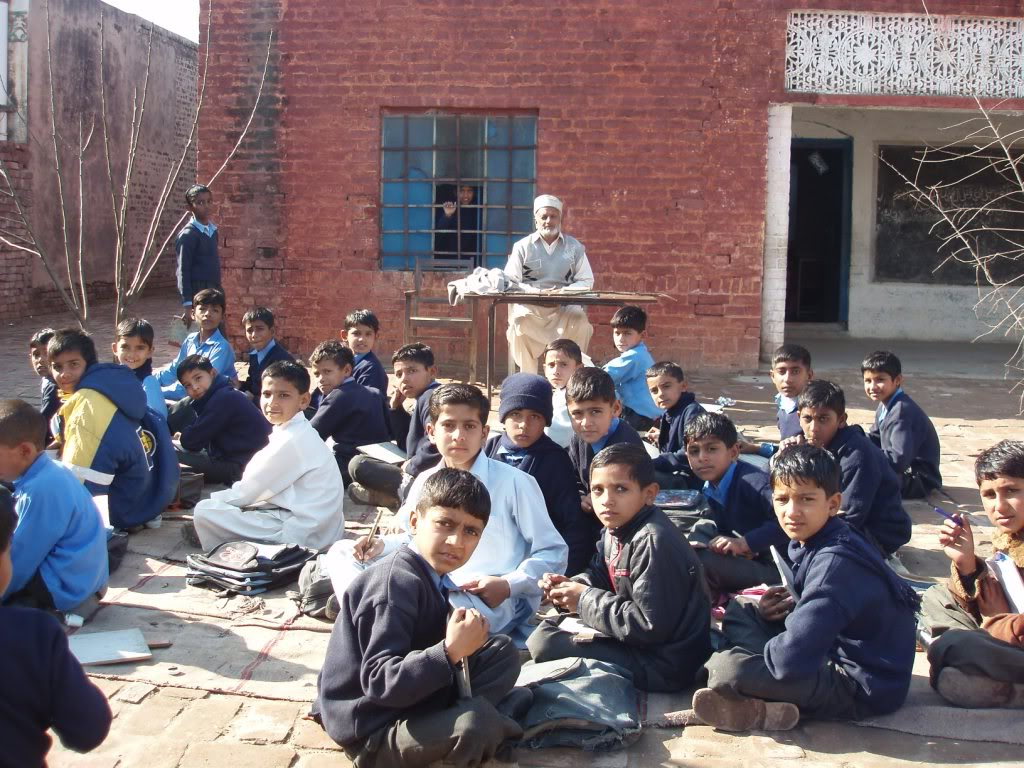
Boy's Primary School, Sabour

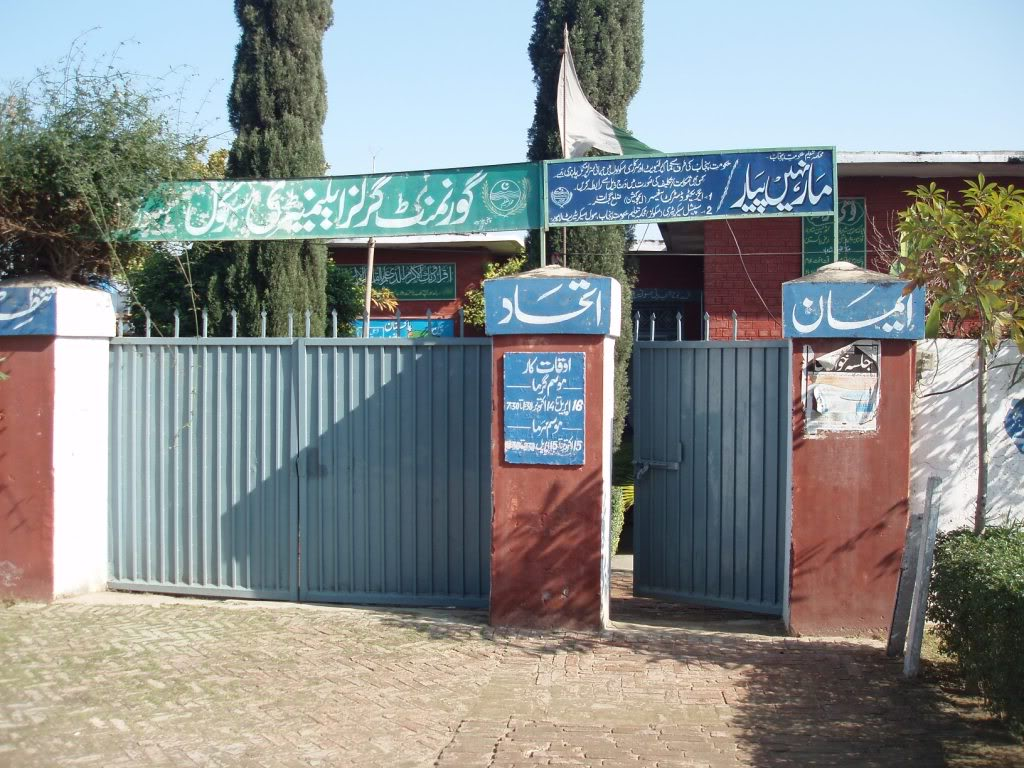
Girl's Elementary School, Sabour

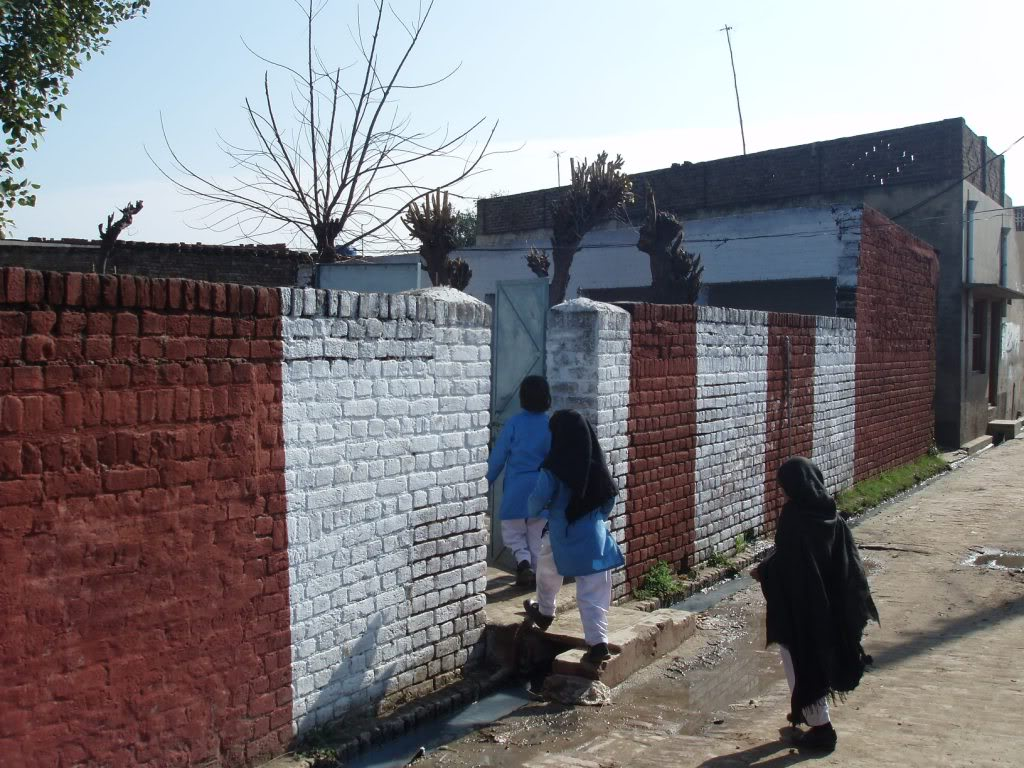
Girl's Primary School, Sabour

Today there are four Government Schools,

1. Government Primary School for Girls Sabour.
2. Government Primary School for Boys Sabour.
3. Government High School for Girls Sabour.
4. Government High School for Boys Sabour.

and few Private Schools.

There is one religious school Jamia Naqshbandiya Majadadia Nooria(Madrasa) founded by Great ISLAMIC Scholar Peer Irshad Hussain Noori Churahi (Rah.A) in Sabour. There are four Masjids in Sabour, two Jamiaa Masjids Jamia Masjid Faizan-e-Oulia, Jamia Masjid BaBa Phully wali and another two mosques in suburbs or newly built areas.

== Hospitals ==
1. One Government Rural Hospital Sabour (not yet operational).
2. Private Hospitals, Sadi Hospital (run by MBBS Doctor Fayyaz Hussain), three dispenser-type clinics [Dr. Ghulam Mustafa, Dr. Ghulam Nabi (Chakora), Dr. Habib Hashmi]

== Sabour Cricket Team ==
Sabour Cricket Team won the Daulat Nagar annual tournament thrice, and the Kotla annual tournament twice led by allrounder Malik Jawad. In 2002 and 2004, Malik Jawad also played for Royal Dutch cricket club Holland, Sabour team won many more tournaments. Sabour's cricket ground is alongside Stream (Nala Bhandar).
