= Raja Aziz Bhatti =

Pakistani military officer and war hero (1928–1965)

Major Shaheed Raja Aziz Bhatti NH
- راجہ عزیز بھٹی
- Born: 6 August 1928; British Hong Kong
- Died: 11 September 1965 (aged 37); Near Burki, Punjab, West Pakistan
- Burial place: Ladian, Gujrat District, Punjab, Pakistan
- Relatives: General Raheel Sharif (Nephew); Major Shabbir Sharif (Nephew)
- Military career
- Allegiance: Empire of Japan (1944–1945) (British Raj) British India (1946–1947); Pakistan (1947–1965)
- Service/branch: Imperial Japanese Navy (1944–1945); Royal Indian Air Force (1946–1947); Pakistan Air Force(1947–1948); Pakistan Army (1948–1965)
- Service years: 1944–1965
- Rank: Major
- Nicknames: Raja; A Great Hero; A. A.; Defender of Lahore
- Service number: PA-2695
- Units: 4/16th Punjab Regiment; 17 Punjab Regiment | Haidri Bn
- Conflicts: Indo-Pakistani War of 1947–1948; Indo-Pakistani War of 1965; Battle of Burki †
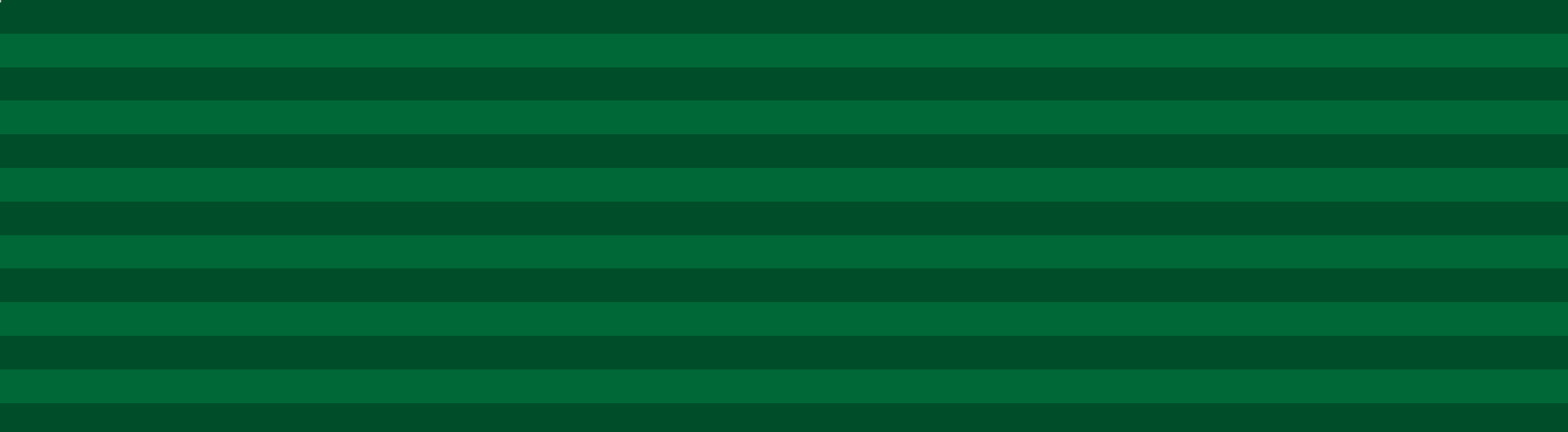
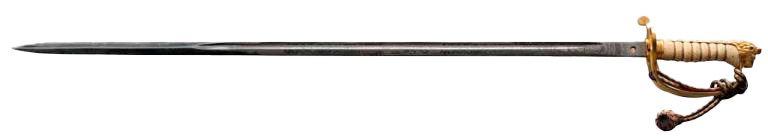
- Awards: Nishan-e-Haider Pakistan Medal Sword of Honor
- Website: Major Raja Aziz Bhatti

Raja Aziz Bhatti NH (Note: Punjabi: راجا عزیز بھٹی; Urdu: راجہ عزیز بھٹی) (6 August 1928 – 12 September 1965) was a Pakistani military officer and the 4th recipient of Pakistan's highest military honour, the Nishan-e-Haider, which he was posthumously awarded for his brave defence of Lahore during the Indo-Pakistani War of 1965.

Born in British Hong Kong, Bhatti attended the Queen's College and was later drafted into the Imperial Japanese Navy, during the Japanese occupation of Hong Kong, in 1944, first serving as a seaman recruit and later a tower watchman. The following year, he relocated to British India where he joined the British Indian Air Force as an airman in June 1946.

Following the partition of India in August 1947, Bhatti served as a corporal in the Pakistan Air Force and later successfully applied to join the Pakistan Army in 1948, and was promoted to the rank of major in 1962. During the Indo-Pakistani War of 1965, Bhatti was killed in action while defending Lahore in the Battle of Burki. He was awarded the Nishan-e-Haider posthumously for his actions during the battle, and is known in Pakistan as Muhafiz-i Lahore ("the defender of Lahore").

== Early life and education ==
Raja Aziz Bhatti was born in British Hong Kong on 6 August 1928 into a Punjabi Rajput (Bhatti clan) family with roots in Punjab. His family hailed from a small village about 23 miles away from the Gujrat city (now in Pakistan) of Punjab in British India, who had immigrated to British Hong Kong after his father and two uncles were employed in the Hong Kong Police Force. His father, Muhammad Abdullah Bhatti, was an alumnus of the Queen's College in Hong Kong who later served as an Inspector in the Hong Kong Police Force. Aziz Bhatti was educated in Hong Kong where he completed his matriculation and attended the Queen's College but his education was halted due to the Japanese invasion and occupation of Hong Kong in 1941.

== Military career ==
=== Imperial Japanese Navy ===
He was drafted into the Imperial Japanese Navy in 1944, first serving at the rank of the seaman recruit and as the tower watchman (observation post) before being directed to attend the officer school offered by the Imperial Japanese Navy due to his educational qualifications.

=== Royal Indian Air Force ===
However, in December 1945, the Bhatti family relocated to British India, and Aziz Bhatti enlisted to join the Royal Indian Air Force as an airman in June 1946.

=== Pakistan Air Force ===
After the establishment of Pakistan in 1947, Bhatti joined the Pakistan Air Force and was promoted as corporal (Cpl.), and continued to serve in the air force until 1948. Cpl. Bhatti was a prospective candidate to join the Air Force Academy in Risalpur and was known to be among the brightest members of the Pakistan Air Force in its early years.

After served in the Pakistan Air Force as an enlisted man, Bhatti left the air force as a corporal in a favor of transferring to the Army, gaining officer's commission in the Pakistan Army.

On 21 January 1948, Bhatti submitted an application to the Ministry of Defense (MoD), asking to be transferred to the Pakistan Army, which was approved and Bhatti was directed to attend the Pakistan Military Academy in Kakul in 1948. There, he distinguished himself in studies and athletics among his classmates, and passed out from the academy at the top of his class in the class of the first PMA Long Course, in 1950. He was awarded the Sword of Honor and the Norman gold medallion by the ceremony's chief guest, Prime Minister Liaquat Ali Khan. He was commissioned as the 2nd-Lt. in the 4th battalion of the 16th Punjab Regiment (4/16th Punjab Regiment). He was promoted to lieutenant in 1951 and to captain in 1953.

In 1956, Aziz was sent to Canada to attend the staff course at the Canadian Army Command and Staff College where he remained until graduation from strategic studies courses in 1960. Upon returning to Pakistan, Capt. Aziz was posted with the 17th Punjab Regiment as a General Staff Officer (GSO) until 1962. After being promoted as major in the Army in 1962, Maj. Aziz was taken into the faculty of the School of Infantry and Tactics in Quetta, which he remained until 1964.

=== Indo-Pakistani war of 1965 ===
From January till May 1965, Maj. Bhatti served as the General Staff Officer (GSO) of the 17th Punjab Regiment, but was later posted as the commander of the two military companies after the Indian Army's counterattack to Operation Gibraltar, crossing the international borders in September 1965. Leading the military companies, Maj. Bhatti was initially deployed on the forward positions of the BRB Canal near the Burki area that falls in the vicinity of the Lahore District in Pakistani Punjab.

Official engagement with the Indian Army took place between 7–10 September when the Indian Army begin its push in an attempt to capture the Burki sector through artillery and armory with a view to enter Lahore. During Indian Army's efforts to capture the Burki sector through the BRB Canal, the outnumbered military companies under Major Bhatti had forced the Indian Army to engage in hand-to-hand combat during the night of the 7/8 September 1965, and the fighting continued for the next three days despite Indian Army having numerical advantage. Although the defense of the Burki sector through the BRB Canal had less importance in the views of military strategists working at the Army GHQ in Rawalpindi, its defense was fierce and tenacious, and the Indian Army had to halt its plans of capturing Lahore and focused on capturing the Burki sector and destroying the bridge connecting the BRB Canal. It is unclear why the Pakistan Army did not send the reinforcement teams to provide back up to Maj. Bhatti's teams and the questionnaire-based controversy was later generated on why Maj. Bhatti and his teams were left alone to fight bravely for a long time.

Bhatti declined an offer to take leave with his family in Lahore and instead told a sergeant, "Do not recall me. I don't want to go back. I will shed the last drop of my blood in the defense of my dear homeland." Maj. Bhatti moved towards building up the trenches and positioned himself towards forward observation to view enemy movements, where he would often stand for a better view to direct howitzer fire.

Bhatti was killed on 12 September 1965. He stood up to observe enemy positions and direct artillery fire, despite warnings to take cover, and was killed by shellfire. Maj. Bhatti was 37 years old at the time of his death.

== Memorials ==
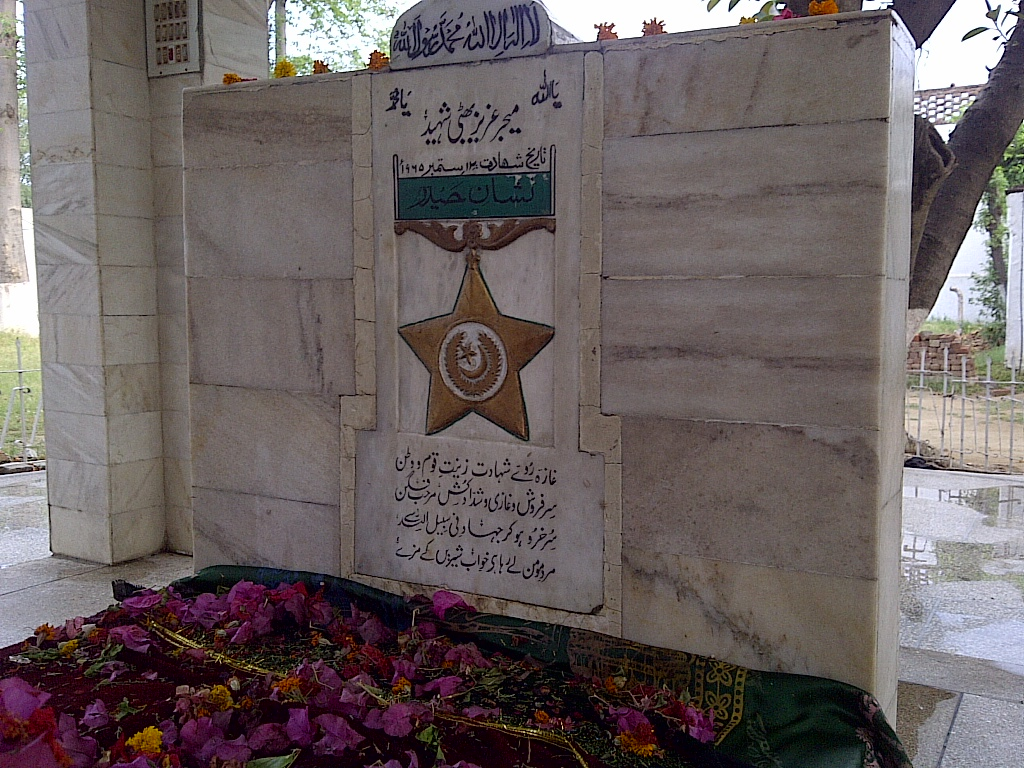
The Gravestone of Maj. Bhatti with the Nishan-e-Haider citation.

=== Ancestral home ===
Maj. Aziz Bhatti was buried in the courtyard of his ancestral home at Ladian, a small village near Gujrat, Punjab in Pakistan. In 1966, the federal government accepted the recommendations and announced to posthumously award the Nishan-e-Haider for his gallantry and actions of valor during the defense of the Burki.

Later the federal government funded to build the marble tombstone at his ancestral home in 1967 at his locality.

The Presidential Nishan-e-Haider citation on his grave is written in Urdu and is actually a poem; and it reads with translation as:

"Rouge on the face of shahadat, pride of the country and the nation are these fearless warriors, a strike of their sword wipes out the mightiest of foes this one who came out victorious in the struggle for the cause of ALLAH is lying here in the delight of the afterlife dream. Major Bhatti fought valiantly on Lahore Front, and is posthumously presented with the Nishan-e-Haider".

=== Memorial at Barki ===
A memorial to Major Aziz Bhatti was built in 2019 at the site where he was killed defending against an Indian attack on 6 September 1965. The memorial is located approximately 500 metres north of the Barki Road/BRB Canal checkpoint on the west side of BRB Canal. The citation reads as follows in English:

Major Raja Aziz Bhatti known as "Muhafiz-e-Lahore (Defender of Lahore)" received Pakistan's highest award for his valor. He was born in Hong Kong in a Muslim Rajput family (belonging to Lahore) in 1928. He got commissioned in the Pakistan Army in 1950 (17 Punjab Regiment). Major Aziz Bhatti was posted to Barki sector Lahore, during the Indo-Pak War 1965. Being a Company Commander, he moved his platoon forward to this bank of BRBLC [BRB Link Canal] under constant fire of enemy tanks and artillery. He resisted for five days and nights in defending this Pakistani outpost on the strategic BRBLC without rest. On 6 September 1965, he left his company Headquarters and moved to his forward Platoon and stayed with them under incessant artillery & tank attacks. He positioned himself in this elevated place to watch every move of the enemy. This point was vulnerable to enemy tank & artillery fire. After five days of continuous fighting on the front he was offered to be relieved for rest but he refused and said "I do not want to go back, I will shed the last drop of my blood in the defense of my dear homeland." On 10 September 1965, Major Aziz Bhatti was hit by an enemy tank shell in the chest while observing [the] enemy move from this elevated place. He was awarded the highest gallantry award of Nishan-e-Haider on his supreme act of bravery.

=== Galleries ===
Tomb and gravestone of Maj. Raja Aziz Bhatti
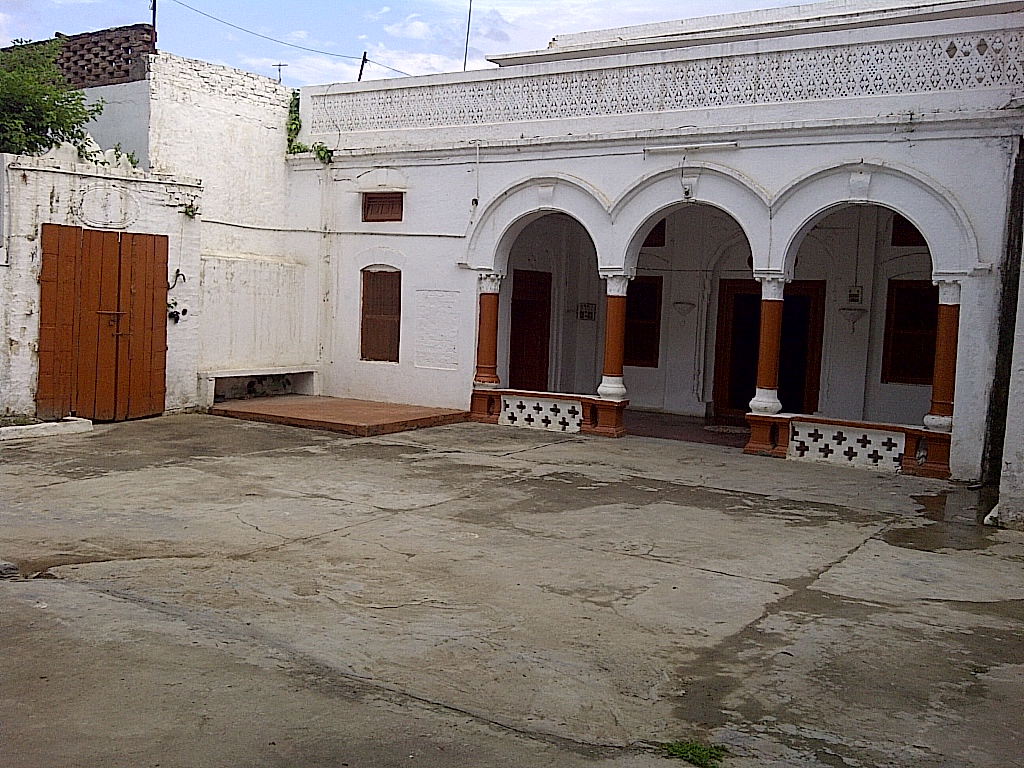
The courtyard of the ancestral home of Maj. Raja Aziz Bhatti.

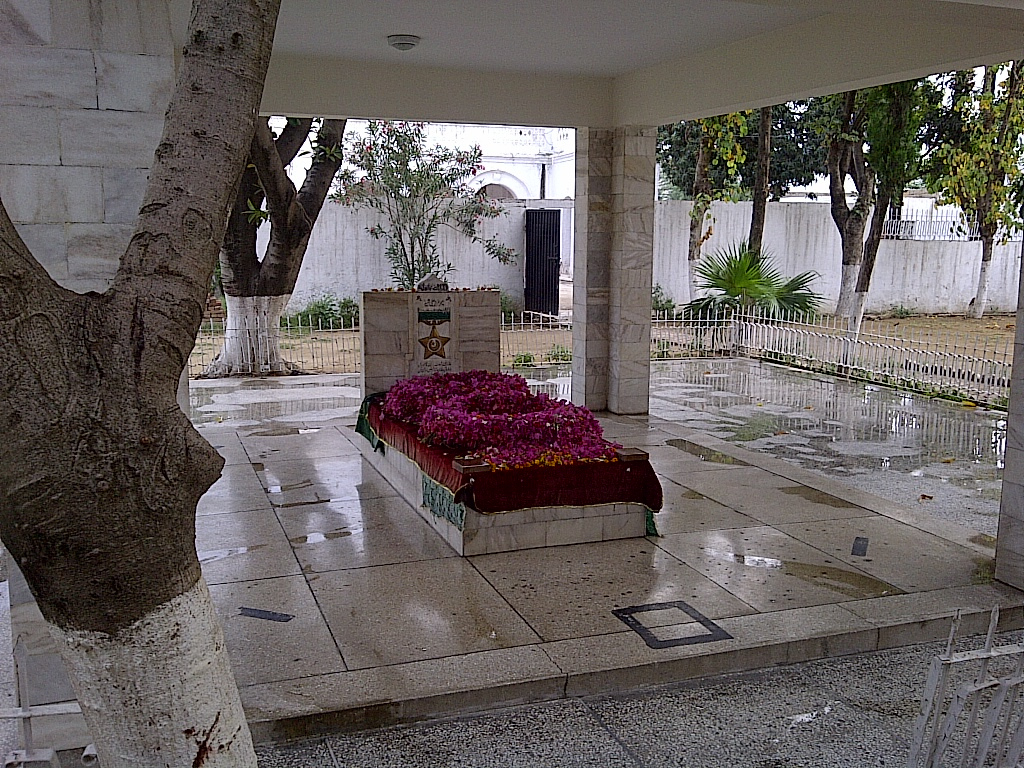
The grave of Maj. Raja Aziz Bhatti.

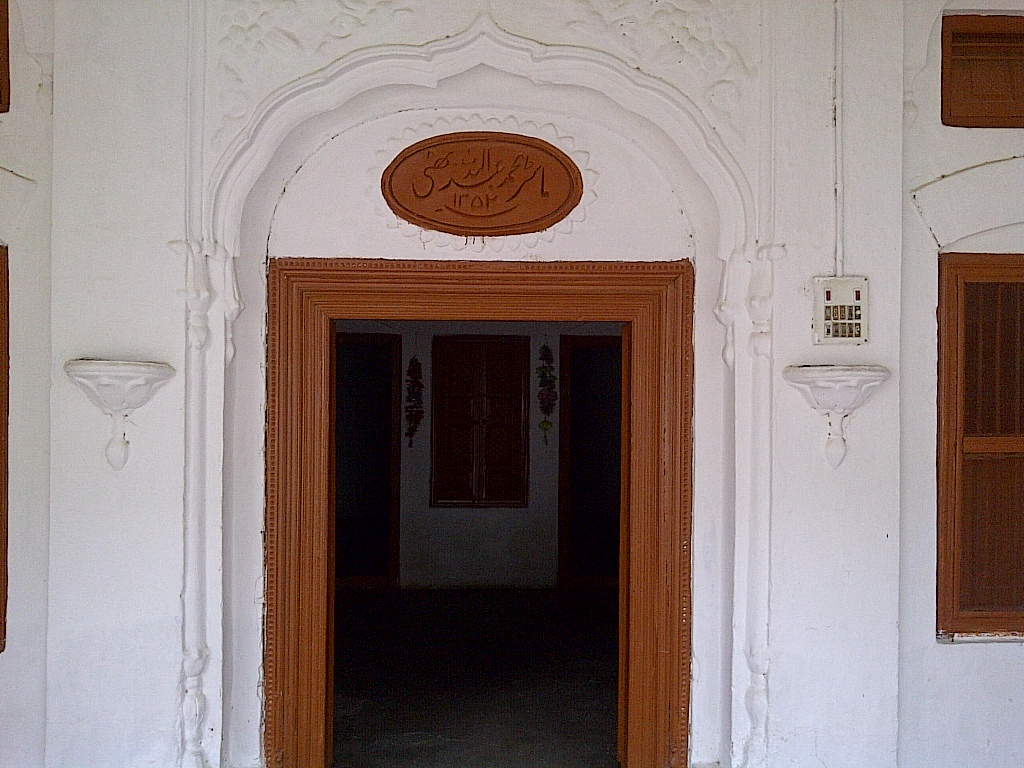
The entrance of the ancestral home of Maj. Raja Aziz Bhatti

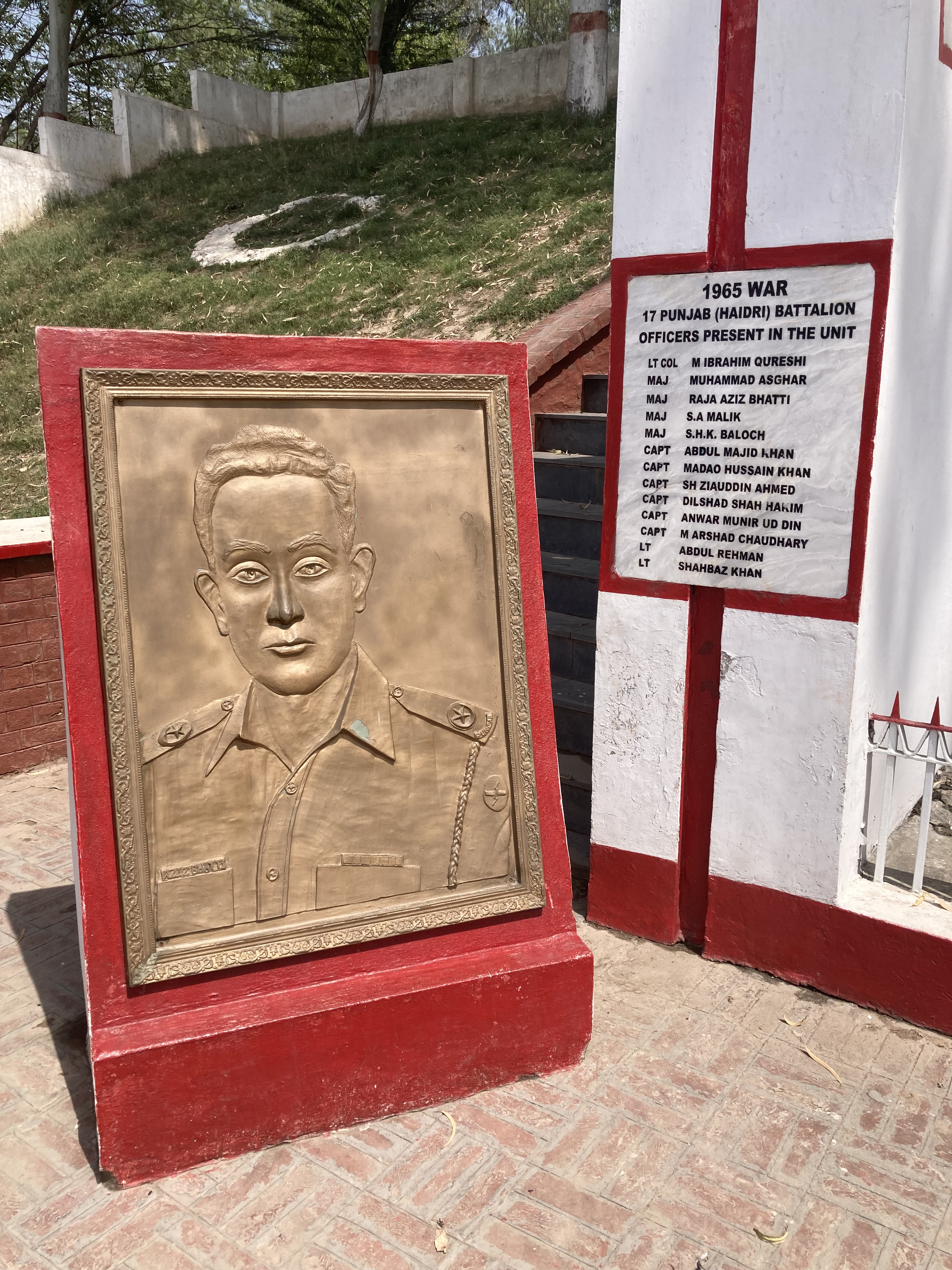
Likeness of Major Bhatti at his memorial near the site of his death near the BRB Canal

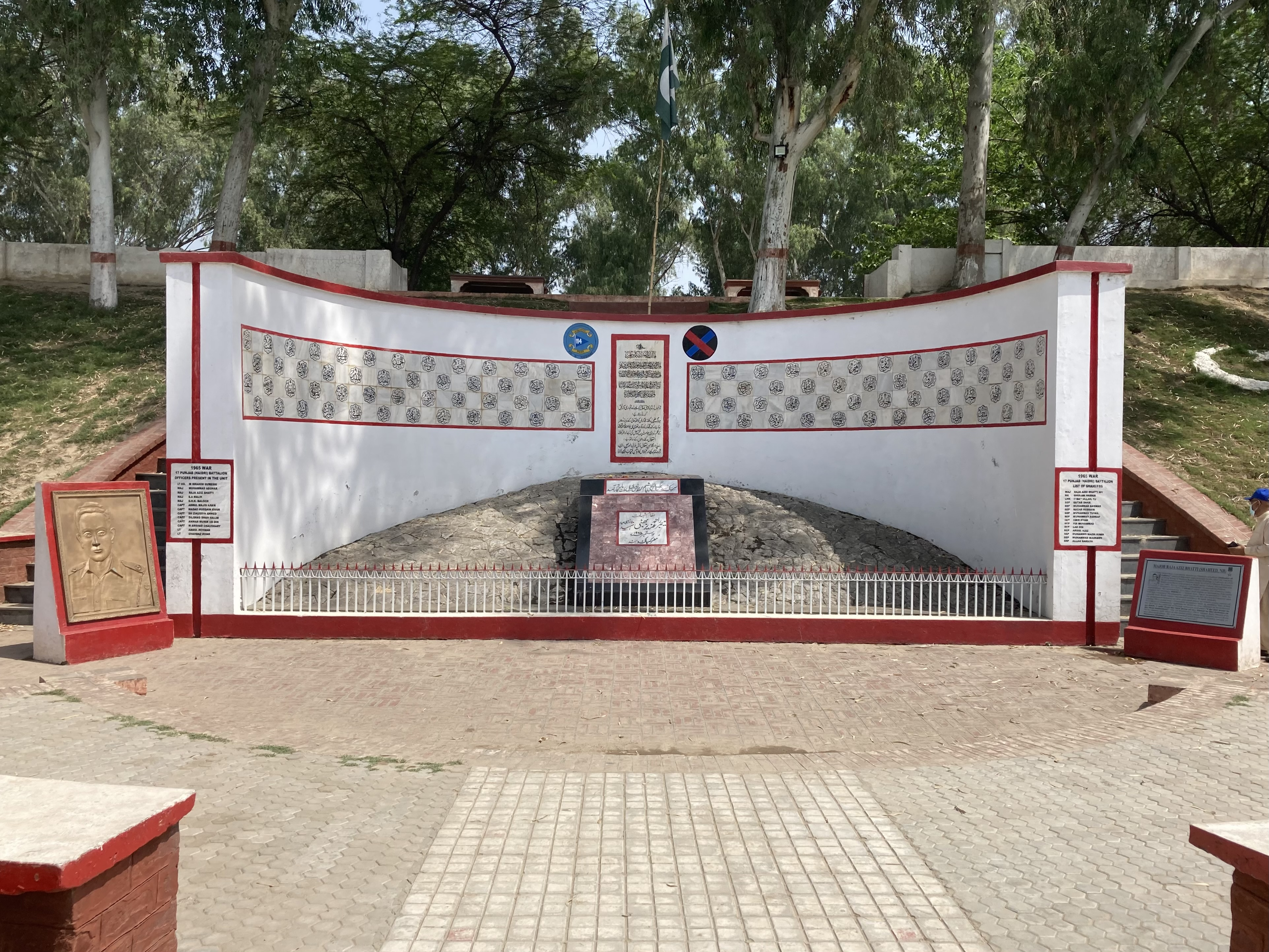
Picture of the memorial to Major Bhatti facing east, near the site of his death near the BRB Canal

== Popular culture and extended family ==
Bhatti is widely popular as the "Muhafiz-e-Lahore" (Defender of Lahore). In 1968, a paintings exhibition was inaugurated in Lahore, Punjab in Pakistan depicting Pakistan's war heroes including the first sketched portrait of Maj. Aziz Bhatti. In 1997, he was the subject of a popular and critically acclaimed biographical war drama telefilm, Major Raja Aziz Bhatti, produced by the ISPR and directed by Salim Tahir of the PTV.

It was reported in media that former Pakistan Army's General, Raheel Sharif who was the former Chief of Army Staff and Major Shabbir Sharif, another recipient of Nishan-e-Haider of Pakistan Army, are the nephews of Major Raja Aziz Bhatti.

His grandson Babar Bhatti, a Canada-based businessman, is married to the famous supermodel-turned-actress Iman Ali.

In 2019, his younger brother Sardar Bhatti wrote a book about him, Aziz Bhatti Shaheed My Brother, My Hero, published by Daastan Publishers.

== Awards and decorations ==
Nishan-e-Haider Recipient
- Date: 1965
- Country: Islamic Republic of Pakistan
- Presented by: President Ayub Khan

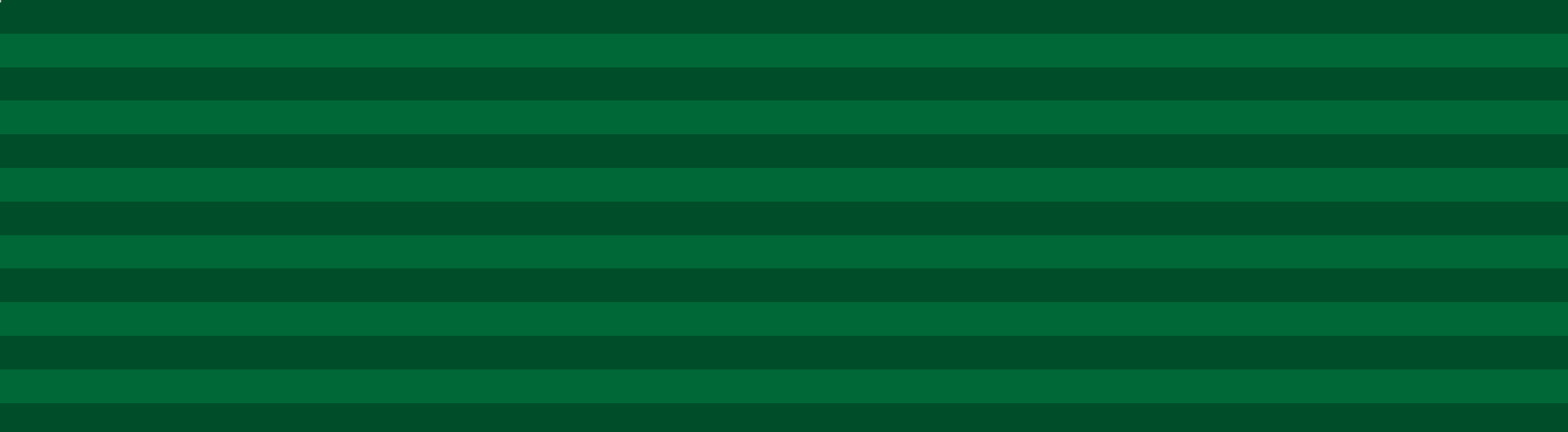

	Nishan-e-Haider (Emblem of the Lion) 1965 War Posthumously		
Sitara-e-Harb 1965 War (War Star 1965) Posthumously	Tamgha-e-Jang 1965 War (War Medal 1965) Posthumously	Pakistan Tamgha (Pakistan Medal) 1947	Tamgha-e-Jamhuria (Republic Commemoration Medal) 1956

== Bibliography ==
- Sardar Bhatti, Aziz Bhatti Shaheed My Brother, My Hero, 2019, Daastan Publishers.
