= Chak 382 GB Sarwarwali =

Village in Faisalabad, Pakistan

Chak 382 GB Sarwarwali is a village of about 5,000 people situated near the city of Jaranwala in Faisalabad District of Pakistan. There village has two primary schools: one each for girls and boys.

== Surroundings ==
It is situated left to the Gugera Branch Canal on the north side and Chak No. 357 GB on north-western side across the Gogera Branch. Eastern side near Thatti Gujran. There is a small canal which distributes water to many villages of the Dan Abad circle. Across the canal, there is a village named Chak No.381 G.B. to the north.

Map
