= Kohali, Faisalabad =

Kohali
- Village
- Location in Pakistan
- Coordinates: 31°7′45.36″N 72°47′56.80″E
- Country: Pakistan
- Province: Punjab
- district: Faisalabad district

Government
  - MNA: shehbaz Gujjar

Area
  - Total: 1.3 km^{2} (0.50 sq mi)
- Elevation: 563 m (1,847 ft)

Population
  - Total: 2,500
  - Density: 1,900/km^{2} (5,000/sq mi)
- Time zone: UTC+5 (PST)
- Calling code: 0413

Kohali is a village of union council 47-GB in Faisalabad District in the Punjab province of Pakistan. It is part of Samundri city, and located at latitude 31° 7'45.50"N and longitude 72°47'56.72"E with an altitude of 563 feet. It was very rich and historical village before independence. 10 to 15% people working abroad, mostly in France, the United States, Britain, UAE and Saudi Arabia. There are four mosques and one Imambargah in the village. More influential tribes and clans are Rajput, Jat, Arian, Kamboh, etc. The main occupation is agriculture. This village is located about 13 km (8.1 mi) from Gojra and about 18 km (11 mi) from Samundri.

More than 70% population of this village is connected directly or indirectly with agriculture. Most of the underground water is brackish. Sugarcane, wheat and cotton are the main crops cultivated in this village, which is irrigated by Gugera Branch Canal, which is a branch of Lower Chenab Canal. Literacy rate is very good comparatively, Four schools at per record (2 Gov+2 Private) and several people from this village are working at outstanding positions in various industries including doctors, engineers and finance sector, several in Pakistan Army at senior positions.
