= 66 Medium Regiment (India) =

Indian Army artillery unit

- Active: 1963 – present
- Country: India
- Allegiance: India
- Branch: Indian Army
- Type: Artillery
- Size: Regiment
- Nickname: Double Six
- Mottos: Sarvatra, Izzat-O-Iqbal (Everywhere with Honour and Glory).
- Colors: Red & Navy Blue
- Equipment: 130 mm guns

Insignia
- Abbreviation: 66 Med Regt

66 Medium Regiment is part of the Regiment of Artillery of the Indian Army.

== Formation ==
The regiment was raised as 66 Field Regiment on 01 February 1963 at Jalandhar Cantonment under the command of Lieutenant Colonel Bikram Chand VSM.

== Operations ==
The regiment has taken part in the following operations –

- Indo-Pakistani War of 1965: Barely two years after raising, the regiment took part in operations at Burki near Lahore and in the Khemkaran sector. The regiment was under 7 Infantry Division in Khemkaran. The regiment was awarded one Sena Medal, two mentioned in dispatches and one COAS Commendation Card.
- Indo-Pakistani War of 1971: The regiment participated in Operation Cactus Lily in the Shakargarh sector and was part of the 36 Infantry Division. It was awarded two Sena Medals and one mentioned in dispatches.
- Operation Brasstacks
- Operation Pawan: The regiment moved to Sri Lanka and was deployed in infantry role in Jaffna town and in the suburb of Kankesanthurai. Colonel Gurbachan Singh Babbar was awarded the Vishisht Seva Medal.
- Operation Rakshak: In November 1991, the regiment moved to Punjab for counter-insurgency operations. It maintained an incident free period in its area of responsibility and created an environment conductive for peaceful assembly elections.
- Counter insurgency operations in Jammu and Kashmir: During its tenure in Jammu and Kashmir from 1993, the regiment won one Sena Medal and four GOC-in-C Commendation Cards.
- Operation Vijay: The regiment was inducted into the Kargil sector in September 1999 was deployed in the Line of Control. Observation post officers destroyed enemy posts and a gun position across the line of control.
- Operation Parakram: The regiment which was located at Samba from November 2001 was mobilised for the operation and destroyed an enemy post, an ammunition dump and an enemy battalion headquarters.
- Counter insurgency operations in Jammu and Kashmir: During its second tenure, the regiment took part in counter insurgency operations at Udhampur and Kathua between 2001 and 2005. It was also part of road opening parties and quick reaction teams.
- Operation Rhino: The regiment was part of the 2 Mountain Artillery Brigade and took part in counter insurgency operations in Jorhat and Sivasagar districts of Assam between July 2005 and December 2008. During this tenure, the regiment was responsible for 7 kills, 35 apprehensions, 3 surrenders, arrest of 42 over ground workers, destruction of 3 terrorist camps and recovery of arms and ammunition. Nine COAS Commendation Cards and ten GOC-in-C Commendation Cards were awarded during Operation Rhino. The regiment was awarded the GOC-in-C (Eastern Command) unit citation.

== Notable personnel ==
- Lieutenant General Baljeet Singh PVSM, VSM. - Chief of Staff, Western Command was commissioned in the unit.

== See also ==
- List of artillery regiments of Indian Army
