= Saeed-ul Haq Dogar =

Pakistani politician

Sardar Saeed Ul Haq Dogar (سعيد الحق ڈوگر سردار )

Member of Provincial Assembly

Personal details
- Born: Saeed ul haq Dogar; December 4, 1946 Sheikhupura, West Pakistan, Asia
- Died: November 10, 2005 (aged 58) Lahore, Pakistan
- Resting place: Safdarabad
- Party: PML-N
- Children: Fahed Saeed, Mohsen Saeed
- Education: Government College, Sheikhupura (BA)

Sardar Saeed Ul Haq Dogar (Punjabi, Urdu: سردار سعيد الحق ڈوگر) (born 4 December 1946- died 10 November 2005) was a Pakistani politician who served as a Member of the Provincial Assembly from 1997 to 1999 in a Constituency PP-140 Sheikhupura.

In 1997, he was elected for Member of Provincial Assembly by a wide margin. He defeated incumbent Rai Ejaz Ahmad Khan who was MPA from this constituency and Minister of Forests from 1993 to 1996, and the brother of Rai Saeed Ahmad Khan who was Advisor to the Chief Minister.

== Personal life ==
He was born in Safdarabad, West-Pakistan on December 4, 1946, a year before the nation's founding. He came from a religious family. He attended Govt. High School at Safdarabad, and he later enrolled in Civil Lines College, Lahore. He obtained his BA degree from Government College, Sheikhupura and studied law privately.

His murdered brother was ex-MPA Safdar ul Haq Dogar and his uncle was ex-MPA Sardar Abdul Rasheed Dogar. He died on November 10, 2005, in Lahore.

Saeed ul Haq Dogar died in November 2006.

== Career ==
He worked in Lahore secretariat (Law Department) until 1990.

When Safdar was murdered, Saeed ul Haq was working in the Punjab Government Secretariat. Safdar's murder led Saeed to enter politics to serve the poor people. He was elected in the 1997 Elections as an independent candidate and later joined Pakistan Muslim League (N).

== See also ==
- Provincial Assembly of Punjab
- Dogar
- Pakistan
- Safdarabad
- MPA
- Sheikhupura
