= Chak 95 JB =

- Village
- Location in Pakistan
- Coordinates: 31°12′0.011″N 72°43′35.558″E
- Country: Pakistan
- Province: Panjāb
- District: Toba Tek Singh District
- Tehsil: Gojra

Area
  - Total: 4 km^{2} (1.5 sq mi)
- Elevation: 172 m (564 ft)

Population (2010)
  - Total: 8,242
- Time zone: UTC+5 (PST)
  - Summer (DST): UTC+6 (PDT)
- Post Code: 36120
- Area code: +9246

Chak 95 JB (JB: Jhang Branch) is a village in Gojra Tehsil, Toba Tek Singh District, Pakistan. Situated on Pensera Road and connected by a link road, its bus stop is known as Adda Korian. Chak 95JB is part of Union Council No. 11 along with other villages: 97jb, 95jb Gehri, 99jb, and 96jb.

Chak 95JB Gill is strategically located, linking to Pensera Road, Anna Pakka Road, and the canal, along with a train track. It has extended to two new small villages named Odh Basti and Christine Basti, which boast two graveyards, two schools, four mosques, one church, and basic facilities such as clean water, gas, electricity, roads, and sanitation systems. The majority of the village populace is engaged in agriculture and dairy businesses.

Village's main road has numerous potholes and cracks, making it difficult and unsafe for vehicles and pedestrians alike. The poor state of the road not only hinders daily commutes but also poses a significant risk of accidents.

Chak 95JB has a caste-based population, with Jutts in the majority. Gujjar, Rana, Arain, Malik, and Ansari castes are also well-represented.

== Location ==
Chak 95JB Gill is located 7.8 kilometers from Gojra and 40 kilometers from Faisalabad. Its neighboring villages include Chak 97JB, Chak 99JB, and Chak 362JB.

== Education ==
The village has two schools:

- Government Girls Community Model School 95JB for girls.
- Government Primary School 95JB for boys.

Many of the students commute to Gojra or Chak 97JB for further schooling.
