= Dabbora =

- Village
- Chak 38/JB
- Location within Pakistan
- Coordinates: 31°24′05″N 72°52′23″E
- Country: Pakistan
- Province: Punjab
- District: Faisalabad
- Time zone: UTC+5 (PST)

Chak 38/JB Dabbora (Dagora or Riwaaz Abad: Urdu: چک نمبر 38 ج ب ڈبورہ) is a village located at the boundary of Faisalabad district, Punjab, Pakistan. Its zip code is 37521.

The village is named according to the normal practice for a Chak (village) of canal colonies in Pakistani Punjab. The "JB" denotes Jhang Branch Canal, the source of the village's water supply.
