= Battle of Burki =

Battle of the Indo-Pakistani War of 1965

- Part of the Indo-Pakistani War of 1965
- Village of Burki
Date	8–11 September 1965 (3 days)
Location	Burki, Lahore, Pakistan 31.4771°N 74.5125°E
Result	Indian victory

Belligerents
India	Pakistan

Commanders and leaders
Har Krishan Sibal; Satish Chandra Joshi †; Anant Singh	Raja Aziz Bhatti †

Units involved
7 Infantry Division; 48 Infantry Brigade; 65 Infantry Brigade; 5 GUARDS; Central India Horse; 9 Madras; 4 Sikh; 16 Punjab; 6/8 Gorkha Rifles	10 Infantry Division; 103 Infantry Brigade; 17th Punjab Regiment

Strength
1 infantry division 1 armoured regiment	(3 Regiments); 2 Companies of 17th Punjab Regiment; 10 F-86 Sabre jets

The Battle of Burki (also known as the Battle of Lahore) was a battle between the Indian and Pakistan Army during the Indo-Pakistani War of 1965 at Burki, (Note: Also spelled Barki, Burkee and Barkee.) a village that lies 11 km south-east of Lahore, Pakistan near the border with India and which is connected to Lahore by a bridge over the Bambawali-Ravi-Bedian Canal (BRB Canal).

During the battle, Indian infantry clashed with Pakistani forces that were entrenched in pillboxes, dug-outs and slit trenches that had been carved into the canal banks. The Pakistanis were supported by a large number of tanks and air support from the No. 19 Squadron PAF. The battle resulted in an Indian victory and a withdrawal of Pakistani forces towards Dograi. On the evening of 7 September, Indian forces also succeeded in entering the town of Manhala. The Indian Army went on to capture Dograi on 21 September 1965 in the Battle of Dograi.

== Background ==
Pakistan launched Operation Grand Slam on 17 August 1965 in an effort to relieve infiltrators who had been surrounded after the failure of Operation Gibraltar on 15 August and to attempt to cut off the Indian supply lines. With supply lines under severe stress due to Operation Grand Slam, India launched an offensive towards Lahore to open up a second front in the war and distract Pakistani attention from Kashmir. After opening the Lahore Front, Indian troops advanced towards Lahore along three axes – the Amritsar-Lahore, Raja Tal-Manhala, Khalra-Burki-Lahore and Khemkaran-Kasur roads – overwhelming the small Pakistani force.

Indian infantry, supported by the only Indian armoured division, quickly pushed back unprepared Pakistani defenders with the aim of encircling and possibly besieging Lahore. Due to the element of surprise, India was able to capture a large amount of Pakistani territory from the town of Khalra, an Indian border town which lies on a straight road to Lahore through Burki. In the meantime, the Pakistan Army mobilised the troops in the region and mounted a three-pronged counter-attack to recapture lost ground. The Battle of Burki was subsequently fought on Khalra-Burki-Lahore road.

Pakistan's main goal was to force the Indian infantry into retreat before their armoured support and supply lines could catch up. The Pakistan Army's aim also was to capture much of the territory it had lost earlier in the fighting. The Indian infantry's aim was to capture and hold the town of Burki until reinforcements, including armour and supplies, could arrive.

== Battle ==
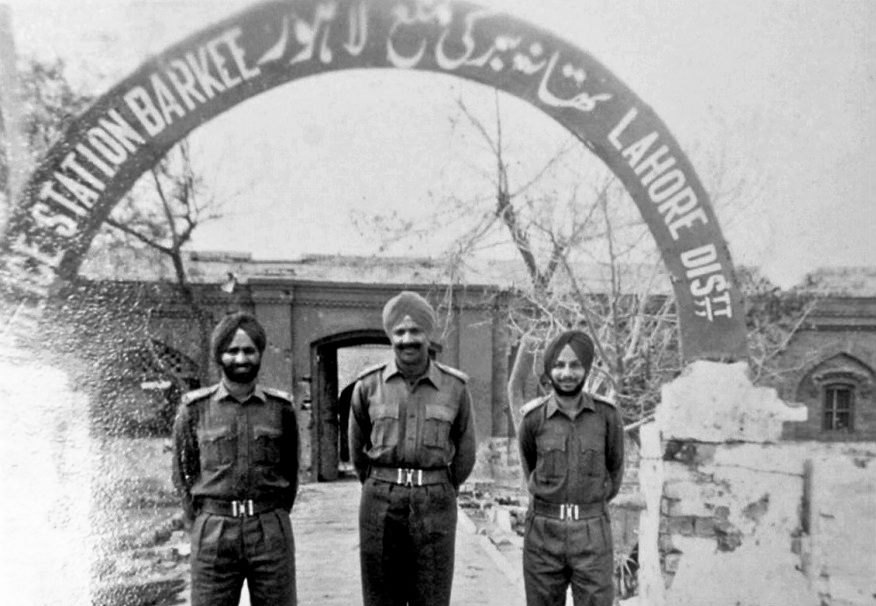
Officers of 4th Sikh Regiment posing outside a captured Pakistani police station in Burki, Lahore District.

India began their advance from Khalra under Major-General Har Krishan Sibal and tank operations under Lieutenant-Colonel Anant Singh with a village called Jahman being the first major Pakistani outpost to fall. In the Burki-Manhala sector, Pakistani troops pulled back towards the next major towns of Manhala and Burki, leaving small pockets of resistance at each village to slow down Indian advance.

Despite the Indian Army's capture of the Burki sector through the Bambawali-Ravi-Bedian Canal, the outnumbered military companies under Major Raja Aziz Bhatti had forced the Indian Army to engage in hand-to-hand combat during the night of the 7–8 September 1965, and the fighting continued through the next three days despite the Indian Army's numerical advantage. Subsequently, the Indian Army's armour columns had to focus on securing the Burki-Manhala sector as well as destroying the bridge connecting the Bambawali-Ravi-Bedian Canal.

On 8 September, Pakistan began the counter-attack with Pakistani artillery pounding the Indian advance on 8, 9 and 10 September. The constant shelling slowed down the Indian advance but failed to stop it completely. This was followed by a counterattack by Pakistani armour consisting of a considerable part of Pakistan's 1st Armoured Division. Indian infantry eventually clashed with Pakistani tanks at Burki village, which resulted in most of the Pakistani armour being damaged or destroyed by 10 September.

The Indian infantry was able to hold off the Pakistani armoured units until Indian tanks from the 18th Cavalry Regiment arrived. They were then able to subsequently launch the main assault on 10 September with armour support. As most of the Pakistani tanks had already been lost, the Pakistani defenders had little armoured support from the remaining tanks. The 4th Sikh and 16th Punjab mounted an attack on Pakistani positions held by 17th Punjab and 12th Punjab. The latter’s commander, Major Abdul Habib Khan, was killed, causing a withdrawal from the east bank of the BRB Canal. Alpha Company 17th Punjab found itself exposed and under increasing pressure. Despite communications being cut after an artillery strike, fire support continued, and the defenders fought fiercely. Indian commanding officer, Lieutenant-Colonel Satish Chandra Joshi of the armoured regiment was killed in action. A few Pakistani fighter jets were called in to provide air cover for Pakistani troops and to target Indian positions. However, the use of fighters to perform strafing against ground troops instead of bombers meant that little was achieved through air support. The limited number of jets and the easy availability of trenches and defensive structures for cover added to the ineffectiveness of Pakistani air operations. During the night of 10/11 September, Pakistani forces began a withdrawal under the supervision of Major Bhatti. As a result, after intense fighting, the Indian army captured Burki on 11 September and held it throughout the rest of the war.

== Aftermath ==
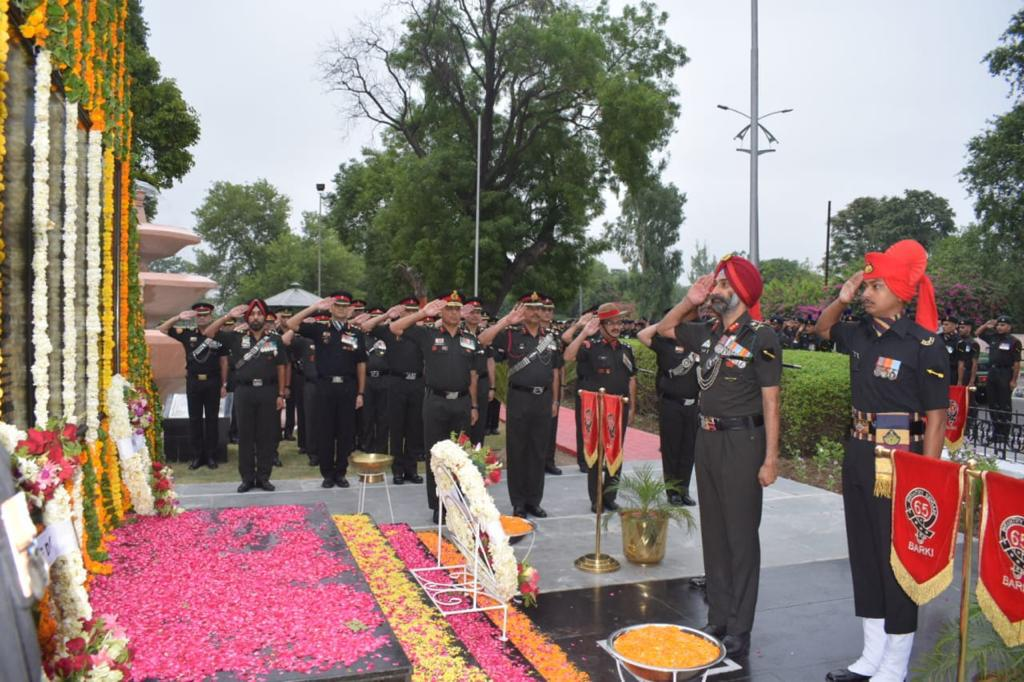
7th Infantry Division celebrating its 60th Raising Day at Burki War Memorial, July 2022. The division fought decisive battles to capture Burki during 1965 War.

On 12 September, Bhatti, who was positioned across the canal, was killed by Indian tank shelling.

After the capture of Burki, the Indian advance continued towards Dograi, a town in the immediate vicinity of Lahore. The town and surrounding areas were captured on 22 September, bringing the city of Lahore within range of Indian tank fire.

== Awards ==
Battle Honour of Barki and Theatre honour of Punjab 1965 was conferred on the following Indian units:

- The Central India Horse (CIH)
- 16th Punjab
- 4th Sikh
- 9th Madras
- 5th Guards

The Pakistani commander, Bhatti was later posthumously awarded the Nishan-e-Haider, the highest military decoration given by Pakistan.

== See also ==
- Battle of Chawinda
- Battle of Manhala
