= Kohali =

Kohali is the name of two places:

- Kohali (Faisalabad District)
- Kohali (Jhelum District)
