= Safdarabad Tehsil =

Safdarabad Tehsil تحصِيل صفدرآباد
- Tehsil
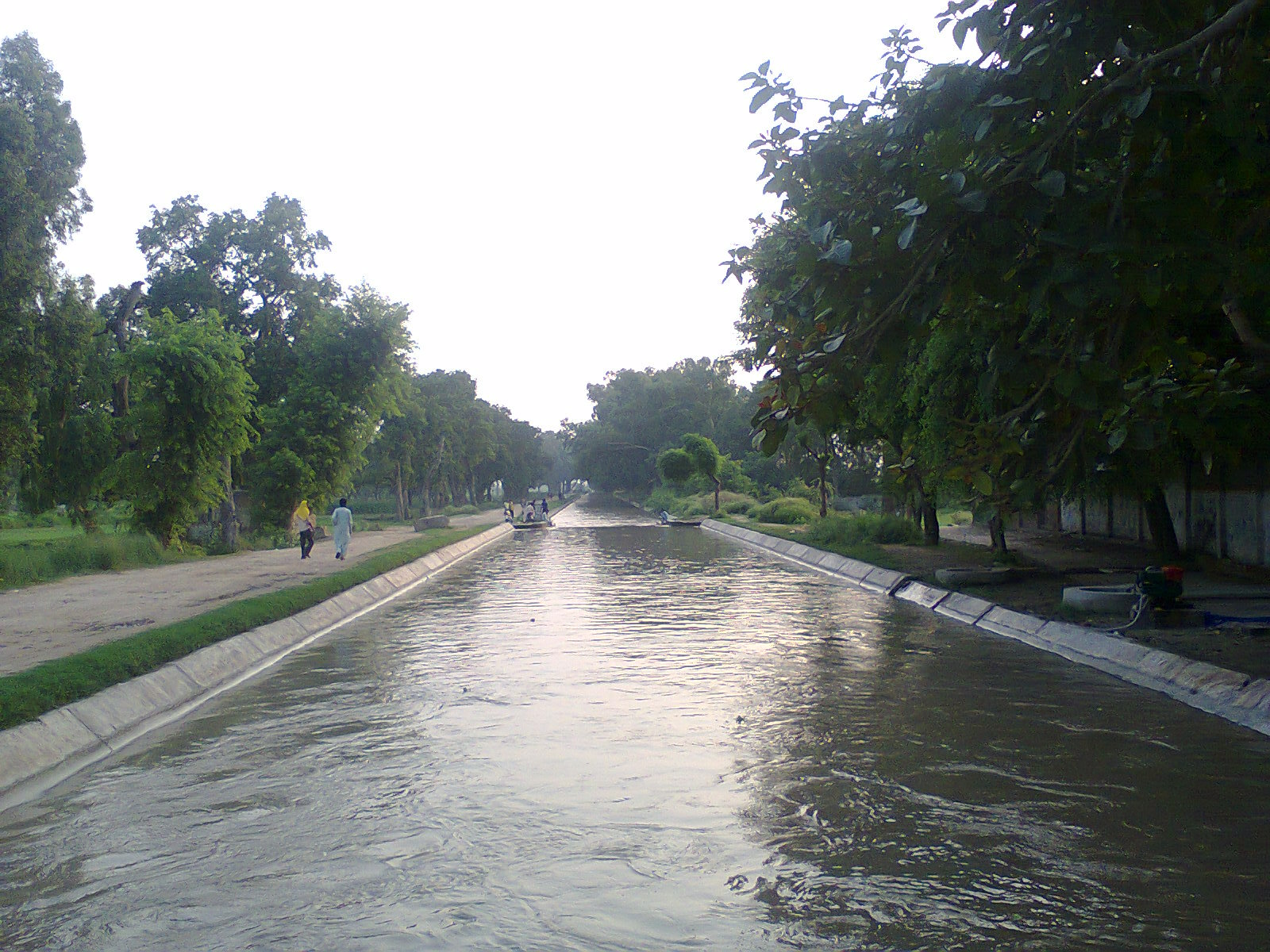
- Safdarabad Canal at the entrance of Safdarabad City
- Country: Pakistan
- Region: (Punjab, Pakistan) Punjab
- District: Sheikhpura
- Capital: Safdarabad
- Towns: 1

Government
  - Administrator/Assistant Commissioner: Mr. IMRAN ALI HARAL, PMS/BS-17

Population (2017)
  - Tehsil: 272,500
  - Urban: 54,085
  - Rural: 218,415
- Time zone: UTC+5 (PST)

Safdarabad (Urdu: تحصِيل صفدرآباد) is an administrative subdivision (Tehsil) of Sheikhupura District in the Punjab province of Pakistan. The city of Safdar Abad is the headquarters of the tehsil, until 2005 it was a tehsil of Sheikhupura District, but in that year Sheikhpura was bifurcated and the district of Nankana Sahib was created. - with Safdarabad as one of its tehsils. Now at present (since 01-12-2012), once again Safdarabad has been rejoined with Sheikhupura as a Tehsil. The city of Safdarabad lies 95 km from Lahore the provincial capital of Punjab. The tehsil has a population of more than 270,000 the majority of whom are Muslims.

== Economy ==
Agriculture is one of the main sources of employment, the town has been a popular grain market for last 75 years as the town is located in a highly fertile area. The Rakh Branch canal passes near one side of the Safdarabad city to Sangla Hill and is an irrigation source. On the other hand, a large variety of shoes is prepared here and transported to different cities.

Shiblee college for women safdrabad

== Education ==
There are many educational institutes in city Safdarabad.

- Wisdom Inn Public School
- Faran Leadership School
- Afzal Ideal Public School
- Green Field Academy School
- Quaid-e-Azam Ideal Public School - QAIPS
- Al-Rehman School of Alpha Studies (ASAS)
- Eden Public School
- Government associate college for women Safdarabad
- Government High School ( boys) Hospital road Safdarabad
- Govt. Vocational Training Institute for Girls
- Divisional Public School-DPS
- Punjab Public High School
- Safdarabad College of Commerce
- Gazali School System Safdar Abad
- Al-khidmat foundation Safdar Abad
- Child care foundation
- Siddique Public school
- Government Usmania Islamia high school Nawanpind.
- Talha Irtsam Academy
- Qasim Public School (QPS) Nawankot
- Pakistan Model Secondary School
- Salman Public School (Nawan Pind Chak 78R.B)
- Minhaj Ul Qur'aan Model Secondary School
- New asas high school
- City star school
- Government associate college for boys Sangla hill road Safdarabad

== Railway station ==
The central railway station is the main railway station of Safdarabad built during the British region around the nineteenth century. The station is used to take people to all parts of Pakistan from Karachi, Lahore, Rawalpindi, Quetta, Peshawar and many more cities and towns of Pakistan by Rail.

A large amount of cargo is daily exported and imported into Safdarabad with many deliveries a day from all parts of the Punjab Province.

== Boutter Market ==
This market is situated right in the middle of the city. It consist of around 350 shops and there is a mosque in the center of market. UBL, Boutter marriage hall, Boutter cable network and utility store are the salient feature of this market.

== Hameed Garden ==
A residential and commercial town in Safdarabad with great location and facilities. Hameed Garden was named after Rana Abdul Hameed Khan.

== Darbar (Mazarat) ==
There are many mazarat in the city and its surrounding areas. One of the most holy Darbar (Shrine) is located in village Dhaban Khurd near Safdarabad city. Every year a grand Urs is held there, where hundreds of followers come to celebrate it. The celebrations of this Urs continues for two days. This is the village where Hazrat Syed Bahadar Ali Shah Gilani (Qadri, Noshai), father of Syed Ehsan Ali Bahadar spent many years and did guide the people toward spiritual knowledge. There are two graves in the shrine: One belongs to Baba Nazam Din Shah who is Gujjar by caste and the Khalifa of Syed Maoj Ali Shah of Village Jiwan Pur Gujjran Tehsil Garhshankar district. Hoshiarpur India. While the second grave belongs to Hazrat Syed Karam Ali Shah Gilani died approximately 300 years ago. Syed Karam Ali Shah Gilani is the son of Hazrat Mubarak Shah Haqani whose holy shrine is in the city of Uch, Bahawalpur.
