= Ladian =

Ladian لادیاں
- Location within Pakistan
- Coordinates: 32°48′06″N 74°02′03″E
- Country: Pakistan
- Province: Punjab
- District: Gujrat
- Tehsil: Kharian
- Elevation: 277 m (909 ft)
- Time zone: UTC+5 (PST)

Ladian is a small village in Kharian Tehsil, Gujrat District, Punjab, Pakistan. It is known for its brave son Major Raja Aziz Bhatti Shaheed, who is the recipient of the Nishan-e-Haider (Lit.: Emblem of Lion), the highest military gallantry award of Pakistan. Ladian is located at 32°48'06"N 74°02'03"E

Most of the population of the village belongs to the Rajput, Gujjar and Jat castes. The other castes are Bhatti and Kashmiri. The Haqlay, Mehar, Ladi, Mian, Padhana, Khari, Chandi are Gujjar sub-castes. The name of the village refers to the Ladi caste. It is believed that the Ladis established the village and other castes migrated here subsequently.

Agriculture is the mainstay of the economy. Different types of corps are cultivated throughout the year.

== Education ==
Literacy Rate of the village is 40%. Most of the people are settled in European, America & Arab countries. Every year on 6 September, a very graceful army parade is conducted. The only road is from Kharin to Kotla Arab Ali Khan. This road has an important role from a defence point of view, as this road connects the main cantonment to the border area towards Azad Kashmir.

The village has 4 Schools & one Rural health Dispensary serving the people. The special contribution of Mr.Sardar Bhatti in education is highly appreciated to improve the education standards. Beaconhouse school system and other good schools are also in the vicinity of 25 minutes drive from the village. Main G.T Road connecting Islamabad and Lahore is about 40 minutes drive from the village.

== Notable people ==
Raja Aziz Bhatti

== Neighborhood ==
Some of the important towns and village's in the vicinity are: Guliana, Bhagwal, Lalamusa, Kharian, Bhurach Basoha, Sabour, Daulat Nagar, Gujrat, Bhimber, Azad Kashmir, Kotla Arab Ali Khan, and Kakrali.

== Sports ==
Cricket & Volleyball are popular games among younger people, many of which seek to eventually visit Europe and America.
