= Gogera =

Saddar Gogera
- Bangla Saddar Gogera
- Location within Pakistan
- Coordinates: 30.58°N 73.18°E
- Country: Pakistan
- Elevation: 166 m (545 ft)
- Time zone: UTC+5 (PST)

Gogera (Urdu: گوگيره), is a town and union council of Okara District in the Punjab province of Pakistan. It is located at 30°58'4N 73°18'24E at an altitude of 166 metres (547 feet) and lies 25 kilometres (16 mi) to the north-west of the district capital Okara.

== History ==
Gogera was head of this region during the rebellion of 1857. It remained the administrative seat of the region until the capital was shifted to Montgomery district (now Sahiwal District). Lord Burkley's grave is at Gogera who was the commissioner of Gogera and was killed in battle with Rai Ahmad Khan Kharal after mutiny.

== See also ==
- Gugera Branch Canal
- Rai Ahmad Khan Kharal
- Chak (village) GB Gugera Branch Canal
