= Chura Sharif =

- Union Council
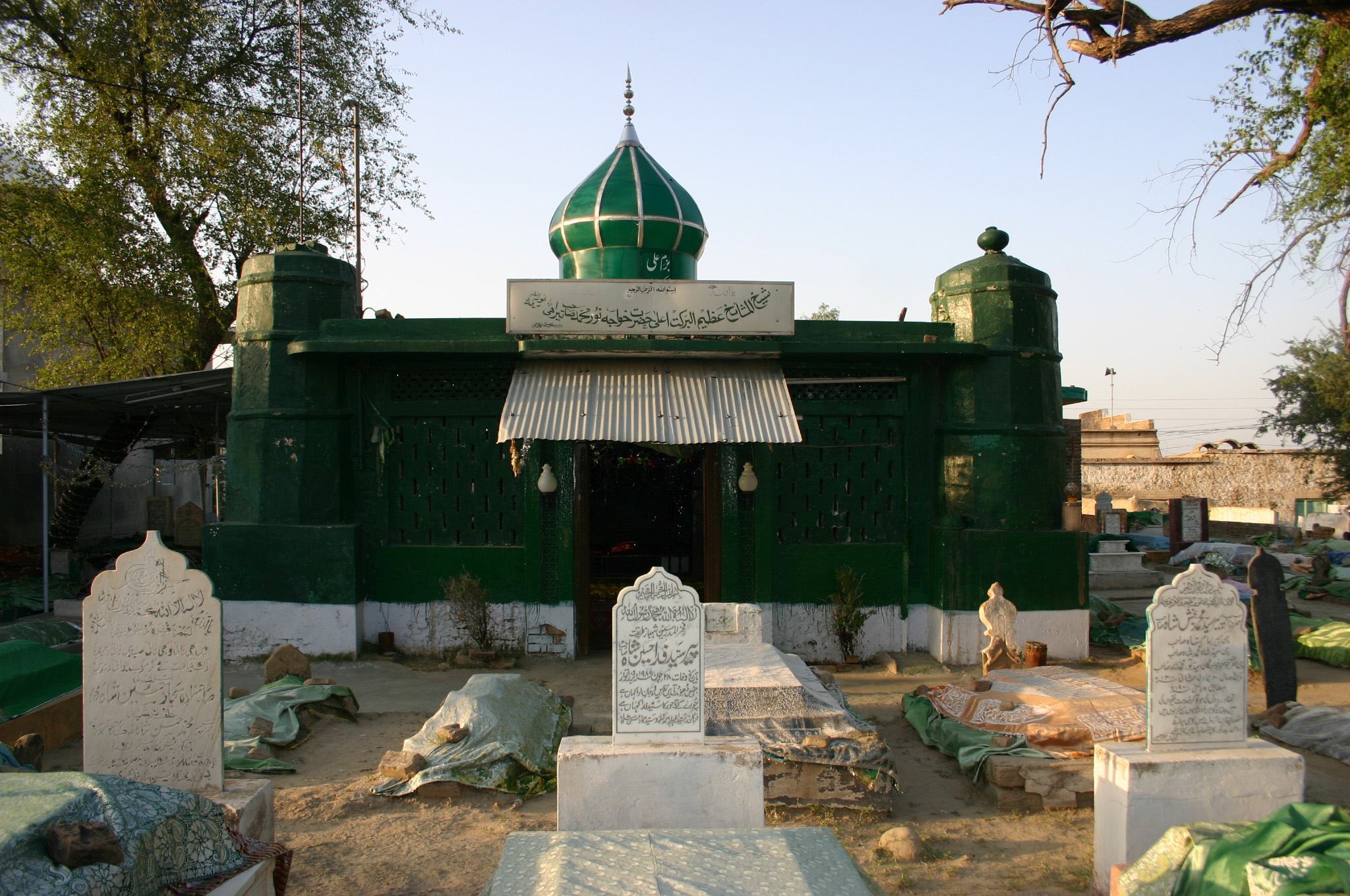
- Shrine of Khawaja Noor Muhammad

- Location within Pakistan
- Coordinates: 33°41′33″N 72°27′12″E
- Country: Pakistan
- Province: Punjab
- District: Attock
- Tehsil: Jand
- Time zone: UTC+5 (PST)
- Website: churasharif.com churasharif.pk

Chura Sharif is a village situated in Jand Tehsil of Attock District in Punjab Province of Pakistan. Chura Sharif has the largest Naqshbandi shrine in the Indian Sub-continent. It is the centre of the Naqshbandi order in the sub-continent.

== Education ==
The village has two government school, a high school each for boys and girls.

Government Boys High School Chura Sharif

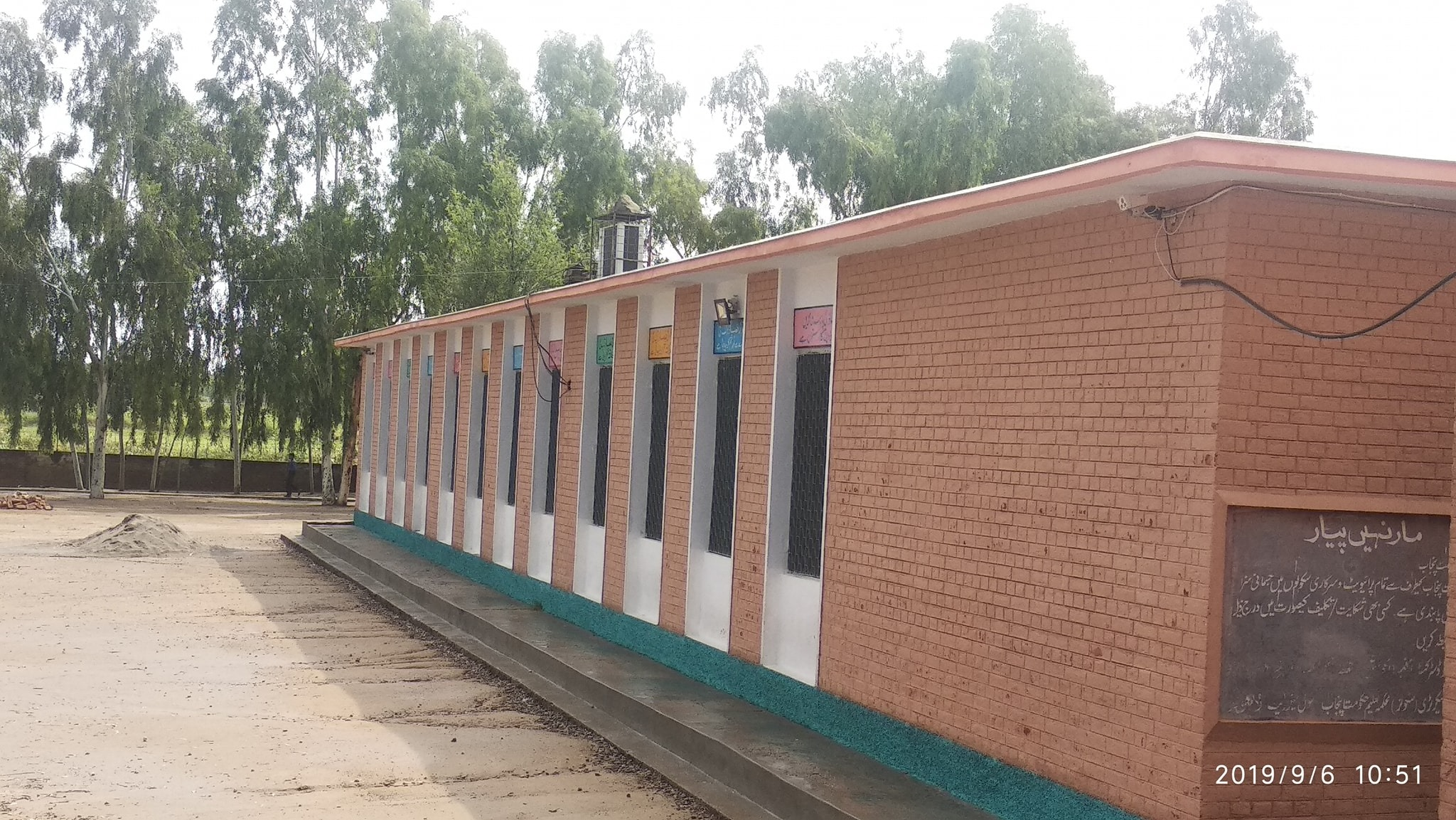
Picture of GBHS Chura Sharif
