= Rakh Branch =

Canal in Punjab, Pakistan

Coordinates: 31°58′N 73°37′E

Rakh Branch Canal نہر رکھ برانچ
- Interactive map of Rakh Branch Canal نہر رکھ برانچ

Specifications
- Length: 85 miles (137 km)
- Status: Open

History
- Construction began: 1892

Geography
- Start point: Lower Chenab Canal, few kms away from the Sukheki
- End point: Samundari
- Branch of: Lower Chenab Canal

The Rakh Branch Canal originates from the Lower Chenab Canal in Gujranwala District. The main areas it supplies water to are Hafizabad, Nankana Sahib and Faisalabad in Punjab province of Pakistan. Rakh Branch canal irrigates the land of 283 villages.

The canal was dug in 1892 during British India colonial rule. The Rakh Branch originates from canal Lower Chenab, which in turn emanates from Head Khanki at the river Chenab. It passes and produces tributaries in three districts such as Hafizabad, Nankana Sahib and Faisalabad.

Many famous towns are situated along or near Rakh Branch such as Safdarabad, Sangla Hill, Salarwala, Chak Jhumra, Gatwala, Abdullahpur and Faisalabad. The canal ends at Samundri.

Land of 283 villages is irrigated through Rakh Branch. The names of these villages end with the suffix RB (Rakh Branch) and start with the no of mogha (source of water point from canal), such as like 1 RB Prokian, 59 RB Warian, 103 RB Phalahi Wala, 213 RB Susan etc.
