= Safdarabad =

Safdarabad صفدرآباد
- City
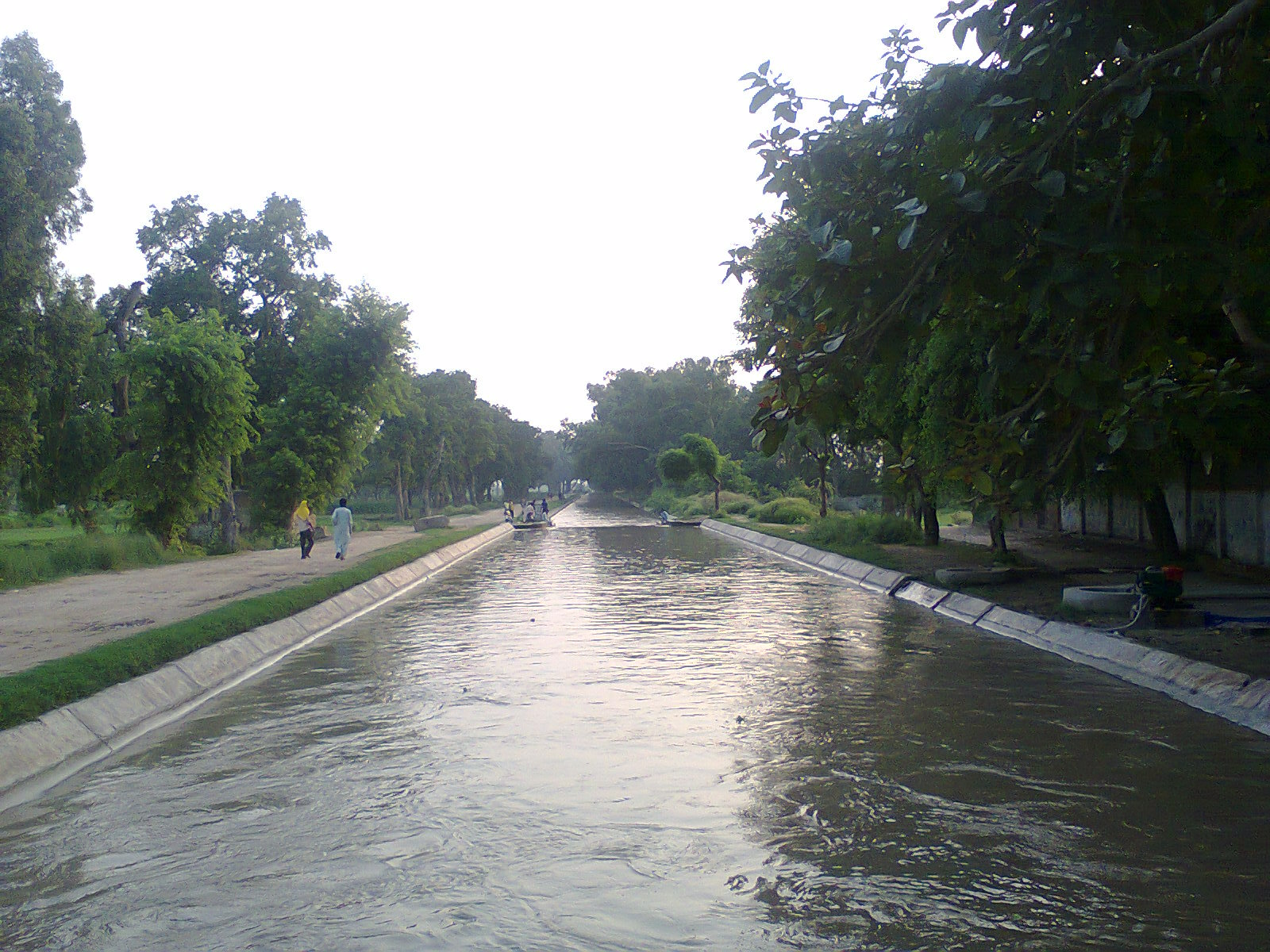
- Safdarabad Canal

- Safdarabad Safdarabad (Pakistan)
- Coordinates: 31°43′53″N 73°34′38″E
- Country: Pakistan
- Region: Punjab
- District: Sheikhupura District
- Postal Code, Zip Code: 39540

Population (2023)
  - Total: 54,242
- Time zone: UTC+5 (PST)
- Zip code: 39540

Safdarabad (Urdu: صفدرآباد) is a city in Sheikhupura District in the Punjab province of Pakistan. The city of Safdar Abad is the capital of Safdarabad Tehsil. Its Postal code or ZIP code is 39540. Its urban area is approximately 600 acres. Until 2005 it was a tehsil of Sheikhupura District, but in that year Sheikhpura was bifurcated and the district of Nankana Sahib was created. - with Safdarabad as one of its tehsils. Now at present (since 01-12-2008), once again Safdarabad has been rejoined with Sheikhupura as a Tehsil of it. The city of Safdarabad lies 95 km from Lahore the provincial capital of Punjab. The city has a population of more than 54,242 the majority of whom are Muslims. There are many engineering and medical students from Safdarabad admitted to different universities across Pakistan, including UET, Lahore. Safdarabad is now developing and has changed a lot in the past few years.

== History ==
Safdarabad, formerly known as Mandi Dhaban Singh, is a City of Sheikhupura District in the Punjab province of Pakistan. Mandi Dhaban Singh has been a famous grain market and it was named after Dhaab Singh a Sikh settler in the area after 1876 settlement plan of British Colonialists. Firstly, mandi Dhabban singh was just a railway station and it was after Chaudhry Chunni Laal (a Hindu investor and entrepreneur) the city had taken a new look, Chunni Laal was an excellent entrepreneur and had owned almost 80% capital of the city. He had a cotton factory called "Chaudhery Cotton Mill", a last chimney of this factory was replaced by The Boutter Market. The City is the headquarter of Safdarabad Tehsil - an administrative subdivision of the district. Safdarabad was named after Mr Safdar-Ul-Haq Dogar Known as "Chabba Dogar". He was a Member Of Provincial Assembly who was murdered in 1989 in front of Punjab Assembly Lahore. He was nephew of X-MPA Sardar Abdul Rasheed Dogar (1990 election) and Brother of X-MPA Sardar Saeed-ul Haq Dogar (1997 election). The then Chief Minister, Mian Nawaz Sharif named the city safdarabad after him on his visit after Safdar's Death, but when Rai Ijaz won the election of provincial assembly in 1993 and become provincial minister for forests then Safderabad was once named as "Ahmed pur" after Haji Ahmed hassan father of both Rai saeed and Rai Ijaz. In 1997 general election again dogar group won the election of provincial assembly and asked Mian Shahbaz shareef to issue a notification once again regarding name of the city, Shahbaz shareef restored the name "Safdarabad", Fight on naming the city after their own loved ones remained furious for a decade and the then DPO sheikhupura and some other officials had requested both dogar and rajput groups to bury the hatchet. Both groups were called in a mosque and were sworn to remain agree on one name "Safderabad".

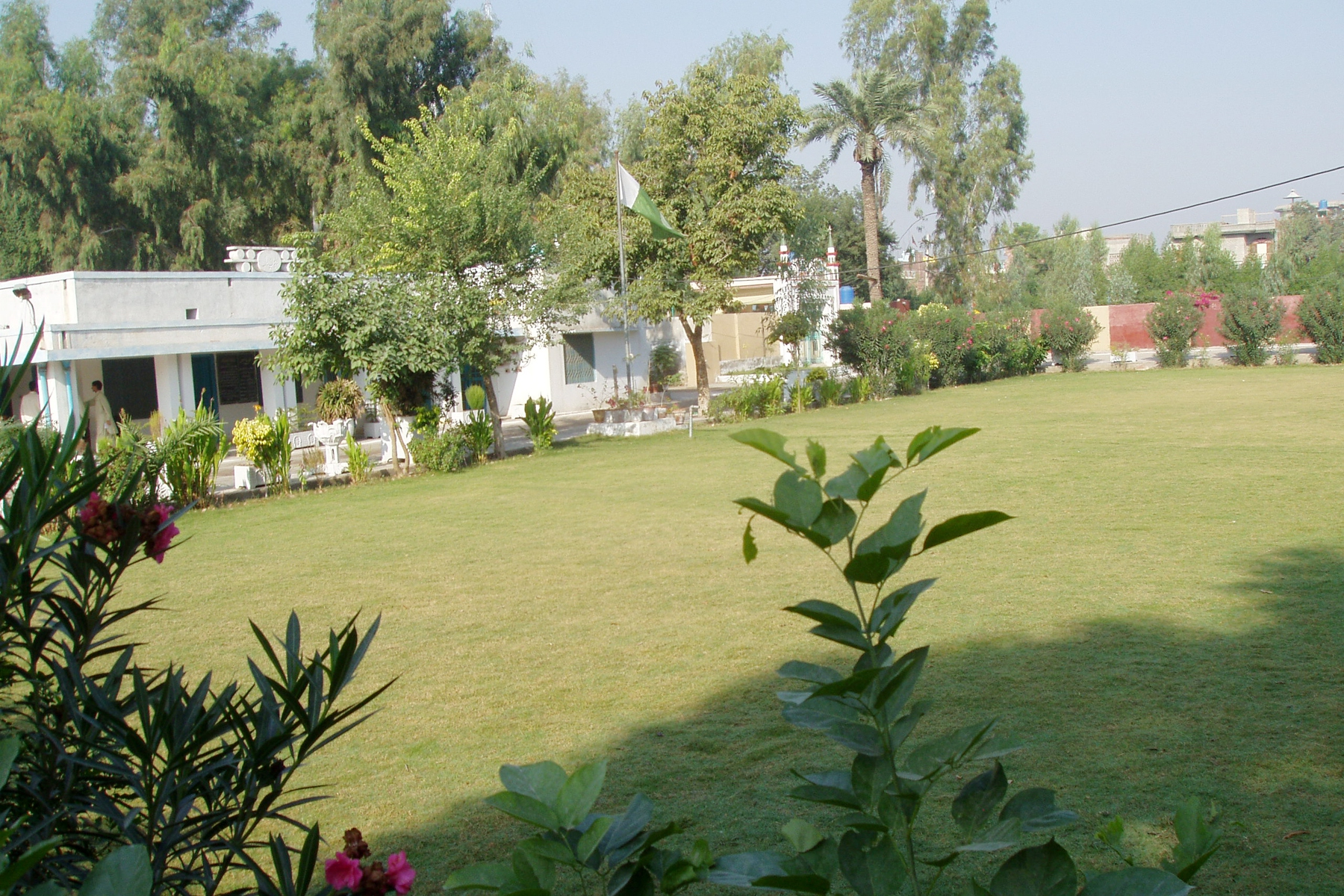

== Economy ==
Agriculture is one of the main sources of employment in it, the town has been a popular grain market for last 75 years as the town is located in a highly fertile area. The Rakh Branch canal passes near one side of the Safdarabad city to Sangla Hill and is an irrigation source. On the other hand, a large variety of shoes is prepared here and transported to different cities.

== Demographics ==
Population

Historical population
Year	Pop.	±%
1972	8,457	—
1981	12,609	+49.1%
1998	20,540	+62.9%
2017	27,739	+35.0%
2023	54,242	+95.5%

According to the 2023 census Safdarabad city has a population of 54,242.

== Famous Darbar (Mazarat) ==
There are many mazarat in the city and its surrounding areas. One of the most famous and holy Darbar (Shrine) is located in village Dhaban Khurd near Safdarabad city. Every year a grand Urs is held there, where hundreds of followers come to celebrate it. The celebrations of this Urs continues for two days. This is the village where Hazrat Syed Bahadur Ali Shah Gilani (Qadri, Noshai), father of Syed Ehsan Ali Bahadur spent many years and did guide the people toward spiritual knowledge. There are two graves in the shrine: One belongs to Baba Nazam Din Shah who is Gujjar by caste and the Khalifa of Syed Maoj Ali Shah of Village Jiwan Pur Gujjran Tehsil Garhshankar distt. Hoshiarpur India. While the second grave belongs to Hazrat Syed Karam Ali Shah Gilani died approximately 300 years ago. Syed Karam Ali Shah Gilani is the son of Hazrat Mubarak Shah Haqani whose holy shrine is in the city of Uch, Bahawalpur, Pakistan. A grand urs is observed here in Dhaban Khurd on May 25 and 26 every year. The holy shrine of Hazrat Syed Bahadur Ali Shah is situated in Makuana, Faisalabad. Syed Bahadur Ali Shah migrated from Jiwanpur Gujjran, Hoshiarpur, India in 1947. He died in 1998.

The Mela of Dera Hukam singh (Dera Rajputaan) is also very famous in local area which is held on February 27 and 28 every year.

== Education ==
There are many educational institutes in city Safdarabad.

- Namal academy Safdarabad near Post office
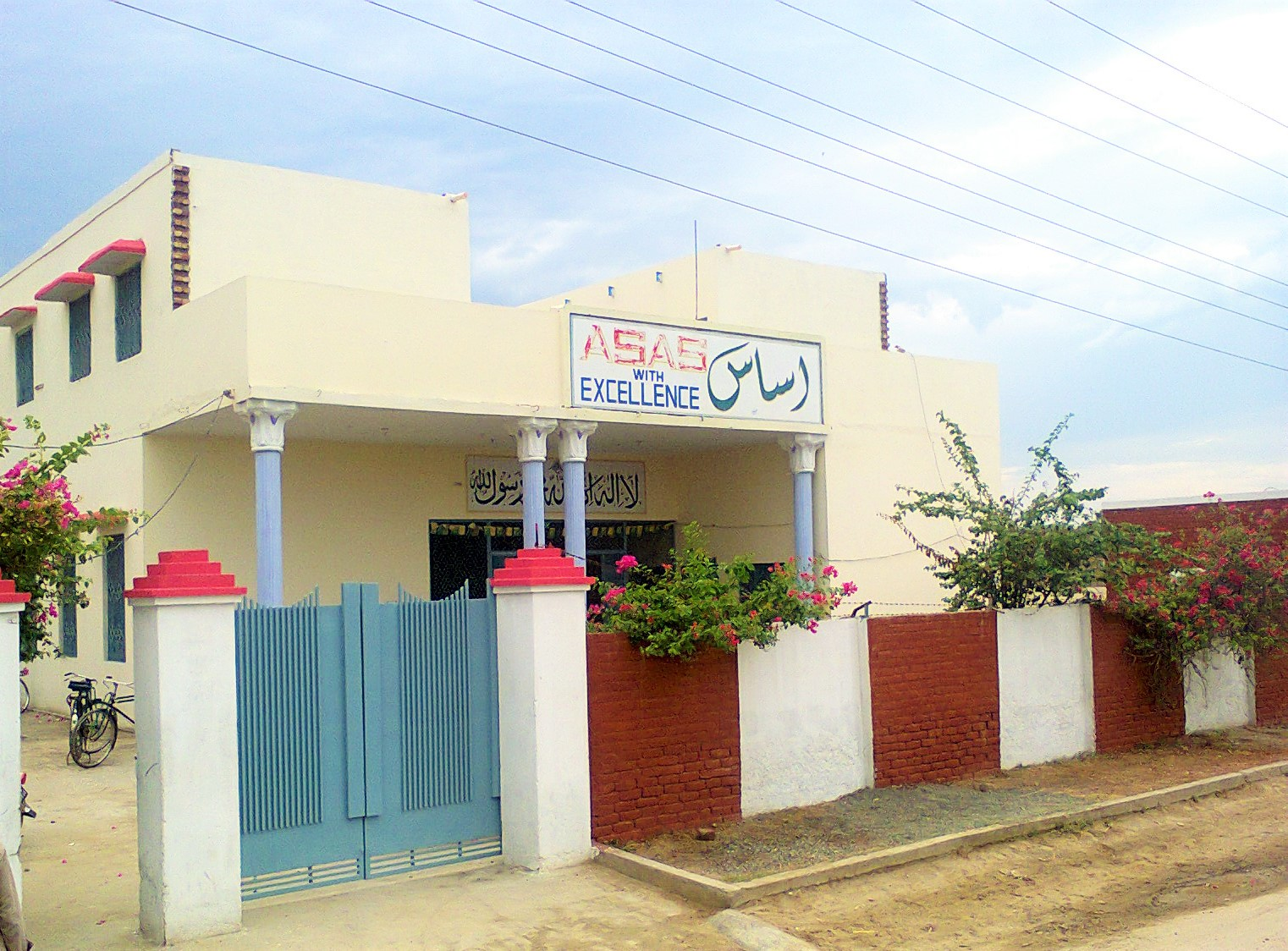
- Al-Rehman School of Alpha Studies (ASAS)
  Al-Rehman School of Alpha Studies-ASAS
- Ask Academy of Science
- City Star Model High School
- New Al-Rehman School of Applied Sciences (NEW ASAS)
- Afzal ideal public school
- Green Field Academy School
- Faran Leadership School
- Quaid-e-Azam Ideal Public School - QAIPS
- Eden Public School
- Govt. Girls Inter College
- Govt. Boys High School
- Govt. Vocational Training Institute for Girls
- Divisional Public School-DPS
- Punjab Public High School
- Safdarabad College of Commerce
- Gazali School System Safdar Abad
- Al-khidmat foundation Safdar Abad
- Child care foundation
- Siddique Public school
- Nawanpind high school
- Talha Irtsam Academy
- Qasim Public School (QPS) Nawankot
- Pakistan MOdel Scendry School
- Faran Leadership School
- Minhaj Ul Qur'aan Model Secondary School
- Wisdom Inn Public School Hameed Garden
- The Islamic Academy of Science and Technology
- Govt Technical Training Center (Male) Boutter Market Safdarabad
- Computer College (Show Market Safdarabad)

== Railway station ==
The central railway station is the main railway station of Safdarabad built during the British region around the nineteenth century. The station is used to take people to all parts of Pakistan from Karachi, Lahore, Rawalpindi, Quetta, Peshawar and many more cities and towns of Pakistan by rail.

== See also ==
- Sangla Hill
- Khanqah Dogran
- Nankana Sahib District
- Shahkot, Pakistan
