= Kanganpur =

- Town
- Location within Pakistan
- Coordinates: 30°56′56″N 73°44′36″E
- Country: Pakistan
- Province: Punjab
- District: Kasur

Government
  - Chairman: Hafiz Khalid Mehmood

Population (2018)
  - Total: 45,000
- Time zone: UTC+5 (PST)
- Calling code: 049

Kanganpur (Urdu: كنگن پُور), is a city in Kasur District in the Punjab province of Pakistan. It is part of Chunian Tehsil and is located at 30°46'0N 74°7'60E with an altitude of 177 metres (583 feet).

Kanganpur’s history dates back to 650 AD, when Raja Kambo of Chunian gifted the area to his daughter, Rani Kangan Bars, as part of her dowry. She named the region after herself. Although the area remained lightly populated for a period, it was later granted as a feudal estate by Mughal Emperor Zaheer Udin Babar to General Akbar Mughal, who began its development. One of the region’s most prominent historical landmarks is Rani Bagh, a fort-like structure constructed in 1650 AD by Emperor Shah Jahan as a leisure retreat for the family of Maharaja Ranjit Singh.

== Population Statistics ==
According to 2017 census, the population of Kanganpur town was 28,184, with 14,377 males and 13,800 females. The literacy rate at that time stood at 72.14 percent. According to the 2023 census, the town's population has increased to 38,568.

Kanganpur is famous for turmeric production. It is known as one of the biggest turmeric markets in Pakistan.
