= Jhang Branch =

Canal in Pakistan

Coordinates: 31°54′N 73°32′E

Jhang Branch Canal جھنگ برانچ ﻧﻬﺮ
- Interactive map of Jhang Branch Canal جھنگ برانچ ﻧﻬﺮ

Specifications
- Length: 32 miles (51 km)
- Status: Open

History
- Construction began: 1865

Geography
- Start point: Lower Chenab Canal, few yards away from the Darbar Peer Ali Murad Shah Bukhari
- End point: Nanak Sir
- Branch of: Lower Chenab Canal

The Jhang Branch Canal is a canal which originates from the Lower Chenab Canal.The 51-kilometer long canal mainly supplies water for irrigation of agriculture land in Jhang district of Punjab province in Pakistan.

In 1913-14, the Jhang Branch Canal was waterproofed to prevent flooding of the surrounding low-lying land.

The Lower Chenab Canal, Jhang Branch Canal, and Rangpur Canal form a massive irrigation system that waters hundreds of thousands of acres of land.

== See also ==
- Head Khanki
- Lower Chenab
- Gugera Branch Canal
- Marala Headworks
- Taunsa Barrage
- Indus River
- Rachna Doab
