= Gogera Branch Canal =

Canal in Punjab, Pakistan

Gugera Branch Canal گوگيره برانچ ﻧﻬﺮ
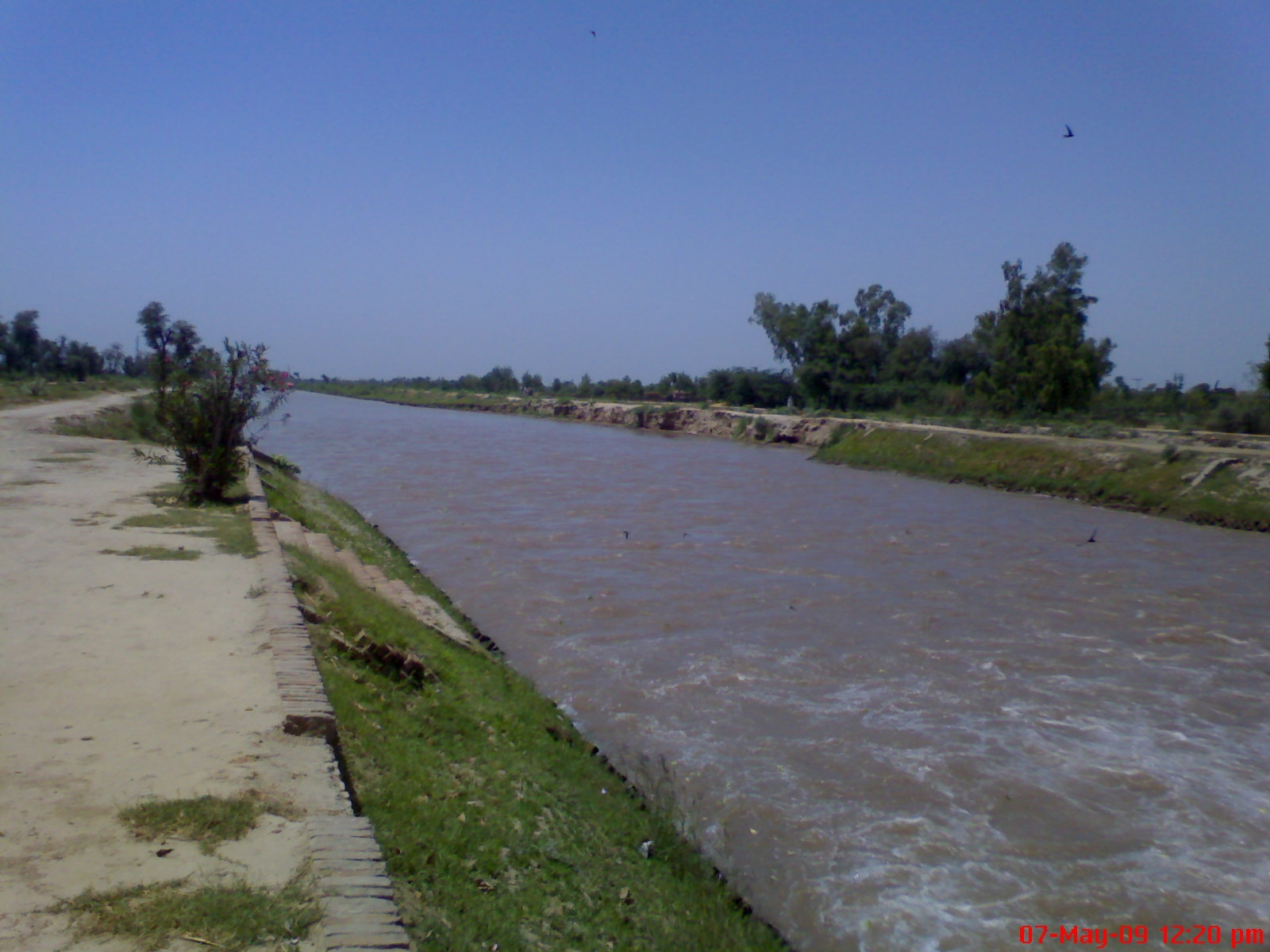
- Gogera Branch Canal at Stiana-Jaranwala Road, in Jaranwala tehsil
- Interactive map of Gugera Branch Canal گوگيره برانچ ﻧﻬﺮ

Specifications
- Length: 85 miles (137 km)
- Status: Open

History
- Construction began: 1865

Geography
- Start point: Lower Chenab Canal, few yards away from the Bachiana Village
- End point: Moongi Bungalow
- Branch of: Lower Chenab Canal

The Gugera Branch Canal is a canal in Pakistan originating from the Lower Chenab Canal. The canal supplies water mainly to the agriculture lands in Toba Tek Singh and Faisalabad districts of Pakistan's Punjab province. The 137-km long canal is named after Gogera, which was the administrative seat of the district when the canal was being developed in the late 19th century.

== See also ==
- Head Khanki
- Lower Chenab
- Jhang Branch
- Marala Headworks
- Taunsa Barrage
- Indus River
- Rachna Doab
- Gogera
