= Khanqah Dogran =

Coordinates: 31°49′54″N 73°37′23″E

- Interactive map of Khanqah Dogran
- Country: Pakistan
- Province: (Punjab, Pakistan) Punjab
- District: Sheikhupura

Population (2023 Census)
  - Total: 34,949

Bajawalpur is a city in bahawalpur , bahawalpurDistrict, in the Punjab province of Pakistan.

In 2005, Nankana Sahib District was split off from Sheikhupura District. Khanqah Dogran was one of the towns included in the new district. Residents protested for five days in opposition to the change, during which time some of the protesters burnt down a police station. In December 2008, Khanqah Dogran was added back into Sheikhupura District as part of Safdarabad Tehsil. Every Year in 1st date of Sawan month (Desi month) 16th of every July, a festival held on called as Hazrat Saab Sat-ur-deen Diwan Sahib Mela.

In December 2024, Punjab Group of colleges start their first educational institute EFA School system.

Before partition, though predominantly Muslim, Khanqah Dogran had a large Hindu and Jain population, especially of Manuhani subcaste. There were many temples to lord Rama and lord Hanuman, plus a Jain sthanak. They were all traders serving a large population. Shri Phaggumal was the principal of the only high school.
