= Lower Chenab Canal =

Canal in Punjab, Pakistan

- Interactive map of Lower Chenab Canal
- Location: Punjab
- Country: Pakistan
- Coordinates: 32°24′N 73°58′E

Specifications
- Status: Operational
- Navigation authority: Punjab Irrigation Department

History
- Construction began: 1892

Geography
- Start point: Chenab River at Khanki Headworks
- End point: Distributary network across the Rachna Doab

The Lower Chenab Canal is a canal in Pakistan. It was dug in 1892 and originates from Khanki Headworks, on the River Chenab in Gujranwala District. The Lower Chenab Canal irrigation system is one of the oldest irrigation systems in the Punjab province. It irrigates much of the Rechna Doab.

Some distributaries of Lower Chenab Canal are the Jhang Branch (mainly irrigating land in Jhang District), the Rakh Branch (mainly irrigating land in Hafizabad, Nankana Sahib and Faisalabad) and the Gugera Branch Canal (mainly watering land in Toba Tek Singh and Faisalabad districts).
