= Barki, Pakistan =

Barki
- Location within Pakistan
- Coordinates: 31°2′52″N 74°5′6″E
- Country: Pakistan
- Province: Punjab
- District(s): Lahore

Barki (Punjabi: بركى), or Burki, is a village near Jallo More Manhala , Lahore District of Punjab, Pakistan near the city of Lahore. It is located near the border with Punjab, India. Before the partition of India in 1947, it joined through Harikey Road. It is about 11 kilometers from Allama Iqbal International Airport. It is on the bank of Bambawali-Ravi-Bedian Canal. It gives its name to the Battle of Burki, which took place during the Indo-Pakistani War of 1965.

It is a centre of education for the border belt. Malik Meraj Khalid, former Caretaker Prime Minister of Pakistan and Speaker of the National Assembly of Pakistan, founded Anjuman Ikhwan-e-Islam in 1939 and later on Ikhwan school and college in the village. Later a separate degree college for boys was founded.

== In popular culture ==
This village is mentioned in the 1999 Punjabi movie Shaheed-e-Mohabbat Boota Singh, which is based on the story of Boota and Zainab Singh. Zainab's family migrated to Burki after the independence of Pakistan in 1947.

== See also ==
- Shaheed-E-Mohabbat
- Punjab region
- Punjab before 1947
- East Punjab
- West Punjab
- Punjabi language
- Manhala
- Padhana, Pakistan
- Mohalla Jutta
