= Rachna Doab =

Region of Punjab

Rachna Doab رچنا دوآب
- Natural region
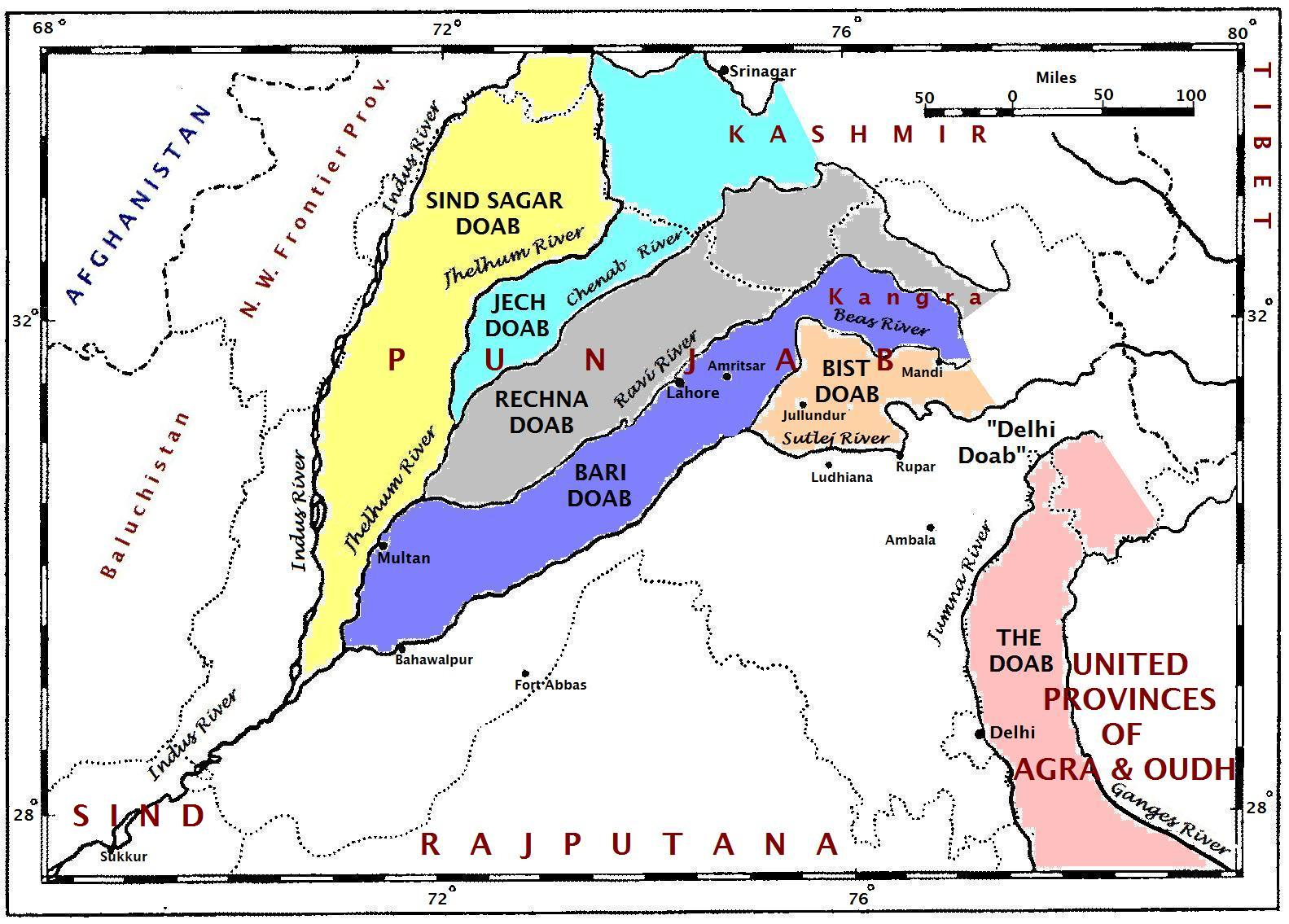
- A map of the Punjab region c. 1947 showing the different doabs
- Interactive map of Rachna Doab
- Country: Pakistan
- Province: Punjab

Area
  - Total: 30,177 km^{2} (11,651 sq mi)

Population (2023)
  - Total: 29,380,000
  - Density: 973.6/km^{2} (2,522/sq mi)
- Time zone: UTC+5

Rachna Doab (Punjabi: رچنا دوآب) or Rechna Doab, less commonly spelt as Rachena Doab, can be classified as one of the main regions of Punjab, Pakistan. The doab lies between the Ravi and Chenab rivers.

Punjab historically has been divided into regions based on its various rivers, since the name Punjab is based on its five main rivers. Rachna Doab is a Doab or tract of land in the Punjab region, encompassing all the area lying between the Ravi and Chenab Rivers, all the way from the Jammu Division till their confluence south of the town of Ahmadpur Sial in Punjab, Pakistan. It lies between 30° 35' and 32° 50' N. and 71° 50' and 75° 3' E. The name was given by the Mughal emperor Akbar, by combining the first syllables of the names of the two rivers. This is the most densely-populated region in Punjab, Pakistan, home to large cities such as Faisalabad, Sialkot and Gujranwala.

== Geography ==
The doab receives more rainfall than other parts of Punjab, Pakistan and is also irrigated by the Lower Chenab Canal. In the south of the doab, there are the cities of Khanewal and Jhang. The north-eastern part of the doab connects to the Grand Trunk Road. The upper area of the Rachna Doab is densely-populated.

== History ==
The Chenab Colony was established in this doab with Faisalabad (formerly Lyallpur) at its centre during the British-period.

== Districts ==
Rachna doab covers Narowal District, Sialkot District, Jammu District, Kathua District, Samba district, Udhampur district, Gujranwala District, Hafizabad District, Sheikhupura District, Nankana Sahib District, Faisalabad District, Toba Tek Singh District, Chiniot District (excluding Lalian Tehsil) and Jhang District (excluding Athara Hazari Tehsil and Ahmedpur Sial Tehsil).

== Major cities ==
Major cities of this Doab are:

- Narowal
- Sialkot
- Jammu
- Kathua
- Gujranwala
- Faisalabad
- Sheikhupura
- Narowal
- Toba Tek Singh
- Jhang
- Hafizabad
- Wazirabad

== See also ==
- Indus Sagar Doab
- Chaj Doab
- Bari Doab
