= Khanki Headworks =

Dam in Pakistan

Coordinates: 32°24′26″N 73°58′0″E

- Interactive map of Khanki Headworks
- Waterway: Chenab River
- Country: Pakistan
- Province: Punjab
- County: Gujranwala District
- Maintained by: Punjab Irrigation Department
- Operation: Manual / Hydraulic (older headworks manual shutters; new barrage gates electronically/hydraulically operated)
- First built: 1892
- Latest built: 2017 (new Khanki Barrage completed)
- Length: 4,384 ft (new barrage total length)
- Above sea level: ~730 feet at high floods (old headworks experienced water reaching 730 ft above sea level)
- Discharge capacity of old headworks ~800,000 cusecs; new barrage increased flood discharge ~37.5% to ≈31,000 m³/s

Khanki Headworks is a headworks situated on the River Chenab in Wazirabad District, Gujrat Division of the Punjab province of Pakistan. With its construction completed in 1889, it is one of the oldest headworks in Pakistan.

Khanki Headworks is also used to divert water to the Lower Chenab Canal, which originates from Khanki Headworks. Khanki controls water distribution over 12,000 km^{2} of agricultural lands by one main distributary, the Lower Chenab Canal, and 59 minor distributaries.

== History ==
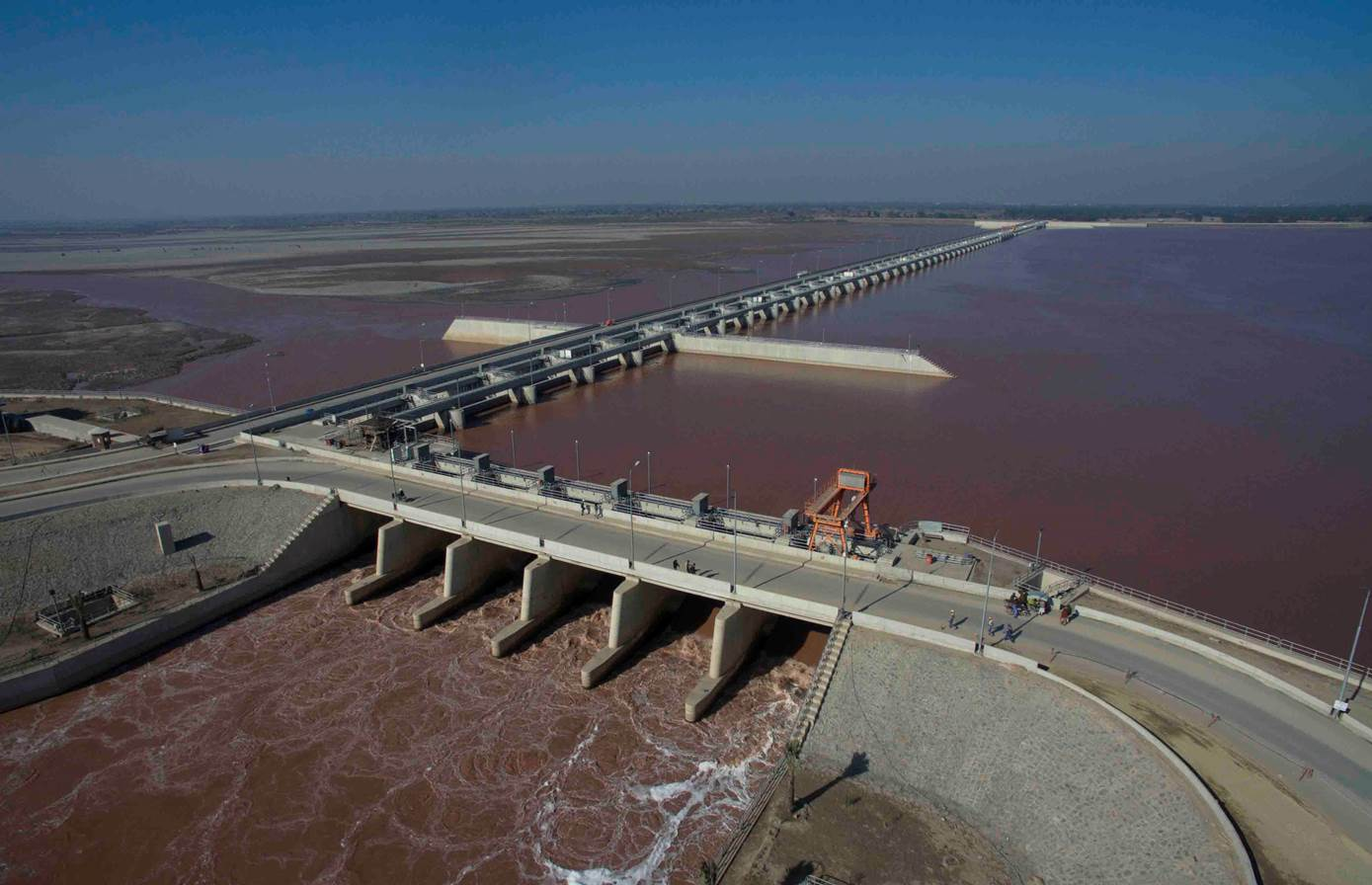
New Khanki Barrage during construction

The old "Head Khanki Barrage" was built from 1892 to 1898 on Chenab River by the British to convert 12,000 km^{2} of barren land into cotton and wheat fields. The barrage was built 16-km downstream of Alexandra Railway Bridge with stone and rubble masonry with a maximum capacity of 800,000 cusecs. The Lower Chenab Canal originates from the Barrage carrying about 11,600 cusecs of water. The weir originally was a shuttered type weir comprising 8 spans of 152 m each and was first one in Punjab which was built upon alluvial soil. The weir got repeatedly damaged in portions and had to be remodeled extensively during 1919-1920 and 1933–1935. Over time the structure showed some serious engineering defects so after detailed analysis and research, it was decided to build the whole barrage anew and demolish the previous one. The then Member of the National Assembly (NA-101 Justice Iftikhar Ahmed Cheema gave the idea of rebuilding the whole project for the betterment of farmers.The construction of new Khanki Barrage was completed in August 2017 but the barrage was formally handed over to the Punjab Irrigation Department in June 2019. The new Khanki barrage construction project cost Rs. 21.3 billion with 87 percent of the funding provided by the Asian Development Bank. New Khanki Barrage will divert 11,653 cusecs of sustainable irrigation supplies to the downstream Lower Chenab Canal. The irrigation distribution system has already been remodeled for additional flows.

The barrage will ensure sustainable irrigation of 3.03 million acres of fertile land in eight districts of central Punjab - Gujranwala, Hafizabad, Sheikhupura, Nankana Sahib, Faisalabad, Jhang, Chiniot and Toba Tek Singh. The project will benefit about 568,000 farming families and reduce flooding risks from once in 50 years to once in 100 years.

== Flooding hazards ==
Chenab River passes through Marala Headworks, Khanki Headworks, Qadirabad Headworks and Trimmu Barrage and there is river flooding hazards every year during the flooding season in all five major rivers of the old Punjab of British India on both sides of the border of India and Pakistan. Both countries monitor and watch the river water flow levels in their areas – especially closely during the flooding season.

== See also ==
- Chenab river dams and hydroelectric projects
- List of barrages and headworks in Pakistan
- List of dams and reservoirs in Pakistan
