= Lahore Division =

Coordinates: 31°10′N 74°30′E

Lahore Division لاہور ڈویژن
- Division
- Map of Lahore Division
- Country: Pakistan
- Province: (Punjab, Pakistan) Punjab
- Capital: Lahore
- Districts: Lahore; Kasur; Nankana Sahib; Sheikhupura

Government
  - Type: Divisional Administration
  - Commissioner: Muhammad Ali Randhawa (PAS)
  - Capital City Police Officer (CCPO): Bilal Siddiqui Kamyana (PSP)

Area
  - Division: 11,727 km^{2} (4,528 sq mi)

Population (2023)
  - Division: 22,772,710
  - Density: 1,941.9/km^{2} (5,029.5/sq mi)
  - Urban: 16,122,198 (70.80%)
  - Rural: 6,650,512

Literacy
  - Literacy rate: Total: (73.63%); Male: (76.60%); Female: (70.35%)
- National Assembly Seats (2024): Total (24): PMLN (16); PTI (6); IPP (2)
- Provincial Assembly Seats (2024): Total (53): PMLN (36); PTI (16); IPP (1)
- Website: lahoredivision.punjab.gov.pk

Lahore Division is an administrative division of Punjab Province, Pakistan. It comprises four Districts - Kasur, Lahore, Nankana Sahib and Sheikhupura. The Lahore Division is commanded by a Commissioner to manage the division. Under the Commissioner there are four Additional Commissioners. For each district there is a Deputy Commissioner. Under the reforms of 2000, this tier of government was abolished, but in 2008 divisions were restored.

== History ==
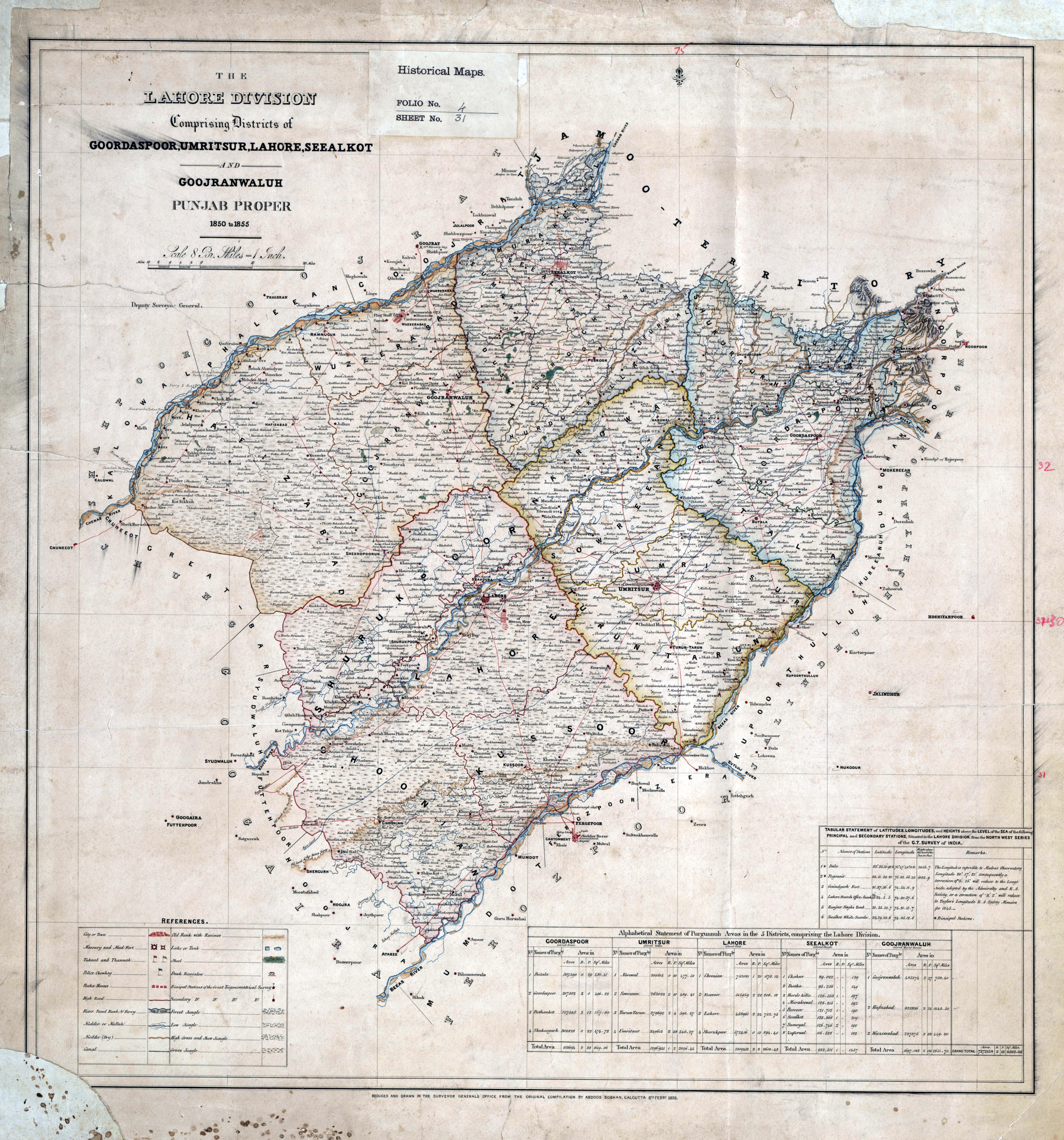
Map of the Lahore Division comprising the Districts of Gurdaspur, Amritsar, Lahore, Sialkot, and Gujranwala, surveyed in 1850–55. Reduced and drawn by Abdoos Sobhan, 1858.

Lahore Division was originally an administrative division of the Punjab Province of British India. It extended along the right bank of the Sutlej River from the Himalaya to Multan division, and comprised the six districts of Sialkot, Gujranwala, Lahore, Amritsar, Gurdaspur and Gujrat. The total area of the division was 44,430 km^{2} (17,154 sq mi) and the population according to the 1901 census of India was 5,598,463. The commissioner for the division also exercised political control over the hill state of Chamba.

The Commissioner's headquarters were at Lahore and Dalhousie.The total population of the Division increased from 4,696,636 in 1881 to 5,321,535 in 1891, and 5,598,463 in 1901. The total area was 44,430 square kilometres (17,154 sq mi), and the density of population was 326 persons per square mile, compared with 208 for British territory in the Province as a whole. In 1901 Muslims numbered 3,332,175, or 60 percent of the total; while other religions included Hindus, 1,567,402; Sikhs, 661,320; Jains, 5,5,07; Buddhists, 6; Parsis, 228; and Christians, 31,815, of whom 25,248 were natives.

The division contained six districts:

District	Area (square miles)	Population (1901 census figures)	Land revenue and cesses (thousands of rupees).
Gujrat	4,771	497,706	6,90
Lahore	3,704	1,162,109	12,55
Amritsar	1,601	1,023,828	14,54
Gurdaspur	1,889	940,334	17,72
Sialkot	1,991	1,083,909	17,27
Gujranwala	3,198	890,557	12,89
Total	17,154	5,598,463	81,87

Gurdaspur included a few square miles of mountainous country, enclosing the hill station of Dalhousie (highest, point, 7,687 feet); but otherwise the Division was flat. It contained 9,869 villages and 41 towns, of which the largest are Lahore (population, 202,964, including cantonment), Amristar(162,429), Sialkot (57,956), Gujranwala (29,224), Batala (27,365), and Gujrat (22,022). In commercial importance Lahore and Amritsar dwarfed all other towns in the Division, but Sialkot and Batala were considerably more than local centres. Besides the administrative charge of six British Districts, the Commissioner of Lahore had political control over the Native State of Chamba, which had an area of 8,330 square kilometres (3,216 sq mi) and a population (1901) of 127,834.

== Demographics ==
=== Population ===
Historical population
Year	Pop.	±% p.a.
1951	N/A	—
1961	N/A	—
1972	N/A	—
1981	N/A	—
1998	8,694,620	—
2017	19,581,281	+4.37%
2023	22,772,710	+2.55%

According to the 2023 census, Lahore division had a population of 22,772,710 roughly equal to the nation of Sri Lanka or the US state of Florida.

== List of the Districts ==
#	District	Headquarter	Area (km²)	Pop. (2023)	Density (ppl/km²) (2023)	Lit. rate (2023)
1	Lahore	Lahore	1,772	13,004,135	7,336.6	79.62%
2	Kasur	Kasur	3,995	4,084,286	1,021.4	62.85%
3	Nankana Sahib	Nankana Sahib	2,216	1,634,871	737.0	63.12%
4	Sheikhupura	Sheikhupura	3,744	4,049,418	1,080.3	68.88%

== List of the Tehsils ==
#	Tehsil	Area (km²)	Pop. (2023)	Density (ppl/km²) (2023)	Lit. rate (2023)	Districts
1	Chunian	1,212	979,746	808.37	60.64%	Kasur District
2	Kasur	1,493	1,603,658	1,074.12	63.63%	Kasur District
3	Kot Radha Kishan	398	424,875	1,067.53	64.66%	Kasur District
4	Pattoki	892	1,076,007	1,206.29	62.98%	Kasur District
5	Lahore Cantonment	466	1,885,098	4,045.27	81.01%	Lahore District
6	Lahore City	214	4,123,354	19,268.01	80.36%	Lahore District
7	Model Town	353	3,244,906	9,192.37	78.94%	Lahore District
8	Raiwind	467	1,080,637	2,314.00	72.35%	Lahore District
9	Shalimar	272	2,670,140	9,816.69	81.21%	Lahore District
10	Sangla Hill	223	269,993	1,210.73	72.08%	Nankana Sahib District
11	Nankana Sahib	1,662	1,065,063	640.83	59.02%	Nankana Sahib District
12	Shah Kot	331	299,815	905.79	69.28%	Nankana Sahib District
13	Muridke	1,028	721,192	701.55	69.10%	Sheikhupura District
14	Ferozewala	511	997,246	1,951.56	66.55%	Sheikhupura District
15	Safdarabad	461	320,851	695.99	67.55 %	Sheikhupura District
16	Sheikhupura	1,369	1,780,837	1,300.83	70.72%	Sheikhupura District
17	Sharak Pur	375	229,292	611.45	65.05%	Sheikhupura District

== Independence ==
With the independence of India and Pakistan in 1947, Lahore Division was divided among the two countries. with the eastern half becoming Amritsar District.

== Constituencies ==
Provincial Assembly Constituency	National Assembly Constituency	District
PP-132 Nankana Sahib-I	NA-111 Nankana Sahib-I	Nankana Sahib
PP-133 Nankana Sahib-II	NA-111 Nankana Sahib-I	Nankana Sahib
PP-134 Nankana Sahib-III	NA-112 Nankana Sahib-II	Nankana Sahib
PP-135 Nankana Sahib-IV	NA-112 Nankana Sahib-II	Nankana Sahib
PP-136 Sheikhupura-I	NA-113 Sheikhupura-I	Sheikhupura
PP-137 Sheikhupura-II	NA-113 Sheikhupura-I	Sheikhupura
PP-138 Sheikhupura-III	NA-114 Sheikhupura-II	Sheikhupura
PP-139 Sheikhupura-IV	NA-114 Sheikhupura-II	Sheikhupura
PP-140 Sheikhupura-V	NA-114 Sheikhupura-II	Sheikhupura
PP-141 Sheikhupura-VI	NA-115 Sheikhupura-III	Sheikhupura
PP-142 Sheikhupura-VII	NA-115 Sheikhupura-III	Sheikhupura
PP-143 Sheikhupura-VIII	NA-116 Sheikhupura-IV	Sheikhupura
PP-144 Sheikhupura-IX	NA-116 Sheikhupura-IV	Sheikhupura
PP-145 Lahore-I	NA-117 Lahore-I	Lahore
PP-146 Lahore-II	NA-117 Lahore-I	Lahore
PP-147 Lahore-III	NA-118 Lahore-II	Lahore
PP-148 Lahore-IV	NA-118 Lahore-II	Lahore
PP-149 Lahore-V	NA-119 Lahore-III	Lahore
PP-150 Lahore-VI	NA-119 Lahore-III	Lahore
PP-151 Lahore-VII	NA-120 Lahore-IV	Lahore
PP-154 Lahore-X	NA-120 Lahore-IV	Lahore
PP-152 Lahore-VIII	NA-121 Lahore-V	Lahore
PP-153 Lahore-IX	NA-121 Lahore-V	Lahore
PP-155 Lahore-XI	NA-122 Lahore-VI	Lahore
PP-156 Lahore-XII	NA-122 Lahore-VI	Lahore
PP-157 Lahore-XIII	NA-122 Lahore-VI	Lahore
PP-158 Lahore-XIV	NA-123 Lahore-VII	Lahore
PP-164 Lahore-XX	NA-123 Lahore-VII	Lahore
PP-159 Lahore-XV	NA-124 Lahore-VIII	Lahore
PP-163 Lahore-XIX	NA-124 Lahore-VIII	Lahore
PP-165 Lahore-XXI	NA-125 Lahore-IX	Lahore
PP-166 Lahore-XXII	NA-125 Lahore-IX	Lahore
PP-167 Lahore-XXIII	NA-126 Lahore-X	Lahore
PP-168 Lahore-XXIV	NA-126 Lahore-X	Lahore
PP-160 Lahore-XVI	NA-127 Lahore-XI	Lahore
PP-162 Lahore-XVIII	NA-127 Lahore-XI	Lahore
PP-161 Lahore-XVII	NA-128 Lahore-XII	Lahore
PP-169 Lahore-XXV	NA-128 Lahore-XII	Lahore
PP-170 Lahore-XXVI	NA-128 Lahore-XII	Lahore
PP-171 Lahore-XXVII	NA-129 Lahore-XIII	Lahore
PP-172 Lahore-XXVIII	NA-129 Lahore-XIII	Lahore
PP-173 Lahore-XXIX	NA-130 Lahore-XIV	Lahore
PP-174 Lahore-XXX	NA-130 Lahore-XIV	Lahore
PP-176 Kasur-II	NA-131 Kasur-I	Kasur
PP-177 Kasur-III	NA-131 Kasur-I	Kasur
PP-178 Kasur-IV	NA-131 Kasur-I	Kasur
PP-175 Kasur-I	NA-132 Kasur-II	Kasur
PP-179 Kasur-V	NA-132 Kasur-II	Kasur
PP-180 Kasur-VI	NA-133 Kasur-III	Kasur
PP-181 Kasur-VII	NA-133 Kasur-III	Kasur
PP-182 Kasur-VIII	NA-134 Kasur-IV	Kasur
PP-183 Kasur-IX	NA-134 Kasur-IV	Kasur
PP-184 Kasur-X	NA-134 Kasur-IV	Kasur

== See also ==
- Divisions of Pakistan
  - Divisions of Punjab, Pakistan
  - Divisions of Khyber Pakhtunkhwa
  - Divisions of Balochistan
  - Divisions of Sindh
- Districts of Pakistan
  - Districts of Punjab, Pakistan
  - Districts of Khyber Pakhtunkhwa
  - Districts of Balochistan
  - Districts of Sindh
