= Kot Chandi =

Chandi Kot چاندی کوٹ
- Village
- Location in Pakistan Chandi Kot (Pakistan)
- Coordinates: 31.5467°N 73.7994°E
- Country: Pakistan
- Province: Punjab
- District: Nankana Sahib
- Tehsils: Nankana Sahib Tehsil
- Union Councils: UC Chak No.576/GB
- Postal Code: 39181

Government
  - Famous Personality: چوہدری بلال احمد ورک
- Elevation: 194 m (636 ft)

Population (2019)
  - Total: 3,867
- Time zone: UTC+5 (PST)
- Calling code: 0562

Chandi Kot also known as Kot Shah Mohammad is a village situated in Nankana Sahib District in the Punjab province of Pakistan. It is about 20 kilometres (12 mi) north of Nankana Sahib and 30 km southeast of Sheikhupura. The newly constructed Karachi-Lahore Motorway has reduced the city travel time from Lahore greatly.

Before the establishment of Nankana Sahib as a district the village was a part of Sheikhupura district. The village falls under constituency NA-111 Nankana Sahib-I of the National Assembly of Pakistan.

== Administration ==
Chandi Kot is administrated in Chak No.576/GB Union Council which is a sub-city of Nankana SahibTehsil Administration

=== Masjid ===
Jamia Masjid Hassan bin Sabit Ahlehadith Chandi Kot جامع مسجد حسان بن ثابت اہلحدیث چاندی کوٹ

=== Nearby ===
North Star Textiles
