= NA-112 Nankana Sahib-II =

Constituency of the National Assembly of Pakistan

- Constituency for the National Assembly of Pakistan
- Region: Nankana Sahib Tehsil (partly) including Nankana Sahib City of Nankana Sahib District
- Electorate: 463,718

Current constituency
- Party: Pakistan Muslim League (N)
- Member: Shizra Mansab Ali Khan
- Created from: NA-132 (Sheikhupura-II-cum-Nankana Sahib); NA-136 (Nankana Sahib-II-cum-Sheikhupura); NA-137 (Nankana Sahib-III)

NA-112 Nankana Sahib-II (این اے-112، ننکانہ صاحب-٢) is a constituency for the National Assembly of Pakistan located in the Nankana Sahib District of Punjab. It primarily encompasses parts of the Nankana Sahib Tehsil, including the city of Nankana Sahib. The constituency was redefined during the 2018 delimitation process, acquiring areas from the former NA-132, NA-136, and NA-137 constituencies. It is currently represented by Shizra Mansab Ali Khan of the Pakistan Muslim League (N), who won the seat in the 2024 general election.

== Area ==
During the delimitation of 2018, NA-118 Nankana Sahib-II acquired areas from three former constituencies namely NA-132 (Sheikhupura-II-cum-Nankana Sahib), NA-136 (Nankana Sahib-II-cum-Sheikhupura), and NA-137 (Nankana Sahib-III), the areas of Nankana Sahib District which are part of this constituency are listed below alongside the former constituency name from which they were acquired:

Areas acquired from NA-132 (Sheikhupura-II-cum-Nankana Sahib)

- Following areas of Nankana Sahib Tehsil
  - Jawahar Pur (excluding Mauza Madhodas)
  - Mirza Pur

Areas acquired from NA-136 Nankana Sahib-II-cum-Sheikhupura

- Following areas of Nankana Sahib Tehsil
  - Mangtanwala
  - Rehanwala (excluding Mirzapur and Jawahar Pur except Mauza Madhodas)
  - Asalapar
  - Jalal Nau
  - Chak No. 589/GB
  - Bulaqi
  - Murtaza (excluding Mauza Naranwala)

Areas acquired from NA-137 Nankana Sahib-III

- Nankana Sahib Municipal Corporation
- Rest of Nankana Sahib Tehsil (excluding what is mentioned above and the areas included in NA-117 (Nankana Sahib-I) such as Mohlan, Warburton, Municipal Committee Warburton, Chak No. 370/GB, Chak No. 572/GB, and Chak No. 574/GB)

== Members of Parliament ==
=== 2018–2023: NA-118 Nankana Sahib-II ===
Election	Member	Party
2018	Ijaz Ahmed Shah	Pakistan Tehreek-e-Insaf

=== 2024–present: NA-112 Nankana Sahib-II ===
Election	Member	Party
2024	Shizra Mansab Ali Khan	PML(N)

== Election 2002 ==
General elections were held on 10 October 2002. Rai Mansab Ali Khan of PML-Q won by 61,506 votes.

General election 2002: NA-137 Nankana Sahib-III
Party	Candidate	Votes	%	±%
PML(Q)	Rai Mansab Ali Khan	61,506	49.09	
PPP	Muhammad Nisar Ahmed Khan	53,783	42.93	
PML(N)	Rai Muhammad Hayat Kharal	6,442	5.14	
Independent	Rai Bashir Ahmad Khan Bhatti	2,660	2.12	
Others	Others (three candidates)	901	0.72	
Turnout		128,789	46.05	
Total valid votes		125,292	97.29	
Rejected ballots		3,497	2.71	
Majority		7,723	6.16	
Registered electors		279,668		

== Election 2008 ==
General elections were held on 18 February 2008. Saeed Ahmed Zafar an independent candidate won by 54,732 votes.

General election 2008: NA-137 Nankana Sahib-III
Party	Candidate	Votes	%	±%
Independent	Saeed Ahmed Zafar	54,732	43.80	
PML(N)	Rai Mansab Ali Khan	44,745	35.81	
PPP	Muhammad Nisar Ahmed Khan	24,829	19.87	
Others	Others (five candidates)	659	0.52	
Turnout		130,417	55.68	
Total valid votes		124,965	95.82	
Rejected ballots		5,452	4.18	
Majority		9,987	7.99	
Registered electors		234,225		
Independent gain from PML(Q)				

== Election 2013 ==
General elections were held on 11 May 2013. Rai Mansab Ali Khan of PML-N won by 61,329 votes and became the member of National Assembly.

General election 2013: NA-137 Nankana Sahib-III
Party	Candidate	Votes	%	±%
PML(N)	Rai Mansab Ali Khan	61,329	36.28	
Independent	Ijaz Ahmed Shah	56,050	33.15	
Independent	Saeed Ahmed Zafar	22,967	13.58	
PPP	Shahjahan Ahmad Bhatti	12,007	7.10	
Others	Others (ten candidates)	16,712	9.89	
Turnout		175,706	61.12	
Total valid votes		169,065	96.22	
Rejected ballots		6,641	3.78	
Majority		5,279	3.13	
Registered electors		287,484		
PML(N) gain from Independent				

== By-Election 2015 ==
By-Election 2015: NA-137 Nankana Sahib-III
Party	Candidate	Votes	%	±%
PML(N)	Dr. Shizra Manseb Ali Khan Kharral	80,241	56.80	
Independent	Ijaz Ahmed Shah	41,944	29.69	
PPP	Shah Jahan Ahmad Khan Bhatti	16,507	11.69	
Others	Others (seven candidates)	2,567	1.82	
Turnout		143,358	49.83	
Total valid votes		141,259	98.54	
Rejected ballots		2,099	1.46	
Majority		38,297	27.11	
Registered electors		287,719		
PML(N) hold				

== Election 2018 ==
General elections were held on 25 July 2018.

General election 2018: NA-118 Nankana Sahib-II
Party	Candidate	Votes	%	±%
PTI	Ijaz Ahmed Shah	63,918	30.60	
PML(N)	Shizra Mansab Ali Khan	61,395	29.39	
TLP	Syed Afzaal Hussain Rizvi	49,419	23.66	
PPP	Shahjahan Ahmad Bhatti	18,739	8.97	
Others	Others (six candidates)	15,432	7.39	
Turnout		218,302	58.73	
Total valid votes		208,903	95.69	
Rejected ballots		9,399	4.31	
Majority		2,523	1.21	
Registered electors		371,715		
PTI gain from PML(N)				

== By-election 2022 ==
A by-election was held on 16 October 2022 due to the resignation of Ijaz Shah, the previous MNA from this seat.

By-election 2022: NA-118 Nankana Sahib-II
Party	Candidate	Votes	%	±%
PTI	Imran Khan	90,180	45.97	▲15.37
PML(N)	Shizra Mansab Ali Khan	78,024	39.77	▲10.38
TLP	Syed Afzaal Hussain Rizvi	24,630	12.55	▼11.11
Others	Others (five candidates)	3,353	1.71	
Turnout		198,790	44.10	▼14.63
Rejected ballots		2,603	1.31	▼3.00
Majority		12,156	6.20	▲4.99
Registered electors		450,810		
PTI hold				

== Election 2024 ==
General elections were held on 8 February 2024. Shezra Mansab Ali Khan won the election with 105,656 votes.

General election 2024: NA-112 Nankana Sahib-II
Party	Candidate	Votes	%	±%
PML(N)	Shezra Mansab Ali Khan	105,656	43.22	▲3.45
PTI	Ijaz Ahmed Shah (Note: Filed nomination papers as PTI candidate but ECP allowed him to run as an independent)	93,329	38.18	▼7.79
TLP	Abrar Ahmad	20,895	8.55	▼4.00
PPP	Shahjahan Ahmad Bhatti	13,452	5.50	
Others	Others (ten candidates)	11,142	4.56	
Turnout		252,507	54.45	▲10.35
Total valid votes		244,474	96.82	
Rejected ballots		8,033	3.18	
Majority		12,327	5.04	▲4.99
Registered electors		463,718		
PML(N) gain from PTI				

== See also ==
- NA-111 Nankana Sahib-I
- NA-113 Sheikhupura-I
