= PP-134 Nankana Sahib-III =

Constituency of the Provincial Assembly of Punjab, Pakistan

- Constituency for the Provincial Assembly of Punjab
- Region: Nankana Sahib Tehsil (partly) including Nankana Sahib city and Mandi Faizabad town of Nankana Sahib District

Current constituency
- Created from: PP-173 Nankana Sahib-IV (2002-2018); PP-133 Nankana Sahib-III (2018-2023)

PP-134 Nankana Sahib-III (پی پی-134، ننكانہ صاحِب-3) is a Constituency of Provincial Assembly of Punjab.

== General elections 2024 ==
Provincial election 2024: PP-134 Nankana Sahib-III
Party	Candidate	Votes	%	±%
PML(N)	Muhammad Kashif	39,504	32.18	
Independent	Sohail Manzoor (Note: Filed nomination papers as PTI candidate but ECP allowed him to run as an Independent)	35,683	29.07	
PPP	Syed Ibrar Hussain Shah	33,920	27.63	
TLP	Ghulam Qadir Alvi	10,883	8.87	
Others	Others (nine candidates)	2,758	2.25	
Turnout		126,143	55.79	
Total valid votes		122,748	97.31	
Rejected ballots		3,395	2.69	
Majority		3,821	3.11	
Registered electors		226,107		
hold				

== General elections 2018 ==
Provincial election 2018: PP-133 Nankana Sahib-III
Party	Candidate	Votes	%	±%
PML(N)	Muhammad Kashif	26,458	25.62	
PTI	Shahid Manzoor Gill	24,169	23.40	
PPP	Syed Abrar Hussain Shah	22,890	22.17	
TLP	Muhammad Asghar	10,766	10.43	
Independent	Malik Zulqarnain Dogar	9,411	9.11	
Independent	Syed Zahid Muzafar Shah	1,871	1.81	
Independent	Sohail Manzoor	1,418	1.37	
AAT	Abdullah Rafiq	1,403	1.36	
Independent	Ghulam Qadir Alvi	1,213	1.18	
Others	Others (fourteen candidates)	3,584	3.55	
Turnout		107,218	59.05	
Total valid votes		103,273	96.32	
Rejected ballots		3,945	3.68	
Majority		2,289	2.22	
Registered electors		181,562		

== General elections 2013 ==
Provincial election 2013: PP-173 Nankana Sahib-IV
Party	Candidate	Votes	%	±%
PML(N)	Muhammad Kashif	30,819	37.67	
PPP	Syed Abrar Hussain Shah	22,404	27.38	
Independent	Rana Muhammad Zulqarnain Khan	9,354	11.43	
PTI	Abdul Khaliq	6,958	8.50	
Independent	Ali Amir Joyia	6,442	7.87	
Independent	Syed Zahid Muzaffar Shah	2,504	3.06	
Independent	Nasrummin Allah Javaid	1,063	1.30	
Others	Others (fifteen candidates)	2,268	2.77	
Turnout		84,569	61.00	
Total valid votes		81,812	96.74	
Rejected ballots		2,757	3.26	
Majority		8,415	10.29	
Registered electors		138,635		

== General elections 2008 ==
Contesting candidates	Party affiliation	Votes polled

== See also ==
- PP-133 Nankana Sahib-II
- PP-135 Nankana Sahib-IV
