= PP-135 Nankana Sahib-IV =

Constituency of the Provincial Assembly of Punjab, Pakistan

- Constituency for the Provincial Assembly of Punjab
- Region: Nankana Sahib Tehsil (partly) including More Khunda, Syedwala and Bucheki towns of Nankana Sahib District

Current constituency
- Created from: PP-174 Nankana Sahib-V (2002-2018); PP-134 Nankana Sahib-IV (2018-2023)

PP-135 Nankana Sahib-IV (پی پی-135، ننكانہ صاحِب-4) is a Constituency of Provincial Assembly of Punjab.

== General elections 2024 ==
Provincial election 2024: PP-135 Nankana Sahib-IV
Party	Candidate	Votes	%	±%
PML(N)	Agha Ali Haider	56,809	46.64	
Independent	Jamil Hassan Khan (Note: Filed nomination papers as PTI candidate but ECP allowed him to run as an Independent)	43,718	35.89	
TLP	Rana Mujeeb Afzal Khan	9,343	7.67	
Independent	Rana Tahseen Ikhlaq	6,322	5.19	
PPP	Rai Walayat Khan	2,836	2.33	
Others	Others (sixteen candidates)	2,773	2.28	
Turnout		126,320	53.16	
Total valid votes		121,801	96.42	
Rejected ballots		4,519	3.58	
Majority		13,091	10.75	
Registered electors		237,611		
hold				

== General elections 2018 ==
Provincial election 2018: PP-134 Nankana Sahib-IV
Party	Candidate	Votes	%	±%
PML(N)	Agha Ali Haider	28,478	26.52	
PTI	Rai Muhammad Aslam Khan	26,240	24.43	
Independent	Jameel Hassan Khan	18,786	17.49	
TLP	Asghar Ali	15,465	14.40	
Independent	Rana Muhammad Zulqarnain Khan	11,474	10.68	
PPP	Sheikh Muhammad Iqbal Babar	1,991	1.85	
Independent	Allah Tawakal	1,437	1.34	
AAT	Rana Muhammad Arif	1,422	1.32	
Others	Others (eight candidates)	2,110	1.97	
Turnout		111,901	58.85	
Total valid votes		108,088	96.59	
Rejected ballots		3,813	3.41	
Majority		2,238	2.09	
Registered electors		190,153		

== General elections 2013 ==
Provincial election 2013: PP-174 Nankana Sahib-V
Party	Candidate	Votes	%	±%
PML(N)	Jamil Hassan Khan	27,390	34.21	
Independent	Agha Ali Haider	19,099	23.86	
Independent	Rai Muhammad Aslam Khan	16,840	21.03	
Independent	Asghar Ali	6,591	8.23	
PTI	Kashif Mehmood Dogar	4.36	4.36	
PPP	Syed Azhar-Ul-Hassan	3,244	4.05	
Independent	Muhammad Sher	1,760	2.20	
Others	Others (eleven candidates)	1,648	2.06	
Turnout		84,222	61.25	
Total valid votes		80,061	95.06	
Rejected ballots		4,161	4.94	
Majority		8,291	10.35	
Registered electors		137,506		

== General elections 2008 ==
Contesting candidates	Party affiliation	Votes polled

== See also ==
- PP-134 Nankana Sahib-III
- PP-136 Sheikhupura-I
