= NA-136 (Nankana Sahib-II-cum-Sheikhupura) =

Constituency of the National Assembly of Pakistan

Constituency NA-136 (Sheikhupura-VI)
- Former constituency for the National Assembly of Pakistan
- Region: Sheikhupura District

Former constituency
- Created: 2002
- Abolished: 2018
- Replaced by: NA-117 (Nankana Sahib-I); NA-118 (Nankana Sahib-II)

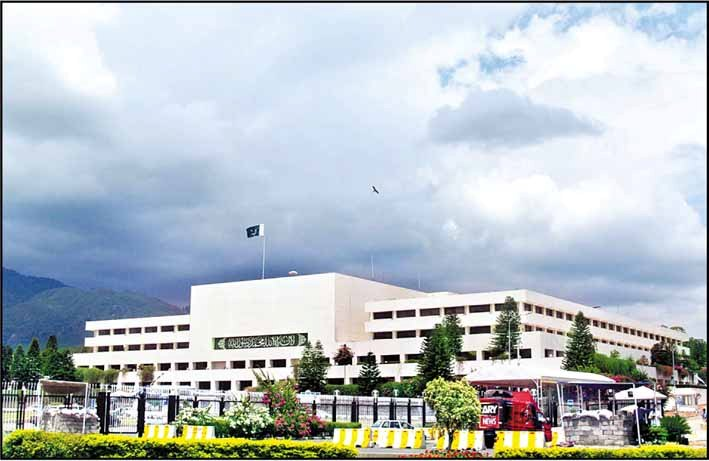
Parliament House, Islamabad

Constituency NA-136 (Sheikhupura-VI) (Urdu: این اے-۱۳۶، شيخوپوره-۶) was a constituency for the National Assembly of Pakistan. It was divided between areas of Nankana Sahib Tehsil and Sheikhupura Tehsil; with the major chunk being of Nankana Sahib areas. After elevation of Nankana Sahib to district level in 2005, the constituency started being referred to as "NA-136 Nankana Sahib-cum-Sheikhupura". With the 2018 delimitations, the constituency was abolished and the overlapping of the two districts was ended. Now the areas of Nankana Sahib that were in this constituency, including the towns of Warburton and Tashpur, and the Qanungo Halqas of Mangtanwala and Rahanwala, are divided between NA-117 and NA-116. Meanwhile, the Sheikhupura section, which included the town of Manawala and the Qanungo Halqa of Bahrianwala are included in NA-122 and NA-120 respectively.

== Election 2002 ==
General elections were held on 10 Oct 2002. Chaudhry Bilal Ahmed Virk of PML-Q won by 63,167 votes.

General election 2002: NA-136 Sheikhupura-VI
Party	Candidate	Votes	%	±%
PML(Q)	Bilal Ahmad Virk	63,617	52.73	
PPP	Syed Muhammmad Akbar Shah	40,704	33.74	
PML(N)	Ch. Walayat Ali	15,352	12.87	
Others	Others (two candidates)	977	0.66	
Turnout		124,672	46.40	
Total valid votes		120,650	96.77	
Rejected ballots		4,022	3.23	
Majority		22,913	18.99	
Registered electors		268,674		

== Election 2008 ==
General elections were held on 18 Feb 2008. Chaudhry Bilal Ahmed Virk of PML-N won by 49,681 votes.

General election 2008: NA-136 Sheikhupura-VI
Party	Candidate	Votes	%	±%
PML(N)	Bilal Anmad Virk	49,681	42.76	
PML(Q)	Peer Tariq Ahmed Shah	39,371	33.89	
PPP	Ch. Tawakkal-Ullah Virk	24,911	21.44	
Others	Others (seven candidates)	2,211	1.91	
Turnout		120,808	54.95	
Total valid votes		116,174	96.16	
Rejected ballots		4,634	3.84	
Majority		10,310	8.87	
Registered electors		219,843		

== Election 2013 ==
General elections were held on 11 May 2013. Chaudhry Bilal Ahmed Virk of PML-N won by 73,775 votes and became the member of National Assembly.

General election 2013: NA-136 Sheikhupura-VI
Party	Candidate	Votes	%	±%
PML(N)	Bilal Anmad Virk	73,775	43.87	
PML(Q)	Shahid Manzoor Gill	36,238	21.55	
PTI	Ch. Muhammed Yaqoob	33,408	19.87	
Independent	Abid Hussain Chattha	15,595	9.27	
Independent	Umer Farooq	2,861	1.70	
Others	Others (nine candidates)	6,296	3.74	
Turnout		174,912	61.27	
Total valid votes		168,173	96.15	
Rejected ballots		6,739	3.85	
Majority		37,537	22.32	
Registered electors		285,503		
