= PP-133 Nankana Sahib-II =

Constituency of the Provincial Assembly of Punjab, Pakistan

- Former constituency for the Provincial Assembly of Punjab
- Region: Shah Kot Tehsil (partly) including Shahkot town and Nankana Sahib Tehsil (partly) including Warburton town of Nankana Sahib District

Former constituency
- Abolished: 2018
- Created from: PP-172 Nankana Sahib-III (2002-2018); PP-132 Nankana Sahib-II (2018-2023)

PP-133 Nankana Sahib-II (پی پی-133، ننكانہ صاحِب-2) is a Constituency of Provincial Assembly of Punjab.

== General elections 2024 ==
Provincial election 2024: PP-133 Nankana Sahib-II
Party	Candidate	Votes	%	±%
PML(N)	Rana Muhammad Arshad	44,323	38.46	
Independent	Muhammad Atif (Note: Filed nomination papers as PTI candidate but ECP allowed him to run as an Independent)	41,632	36.12	
TLP	Muhammad Imtiaz	8,104	7.03	
IPP	Noshair Subhan	7,167	6.22	
Independent	Saeed Ahmed Zafar	6,486	5.63	
PPP	Shakil Ur Rehman	2,979	2.58	
Others	Others (fifteen candidates)	4,566	3.96	
Turnout		120,722	52.03	
Total valid votes		115,257	95.47	
Rejected ballots		5,465	4.53	
Majority		2,691	2.34	
Registered electors		232,035		
hold				

== General elections 2018 ==
Provincial election 2018: PP-132 Nankana Sahib-II
Party	Candidate	Votes	%	±%
PTI	Muhammad Atif	48,672	42.84	
PML(N)	Rana Muhammad Arshad	41,482	36.51	
TLP	Rana Ali Ameer Joiya	14,731	12.97	
PPP	Shakeel Ur Rehman	3,270	2.88	
AAT	Shabbir Anmad	2,180	1.92	
Others	Others (twelve candidates)	3,326	2.88	
Turnout		116,529	57.29	
Total valid votes		113,616	97.50	
Rejected ballots		2,913	2.50	
Majority		7,145	6.33	
Registered electors		203,420		

== General elections 2013 ==
Provincial election 2013: PP-172 Nankana Sahib-III
Party	Candidate	Votes	%	±%
PML(N)	Malik Zulqarnain Dogar	29,032	33.15	
Independent	Shahzad Khalid Khan	23,210	26.50	
Independent	Shahbaz Sharif Chaudhary	10,093	11.52	
Independent	Tahir Miraj	9,261	10.57	
PTI	Muhammad Ehtesham Amir-Ud-Din	6,801	7.76	
PPP	Asghar Ali Bhatti	3,449	3.94	
Independent	Abdul Raoof Qadri	2,264	2.58	
Independent	Muhammad Arshad	1,833	2.09	
Others	Others (twelve candidates)	1,644	1.88	
Turnout		91,108	60.90	
Total valid votes		87,587	96.14	
Rejected ballots		3,521	3.86	
Majority		5,822	6.65	
Registered electors		149,601		

== General elections 2008 ==
Contesting candidates	Party affiliation	Votes polled

== See also ==
- PP-132 Nankana Sahib-I
- PP-134 Nankana Sahib-III
