= Choudhry Bilal Ahmed =

Pakistani politician (born 1974)

- چوہدری بلال احمد ورک

National Assembly of Pakistan
- In office 2002 – 31 May 2018
- Constituency: Nankana Sahib-II-cum-Sheikhupura

Personal details
- Born: 1 January 1974 (age 52) Nankana Sahib, Punjab, Pakistan
- Party: IND (2023–present)
- Other political affiliations: PTI (2018–2023); PMLN (2008–2018); PML(Q) (2002–2008)

Choudhry Bilal Ahmed Virk (Urdu: چوہدری بلال احمد ورک; born 1 January 1974) is a Pakistani politician who had been a member of the National Assembly of Pakistan, from 2002 to May 2018.

== Early life ==
He was born on 1 January 1974 in Pakistan.

== Political career ==
He was elected to the National Assembly of Pakistan as a candidate of the Pakistan Muslim League (Q) (PML(Q)) from Constituency NA-136 (Sheikhupura-VI) in the 2002 Pakistani general election. He received 63,617 votes and defeated Syed Muhammad Akbar Shah, a candidate of the Pakistan Peoples Party (PPP).

He was re-elected to the National Assembly as a candidate of the Pakistan Muslim League (N) (PML(N)) from NA-136 (Nankana Sahib-cum-Sheikhupura) in the 2008 Pakistani general election. He received 49,681 votes and defeated Peer Tariq Ahmed Shah, a candidate of the PML(Q).

He was re-elected to the National Assembly as a candidate of the PML(N) from NA-136 (Nankana Sahib-II Cum-Sheikhupura) in the 2013 Pakistani general election. He received 73,775 votes and defeated Shahid Manzoor Gill, a candidate of the PML(Q).

In April 2018, he quit the PML(N) and joined the Pakistan Tehreek-e-Insaf (PTI).

He ran in the 2018 Pakistani general election from NA-117 Nankana Sahib-I as a candidate of the PTI, but was unsuccessful. He received 66,994 votes and was defeated by Barjees Tahir, a candidate of the PML(N).
