= NA-111 Nankana Sahib-I =

Constituency of the National Assembly of Pakistan

- Constituency for the National Assembly of Pakistan
- Region: Sangla Hill Tehsil; Shah Kot Tehsil; Nankana Sahib Tehsil (partly) of Nankana Sahib District
- Electorate: 482,346

Current constituency
- Party: Pakistan Tehreek-e-Insaf
- Member(s): Arshad Sahi
- Created from: NA-135 Nankana Sahib-I-cum-Sheikhupura; NA-136 Nankana Sahib-II-cum-Sheikhupura; NA-137 Nankana Sahib-III

NA-111 Nankana Sahib-I (این اے-111، ننکانہ صاحب-١) is a constituency for the National Assembly of Pakistan.

== Area ==
During the delimitation of 2018, NA-117 Nankana Sahib-I acquired areas from three former constituencies namely NA-135 (Nankana Sahib-I-cum-Sheikhupura), NA-136 (Nankana Sahib-II-cum-Sheikhupura), and NA-137 Nankana Sahib-III with most coming from NA-135 (Nankana Sahib-I-cum-Sheikhupura), the areas of Nankana Sahib District which are part of this constituency are listed below alongside the former constituency name from which they were acquired:

Areas acquired from NA-135 Nankana Sahib-I-cum-Sheikhupura

- Sangla Hill Tehsil
- Shah Kot Tehsil (excluding Chak No. 166/RB, Chak No. 177/RB, and Chak No. 184/RB)

Areas acquired from NA-136 Nankana Sahib-II-cum-Sheikhupura

- Municipal Committee Warburton
- Following areas of Nankana Sahib Tehsil
  - Warburton
  - Machharala

Areas acquired from NA-137 Nankana Sahib-III

- Following areas of Shah Kot Tehsil
  - Chak No. 166/RB
  - Chak No. 177/RB
  - Chak No. 184/RB
- Following areas of Nankana Sahib Tehsil
  - Mohlan (excluding Machharala)
  - Chak No. 370/GB
  - Chak No. 572/GB
  - Chak No. 574/GB

== Members of Parliament ==
=== 2018–2023: NA-117 Nankana Sahib-I ===
Election	Member	Party
2018	Barjees Tahir	PML (N)

=== 2024–present: NA-111 Nankana Sahib-I ===
Election	Member	Party
2024	Arshad Sahi	PTI

== Election 1990 ==
General elections were held on 24 October 1990. Mirza Ahmed Baig of PML-N won by 55,839 votes.

== Election 1993 ==
General elections were held on 6 October 1993. Mirza Ahmed Baig of PML-N won by 49,539 votes.

== Election 1997 ==
General elections were held on 3 February 1997. Chaudhry Muhammad Barjees Tahir of PML-N won by 52,739 votes.

== Election 2002 ==
General elections were held on 10 October 2002. Mian Shamim Haider of PML-Q won by 47,404 votes.

General election 2002: NA-135 Nankana Sahib-I
Party	Candidate	Votes	%	±%
PML(Q)	Mian Shamim Haider	47,404	40.31	
PPP	Mian Mushtaq Hussain Dogar	37,556	31.94	
PML(N)	Muhammad Barjees Tahir	30,609	26.03	
Others	Others (four candidates)	2,019	1.72	
Turnout		120,953	48.81	
Total valid votes		117,588	97.22	
Rejected ballots		3,365	2.78	
Majority		9,848	8.37	
Registered electors		247,790		

== Election 2008 ==
General elections were held on 18 February 2008. Chaudhry Muhammad Barjees Tahir of PML-N won by 46,739 votes.

General election 2008: NA-135 Nankana Sahib-I
Party	Candidate	Votes	%	±%
PML(N)	Muhammad Barjees Tahir	46,739	39.46	
PPP	Rai Ijaz Ahmad Khan	42,588	35.95	
PML(Q)	Mian Shamim Haider	24,748	20.89	
Others	Others (five candidates)	4,388	3.70	
Turnout		124,469	54.80	
Total valid votes		118,463	95.18	
Rejected ballots		6,006	4.82	
Majority		4,151	3.51	
Registered electors		227,137		
PML(N) gain from PML(Q)				

== Election 2013 ==
General elections were held on 11 May 2013. Chaudhry Muhammad Barjees Tahir of PML-N won by 82,150 votes and became the member of National Assembly.

General election 2013: NA-135 Nankana Sahib-I
Party	Candidate	Votes	%	±%
PML(N)	Muhammad Barjees Tahir	82,150	50.73	
PTI	Muhammad Arshad Sahi	40,628	25.09	
Independent	Rai Ijaz Ahmad Khan	15,117	9.34	
Others	Others (twenty five candidates)	24,043	14.84	
Turnout		168,808	59.17	
Total valid votes		161,938	95.93	
Rejected ballots		6,870	4.07	
Majority		41,522	25.64	
Registered electors		285,289		
PML(N) hold				

== Election 2018 ==
General elections were held on 25 July 2018.

General election 2018: NA-117 Nankana Sahib-I
Party	Candidate	Votes	%	±%
PML(N)	Barjees Tahir	71,891	30.74	
Independent	Tariq Mehmood Bajwa	68,995	29.50	
PTI	Choudhry Bilal Ahmed	66,994	28.65	
Others	Others (eight candidates)	25,990	11.11	
Turnout		240,306	58.40	
Total valid votes		233,870	97.32	
Rejected ballots		6,436	2.68	
Majority		2,896	1.24	
Registered electors		411,484		
PML(N) hold		Swing	N/A	

== Election 2024 ==
General elections were held on 8 February 2024. Arshad Sahi won the election with 113,711 votes.

General election 2024: NA-111 Nankana Sahib-I
Party	Candidate	Votes	%	±%
PTI	Arshad Sahi (Note: Filed nomination papers as PTI candidate but ECP allowed him to run as an Independent)	113,711	45.83	▲17.18
PML(N)	Barjees Tahir	93,467	37.67	▲6.93
TLP	Muhammad Rizwan	25,345	10.21	▲1.85
Others	Others (sixteen candidates)	15,612	6.29	
Turnout		255,116	52.89	▼5.51
Total valid votes		248,135	97.26	
Rejected ballots		6,981	2.74	
Majority		20,244	8.16	
Registered electors		482,346		

== See also ==
- NA-110 Jhang-III
- NA-112 Nankana Sahib-II
