= Kali Bair =

Village in Pakistan

Coordinates: 31°24′16.19″N 73°44′54.62″E

Kali Bair (also spelled as Kalibair) is a village in the suburbs of Nankana Sahib city, Punjab, Pakistan.

== Gallery ==
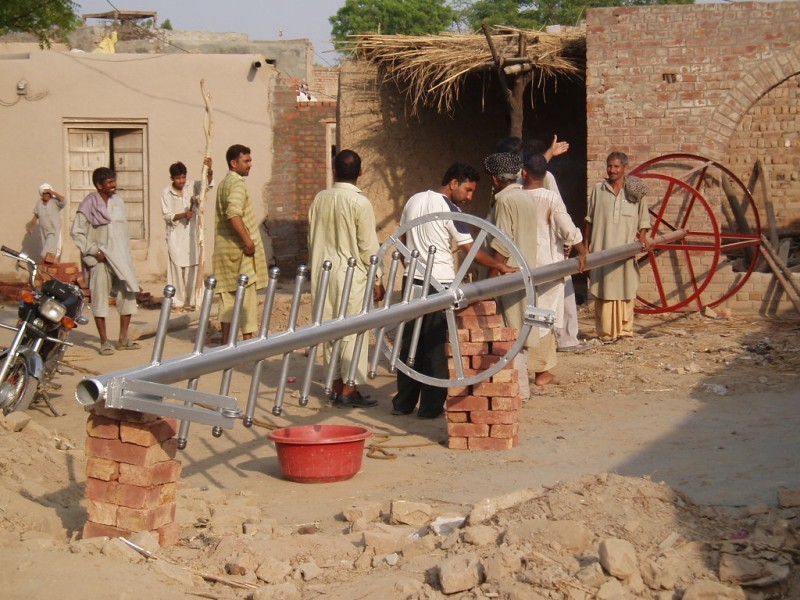
People preparing ALAM for Kali Bair graveyard.

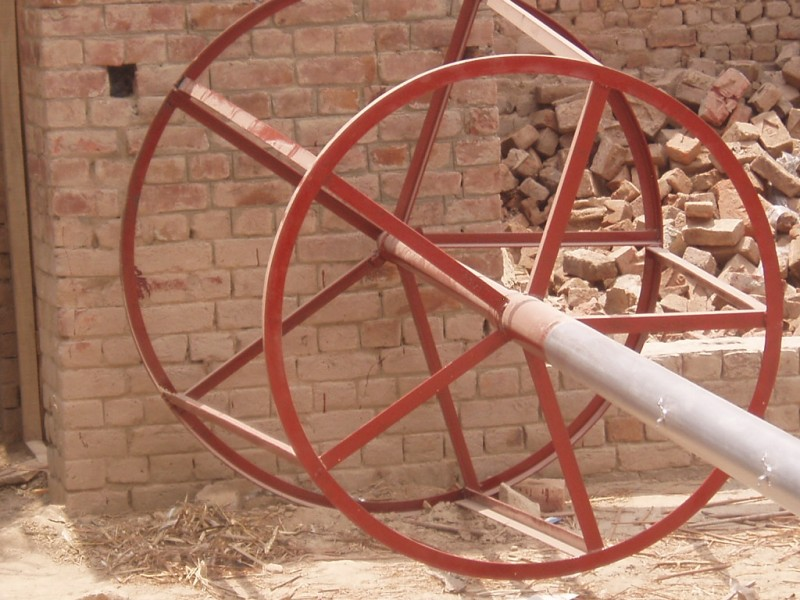
The bottom of Alam erected at Kalibair Graveyard.
