= Arshad Sahi =

Member of the National Assembly of Pakistan from Nankana Sahib (2024–2029)

- ارشد ساہی

Member of the National Assembly of Pakistan
- Incumbent
- Assumed office 29 February 2024
- Constituency: NA-111 Nankana Sahib-I

Personal details
- Party: PTI (2013-present)

Muhammad Arshad Sahi (Urdu: محمد ارشد ساہی) is a Pakistani politician who has been a member of the National Assembly of Pakistan since February 2024.

== Political career ==
Sahi contested the 2013 Pakistani general election from NA-135 Nankana Sahib-cum-Sheikhupura-I as a candidate of Pakistan Tehreek-e-Insaf (PTI), but was unsuccessful. He received 40,628 votes and was defeated by Barjees Tahir, a candidate of Pakistan Muslim League (N) (PML(N)).

He was elected to the National Assembly of Pakistan in the 2024 Pakistani general election from NA-111 Nankana Sahib-I as an Independent candidate supported by PTI. He received 113,711 votes while runner-up Barjees Tahir, a candidate of PML(N), received 93,467 votes.
