= More Khunda =

- Town
- Location within Pakistan
- Coordinates: 31.18°N 73.39°E
- Country: Pakistan
- Province: Punjab
- District: Nankana Sahib
- Tehsil: Nankana Sahib

Area
  - Total: 3 km^{2} (1.2 sq mi)
- Elevation: 179 m (587 ft)

Population (2021)
  - Total: 16,900
- Time zone: UTC+5 (PST)

More Khunda is a town in Nankana Sahib District of Punjab, Pakistan. Within the town, Mangtanwala village has fertile land and rich from rice and wheat crops. A canal also flows in the city.

== History ==
The city is located in two National Assembly regions and two provincial assembly regions as NA-118 and PP-134. The main courtyard of town is T-shaped (a T-shaped instrument used by local blacksmiths) because of which it is called Khunda. In the 1960s when the town started developing, it just had a bus stop and some tea corners and cigarette shops near the bus stop and also some commission shops. But slowly that small bus stop started developing due to being on the national highway. Early that road was barren and desolate. But then the road was rebuilt and became national highway and the bus stops and small villages got importance. Among all those small villages and bus stops More Khunda developed the most because it is located on the two most busy roads of region, one Lahore–Jaranwala Road and More Khunda–Bhai Pheru Road.

== Notable residents ==
- Guru Nanak- founder of Sikhism
- Ganga Ram, civil engineer and architect
- Muhammad Ayub, cricketer
- Muhammad Azeem, wrestler
