= Kot Hussain =

- Village
- Location within Pakistan
- Coordinates: 31.397°N 73.689°E
- Country: Pakistan
- Province: Punjab
- District: Nankana Sahib
- Time zone: UTC+5 (PST)

Kot Hussain is a village located in the Nankana Sahib District of Punjab province in Pakistan.
