= Rai Mansab Ali Khan =

Pakistani politician

- رائے منصب علی خان

Member of the National Assembly of Pakistan
- In office 1 June 2013 – 14 January 2015
- Constituency: NA-137 (Sheikhupura-VII)
- In office 2002–2007
- Constituency: NA-137 (Sheikhupura-VII)

Personal details
- Born: September 15, 1938 Nankana Sahib, Punjab, Pakistan
- Died: January 14, 2015 (aged 76) Nankana Sahib
- Party: Pakistan Muslim League (N)
- Children: Shizra Mansab Ali Khan

Rai Mansab Ali Khan (Urdu: رائے منصب علی خان; 15 September 1938 - 14 January 2015) was a Pakistani politician who started his political career in 1962 as the youngest ever MPA at the age of 25 in Field Marshal Ayub Khan's government. He was a member of the Majlis-i-Shura of General Zia-ul-Haq and was elected MNA National Assembly of Pakistan many times: from 1985 to 1987, 1990 to 1992, 1995 to 1997, 2002 to 2007, and 2013 to 2015.

== Early life and education ==
Khan was born on September 15, 1938, in Nankana Sahib. According to another report, he was born on 13 September 1938.

He completed his law degree from University of the Punjab in 1960.

He was a man of letters and was well-known and admired in literary circles. He wrote poetry, essays and opinion pieces in Urdu and Punjabi. He was known as a great patron of both languages, and several magazines, quarterlies, and annual risalas and journals ran because of his patronage. One of his best friends was Maskoor Hussain Yaad, the famous poet and writer of Urdu.

== Political career ==
Khan was elected to the National Assembly of Pakistan as a candidate of Pakistan Muslim League (Q) (PML-Q) from Constituency NA-137 (Sheikhupura-VII) in the 2002 Pakistani general election. He received 61,506 votes and defeated Muhammad Nisar Ahmed Khan, a candidate of Pakistan Peoples Party (PPP).

He ran for the seat of the National Assembly as a candidate of Pakistan Muslim League (N) (PML-N) from Constituency NA-137 (Sheikhupura-VII) in the 2008 Pakistani general election but was unsuccessful. He received 44,745 votes and lost the seat to Saeed Ahmed Zafar.

He was re-elected to the National Assembly as a candidate of PML-N from Constituency NA-137 (Sheikhupura-VII) in the 2013 Pakistani general election. He received 61,329 votes and defeated an independent candidate, Ijaz Ahmed Shah.

== Death ==
He died on 14 January 2015 in Nankana Sahib due to heart attack.
