= Chokery Kharlan =

Village in Nankana Sahib district in Pakistan

Chokery Kharlan is a village in Nankana Sahib district in Pakistan.
