= Saeed Ahmed Zafar =

Pakistani politician

Member of the National Assembly of Pakistan
- In office 2008–2013
- Constituency: NA-137 (Sheikhupura-VII)

Saeed Ahmed Zafar is a Pakistani politician who had been a member of the National Assembly of Pakistan from 2008 to 2013.

== Political career ==
He was elected to the National Assembly from Constituency NA-137 (Sheikhupura-VII) as an independent candidate in the 2008 Pakistani general election. He received 54,732 votes and defeated Rai Mansab Ali Khan.

He ran for the seat of the National Assembly from Constituency NA-137 (Nankana Sahib-III) as an independent candidate in the 2013 Pakistani general election but was unsuccessful. He received 22,967 votes and lost the seat to Rai Mansab Ali Khan.
