= Baba Guru Nanak University =

University in Nankana Sahib, Pakistan

Coordinates: 31.49403°N 73.72513°E

- بابا گرو نانک یونیورسٹی
- Other names: BGNU and GNU
- Type: Public
- Established: 2020
- Accreditation: Punjab Higher Education Commission
- Chancellor: Governor of the Punjab
- Vice-Chancellor: Muhammad Afzal
- Location: Nankana Sahib, Punjab, Pakistan
- Website: gnu.edu.pk

Baba Guru Nanak University (Punjabi and Urdu:; bābā gurū nānaka yūnīvarasiṭī) is a public university located in Nankana Sahib, Punjab, Pakistan, the birthplace of Guru Nanak. On 28 October 2019, Prime Minister of Pakistan, Imran Khan laid the foundation stone of the university.

== Introduction ==
Baba Guru Nanak University (BGNU) is a university and this project is given to Shafiq Construction Company which is under construction in Nankana Sahib, in the Punjab region of Pakistan. It plans to facilitate between 5,000 and 10,000 students from all over the world at the university.

== Master plan ==
The plans are for it to be modeled along the lines of renowned universities like Oxford and Cambridge, with focus on Punjabi language and Khalsa studies offering faculties in "Medicine", "Dentistry", "Pharmacy", "Engineering", "Computer science", "Languages", "Music" and "Social sciences". After a facilities planning meeting in June 2007, High Court (Uganda) Judge Anup Singh Choudry and a group based in Southall, UK known as the World Muslim Sikh Federation have produced a detailed concept plan and blueprints calling for 2,500 acres (10 km^{2}) to be set aside for the proposed institution.

== Foundation stone ==
The Pakistani government's Evacuee Trust Property Board announced that the university's groundbreaking will commence by the end of August 2016. The foundation stone for the university was laid for second time on 28 October 2019 ahead of the 550th Guru Nanak Gurpurab.

== Project cost ==
6 billion Rupees are to be spent on construction of Baba Guru Nanak University project in Nankana Sahib.

== Proposed names ==
The "World Muslim Sikh Federation" (WMSF) proposes that the name of the university should be one of the following three:

- Guru Nanak International University
- Baba Nanak International University
- Nanak International University

== See also ==
- Kartarpur Corridor
- Pakistan Sikh Gurdwara Prabandhak Committee
- Sikhism in Pakistan
- Guru Nanak Dev University
