= Shezra Mansab Ali Khan =

Pakistani politician

Shezra Mansab Ali Khan Kharal
- شذرا منصب علی خان
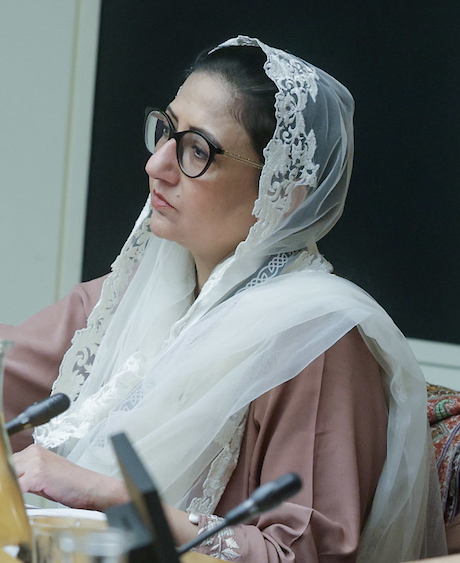
- Shezra Mansab Ali Khan in 2025.

Member of the National Assembly of Pakistan
- Incumbent
- Assumed office 29 February 2024
- Constituency: NA-112 Nankana Sahib-II
- In office 2015–2018
- Constituency: NA-137 Nankana Sahib-III

Personal details
- Party: PMLN (2015–present)
- Parent: Rai Mansab Ali Khan (father)

Shezra Mansab Ali Khan Kharal (Urdu: شذرا منصب علی خان) is a Pakistani politician who is Minister of state for Climate Change and member of the National Assembly of Pakistan.

== Early life and education ==
She was born to Rai Mansab Ali Khan who had been elected several times as a member of Provincial Assembly and National Assembly of Pakistan from Nankana Sahib, Punjab.

She holds a doctorate degree in English literature and is a graduate of the University of Glasgow.

== Political career ==
She was elected to the National Assembly of Pakistan as a candidate of Pakistan Muslim League (N) from Constituency NA-137 (Nankana Sahib-III) in a by-election held in 2015. She received 77,890 votes and defeated an independent candidate, Ijaz Shah.

She ran in the 2013 Pakistani general election as a candidate of PML-N from NA-118 (Nankana Sahib-II), but was unsuccessful. She received 61,413 votes and was defeated by Ijaz Ahmed Shah, a candidate of Pakistan Tehreek-e-Insaf (PTI), who received 63,818 votes.

She ran in the 2022 Pakistani by-elections as a candidate of PML(N) from NA-118 Nankana Sahib-II, but was unsuccessful. She received 78,024 votes and was defeated by Imran Khan, the leader of PTI.

She was re-elected to the National Assembly in the 2024 Pakistani general election from NA-112 Nankana Sahib-II as a candidate of PML(N). She received 105,656 votes and defeated Ijaz Ahmed Shah, an Independent politician Supported Pakistan Tehreek-e-Insaf, candidate supported by (PTI). She is Minister of state for Climate change in the Federal cabinet.
