= Ijaz Ahmed Shah =

Pakistani politician

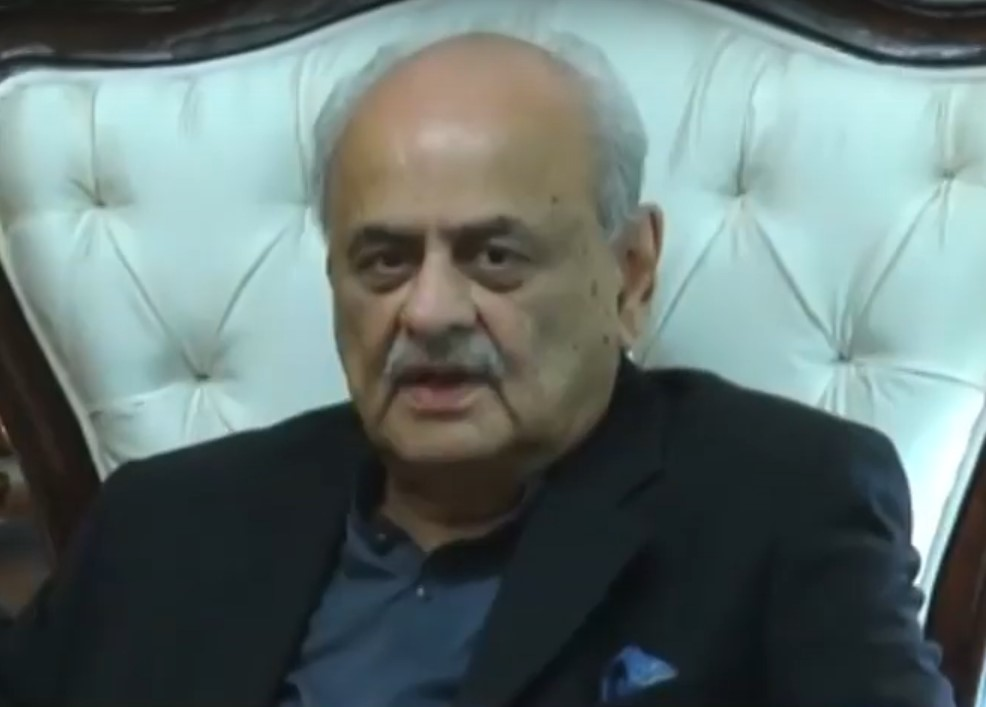

Minister of Narcotics Control
- In office 11 December 2020 – 10 April 2022
- President: Arif Alvi
- Prime Minister: Imran Khan
- Preceded by: Azam Swati
- Succeeded by: Shahzain Bugti

37th Minister for Interior
- In office 18 April 2019 – 11 December 2020
- President: Arif Alvi
- Prime Minister: Imran Khan
- Preceded by: Imran Khan
- Succeeded by: Sheikh Rasheed Ahmad

Member of the National Assembly of Pakistan
- In office 13 August 2018 – 29 July 2022
- Constituency: NA-118 Nankana Sahib-II

Personal details
- Born: Nankana Sahib, Punjab, Pakistan
- Party: PTI (2018-present)
- Other political affiliations: IND (2013); PPP (2002-2007)
- Nickname: Brig. Shah

Military service
- Allegiance: Pakistan
- Branch/service: Pakistan Army
- Years of service: 1966–2004
- Rank: Brigadier
- Unit: 15 Infantry Punjab Regiment and Inter-Services Intelligence (ISI)
- Commands: DG Intelligence Bureau (DGIB)
- Battles/wars: Indo-Pakistani War of 1971

Ijaz Ahmed Shah is a Pakistani politician, former military officer and spy. He was serving as the Federal Minister for Narcotics Control, was in office since 11 December 2020. Previously, he served as the Federal Minister for interior from April 2019 to 11 December 2020 and Minister of Parliamentary Affairs from March 2019 to April 2019. He was a member of the National Assembly of Pakistan from August 2018 till July 2022.

== Military career ==
Shah was a long-term close associate of President Pervez Musharraf, and was Director of the Inter-Services Intelligence (ISI) Punjab during Musharraf's 1999 coup. Musharraf appointed Shah as Director-General of Intelligence Bureau of Pakistan from 2004 to 2008. Shah's tenure as the head of Intelligence Bureau was controversial with accusations of political victimisation and for undermining the judiciary.

=== Alleged involvement in Benazir Bhutto's assassination plot ===
According to the PPP Senator Latif Khosa, days after the 2007 Karachi bombings, Benazir Bhutto in a letter to President Musharaf written on 16 October 2007 allegedly named Ijaz Shah as one of the four persons including the then chief minister of Punjab Chaudhry Pervaiz Elahi, the then chief minister of Sindh Arbab Ghulam Rahim, and the former ISI chief Hamid Gul she suspected were behind the attacks.

=== Osama bin Laden compound ===
General Ziauddin Butt, former Director General of the ISI allegedly revealed in October 2011 that according to his knowledge Ijaz Shah, had kept Osama bin Laden in an Intelligence Bureau of Pakistan safe house in Abbottabad but later denied making any such statement, after Shah announced filing a defamation suit against him.

== Political career ==
Shah has served as the Home Secretary of Punjab in 2002. During his tenure, he was accused of the formation of the PML-Q and PPP-Patriots.

In 2004, he was appointed the Pakistani High Commissioner to Australia but was rejected by Australia's Department of Foreign Affairs.

He ran for the seat of the National Assembly of Pakistan from NA-118 (Nankana Sahib-II) as an independent candidate in the 2013 Pakistani general election, but was unsuccessful.

He again ran for the seat of the National Assembly of Pakistan from NA-118 (Nankana Sahib-II) as an independent candidate, with support of Pakistan Tehreek-e-Insaf (PTI), in the 2015 by-elections, but was again unsuccessful. He lost to Shizra Mansab Ali Khan.

He was elected to the National Assembly of Pakistan from NA-118 (Nankana Sahib-II) as a candidate of PTI in the 2018 Pakistani general election. He received 63,818 votes and defeated Shezra Mansab Ali of Pakistan Muslim League (N).

In March 2019, he was made the Federal Minister for Parliamentary Affairs which he held till 16 April 2019.

On 18 April 2019, in a cabinet reshuffle, he was sworn in as Federal Interior Minister of Pakistan, the post previously held by Shehryar Khan Afridi.

On 10 April 2022, because of the motion of no confidence, he resigned from the National Assembly on the orders of Imran Khan. The new government did not accept the resignations of many members for fear of deteriorating the number of members. However, accepting the resignations of eleven members on 28 July 2022, one of them was Ijaz Ahmed Shah. Later, by-elections were held again on his seat, Imran Khan made a surprising move to stand on his own in all the by-seats.

== Family ==
His younger brothers, pir Mumtaz Ahmed Shah (pappu Shah) and Pir Tariq Ahmed Shah, who was elected president of the Nankana District Bar Association, both died in 2020, the former in July and the latter in August.
