= Gurdwara Janam Asthan =

Sikh temple in Punjab, Pakistan

Coordinates: 31°26′51″N 73°41′50″E

- گردوارہ جنم استھان ਗੁਰਦੁਆਰਾ ਜਨਮ ਅਸਥਾਨ
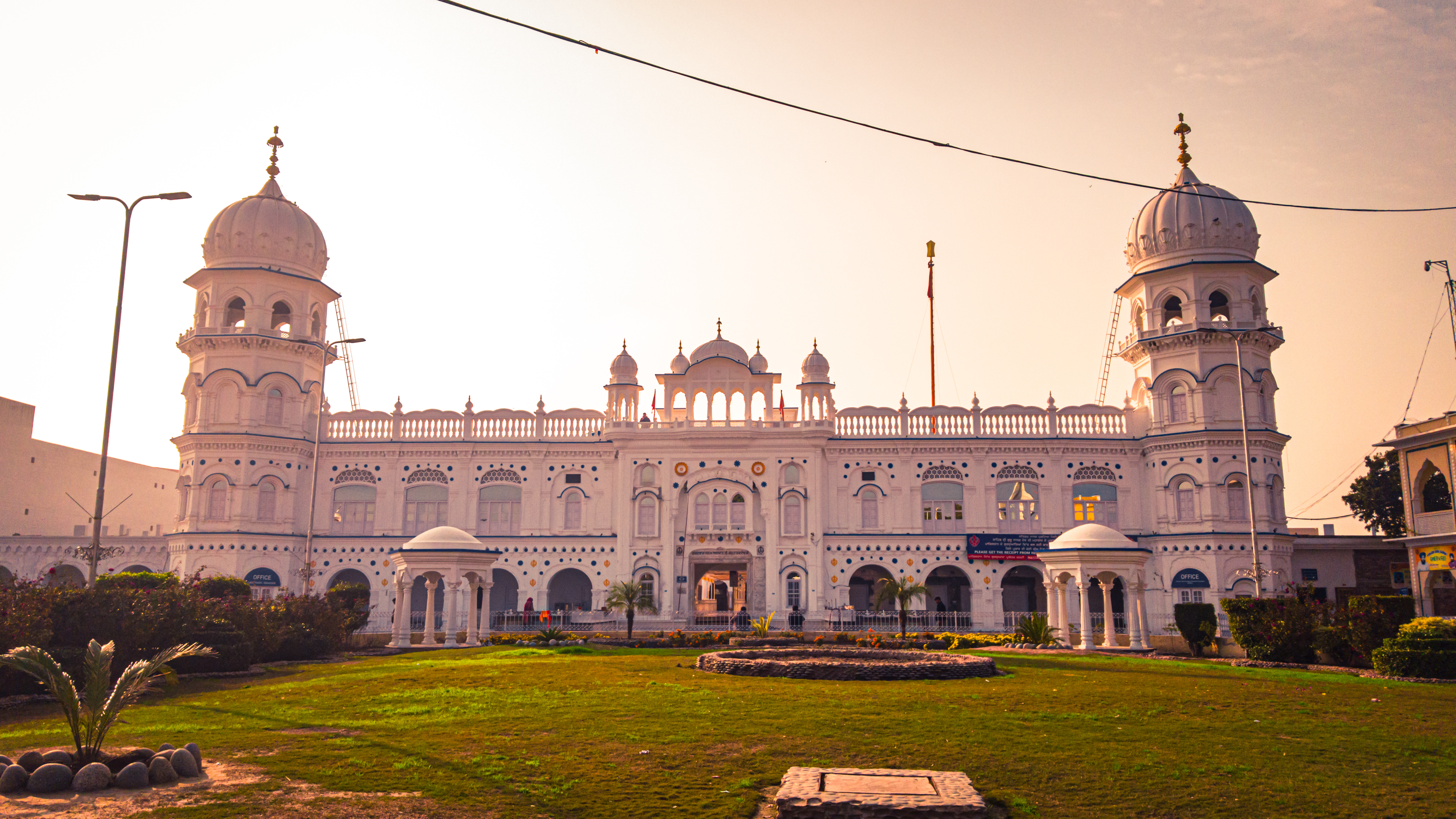
- Gurdwara Janam Asthan (The birth place), also known as the Gurdwara Nankana Sahib
- Interactive map of the Gurdwara Janam Asthan area

General information
- Architectural style: Sikh architecture
- Location: Nankana Sahib, Punjab, Pakistan
- Construction started: 1600 A.D.
- Completed: 1819–20 A.D.

Gurdwara Janam Asthan, (Note: Shahmukhi Punjabi and Urdu: گردوارہ جنم استھان Gurmukhi Punjabi: ਗੁਰਦੁਆਰਾ ਜਨਮ ਅਸਥਾਨ) also known as Gurdwara Nankana Sahib, (Note: Shahmukhi Punjabi: گردوارہ ننکاݨا صاحب Urdu: گردوارہ ننکانہ صاحب Gurmukhi Punjabi: ਗੁਰਦੁਆਰਾ ਨਨਕਾਣਾ ਸਾਹਿਬ) is a gurdwara, and one of the holiest sites of Sikhism, located in Nankana Sahib, Punjab, Pakistan. It is situated at the site where Guru Nanak, the founder of Sikhism, was born. It is officially listed as a 'Protected Heritage Monument' by the Government of Punjab, Pakistan; and is managed by the Pakistan Sikh Gurdwara Parbandhak Committee under the federal government of Pakistan.

== Location ==
The shrine is located in the town of Nankana Sahib, approximately 65 kilometres from Lahore. Nankana Sahib had previously been known as Rāi Bhoi Kī Talvaṇḍī, but was eventually renamed in honour of Guru Nanak.

== Significance ==
Gurdwara Janam Asthan is believed to be located at the site where Guru Nanak was born to Mehta Kalu and Mata Tripta.

The gurdwara forms part of an ensemble of nine important gurdwaras in Nankana Sahib. The shrine is frequently visited by Sikh yatris as part of a pilgrimage route in Pakistan.

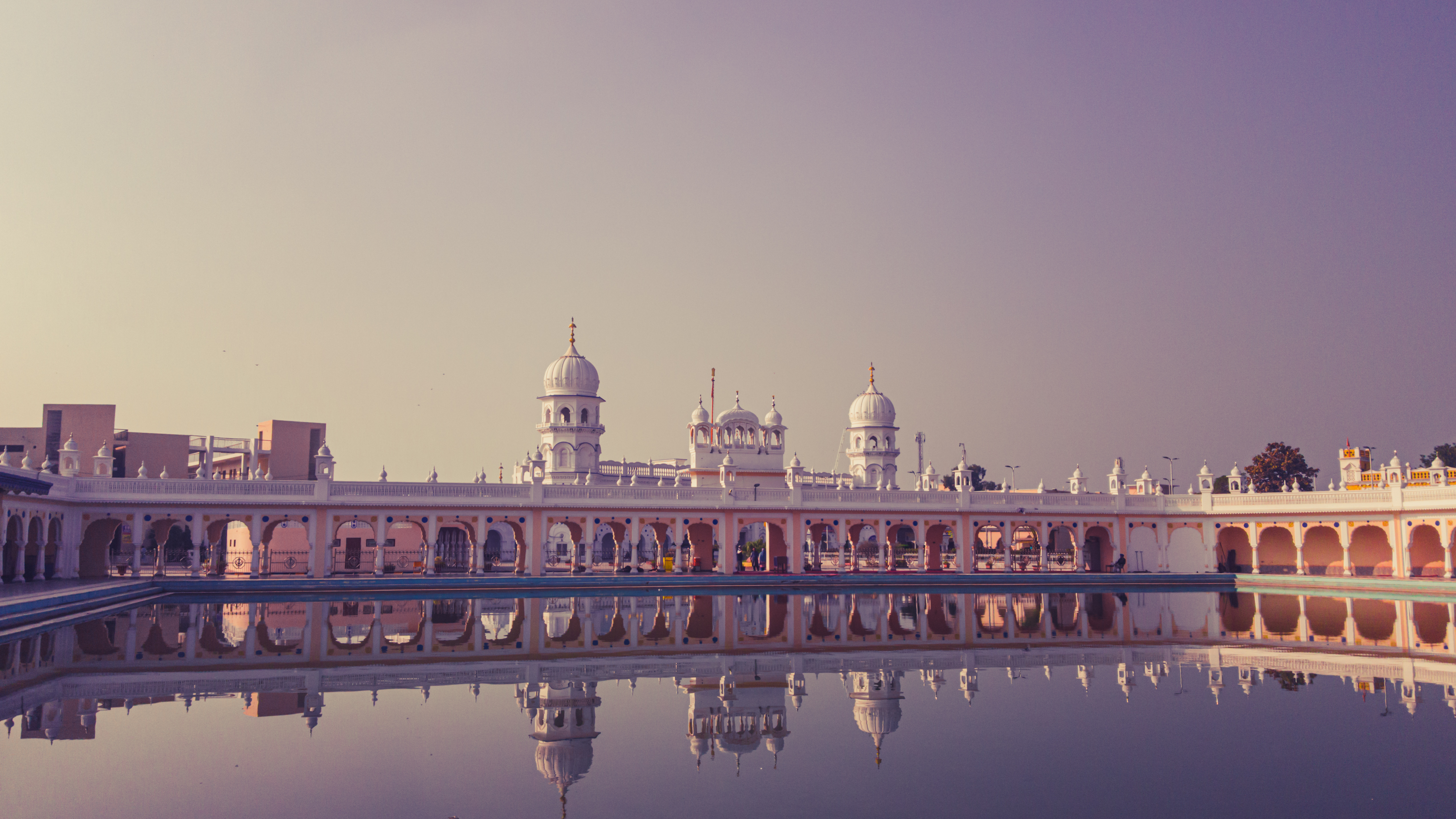
Gudrwara Janam Asthan

== History ==
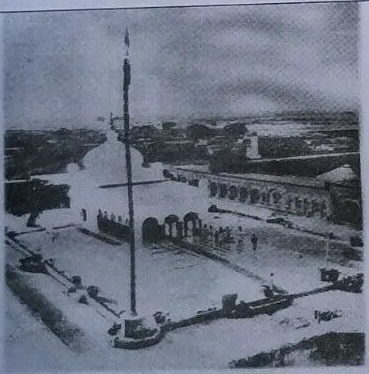
Photograph of the Gurdwara Janam Asthan published in Mahan Kosh (1930), ca.1920's

The first gurdwara is believed to have been built at the site in the 16th century by the grandson of Guru Nanak, Baba Dharam Chand. The current gurdwara was built by Ranjit Singh in the 19th century.

=== 1921 Massacre ===
86 Sikhs were killed during the 20 February 1921 Nankana massacre, which took place after a confrontation between supporters of the gurdwara's manager, Mahant Narayan Das, and members of the reformist Akali movement who accused him of both corruption and sexual impropriety.

== Conservation ==
The gurdwara complex is listed on the Protected Heritage Monuments of the Archaeology Department of Punjab.

== Gallery ==
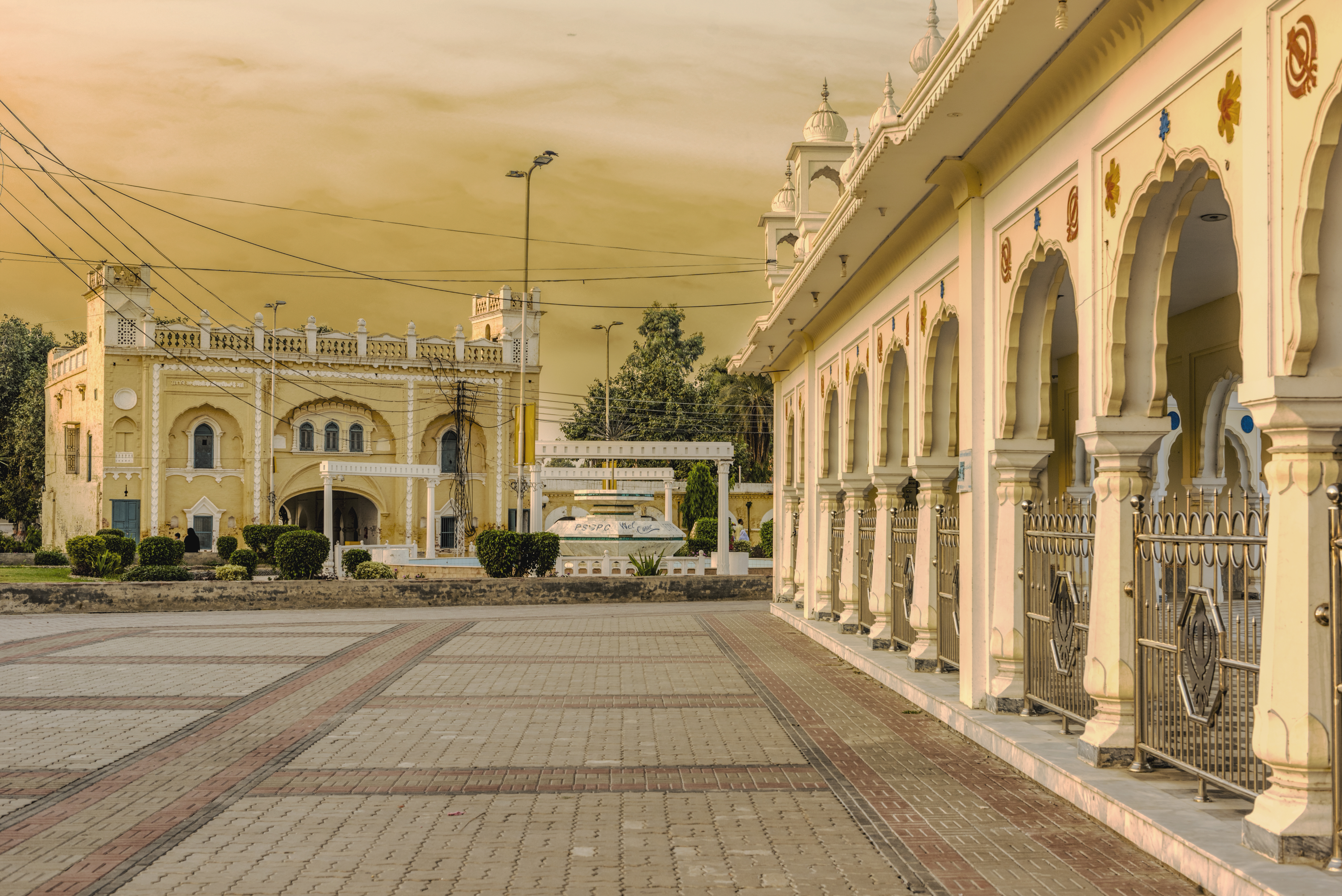
Main entrance

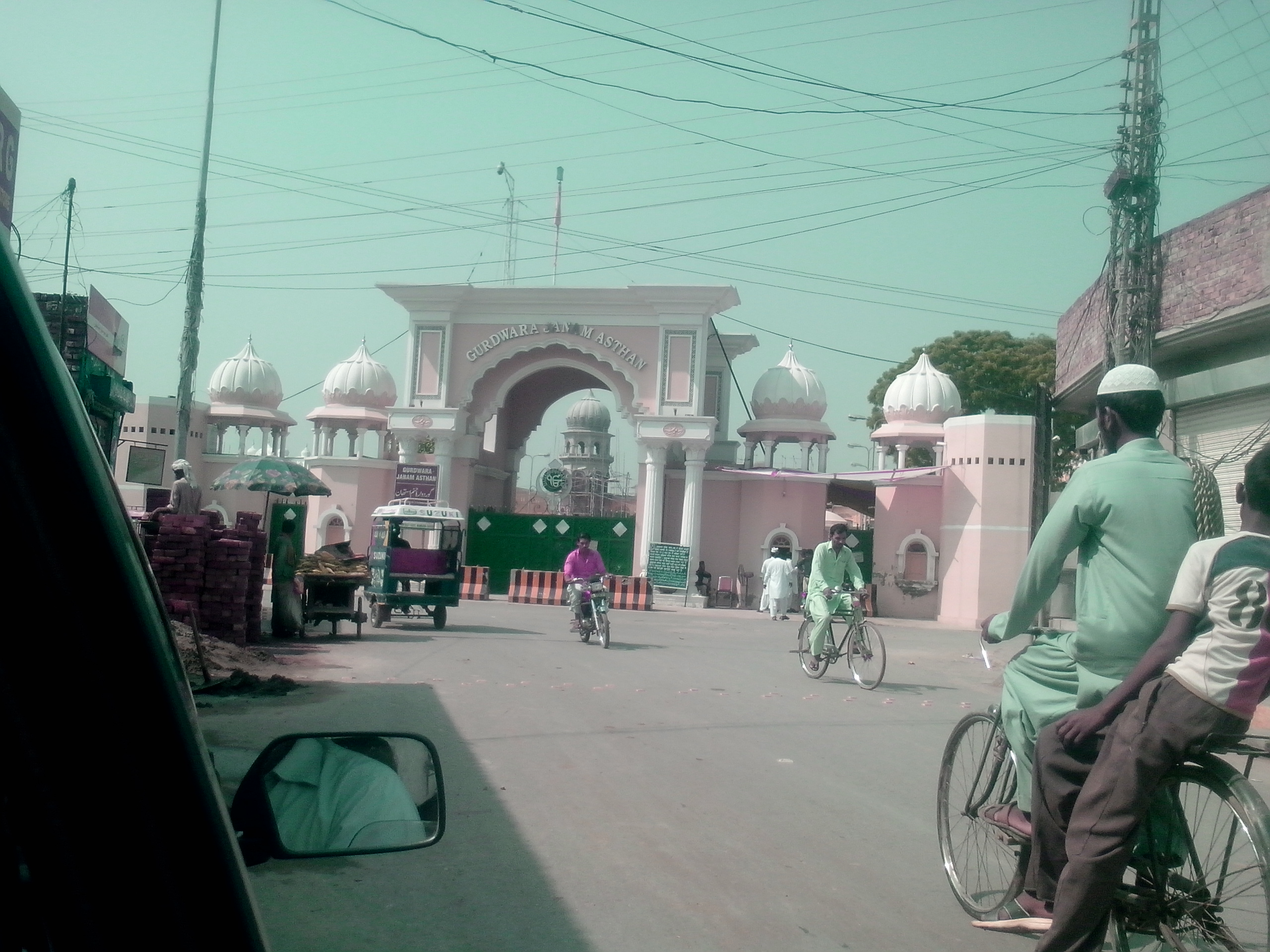
The main gate of Gurdwara Janam Asthan

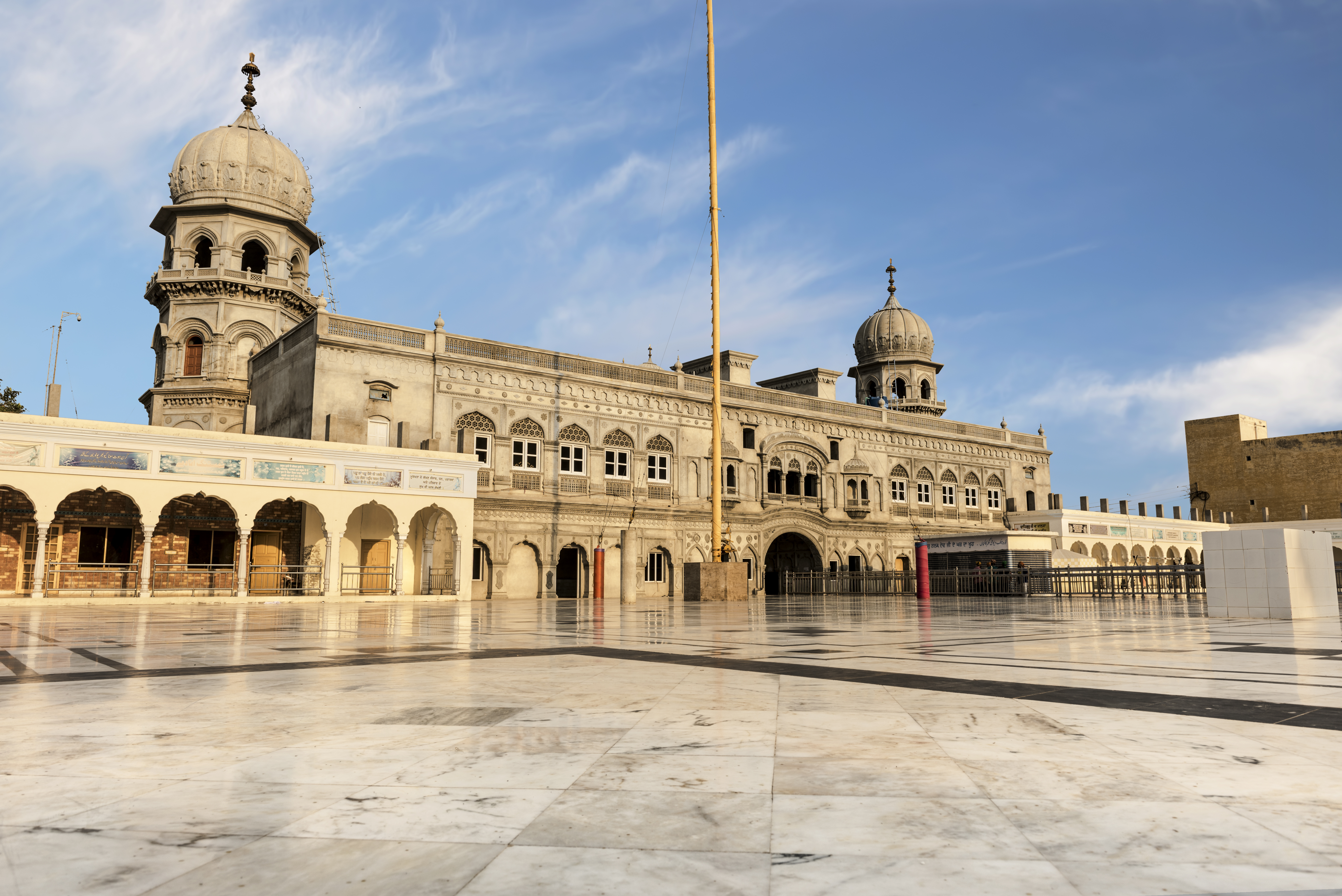
Courtyard view

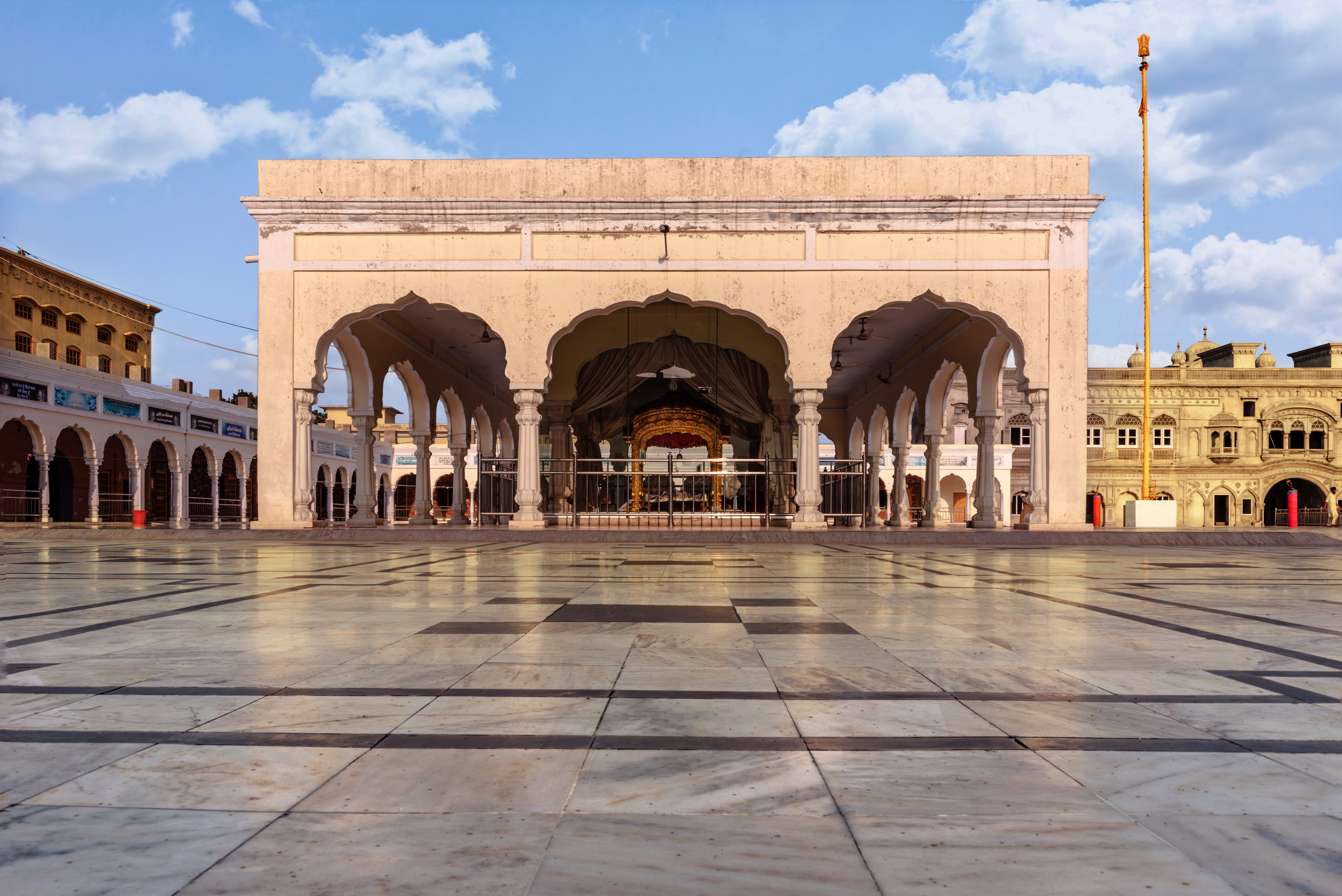
Darbār hall

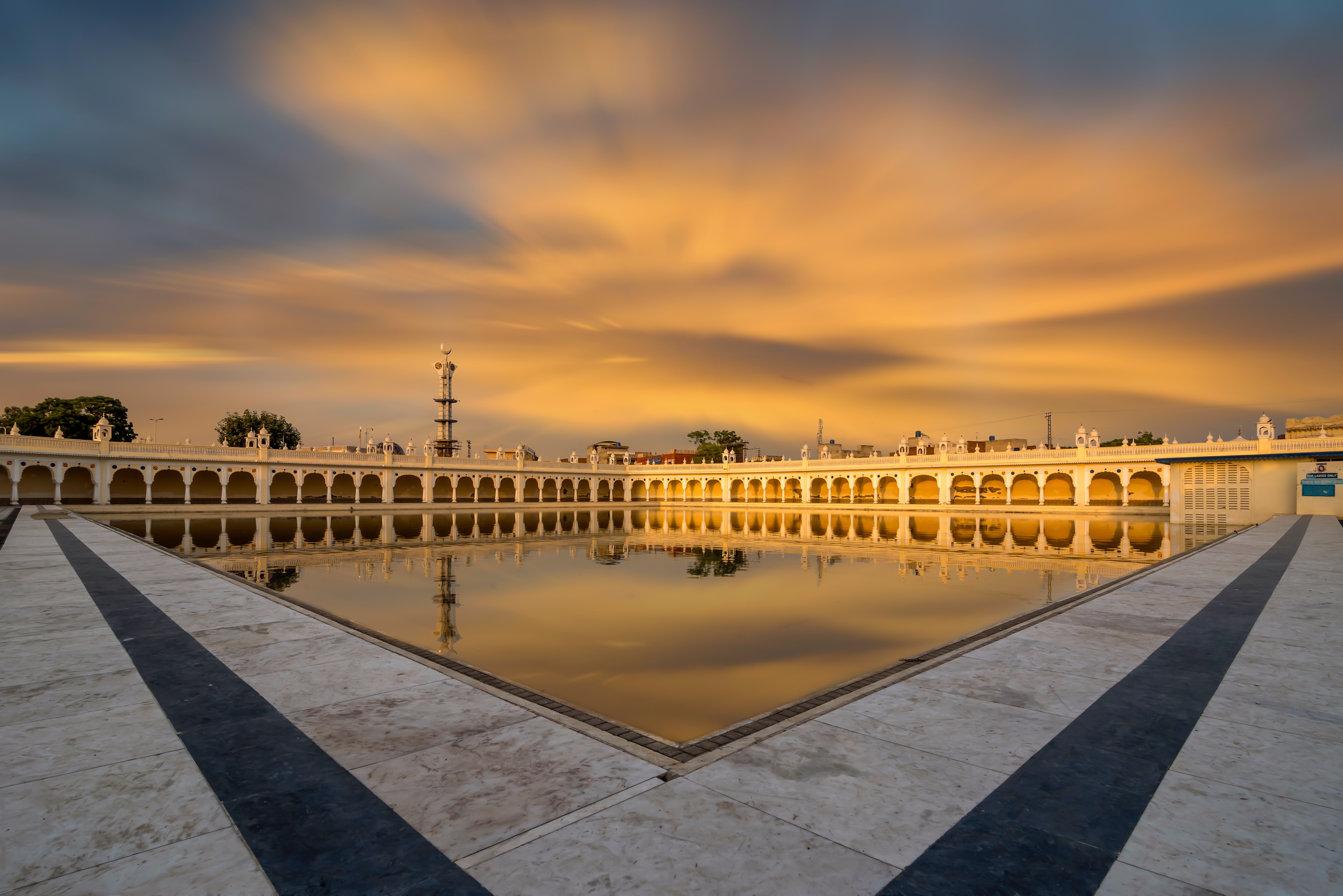
Sarovar

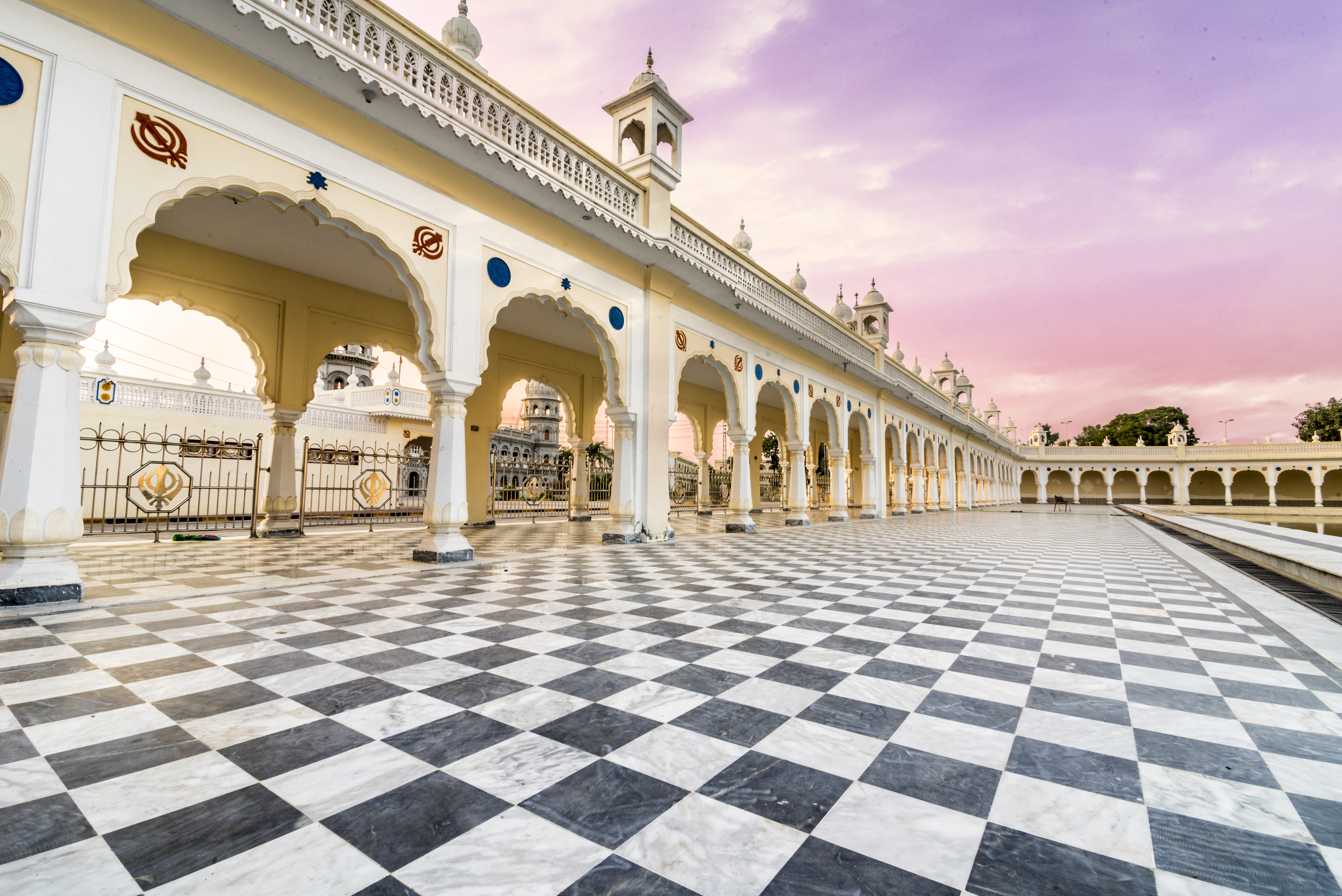
Arcades around the sarovar

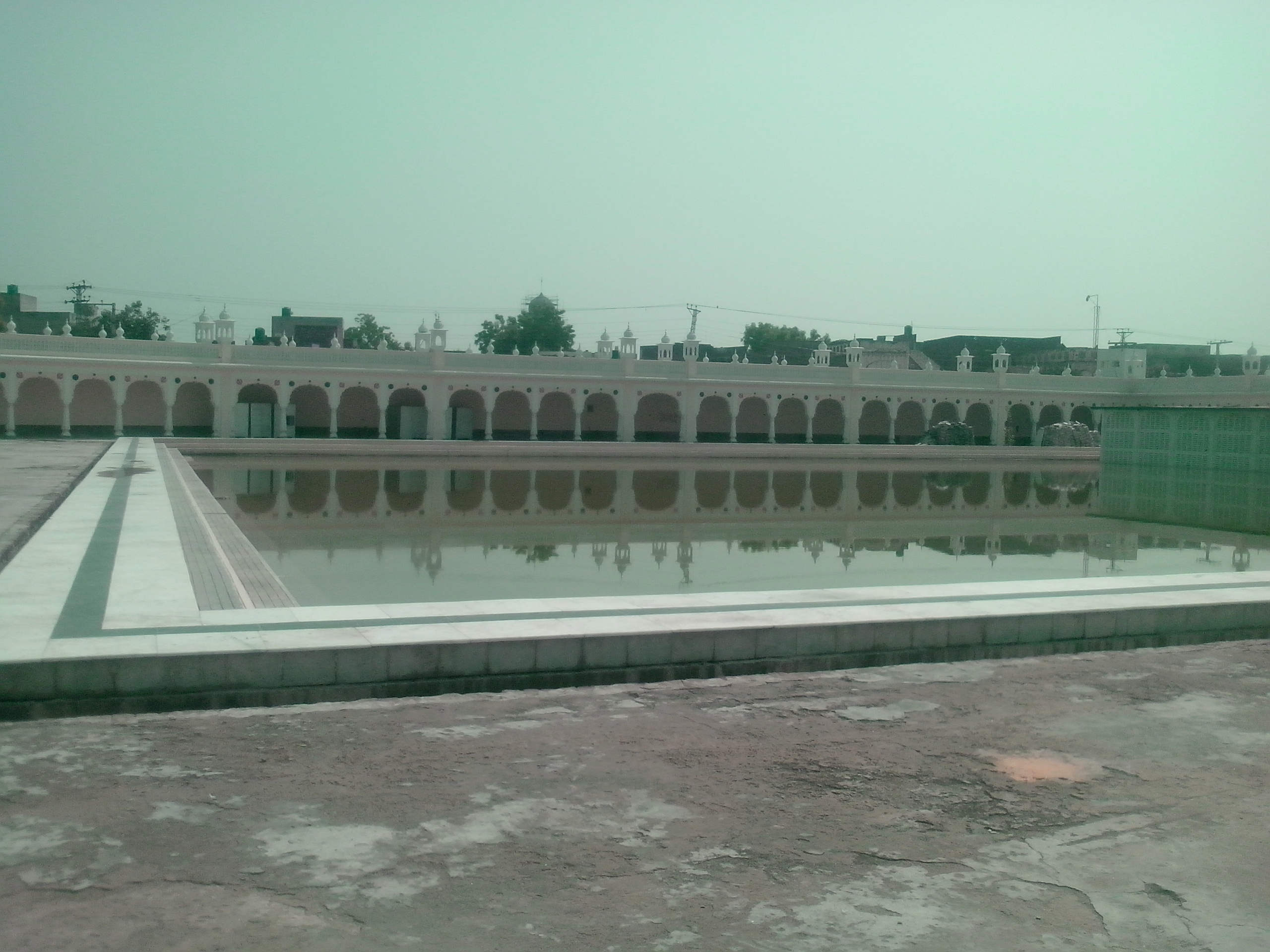
Gurdwara Janam Asthan

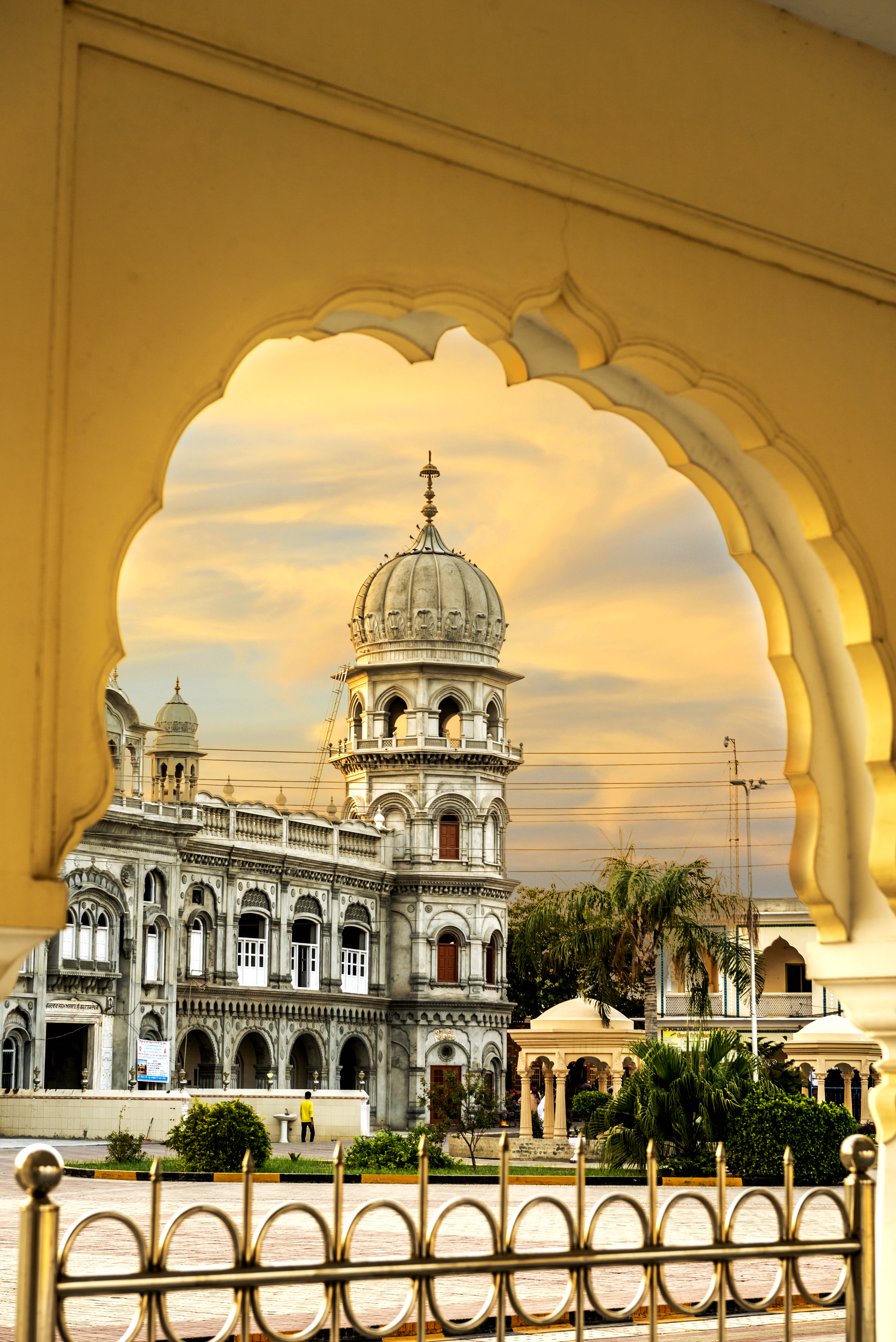
View of one of the towers of the main complex

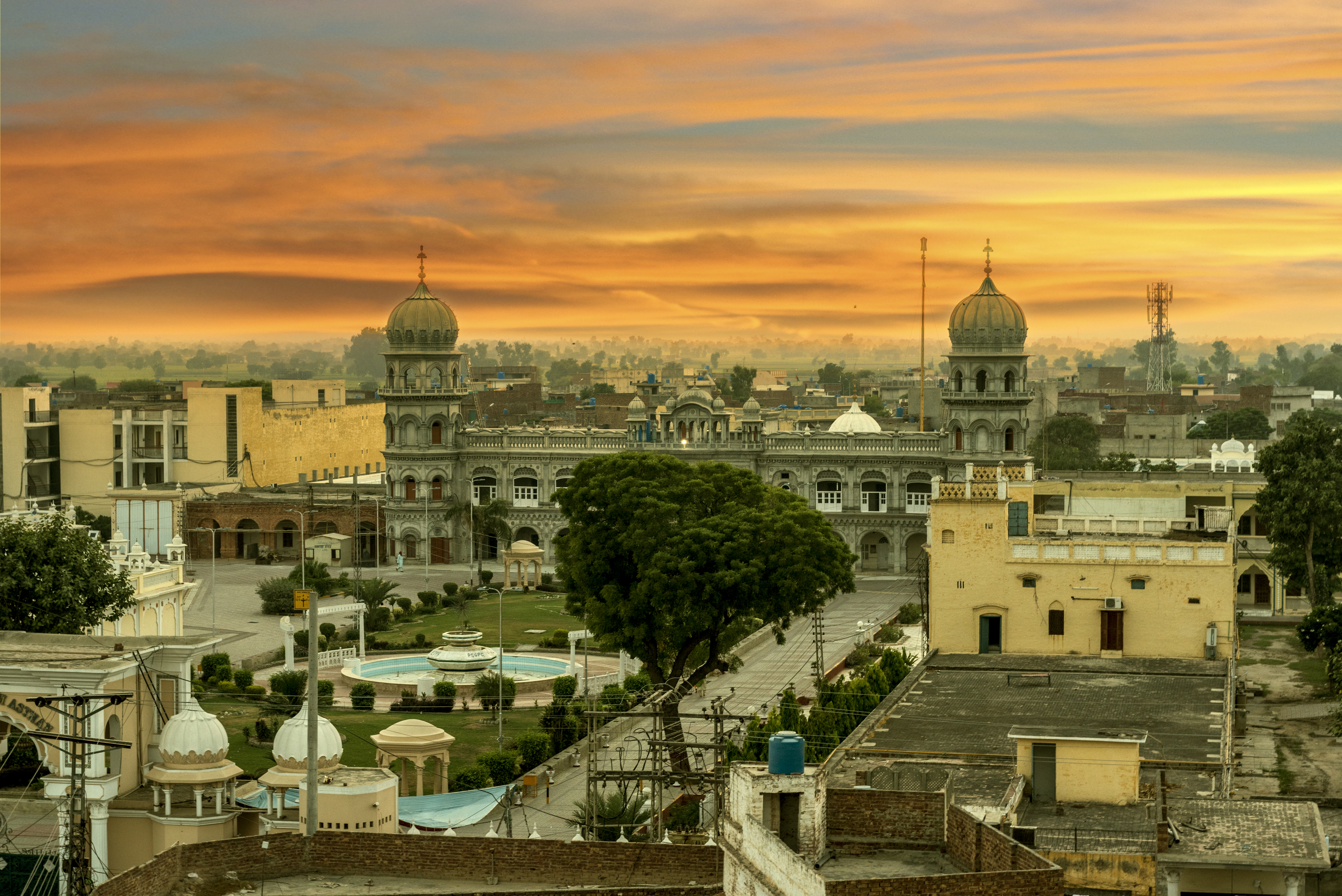
Aerial view of Janam Asthan

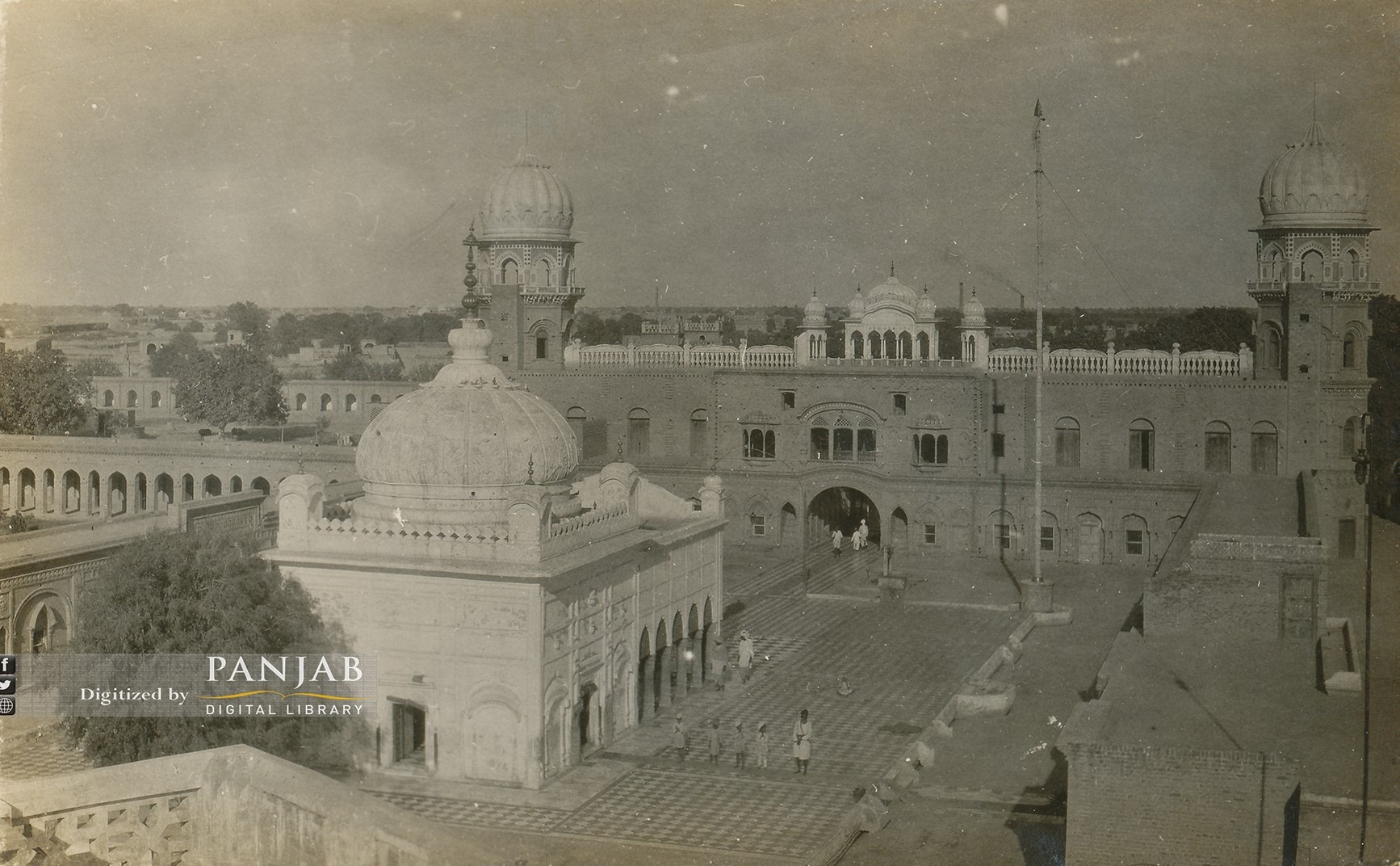
Old Photograph of Gurdwara Janam Asthan (Early 20th century)

== See also ==
- Gurdwara Darbar Sahib Kartarpur - Gurdwara built at the site where Guru Nanak died.
- Saka - The Martyrs of Nankana Sahib
- Punja Sahib
