= Barjees Tahir =

Pakistani politician (born 1948)

- برجیس طاہر
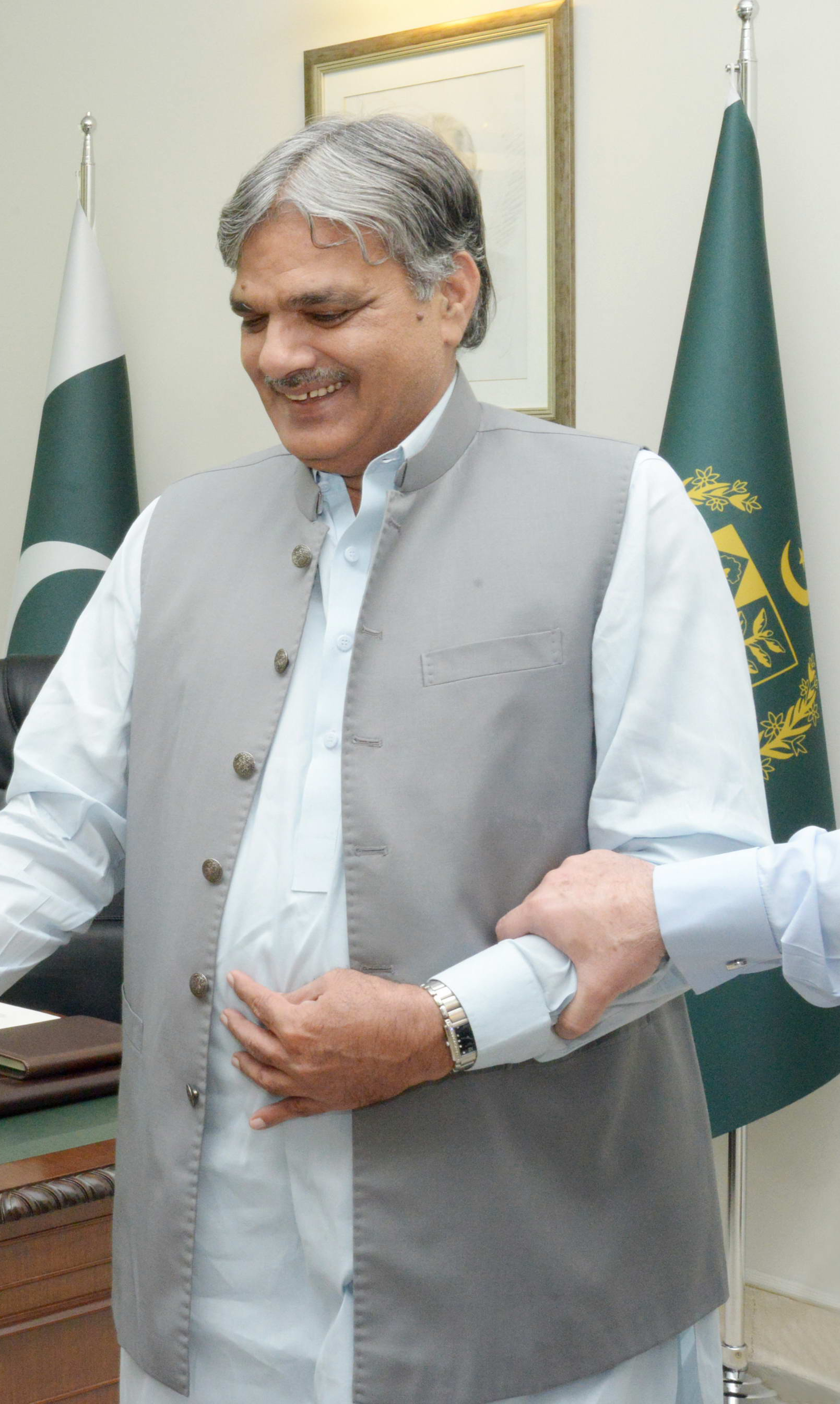

Ministry of Kashmir Affairs and Gilgit-Baltistan
- In office 4 August 2017 – 31 May 2018
- President: Mamnoon Hussain
- Prime Minister: Shahid Khaqan Abbasi
- Succeeded by: Roshan Khursheed Bharucha
- In office 13 June 2013 – 28 July 2017
- President: Mamnoon Hussain
- Prime Minister: Nawaz Sharif
- Preceded by: Mian Manzoor Ahmad Wattoo

Governor of Gilgit–Baltistan (Acting)
- In office 16 February 2015 – November 2015
- Preceded by: Karam Ali Shah

Personal details
- Born: 20 April 1949 (age 77) Sangla Hill, Punjab, Pakistan
- Other political affiliations: PMLN (1990-present)
- Education: University of Punjab

Chaudhry Muhammad Barjees Tahir (Urdu: چوہدری محمد برجیس طاہر; born 20 April 1948) is a Pakistani politician who was a member of the National Assembly of Pakistan from August 2018 till August 2023. Previously, he was a member of the National Assembly between 1990 and May 2018.

He served as Minister for Kashmir Affairs and Gilgit Baltistan in the Abbasi cabinet from August 2017 to May 2018. Previously he served as the Minister of Kashmir Affairs and Gilgit Baltistan. A member of Pakistan Muslim League (Nawaz), Tahir briefly served as Governor of Gilgit–Baltistan in 2015.

== Early life and education ==
He was born on 20 April 1948.

He graduated with masters in Law and Political Science from University of Punjab in Lahore.

== Political career ==
Tahir was elected as a member of the National Assembly of Pakistan in the 1990 Pakistani general election for the first time. He was re-elected to the National Assembly of Pakistan in the 1993 Pakistani general election. From 1990 to 1993, he served as federal parliamentary secretary in the Ministry of Interior during Nawaz Sharif first government in 1990. He was re-elected as member of the National Assembly in 1993 Pakistani general election, and again in the 1997 Pakistani general election. After the overthrow of the Pakistan Muslim League (N) government in 1999 in a coup de'tat by Pervez Musharraf, he was arrested. He was re-elected member of National Assembly in 2008 Pakistani general election.

After winning National Assembly seat in the 2013 Pakistani general election. he was made Minister of Kashmir Affairs and Northern Areas. In February 2015, he was appointed Minister for Kashmir Affairs and Gilgit-Baltistan as Governor of Gilgit-Baltistan. He had ceased to hold ministerial office in July 2017 when the federal cabinet was disbanded following the resignation of Prime Minister Nawaz Sharif after Panama Papers case decision.

Following the election of Shahid Khaqan Abbasi as Prime Minister of Pakistan in August 2017, he was inducted into the federal cabinet of Abbasi. He was appointed as the Federal Minister of Kashmir Affairs and Gilgit Baltistan. Upon the dissolution of the National Assembly on the expiration of its term on 31 May 2018, Tahir ceased to hold the office as Federal Minister for Kashmir Affairs and Gilgit-Baltistan.

He was re-elected to the National Assembly as a candidate of PML-N from Constituency NA-117 (Nankana Sahib-I) in the 2018 Pakistani general election.

He stands approximately 6 ft 2 in (188 cm) tall.

Political offices
Preceded by Manzoor Wattoo	Minister of States, Frontiers and Kashmir Affairs; 2013–present	Incumbent
