= Nankana Sahib =

Nankana Sahib ننکاݨا صاحب (Punjabi) ننكانہ صاحب (Urdu)
- City
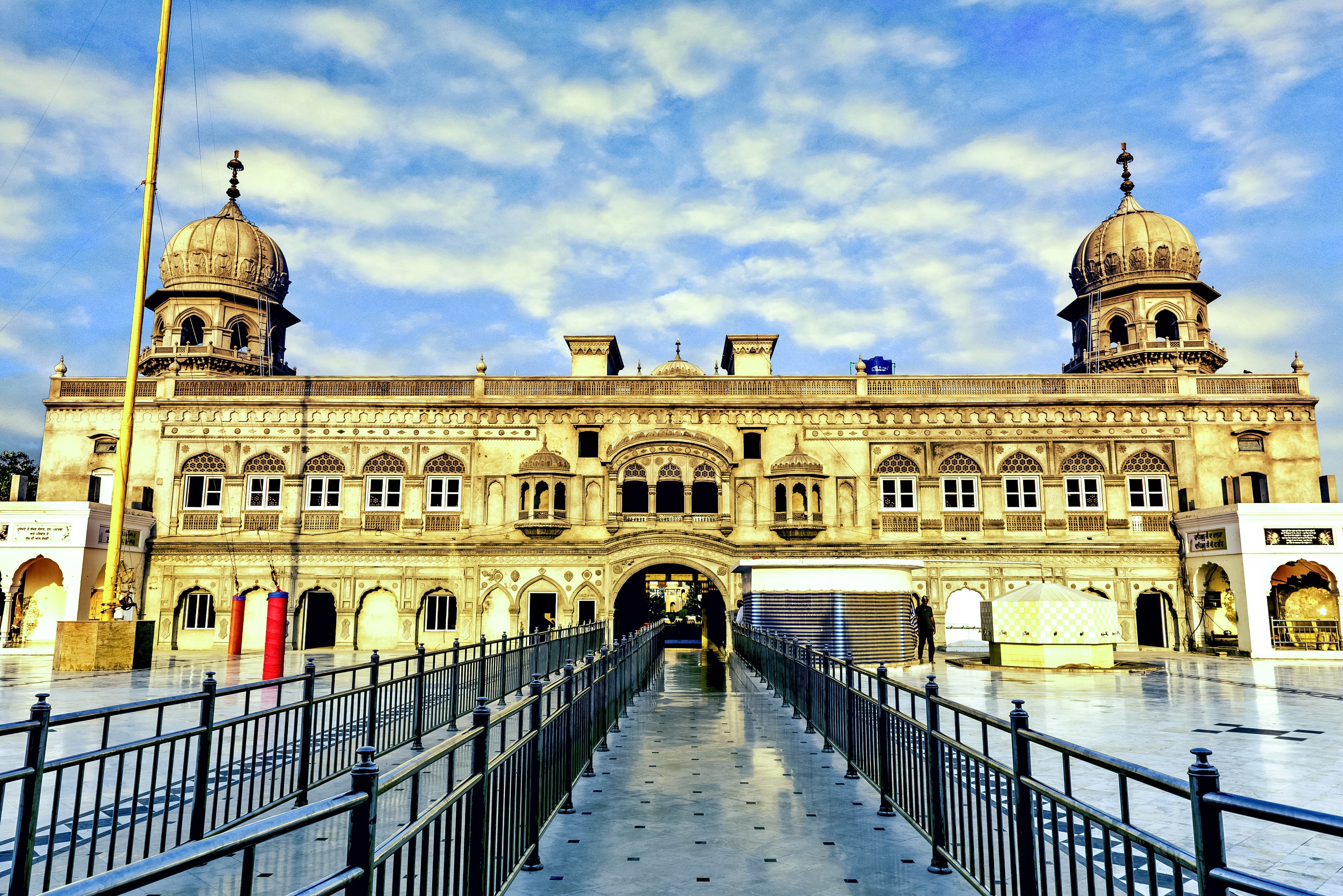
- Gurdwara Janam Asthan

- Location within Punjab, Pakistan Location within Pakistan
- Coordinates: 31°27′0″N 73°42′24″E
- Country: Pakistan
- Province: (Punjab, Pakistan) Punjab
- Division: Lahore
- District: Nankana Sahib
- Founder: Rai Bhoe Bhatti

Government
  - Type: Municipal Committee
- Elevation: 187 m (614 ft)

Population (2023)
  - City: 94,988
  - Rank: 136th in Pakistan
- District Council: 3 seats

Nankana Sahib
- Punjabi language
- Transliteration: nankāṇā sāhib
- Shahmukhi: نَنکاݨا صَاحِب
- Transliteration: nankāna ṣāḥib
- IPA: [nə̃nə̆käːɳa‿s̪äː˧ɪb]

Nankana Sahib (Note: Punjabi: ننکاݨا صاحب, romanized: Nankāṇā Sāhib; Urdu: ننکانہ صاحب, romanized: Nankāna Ṣāhib) is a city in the central part of Punjab, Pakistan, serving as the headquarters of its eponymous district. It is named after Guru Nanak, the founder of Sikhism, who was born and based here; with his birthplace gurdwara being a nationally 'Protected Heritage Monument' making Nankana Sahib among the holiest sites for Sikhs. It is located about 91 km (57 mi) west of Lahore and about 75 km (47 mi) east of Faisalabad. The city had a population of 130,041 in 2023.

Until 2005, it was a part of the Sheikhupura District.

== History ==
Originally, the locality was founded by a Hindu ruler named Raja Vairat and was originally named Raipur but it was destroyed during the Muslim conquests in the Indian subcontinent. A town on the site of the first settlement was founded during the Delhi Sultanate rule by Rai Bhoi, a Rajput of Bhati stock whose Hindu ancestor had converted to Islam under the influence of Sufism, and thus was known as Rai-Bhoi-Di-Talwandi. His great-grand son Rai Bular Bhatti, renamed it as 'Nankana Sahib' after the birth of Guru Nanak. Talwandi Rai Bhoe had been a deserted and abandoned habitation until Diwan Kaura Mal sponsored the construction of holy-tanks (sarovars) and memorial gurdwaras there in 1750, which had generous land holdings given to them by Kaura Mal, which formed the estate of Nankana Sahib until partition of Punjab in 1947. The Gurdwara Nankana Sahib, originally constructed by the Sikhs during the Mughal-era in around 1600 CE was renovated in 1819–20 CE by the Sikh Maharaja Ranjit Singh.

During the Akali movement, on 20 February 1921, Narain Das, the Udasi mahant (clergy) of the gurdwara at Nankana Sahib, ordered his men to fire on Akali protesters, leading to the Nankana massacre. The firing was widely condemned, and an agitation was launched until the control of this historic Janam Asthan Gurdwara was restored to the Sikhs. Again in the 1930s and 1940s the Sikhs added more buildings and more architectural design.

== Geography ==
Nankana Sahib and it surroundings were formerly a tehsil of Sheikhupura District. In May 2005, the provincial government raised the status of Nankana Sahib to a district for promoting development in the area. The present District has three tehsils: Nankana Sahib, Shah Kot, and Sangla Hill. Before December 2008, District Nankana Sahib also included Safdarabad Tehsil.

There are plans to construct a 100 acres (40 ha) university as well as hospitals and health care facilities by the district government with mutual interest of local communities and family of Rai Bular.

In 2007, the Pakistan government announced a plan to set up a university on Sikh religion and culture at Nankana Sahib, the birthplace of Guru Nanak. Chairman of Pakistan's Evacuee Trust Property Board (ETPB), Gen (R) Zulfikar Ali Khan, said that "The international Guru Nanak University planned at Nankana Sahib would have the best architecture, curricula and research centre on Sikh religion and culture".

== Demographics ==
Population

Historical population
Year	Pop.	±% p.a.
1972	25,703	—
1981	32,963	+2.80%
1998	48,899	+2.35%
2017	79,458	+2.59%
2023	94,988	+3.02%

According to the 2023 census, Nankana Sahib city has a population of 94,988.

Religions

Religion in Khyber Nankana Sahib (2023)
Religion	Percent
Islam	96.9%
Sikhism	1.44%
Christianity	1.33%
Others	0.32%

The partition of India and Pakistan significantly changed the demographic composition of Pakistan's cities with the vast majority of Hindus and Sikhs having to leave Pakistan and vice versa for Muslims in India. The 2023 Pakistani Census however showed that while still overwhelmingly Muslim at 97%, there is now a re-established Sikh community in the holy city their founder was born in. This can be attributed to the migration of Sikhs to the city fleeing from the Taliban insurgency in Khyber Pakhtunkhwa.

Data from the 2023 census shows that the city of Nankana Sahib has a Sikh population of 1,875 out of a total population of 130,041. Nankana Sahib is the only city in Pakistan where Sikhs are the largest minority religion comprising just under 1.5% of the population. There is also a significant Christian population of 1,734 in the city making up 1.3% of the population.

Languages

Languages of Nankana Sahib (2023 Census)
1. Punjabi (96.1%)
2. Urdu (2.50%)
3. Pashto (0.80%)
4. Others (0.60%)

The city is overwhelmingly Punjabi speaking, with Punjabi speakers comprising over 96.3% of the population. 2.5% also stated Urdu as their mother tongue.

The average household size in 2023 was 6.3 per household while the 2017-2023 average annual growth rate was 2.82%.

== Notable places ==
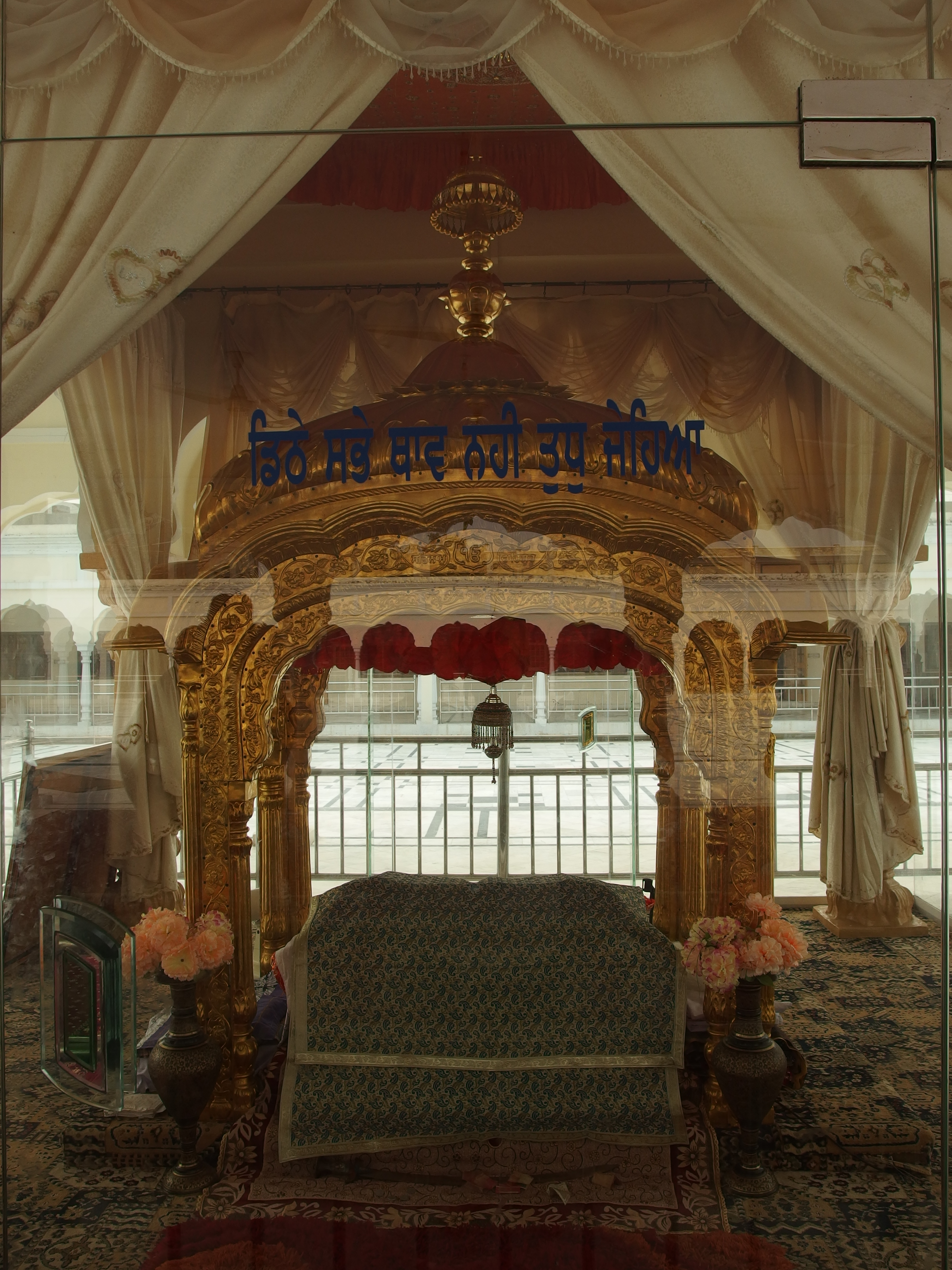
Gurdwara Nankana Sahib

- Quba Masjid (A replica of Quba Masjid of Madina)
- Gurdwara Janam Asthan
- Nankana Lake Resort
- Residency of Baba Guru Nanak
- Gurdwara Patti Sahib
- Gurdwara Bal Leela
- Gurdwara Mal Ji Sahib
- Gurdwara Kiara Sahib
- Gurdwara Tambu Sahib

And other historical Gurdwaras of Sikhism.

== Education ==
=== Universities/Higher Education Institutes ===
- Virtual University of Pakistan Nankana Sahib Campus
- Baba Guru Nanak University

=== Education ===
Nankana Sahib is home to several educational institutions, including:

- Government College of Commerce, Nankana Sahib
- Government G.N. Degree College, Nankana Sahib
- Government G.N. Degree College for Women, Nankana Sahib
- Punjab Group of Colleges, Nankana Sahib
- Superior College, Nankana Sahib

=== Schools ===
Nankana Sahib is home to several schools. A notable institution is:

- Allied Schools (Pakistan)

== Notable people ==
- Rai Bular Bhatti
- Abrar Hassan
- Mohammad Irfan, Pakistani cricketer
- Rai Mansab Ali Khan
- Rai Rashid Ahmed Khan
- Shezra Mansab Ali Khan
- Guru Nanak, founder and first of the Sikh Gurus
- Ganga Ram
- Ijaz Ahmed Shah
- Babra Sharif, film actor
- Barjees Tahir

== See also ==
- Sikhism in Pakistan
- Gurdwara Janam Asthan
- Gurdwara Darbar Sahib Kartarpur
- Harmandir Sahib
- Gurudwara Sis Ganj Sahib
