= Nankana Sahib Tehsil =

Nankana Sahib Tehsil تحصيل ننكانہ صاحب تحصیل ننکاݨا صاحب
- Tehsil of Punjab
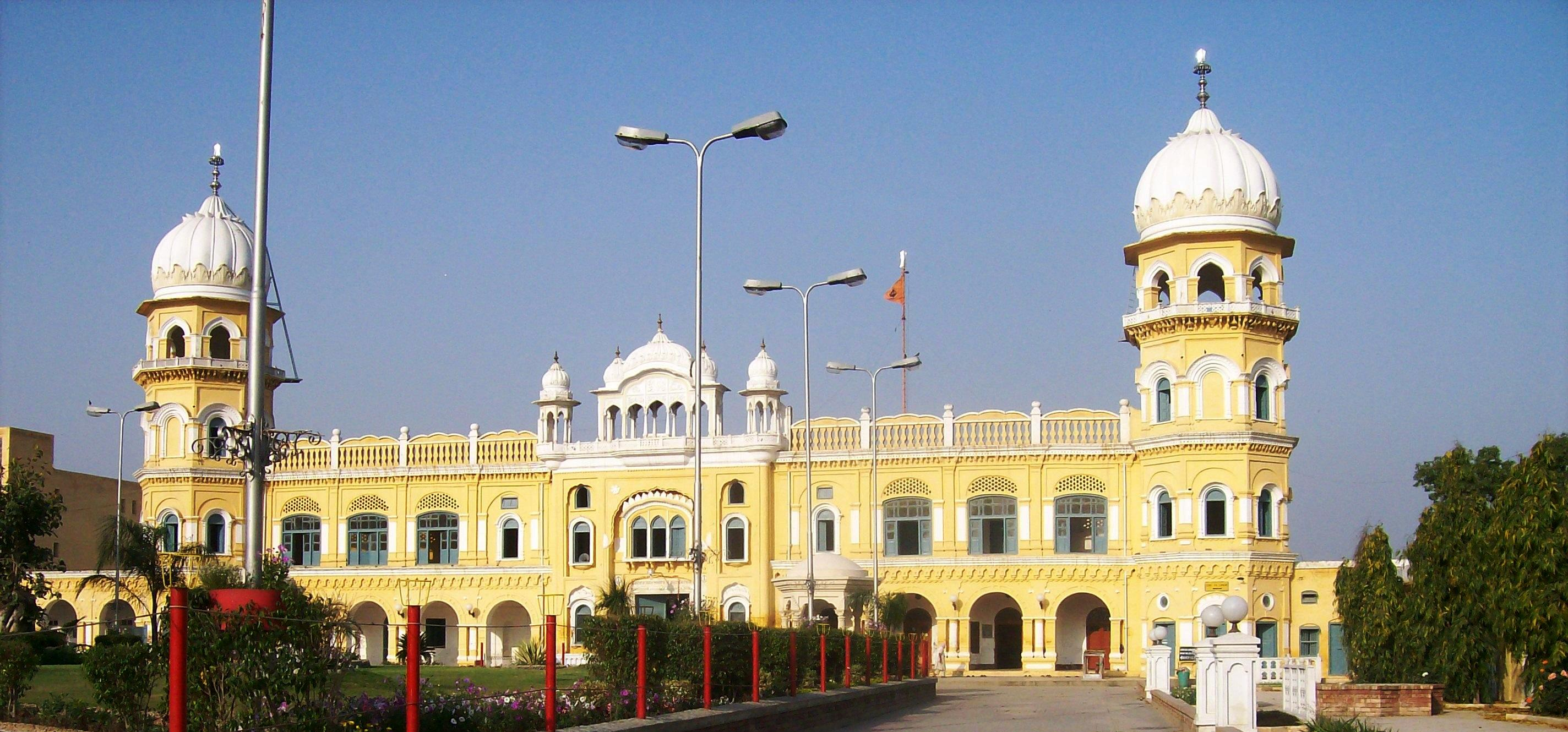

- Location within Punjab, Pakistan Location within Pakistan
- Coordinates: 31.447500°N 73.697197°E
- Country: Pakistan
- Province: (Punjab, Pakistan) Punjab
- District: Nankana Sahib
- Elevation: 187 m (614 ft)

Population (2017)
  - Tehsil of Punjab: 883,876
  - Urban: 110,278
  - Rural: 773,598
- Time zone: UTC+5 (PST)

Nankana Sahib Tehsil (Punjabi: تحصیل ننکاݨا صاحب , Urdu: تحصیل ننكانہ صاحب), is an administrative subdivision (tehsil) of Nankana Sahib District in the Punjab province of Pakistan. The city of Nankana Sahib is the headquarters of the tehsil, until 2005 it was a tehsil of Sheikhupura District, but in that year Sheikhupura was bifurcated and the district of Nankana Sahib was created.
