= Nankana Sahib District =

District in Punjab, Pakistan

Nankana Sahib ضلع ننکاݨا صاحب ضِلع ننكانہ صاحِب
- District of Punjab
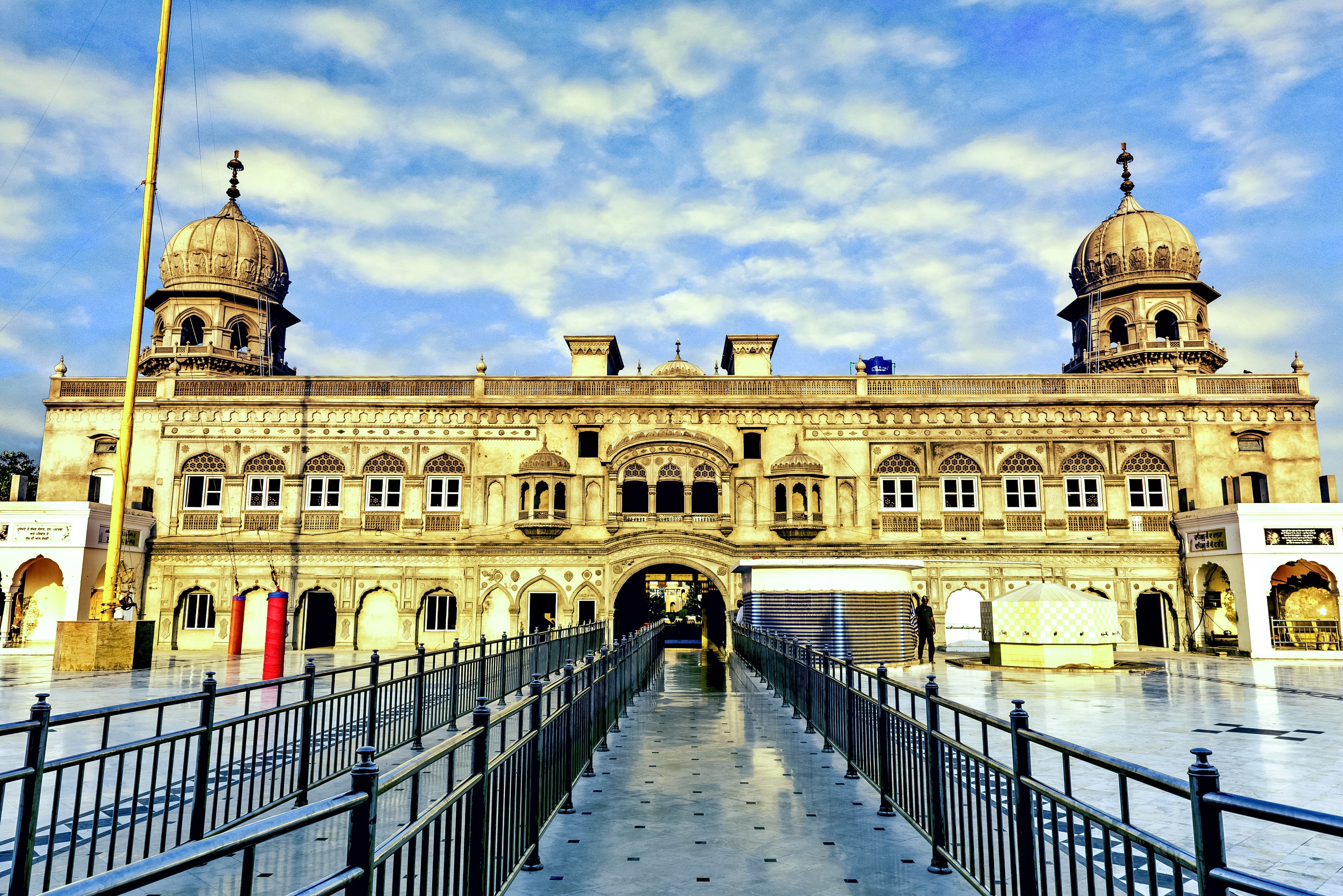
- Gurdwara Janam Asthan, Nankana Sahib

- Map of Nankana Sahib District
- Coordinates: 31.449561°N 73.70648°E
- Country: Pakistan
- Province: Punjab
- Division: Lahore
- Established: May 2005
- Headquarters: Nankana Sahib

Government
  - Type: District Administration
  - Deputy Commissioner: Rana Hameed
  - District Police Officer: N/A
  - District Health Officer: N/A

Area
  - District of Punjab: 2,216 km^{2} (856 sq mi)

Population (2023)
  - District of Punjab: 1,634,871
  - Density: 737.8/km^{2} (1,911/sq mi)
  - Urban: 323,388
  - Rural: 1,311,483

Literacy
  - Literacy rate: Total: (63.12%); Male: (68.38%); Female: (57.63%)
- Time zone: UTC+5 (PST)
- Area code: 04941
- Tehsils: 3
- Website: nankana.punjab.gov.pk

Nankana Sahib District (Note: Punjabi: ضلع ننکاݨا صاحب; Urdu: ضِلع ننكانہ صاحِب) is a district within the Lahore Division of Punjab, Pakistan. Nankana Sahib is the seat of the district government, and Shahkot is the largest urban center. The district of Nankana Sahib is located about 75 kilometres (47 mi) west of Lahore and about 53 kilometres (33 mi) east of Faisalabad. Until 2005, it was part of Sheikhupura District.

== Administration ==
The district is administratively subdivided into three tehsils.

Tehsil	Area (km^{2})	Pop. (2023)	Density (ppl/km^{2}) (2023)	Literacy rate (2023)	Union Councils
Sangla Hill	223	269,993	1,210.73	72.08%	...
Nankana Sahib	1,662	1,065,063	640.83	59.02%	...
Shah Kot	331	299,815	905.79	69.28%	...

== Demographics ==
=== Population ===
Historical population
Year	Pop.	±% p.a.
1998	1,044,865	—
2017	1,354,986	+1.38%
2023	1,634,871	+3.18%

As of the 2023 census, Nankana Sahib district has 246,956 households and a population of 1,634,871. The district has a sex ratio of 103.62 males to 100 females and a literacy rate of 63.12%: 68.38% for males and 57.63% for females. 428,600 (26.22% of the surveyed population) are under 10 years of age. 323,388 (19.78%) live in urban areas.

=== Religion ===
Religion in Nankana Sahib district (2023)
Religion	Percent
Islam	96.67%
Christianity	2.98%
Other	0.35%

Religion in contemporary Nankana Sahib District
Religious group	1941		2017		2023	
Religious group	Pop.	%	Pop.	%	Pop.	%
Islam	216,302	68.90%	1,310,044	96.68%	1,580,448	96.67%
Sikhism	51,430	16.38%	—N/a	—N/a	1,887	0.12%
Hinduism	32,804	10.45%	245	0.02%	1,196	0.07%
Christianity	13,317	4.24%	40,290	2.97%	48,741	2.98%
Ahmadiyya	—N/a	—N/a	2,752	0.20%	1,979	0.12%
Others	71	0.03%	1,655	0.13%	620	0.04%
Total Population	313,924	100%	1,354,986	100%	1,634,871	100%
Note: 1941 census data is for Nankana Sahib and part of Sheikupura tehsils of erstwhile Sheikhupura district, which roughly corresponds to contemporary Nankana Sahib district. Current ratio of population of Sangla Hill and Shahkot tehsils (which were split from Sheikhupura tehsil) to current borders of erstwhile Sheikhupura tehsil were used to estimate 1941 population of rural areas currently in Nankana Sahib district. Sangla Hill town was added separately and rural areas were assumed to have a uniform distribution of religions. District and tehsil borders have changed since 1941.

=== Languages ===
Languages of Nankana Sahib district (2023)
1. Punjabi (97.2%)
2. Urdu (1.88%)
3. Others (0.88%)

At the time of the 2023 census, 97.24% of the population spoke Punjabi and 1.88% Urdu as their first language.

== Education ==
District Nankana Sahib is ranked 26th on the education score index of the Pakistan District Education Rankings 2017 published by Alif Ailaan. The overall education score is composed of the learning score, retention score and gender parity score.

In the middle school infrastructure score index, which focuses on availability of basic facilities and the building condition of schools, Nankana Sahib ranks 51st. The facilities of electricity and drinking water in schools remain very good in the district with a 100% score. However, the building conditions are below average with a score of 45.07.

On the TaleemDo! App, the majority of residents in several areas within Nankana Sahib district have complained about a shortage of school teachers, as well as a lack of access to available transport to schools located further away. This issue is reported by a majority of female students.

== District development ==
The possibility of the development of a university, named after Guru Nanak, has been raised.

The Punjab government decided to link Nankana Sahib District with the provincial capital, Lahore. With these plans the Punjab government is completing "Khanqah Dogran Interchange" (on the M-2) very swiftly, which is a helpful project to develop the newly created District of Nankana Sahib. This will also give access to the Grand Trunk Road, which leads to the Indian Punjab from the Wagah border. Nankana Sahib-Amritsar bus was inaugurated by Ex-Prime Minister of India Manmohan Singh.
