= NA-114 Sheikhupura-II =

Constituency of the National Assembly of Pakistan

- Constituency for the National Assembly of Pakistan
- Region: Sharak Pur Tehsil, Ferozewala Tehsil (partly) including Ferozewala city (partly) and Kot Abdul Malik city and Sheikhupura Tehsil (partly) of Sheikhupura District
- Electorate: 377,354

Current constituency
- Created: 2018
- Party: Pakistan Muslim League (N)
- Member: Rana Tanveer Hussain
- Created from: NA-132 (Sheikhupura-II-cum-Nankana Sahib); NA-133 (Sheikhupura-III); NA-136 Nankana Sahib-II-cum-Sheikhupura

NA-114 Sheikhupura-II (این اے-114، شيخوپوره-2) is a constituency for the National Assembly of Pakistan.

== Area ==
During the delimitation of 2018, NA-120 (Sheikhupura-II) acquired areas from three former constituencies namely NA-132 (Sheikhupura-II-cum-Nankana Sahib), NA-133 (Sheikhupura-III), and NA-136 Nankana Sahib-II-cum-Sheikhupura, the areas of Sheikhupura District which are part of this constituency are listed below alongside the former constituency name from which they were acquired:

Areas acquired from NA-132 Sheikhupura-II-cum-Nankana Sahib

- Sharak Pur Tehsil
- Following areas of Ferozewala Tehsil
  - Kot Abdul Malik
  - Abul Khair (excluding Galo and Kala)
  - Kot Pindi Das (excluding Khanpur, Mandiali and Chak No. 46)
  - Wandala Dial Shah
  - Faizpur Khurd

Areas acquired from NA-133 (Sheikhupura-III)

- Following areas of Ferozewala Tehsil
  - Galo
  - Kala
  - Khanpur
  - Mandiali
- Following areas of Sheikhupura Tehsil
  - Mudke
  - Muradey Kalan
  - Ghazi Androon
  - Noor Pur Virkan

Areas acquired from NA-136 Nankana Sahib-II-cum-Sheikhupura

- Following areas of Sheikhupura Tehsil
  - Baharianwala (excluding Mudke, Muradey Kalan, Ghazi Androon, Noor Pur Virkan, Sahuki Malian, and Jevanpur Kalan)
  - Malowal
  - Bahuman
  - Hoeke

== Members of Parliament ==
=== 2018–2023: NA-120 Sheikhupura-II ===
Election	Member	Party
2018	Rana Tanveer Hussain	PML (N)

=== 2024–present: NA-114 Sheikhupura-II ===
Election	Member	Party
2024	Rana Tanveer Hussain	PML (N)

== Election 2018 ==
General elections were held on 25 July 2018.

General election 2018: NA-120 Sheikhupura-II
Party	Candidate	Votes	%	±%
PML(N)	Rana Tanveer Hussain	99,674	46.08	
PTI	Ali Asghar Manda	74,165	34.29	
TLP	Syed Afzaal Hussain Rizvi	35,453	16.39	
Others	Others (six candidates)	7,003	3.24	
Turnout		223,948	59.35	
Total valid votes		216,295	96.58	
Rejected ballots		7,653	3.42	
Majority		25,509	11.79	
Registered electors		377,354		
PML(N) hold		Swing	N/A	

== Election 2024 ==
General elections were held on 8 February 2024. Rana Tanveer Hussain won the election with 101,111 votes.

General election 2024: NA-114 Sheikhupura-II
Party	Candidate	Votes	%	±%
PML(N)	Rana Tanveer Hussain	101,111	44.23	▼1.85
PTI	Arshad Mehmood Chaudhry (Note: Filed nomination papers as PTI candidate but ECP allowed him to run as an Independent)	82,026	35.88	▲1.59
TLP	Asif Mehmood	37,329	16.33	▼0.06
Others	Others (eighteen candidates)	8,134	3.56	
Turnout		233,516	51.92	▼7.43
Total valid votes		228,600	97.89	
Rejected ballots		4,916	2.11	
Majority		19,085	8.35	▼3.44
Registered electors		449,737		
PML(N) hold		Swing	N/A	

== See also ==
- NA-113 Sheikhupura-I
- NA-115 Sheikhupura-III
