= NA-132 (Sheikhupura-II-cum-Nankana Sahib) =

Former constituency of the National Assembly of Pakistan, 2002 to 2018

- Former constituency for the National Assembly of Pakistan
- Region: Sharak Pur Tehsil, Ferozewala Tehsil, Muridke Tehsil and Nankana Sahib Tehsil

Former constituency
- Abolished: 2018
- Replaced by: NA-118 (Nankana Sahib-II), NA-119 (Sheikhupura-I) and NA-120 (Sheikhupura-II)

NA-132 (Sheikhupura-II-cum-Nankana Sahib) was a constituency of the National Assembly of Pakistan, located in Sheikhupura District and Nankana Sahib District, Punjab. It existed from 2002 to 2018 and covered Sharak Pur Tehsil, parts of Ferozewala Tehsil and Muridke Tehsil in Sheikhupura District, and parts of Nankana Sahib Tehsil in Nankana Sahib District. Following the 2018 delimitation, the constituency was abolished and its area was redistributed across NA-118 (Nankana Sahib-II), NA-119 (Sheikhupura-I) and NA-120 (Sheikhupura-II).

== Area ==
The constituency covered the following administrative areas:

- Sharak Pur Tehsil, Sheikhupura District
- The following areas of Ferozewala Tehsil, Sheikhupura District:
  - Kot Abdul Malik
  - Abul Khair (excluding Galo and Kala)
  - Kot Pindi Das (excluding Khanpur, Mandiali and Chak No. 46)
  - Wandala Dial Shah
  - Faizpur Khurd
- The following area of Muridke Tehsil, Sheikhupura District:
  - Chuhe Wali Kalan
- The following areas of Nankana Sahib Tehsil, Nankana Sahib District:
  - Jawahar Pur (excluding Mauza Madhodas)
  - Mirza Pur

== Members of Parliament ==
Election	Member	Party
2002	Mian Jalil Ahmad Sharaqpuri	PML-N
2008	Rana Tanveer Hussain	PML-N
2013	Rana Tanveer Hussain	PML-N

== 2002 general election ==
General elections were held on 10 October 2002. Mian Jalil Ahmad Sharaqpuri of PML-N won the seat with 51,159 votes.

General election 2002: NA-132 Sheikhupura-II
Party	Candidate	Votes	%	±%
PML(N)	Mian Jalil Ahmad Sharaqpuri	51,159	50.31	
PML(Q)	Mian Muhammad Azhir	41,224	40.54	
PPP	Sajid Ali Awan	8,514	8.37	
Others	Others (four candidates)	784	0.78	
Turnout		104,142	41.36	
Total valid votes		101,681	97.64	
Rejected ballots		2,461	2.36	
Majority		9,935	9.77	
Registered electors		251,788		

== 2008 general election ==
General elections were held on 18 February 2008. Rana Tanveer Hussain of PML-N won the seat with 48,193 votes.

General election 2008: NA-132 Sheikhupura-II
Party	Candidate	Votes	%	±%
PML(N)	Rana Tanveer Hussain	48,193	44.58	
PPP	Syed Ghayoor Abbas Bukhari	34,084	31.53	
PML(Q)	Shahid Manzoor Gill	24,260	22.44	
Others	Others (eight candidates)	1,570	1.45	
Turnout		113,219	49.34	
Total valid votes		108,107	95.49	
Rejected ballots		5,112	4.51	
Majority		14,109	13.05	
Registered electors		229,477		

== 2013 general election ==
General elections were held on 11 May 2013. Rana Tanveer Hussain of PML-N retained the seat with 93,140 votes.

General election 2013: NA-132 Sheikhupura-II
Party	Candidate	Votes	%	±%
PML(N)	Rana Tanveer Hussain	93,140	58.13	
PPP	Syed Ghayoor Abbas Bukhari	33,439	20.87	
PTI	Ayaz Sarfraz Malik	16,467	10.28	
Independent	Rana Anwar ul Haq	10,252	6.40	
JI	Riaz Ahmad Bhulla	3,573	2.23	
Others	Others (eighteen candidates)	3,367	2.09	
Turnout		165,616	56.87	
Total valid votes		160,238	96.75	
Rejected ballots		5,378	3.25	
Majority		59,701	37.26	
Registered electors		291,232		
