= NA-113 Sheikhupura-I =

Constituency of the National Assembly of Pakistan

- Constituency for the National Assembly of Pakistan
- Region: Muridke Tehsil and Ferozewala Tehsil (partly) including Ferozewala city of Sheikhupura District
- Electorate: 418,637

Current constituency
- Created: 2018
- Party: Pakistan Muslim League (N)
- Member: Rana Ahmed Ateeq Anwar
- Created from: NA-131 Sheikhupura-I; NA-132 (Sheikhupura-II-cum-Nankana Sahib); NA-133 (Sheikhupura-III)

NA-113 Sheikhupura-I (این اے-113، شيخوپوره-١) is a constituency for the National Assembly of Pakistan.

== Area ==
During the delimitation of 2018, NA-119 Sheikhupura-I acquired areas from three former constituencies namely NA-131 Sheikhupura-I, NA-132 (Sheikhupura-II-cum-Nankana Sahib), and NA-133 (Sheikhupura-III) with most areas coming from NA-131 (Sheikhupura-I). Muridke Tehsil was previously divided in all these three constituencies which is now entirely part of NA-119 (Sheikhupura-I). Apart from that, areas of Ferozewala Tehsil which were previously part of NA-131 (Sheikhupura-I) have been made part of this constituency. Those areas include Chak No. 46 Union Council among others.

== Members of Parliament ==
=== 2018–2023: NA-119 Sheikhupura-I ===
Election	Member	Party
2018	Rahat Amanullah	PTI

=== 2024–present: NA-113 Sheikhupura-I ===
Election	Member	Party
2024	Rana Ahmed Ateeq Anwar	PML(N)

== Election 2002 ==
General elections were held on 10 October 2002. Brig(R) Zulfiqar Ahmad of PML-Q won by 41,699 votes.

General election 2002: NA-131 Sheikhupura-I
Party	Candidate	Votes	%	±%
PML(Q)	Zulfiqar Ahmad Dhillon	41,699	39.84	
PML(N)	Rana Tanveer Hussain	35,469	33.89	
PPP	Nisar Ahmad Pannoun	24,426	23.34	
Independent	Rana Afzaal Hussain	3,075	2.93	
Turnout		108,516	42.15	
Total valid votes		104,669	96.46	
Rejected ballots		3,847	3.54	
Majority		6,230	5.95	
Registered electors		257,446		

== Election 2008 ==
General elections were held on 18 February 2008. Rana Tanveer Hussain of PML-N won by 50,638 votes.

General election 2008: NA-131 Sheikhupura-I
Party	Candidate	Votes	%	±%
PML(N)	Rana Tanveer Hussain	50,638	43.62	
PML(Q)	Zulfiqar Ahmad Dhillon	40,898	35.23	
PPP	Ch. Mushtaq Ahmad	23,506	20.25	
Others	Others (five candidates)	1,043	0.90	
Turnout		120,299	55.35	
Total valid votes		116,085	96.50	
Rejected ballots		4,214	3.50	
Majority		9,740	8.39	
Registered electors		217,332		
PML(N) gain from PML(Q)				

== By-Election 2008 ==
By-Election 2008: NA-131 Sheikhupura-I
Party	Candidate	Votes	%	±%
PML(N)	Rana Afzaal Hussain	119,180	96.75	
PML(Q)	Zulfiqar Ahmad Dhillon	2,587	2.10	
Others	Others (seven candidates)	1,419	1.15	
Turnout		124,286	56.21	
Total valid votes		123,186	99.12	
Rejected ballots		1,100	0.88	
Majority		116,593	94.65	
Registered electors		217,332		
PML(N) hold				

== Election 2013 ==
General elections were held on 11 May 2013. Rana Afzal Hussain of PML-N won by 73,742 votes and became a member of the National Assembly.

General election 2013: NA-131 Sheikhupura-I
Party	Candidate	Votes	%	±%
PML(N)	Rana Afzaal Hussain	73,742	48.44	
Independent	Umer Aftab Dhillon	41,574	27.31	
PTI	Rahat Aman Ullah Bhatti	21,637	14.21	
PML(Q)	Muhtarma Amna Zulifqar Dhillon	11,558	7.59	
Others	Others (eight candidates)	3,732	2.45	
Turnout		156,931	57.28	
Total valid votes		152,243	97.01	
Rejected ballots		4,688	2.99	
Majority		32,168	21.13	
Registered electors		273,993		
PML(N) hold				

== Election 2018 ==
General elections were held on 25 July 2018.

General election 2018: NA-119 Sheikhupura-I
Party	Candidate	Votes	%	±%
PTI	Rahat Amanullah	110,231	47.99	
PML(N)	Rana Afzaal Hussain	94,072	40.96	
Others	Others (four candidates)	25,384	11.05	
Turnout		234,618	56.04	
Total valid votes		229,687	97.90	
Rejected ballots		4,931	2.10	
Majority		16,159	7.03	
Registered electors		418,637		
PTI gain from PML(N)				

== Election 2024 ==
General elections were held on 8 February 2024. Rana Ahmed Ateeq Anwar won the election with 119,407 votes.

General election 2024: NA-113 Sheikhupura-I
Party	Candidate	Votes	%	±%
PML(N)	Rana Ahmed Ateeq Anwar	119,407	46.10	▲5.14
PTI	Rahat Amanullah (Note: Filed nomination papers as PTI candidate but ECP allowed him to run as an Independent)	90,872	35.09	▼12.90
TLP	Muhammad Noman Khalid	26,257	10.14	▲0.78
Others	Others (twelve candidates)	22,457	8.67	
Turnout		266,842	49.88	▼6.16
Total valid votes		258,993	97.06	
Rejected ballots		7,849	2.94	
Majority		28,535	11.02	
Registered electors		534,981		
PML(N) gain from PTI				

== See also ==
- NA-112 Nankana Sahib-II
- NA-114 Sheikhupura-II
