= PP-139 Sheikhupura-IV =

Provincial constituency in Punjab, Pakistan

- Constituency for the Provincial Assembly of Punjab
- Region: Ferozewala Tehsil (partly) including Kot Abdul Malik city of Sheikhupura District

Current constituency
- Created from: PP-164 Sheikhupura-III (2002-2018); PP-138 Sheikhupura-IV (2018-2023)

PP-139 Sheikhupura-IV (پی پی-139، شيخوپورہ-4) is a Constituency of Provincial Assembly of Punjab.

== By-election December 2024 ==
A by-election was on 5 December 2024 due to the death of Rana Afzaal Hussain, the previous MPA from this seat. Rana Tahir Iqbal won the election with 44,535 votes.

By-election December 2024: PP-139 Sheikhupura-IV
Party	Candidate	Votes	%	±%
PML(N)	Rana Tahir Iqbal	44,535	56.64	▼0.36
PTI	Ijaz Hussain Bhatti	20,093	25.55	▼10.95
TLP	Muhammad Farooq Ul Hassan	7,196	9.15	▲3.16
Independent	Mian Abdul Rauf	6,695	8.51	New
Others	Others (four candidates)	115	0.15	
Turnout		80,019	41.40	▼2.50
Total valid votes		78,634	98.27	
Rejected ballots		1,385	1.73	
Majority		24,442	31.09	▲10.59
Registered electors		193,285		
PML(N) hold				

== By-election April 2024 ==
A by-election was held on 21 April 2024 due to Rana Tanveer Hussain vacating this seat. Rana Afzaal Hussain won the election with 45,679 votes.

2024 Pakistani by-elections: PP-139 Sheikhupura-IV
Party	Candidate	Votes	%	±%
PML(N)	Rana Afzaal Hussain	45,679	57.00	▲17.57
SIC	Ijaz Hussain Bhatti	28,569	36.50	▼0.75
TLP	Rafaqat Ali	4,899	5.99	▼12.62
Others	Others (three candidates)	412	0.50	
Turnout		83,055	43.90	▼6.04
Total valid votes		81,729	98.40	
Rejected ballots		1,326	1.60	
Majority		16,752	20.50	▲18.32
Registered electors		189,205		
PML(N) hold				

== General elections 2024 ==
Provincial elections were held on 8 February 2024. Rana Tanveer Hussain won the election with 35,659 votes.

Provincial election 2024: PP-139 Sheikhupura-IV
Party	Candidate	Votes	%	±%
PML(N)	Rana Tanveer Hussain	35,659	39.43	▼2.69
Independent	Ijaz Hussain Bhatti (Note: Filed as a candidate of PTI, but Election Commission of Pakistan allowed him to contest as independent)	33,685	37.25	▲11.47
TLP	Rafaqat Ali	16,829	18.61	▲3.65
Independent	Sultan Mehmood Bhatti	1,658	1.83	
Others	Others (eighteen candidates)	2,610	2.88	
Turnout		93,024	49.94	▼9.20
Total valid votes		90,441	97.22	
Rejected ballots		2,583	2.78	
Majority		1,974	2.18	▼14.16
Registered electors		186,287		
PML(N) hold				

== General elections 2018 ==
Provincial elections were held on 25 July 2018. Mian Abdul Rauf won the election with 34,478 votes.

Provincial election 2018: PP-138 Sheikhupura-IV
Party	Candidate	Votes	%	±%
PML(N)	Mian Abdul Rauf	34,478	42.12	▼10.27
PTI	Muhammad Ashfaq	21,104	25.78	▲10.89
TLP	Rafaqat Ali	12,247	14.96	
Independent	Sami Ullah	9,949	12.15	
Independent	Zaheer Afzal	1,450	1.77	
Others	Others (sixteen candidates)	2,624	3.21	
Turnout		84,427	59.14	▲4.59
Total valid votes		81,852	96.95	
Rejected ballots		2,575	3.05	
Majority		13,374	16.34	▼15.11
Registered electors		142,750		
PML(N) hold				

== General elections 2013 ==
Provincial elections were held on 11 May 2013. Pir Muhammad Ashraf Rasool won the election with 45,425 votes.

Provincial election 2013: PP-164 Sheikhupura-III
Party	Candidate	Votes	%	±%
PML(N)	Pir Muhammad Ashraf Rasool	45,425	52.39	
PML(Q)	Ali Abbas	18,153	20.93	
PTI	Muhammad Ishfaq Chaudhry	12,913	14.89	
JI	Amjad Ali Sajid	5,710	6.59	
Independent	Muhammad Ayyub Jatt	1,428	1.65	
Independent	Chaudhry Muhammad Boota	1,237	1.43	
Others	Others (seventeen candidates)	7,556	8.71	
Turnout		88,868	54.55	
Total valid votes		86,712	97.57	
Rejected ballots		2,156	2.43	
Majority		27,272	31.45	
Registered electors		162,919		
PML(N) hold				

== General elections 2008 ==
Contesting candidates	Party affiliation	Votes polled

== See also ==
- PP-138 Sheikhupura-III
- PP-140 Sheikhupura-V
