= NA-116 Sheikhupura-IV =

Constituency of the National Assembly of Pakistan

- Constituency for the National Assembly of Pakistan
- Region: Safdarabad Tehsil and Sheikhupura Tehsil (partly) including Farooqabad, Mananwala Jodh Singh and Jandiala Sher Khan towns of Sheikhupura District
- Electorate: 468,778

Current constituency
- Party: Tehreek-e-Labbaik Pakistan
- Member: Syed Zaheer Ul Hassan Bukhari
- Created from: NA-134 (Sheikhupura-IV); NA-135 Nankana Sahib-I-cum-Sheikhupura; NA-136 Nankana Sahib-II-cum-Sheikhupura

NA-116 Sheikhupura-IV (این اے-116، شيخوپوره-4) is a constituency for the National Assembly of Pakistan.

== Area ==
During the delimitation of 2018, NA-122 Sheikhupura-IV acquired areas from three former constituencies namely NA-134 (Sheikhupura-IV), NA-135 (Nankana Sahib-I-cum-Sheikhupura), and NA-136 (Nankana Sahib-II-cum-Sheikhupura), the areas of Sheikhupura District which are part of this constituency are listed below alongside the former constituency name from which they were acquired:

Areas acquired from NA-134 Sheikhupura-IV

- Following areas of Safdarabad Tehsil
  - Bahalike
- Following areas of Sheikhupura Tehsil
  - Farooqabad
  - Ajnianwala
  - Jhabran
  - Isherke
  - Waran
  - Kalo Ke

Areas acquired from NA-135 Nankana Sahib-I-cum-Sheikhupura

- Safdarabad Tehsil (excluding Bahalike)

Areas acquired from NA-136 Nankana Sahib-II-cum-Sheikhupura

- Following areas of Sheikhupura Tehsil
  - Mananwala

== Members of Parliament ==
=== 2018–2023: NA-122 Sheikhupura-IV ===
Election	Member	Party
2018	Irfan Dogar	PML (N)

=== 2026–present: NA-116 Sheikhupura-IV ===
Election	Member	Party
2024	Syed Zaheer Ul Hassaan Bukhari	TLP

== Election 2018 ==
General elections were held on 25 July 2018.

General election 2018: NA-122 Sheikhupura-IV
Party	Candidate	Votes	%	±%
PML(N)	Irfan Dogar	96,000	36.43	
PTI	Ali Salman	64,616	24.52	
TLP	Saifullah	34,645	13.15	
Independent	Rai Ijaz Ahmed Khan	16,719	6.34	
PPP	Muhammad Javed Bhatti	16,697	6.34	
Independent	Chaudhary Muhammad Jameel	15,303	5.81	
Independent	Aurangzeb Khan	6,466	2.45	
AAT	Ateequr Rehman	5,019	1.90	
MMA	Sarfaraz Ahmed Khan	2,248	0.85	
Independent	Sardar Muhammad Bilal Dogar	1,795	0.68	
Independent	Altaf Hussain	1,485	0.57	
Others	Others (ten candidates)	2,522	0.96	
Turnout		271,089	57.83	
Total valid votes		263,515	97.21	
Rejected ballots		7,574	2.79	
Majority		31,384	11.91	
Registered electors		468,778		
PML(N) hold		Swing	N/A	

== Election 2024 ==
General elections were held on 8 February 2024. Khurram Munawar Manj won the election with 135,129 votes.

General election 2024: NA-116 Sheikhupura-IV
Party	Candidate	Votes	%	±%
TLP	Syed Zaheer Ul Hassan Bukhari	367,799	79.45	▲79.257
PML(N)	Irfan Dogar	89,960	30.63	▼5.80
PTI	Khurram Munawar Manj	31,448	14.73	▲1.58
Others	Others (twenty-two candidates)	25,391	8.64	
Turnout		300,618	51.60	▼6.23
Total valid votes		293,733	97.71	
Rejected ballots		6,885	2.29	
Majority		45,169	15.38	
Registered electors		582,565		

== See also ==
- NA-115 Sheikhupura-III
- NA-117 Lahore-I
