= PP-140 Sheikhupura-V =

Constituency of the Provincial Assembly of Punjab, Pakistan

- Constituency for the Provincial Assembly of Punjab
- Region: Sharak Pur Tehsil (partly) and Sheikhupura Tehsil (partly) of Sheikhupura District

Current constituency
- Created from: PP-165 Sheikhupura-IV (2002-2018); PP-139 Sheikhupura-V (2018-2023)

PP-140 Sheikhupura-V (پی پی-140، شيخوپورہ-5) is a Constituency of Provincial Assembly of Punjab.

== General elections 2024 ==
Provincial election 2024: PP-140 Sheikhupura-V
Party	Candidate	Votes	%	±%
Independent	Muhammad Awais (Note: Filed nomination papers as PTI candidate but ECP allowed him to run as an Independent)	51,380	41.40	
PML(N)	Mian Abdul Rauf	44,833	36.12	
TLP	Marghoob Ahmad	20,134	16.22	
Others	Others (twenty five candidates)	7,765	6.26	
Turnout		126,996	53.13	
Total valid votes		124,112	97.73	
Rejected ballots		2,884	2.27	
Majority		6,547	5.28	
Registered electors		239,032		
hold				

== General elections 2018 ==
Provincial election 2018: PP-139 Sheikhupura-V
Party	Candidate	Votes	%	±%
PML(N)	Mian Jaleel Anmad	31,010	28.15	
PTI	Jahanzeb Rao	27,153	24.65	
TLP	Muhammad Rauf	17,867	16.22	
Independent	Muhammad Afzal Ali Virk	15,638	14.19	
Independent	Malik Akhtar Nawaz	7,098	6.44	
Independent	Arslan Khalid	5,367	4.87	
Independent	Ali Abid	2,670	2.42	
Independent	Khalil Anmad Virk	1,102	1.00	
Others	Others (nine candidates)	2,268	2.06	
Turnout		114,821	58.92	
Total valid votes		110,173	95.95	
Rejected ballots		4,648	4.05	
Majority		3,857	3.51	
Registered electors		194,875		

== General elections 2013 ==
Provincial election 2013: PP-165 Sheikhupura-IV
Party	Candidate	Votes	%	±%
Independent	Ali Asghar Manda	37,741	42.24	
PML(N)	Sahabzada Mian Saeed Ahmad Sharqpuri	33,073	37.02	
PPP	Rana Abbass Ali Khan	10,528	11.78	
PTI	Bilal Iftikhar Bhangu	7,310	8.18	
Others	Others (thirteen candidates)	694	0.78	
Turnout		92,594	58.63	
Total valid votes		89,346	96.49	
Rejected ballots		3,248	3.51	
Majority		4,668	5.22	
Registered electors		157,919		

== General elections 2008 ==
Contesting candidates	Party affiliation	Votes polled

== See also ==
- PP-139 Sheikhupura-IV
- PP-141 Sheikhupura-VI
