= Khurram Munawar Manj =

Member of the National Assembly of Pakistan from Sheikhupura (2024–2029)

- خُرم منور منج

Member of the National Assembly of Pakistan
- In office 29 February 2024 – 10 May 2026
- Constituency: NA-116 Sheikhupura-IV

Personal details
- Party: PTI (2023-present)
- Other political affiliations: PPP (2002); PPP (2002-2007); PML(Q) (2008-2018); IND (2018)

Khurram Munawar Manj (Urdu: خُرم منور منج) is a Pakistani politician who has been a member of the National Assembly of Pakistan since February 2024.

== Political career ==
Manj was elected to the National Assembly of Pakistan in the 2002 Pakistani general election as a candidate of Pakistan People's Party (PPP) from NA-134 Sheikhupura-IV. He received 44,073 votes and defeated Irfan Dogar, a candidate of Pakistan Muslim League (N) (PML(N)).

He later joined the Pakistan People's Party Parliamentarian-Patriots group.

He contested the 2008 Pakistani general election as a candidate of Pakistan Muslim League (Q) (PML(Q)) from NA-134 Sheikhupura-IV, but was unsuccessful. He received 32,928 votes and was defeated by Irfan Dogar, a candidate of PML(N).

He contested the 2013 Pakistani general election as a candidate of PML(Q) from NA-134 Sheikhupura-IV, but was unsuccessful. He received 39,351 votes and was defeated by Irfan Dogar, a candidate of PML(N).

He contested the 2018 Pakistani general election as an independent candidate from NA-121 Sheikhupura-III, but was unsuccessful. He received 29,301 votes and was defeated by Mian Javed Latif, a candidate of PML(N).

He was re-elected to the National Assembly in the 2024 Pakistani general election from NA-116 Sheikhupura-IV as an Independent candidate supported by Pakistan Tehreek-e-Insaf (PTI). He received 135,129 votes while runner-up Irfan Dogar, a candidate of PML(N), received 89,960 votes.
