= PP-144 Sheikhupura-IX =

Constituency of the Provincial Assembly of Punjab, Pakistan

- Constituency for the Provincial Assembly of Punjab
- Region: Safdarabad Tehsil and Sheikhupura Tehsil (partly) of Sheikhupura District

Current constituency
- Created from: PP-169 Sheikhupura-cum-Nankana-II (2002-2018); PP-143 Sheikhupura-IX (2018-2023)

PP-144 Sheikhupura-IX (پی پی-144، شيخوپورہ-9) is a Constituency of Provincial Assembly of Punjab.

== General elections 2024 ==
Provincial election 2024: PP-144 Sheikhupura-IX
Party	Candidate	Votes	%	±%
Independent	Muhammad Sarfaraz Dogar (Note: Filed nomination papers as PTI candidate but ECP allowed him to run as an Independent)	58,413	43.05	
PML(N)	Sajjad Haider Nadeem	34,239	25.23	
TLP	Zaka Ullah	13,173	9.71	
Independent	Inaam UI Haq	8,630	6.36	
PPP	Imran Sabir	7,903	5.82	
JI	Muhammad Irshad	4,508	3.32	
PAT	Muhammad Ishaq	2,022	1.49	
Others	Others (thirty three candidates)	6,804	5.02	
Turnout		138,911	51.71	
Total valid votes		135,692	97.68	
Rejected ballots		3,219	2.32	
Majority		24,174	17.82	
Registered electors		268,629		
hold				

== General elections 2018 ==
Provincial election 2018: PP-143 Sheikhupura-IX
Party	Candidate	Votes	%	±%
PML(N)	Sajjad Haider Nadeem	31,247	23.07	
Independent	Muhammad Sarfraz	31,082	22.95	
PTI	Rana Waheed Ahmad	30,178	22.29	
TLP	Muhammad Zaman Khan	13,130	9.70	
Independent	Sajad Baqar	8,672	6.40	
PPP	Inam Ul Haq	5,112	3.78	
Independent	Muhammad Saleem	4,465	3.30	
Independent	Rai Azeem Saeed Khan	2,994	2.21	
MMA	Sarfraz Anmad Khan	2,374	1.75	
Independent	Ameer Ali	1,640	1.21	
AAT	Faiz Ur Rahman	1,603	1.18	
Others	Others (ten candidates)	2,925	2.16	
Turnout		140,940	57.17	
Total valid votes		135,421	96.08	
Rejected ballots		5,519	3.92	
Majority		165	0.12	
Registered electors		246,520		

== General elections 2013 ==
Provincial election 2013: PP-169 Sheikhupura-cum-Nankana-II
Party	Candidate	Votes	%	±%
PML(N)	Sajjad Haider Gujjar	26,000	32.44	
Independent	Rana Waheed Ahmad	14,411	17.98	
Independent	Chaudhry Muhammad Mazhar Ali	11,711	14.61	
PTI	Chaudhry Ahmad Moeen Sandhu	7,228	9.02	
Independent	Chaudhry Ashiq Hussain Bhatti	6,136	7.66	
Independent	Mian Abdul Hafeez Tail Walay	5,251	6.55	
PPP	Muhammad Javed Bhatti	4,981	6.21	
Independent	Malik Waris Ali	2,315	2.89	
Others	Others (eighteen candidates)	2,119	2.64	
Turnout		82,941	59.54	
Total valid votes		80,152	96.64	
Rejected ballots		2,789	3.36	
Majority		11,589	14.46	
Registered electors		139,298		

== General elections 2008 ==
Contesting candidates	Party affiliation	Votes polled

== See also ==
- PP-143 Sheikhupura-VIII
- PP-145 Lahore-I
