= PP-143 Sheikhupura-VIII =

Constituency of the Provincial Assembly of Punjab, Pakistan

- Constituency for the Provincial Assembly of Punjab
- Region: Sheikhupura Tehsil (partly) including Jandiala Sher Khan and Farooqabad towns of Sheikhupura District

Current constituency
- Created from: PP-166 Sheikhupura-V (2002-2018); PP-142 Sheikhupura-VIII (2018-2023)

PP-143 Sheikhupura-VIII (پی پی-143، شيخوپورہ-8) is a Constituency of Provincial Assembly of Punjab.

== General elections 2024 ==
Provincial election 2024: PP-143 Sheikhupura-VIII
Party	Candidate	Votes	%	±%
Independent	Khan Sher Akbar Khan (Note: Filed nomination papers as PTI candidate but ECP allowed him to run as an Independent)	52,424	39.21	
PML(N)	Ishtiaq Ahmad	43,154	32.28	
TLP	Muhammad Yousaf Manj	23,929	17.90	
Independent	Shahbaz Ahmed	3,894	2.91	
PPP	Tahir Saeed	3,887	2.91	
JI	Muhammad Arshad	2,152	1.61	
Others	Others (thirty six candidates)	4,267	3.18	
Turnout		137,146	51.40	
Total valid votes		133,707	97.49	
Rejected ballots		3,439	2.51	
Majority		9,270	6.93	
Registered electors		266,798		
hold				

== General elections 2018 ==
Provincial election 2018: PP-142 Sheikhupura-VIII
Party	Candidate	Votes	%	±%
PTI	Khan Sher Akbar Khan	27,185	25.01	
PML(N)	Ishtiaq Ahmad	22,272	20.49	
Independent	Rana Asad Ullah Khan	12,629	11.62	
TLP	Shabir Abbas	12,112	11.14	
Independent	Sardar Muhammad Wasif Dogar	10,192	9.38	
PPP	Mumtaz Mahmood Khan	8,734	8.04	
Independent	Zulqurnian Dogar	5,283	4.86	
Independent	Zaka Ullah	3,680	3.39	
Independent	Tariq Mahmood	1,578	1.45	
AAT	Ehsan Ullah Rafique	1,512	1.39	
Others	Others (twenty one candidates)	3,512	3.23	
Turnout		112,273	58.62	
Total valid votes		108,689	96.81	
Rejected ballots		3,584	3.19	
Majority		4,913	4.52	
Registered electors		191,537		

== General elections 2013 ==
Provincial election 2013: PP-166 Sheikhupura-V
Party	Candidate	Votes	%	±%
PML(N)	Faizan Khalid Virk	22,709	27.51	
Independent	Malik Ishtiaq Ahmad Dogar	12,510	15.15	
Independent	Mumtaz Mehmood Khan	10,577	12.81	
Independent	Rana Asad Ullah Khan	9,815	11.89	
PTI	Ch. Mairaj Khalid Gujjar	9,063	10.98	
PPP	Haji Falak Sher	6,285	7.61	
TTP	Mehboob Ishaq Kamboh	3,795	4.60	
Independent	Malik Nadir Ali Khokhar	3,728	4.52	
JI	Muhammaed Nawaz	1,082	1.31	
Others	Others (twenty seven candidates)	2,991	3.62	
Turnout		86,180	60.96	
Total valid votes		82,555	95.79	
Rejected ballots		3,625	4.21	
Majority		10,199	12.36	
Registered electors		141,368		

== General elections 2008 ==
Contesting candidates	Party affiliation	Votes polled

== See also ==
- PP-142 Sheikhupura-VII
- PP-144 Sheikhupura-IX
