= Mandi Faizabad =

Mandi Faizabad منڈی فیض آباد
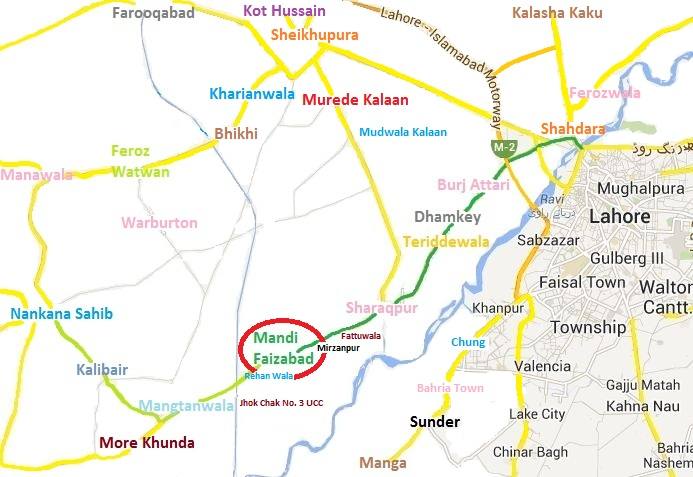

- Location within Pakistan
- Coordinates: 31°27′N 73°42′E
- Country: Pakistan
- Province: Punjab
- District: Nankana Sahib
- Union Council: Rehan Wala
- Language: Punjabi
- Elevation: 188 m (617 ft)
- Time zone: UTC+5 (PST)
- Postal code: 39470
- Dialling code: 0562

Mandi Faizabad (منڈی فیض آباد) is a small town of Nankana Sahib District in Pakistan. Mandi Faizabad old name was Dhoka Mandi and when Noor Muhammad Khuaja almaroof Haq Peer Mitha Sai De Darga NoorPur Shareef (Sindh) came here he proclaimed his new name to be Mandi Faizabad because here Disbursement of 'Faiz Haq Peers Mitha Sai began. A flourishing and lush green town famous for its vegetables, fruits, flowers, greenery, meadows and gardens. It is situated on Jaranwala road 45 km from Lahore and 33 km from first exit of Lahore-Islamabad Motorway (M2). The city of the famous saint Mian Sher Muhammad Sharaqpuri Sharaqpur Sharif is 13 km away from Mandi Faizabad towards Lahore. Mandi Faizabad is the economic hub of the area having a number of rice processing units and rice markets which provides fine quality rice to the whole of Pakistan as well as job opportunities to the people of the area.

== History ==
The District of Nankana Sahib was established in 2005. Before the establishment of Nanakana Sahib as a district, Mandi Faizabad was in Sheikhupura District. District Nankana Sahib comprised the following four Tehsils until 2008.

1. Nankana Sahib

2. Shah Kot

3. Sangla Hill

4. Safdarabad

Note: Tehsil Safdarabad was since made part of District Sheikhupura.
