= Mian Jaleel Ahmed =

Pakistani politician

Member of the Provincial Assembly of the Punjab
- In office 4 October 2018 – 16 July 2022
- Constituency: PP-139 (Sheikhupura-V)

Member of the National Assembly of Pakistan
- In office 2002–2007
- Succeeded by: Rana Tanveer Hussain
- Constituency: NA-132 (Sheikhupura-II)

Personal details
- Born: Mian Jaleel Ahmed Sharaqpuri; 6 March 1962 (age 64) Sharaqpur, Punjab, Pakistan
- Party: AP (2025-present)
- Other political affiliations: PTI (2015-); APML (2011-2012); IND (2008); PMLN (2002)

Mian Jaleel Ahmed Sharaqpuri (born 6 March 1962) is a Pakistani politician who was a member of the Provincial Assembly of the Punjab from October 2018 till his resignation in July 2022. Previously, he was a member of the National Assembly of Pakistan from 2002 to 2007.

== Early life and education ==
He was born on 6 March 1962 in Sharaqpur, Pakistan.

He graduated from the Islamia College in 1984. In 1988, he received a degree of Master of Arts in Economics from the University of the Punjab.

== Political career ==
He was elected to the National Assembly of Pakistan as a candidate of Pakistan Muslim League (N) (PML-N) from Constituency NA-132 (Sheikhupura-II) in the 2002 Pakistani general election. He received 51,159 votes and defeated Mian Muhammad Azhar.

He ran for the seat of the National Assembly as an independent candidate from Constituency NA-132 (Sheikhupura-II-cum-Nankana Sahib) in the 2008 Pakistani general election, but was unsuccessful. He received 444 votes and lost the seat to Rana Tanveer Hussain.

In December 2011, he announced to join All Pakistan Muslim League (APML).

In 2012, he joined Pakistan Tehreek-e-Insaf (PTI).

In September 2015, he announced to re-join PTI.

He was elected to the Provincial Assembly of the Punjab as a candidate of PML-N from Constituency PP-139 (Sheikhupura-V) in the 2018 Pakistani general election.

On 16 July 2022, he resigned in front of the Speaker of the Provincial Assembly of Punjab, Chaudhry Pervaiz Elahi.
