= NA-115 Sheikhupura-III =

Constituency of the National Assembly of Pakistan

- Constituency for the National Assembly of Pakistan
- Region: Sheikhupura Tehsil (partly) including Sheikhupura city of Sheikhupura District
- Electorate: 436,660

Current constituency
- Created: 2018
- Party: Pakistan Tehreek-e-Insaf
- Member: Khurram Shahzad Virk
- Created from: NA-133 (Sheikhupura-III); NA-134 (Sheikhupura-IV); NA-136 (Nankana Sahib-II-cum-Sheikhupura)

NA-115 Sheikhupura-III (این اے-115، شيخوپوره-۳) is a constituency of the National Assembly of Pakistan.

== Area ==
During the 2018 delimitation, NA-121 (Sheikhupura-III) acquired areas from three former constituencies namely NA-133 (Sheikhupura-III), NA-134 (Sheikhupura-IV), and NA-136 (Nankana Sahib-II-cum-Sheikhupura). The areas of Sheikhupura District that now form part of this constituency are listed below, along with the names of the former constituencies from which they were acquired:

Areas acquired from NA-133 Sheikhupura-III

- Municipal Corporation Sheikhupura
- Following areas of Sheikhupura Tehsil
  - Sheikhupura Qanungo Halqa (excluding Ghazi Minara, Jhamkey, Machike, and Ghang)
  - Sahuki Malian

Areas acquired from NA-134 Sheikhupura-IV

- Following areas of Sheikhupura Tehsil
  - Ghang
  - Ghazi Minara
  - Machike
  - Jandiala Sher Khan (excluding Jhabran, Isherke, Waran, and Kalo Ke)
  - Town Committee Jandiala Sher Khan

Areas acquired from NA-136 Nankana Sahib-II-cum-Sheikhupura

- Following areas of Sheikhupura Tehsil
  - Bhikhi (excluding Malowal, Bahuman, and Hoeke)
  - Jevanpur Kalan

== Members of Parliament ==
=== 2018–2023: NA-121 Sheikhupura-III ===
Election	Member	Party
2018	Mian Javed Latif	PML (N)

=== 2024–present: NA-115 Sheikhupura-III ===
Election	Member	Party
2023	Khurram Shahzad Virk	PTI

== Election 2018 ==
General elections were held on 25 July 2018.

General election 2018: NA-121 Sheikhupura-III
Party	Candidate	Votes	%	±%
PML(N)	Mian Javed Latif	101,622	42.30	
PTI	Muhammad Saeed Virk	71,308	29.68	
Independent	Khurram Munawar Manj	29,301	12.20	
TLP	Nadeem Zafar	20,930	8.71	
Others	Others (eleven candidates)	17,079	7.11	
Turnout		245,216	56.16	
Total valid votes		240,240	97.97	
Rejected ballots		4,976	2.03	
Majority		30,314	12.62	
Registered electors		436,660		
PML(N) hold		Swing	N/A	

== Election 2024 ==
General elections were held on 8 February 2024. Khurram Shahzad Virk won the election with 130,416 votes.

General election 2024: NA-115 Sheikhupura-III
Party	Candidate	Votes	%	±%
PTI	Khurram Shahzad Virk (Note: Filed nomination papers as PTI candidate but ECP allowed him to run as an Independent)	130,416	48.53	▲18.65
PML(N)	Mian Javed Latif	94,161	35.04	▼7.26
TLP	Nadeem Zafar	28,960	10.78	▲2.07
Others	Others (twenty-four candidates)	15,186	5.65	
Turnout		275,178	50.37	▼5.79
Total valid votes		268,723	97.65	
Rejected ballots		6,455	2.35	
Majority		36,255	13.49	
Registered electors		546,262		

== See also ==
- NA-114 Sheikhupura-II
- NA-116 Sheikhupura-IV
