= Rana Tahir Iqbal =

Pakistani politician

- رانا طاہر اقبال

Member of the Provincial Assembly of Punjab
- Incumbent
- Assumed office 13 January 2025
- Preceded by: Rana Afzaal Hussain
- Constituency: PP-139 Sheikhupura-IV

Personal details
- Born: Sheikhupura, Punjab, Pakistan
- Party: PMLN (2024-present)
- Relations: Rana Tanveer Hussain (father-in-law)
- Occupation: Politician

Rana Tahir Iqbal (Urdu: رانا طاہر اقبال) is a Pakistani politician from Sheikhupura who has been a member of the Provincial Assembly of Punjab since January 2025.

== Political career ==
He was elected to the Provincial Assembly of Punjab from PP-139 Sheikhupura-IV as a candidate of Pakistan Muslim League (N) (PML(N)) in a December 2024 by-election. He received 44,535 votes and defeated Ijaz Hussain Bhatti, a candidate of Independent politician Supported (PTI) Pakistan Tehreek-e-Insaf.
