= PP-142 Sheikhupura-VII =

Constituency of the Provincial Assembly of Punjab, Pakistan

- Constituency for the Provincial Assembly of Punjab
- Region: Sheikhupura Tehsil (partly) including Mananwala town of Sheikhupura District

Current constituency
- Created from: PP-168 Sheikhupura-cum-Nankana-I (2002-2018); PP-141 Sheikhupura-VII (2018-2023)

PP-142 Sheikhupura-VII (پی پی-142، شيخوپورہ-7) is a Constituency of Provincial Assembly of Punjab.

== General elections 2024 ==
Provincial election 2024: PP-142 Sheikhupura-VII
Party	Candidate	Votes	%	±%
Independent	Waqas Mahmood Maan (Note: Filed nomination papers as PTI candidate but ECP allowed him to run as an Independent)	49,537	39.47	
PML(N)	Mehmood UI Haq	43,100	34.34	
TLP	Ikram Saeed Bhatti	26,284	20.94	
Others	Others (nineteen candidates)	6,599	5.25	
Turnout		128,696	54.30	
Total valid votes		125,520	97.53	
Rejected ballots		3,176	2.47	
Majority		6,437	5.13	
Registered electors		237,018		
hold				

== General elections 2018 ==
Provincial election 2018: PP-141 Sheikhupura-VII
Party	Candidate	Votes	%	±%
PML(N)	Mahmood Ul Haq	37,443	33.01	
PTI	Abid Hussain Chattha	27,719	24.44	
Independent	Sabahat Bhatti	16,887	14.89	
TLP	Nosheen Akbar	10,049	8.86	
Independent	Tanveer Ahmad Nasir	4,520	3.99	
PPP	Tahir Saeed	4,061	3.58	
MMA	Ghulam Rasool	3,522	3.11	
AAT	Ashiq Ali Ch.	2,798	2.47	
Independent	Muhammad Wakeel	2,520	2.22	
Independent	Irfan Ali	1,725	1.52	
Others	Others (eight candidates)	2,176	1.94	
Turnout		117,031	59.61	
Total valid votes		113,420	96.92	
Rejected ballots		3,611	3.08	
Majority		9,724	8.57	
Registered electors		196,319		

== General elections 2013 ==
Provincial election 2013: PP-168 Sheikhupura-cum-Nankana-I
Party	Candidate	Votes	%	±%
Independent	Ali Salman	24,813	27.73	
PML(N)	Rana Tanvir Ahmad Nasir	22,001	24.59	
Independent	Chaudhry Fazal Mahmood Gujjar	13,627	15.23	
Independent	Alhaj Muhammad Ishaq Bhatti	7,369	8.24	
PTI	Imran Saeed	6,589	7.36	
Independent	Malik Abdul Sattar Watoo	6,118	6.84	
Independent	Nayab Roshan Bhango	2,245	2.51	
Independent	Chaudhry Tahir Mahmood Arain	2,160	2.41	
Independent	Ahmad Saeed Bhatti	2,083	2.33	
JI	Chaudhry Ghulam Rasool BhattiI	1,384	1.55	
Others	Others (nineteen candidates)	1,082	1.21	
Turnout		92,960	60.13	
Total valid votes		89,471	96.25	
Rejected ballots		3,489	3.75	
Majority		2,812	3.14	
Registered electors		154,586		

== General elections 2008 ==
Contesting candidates	Party affiliation	Votes polled

== See also ==
- PP-141 Sheikhupura-VI
- PP-143 Sheikhupura-VIII
