= List of towns and cities with 100,000 or more inhabitants/country: P-Q-R-S =

This is a list of towns and cities in the world believed to have 100,000 or more inhabitants, sorted by countries beginning with letters between P and S. Unless otherwise noted, populations are based on United Nations estimates from 2022.

Index

A-B • C-D-E-F • G-H-I-J-K • L-M-N-O • P-Q-R-S • T-U-V-W-Y-Z
Back to main page

== Pakistan ==
- Federal capital
- Provincial capital
- Divisional capital

City	Pop. (2023 census)	Province	Picture
Karachi	18,868,021	Sindh	Karachi
Lahore	13,004,135	Punjab	Lahore
Faisalabad	3,691,999	Punjab	Faisalabad
Rawalpindi	3,357,612	Punjab	Rawalpindi
Gujranwala	2,511,118	Punjab	Gujranwala
Multan	2,215,381	Punjab	Multan
Hyderabad	1,921,275	Sindh	Hyderabad
Peshawar	1,905,975	Khyber Pakhtunkhwa	Peshawar
Quetta	1,565,546	Balochistan	Quetta
Islamabad	1,108,872	Islamabad Capital Territory	Islamabad
Sargodha	975,886	Punjab	Sargodha
Sialkot	911,817	Punjab	Sialkot
Bahawalpur	903,795	Punjab	Bahawalpur
Jhang	606,533	Punjab	Jhang
Sheikhupura	591,424	Punjab	Sheikhupura
Gujrat	574,240	Punjab	Gujrat
Sukkur	563,851	Sindh	Sukkar
Larkana	551,716	Sindh	Larkana
Sahiwal	538,344	Punjab	Sahiwal
Okara	533,693	Punjab	Okara
Rahim Yar Khan	519,261	Punjab	Rahim Yar Khan
Kasur	510,875	Punjab	
Dera Ghazi Khan	494,464	Punjab	Dera Ghazi Khan
Wah Cantonment	400,733	Punjab	
Mardan	368,302	Khyber Pakhtunkhwa	
Nawabshah (Benazirabad)	363,138	Sindh	
Burewala	361,664	Punjab	
Mingora	361,112	Khyber Pakhtunkhwa	
Hafizabad	318,621	Punjab	
Chiniot	318,165	Punjab	
Jhelum	312,426	Punjab	
Kāmoke	292,023	Punjab	
Khanewal	281,890	Punjab	
Sadiqabad	274,210	Punjab	
Turbat	268,625	Balochistan	Turbat
Mirpur Khas	267,833	Sindh	
Muridke	254,291	Punjab	
Gilgit	250,000 (2025)	Gilgit-Baltistan	
Khanpur	247,170	Punjab	
Bahawalnagar	241,873	Punjab	
Kohat	235,880	Khyber Pakhtunkhwa	
Muzaffargarh	235,541	Punjab	
Abbottabad	234,395	Khyber Pakhtunkhwa	
Mandi Bahauddin	232,361	Punjab	
Daska	228,626	Punjab	
Pakpattan	221,280	Punjab	
Dera Ismail Khan	220,575	Khyber Pakhtunkhwa	
Jacobabad	219,315	Sindh	
Chakwal	218,356	Punjab	
Khuzdar	218,112	Balochistan	
Gojra	214,349	Punjab	
Vehari	210,288	Punjab	
Shikarpur	204,938	Sindh	
Ahmedpur East	196,618	Punjab	
Hub	195,661	Balochistan	
Chishtian	192,403	Punjab	
Khairpur	191,044	Sindh	
Dadu	188,317	Sindh	
Samundri	186,371	Punjab	
Ferozwala	177,238	Punjab	
Attock	176,544	Punjab	
Tando Adam	174,291	Sindh	
Tando Allahyar	171,185	Sindh	
Jaranwala	170,872	Punjab	
Bholari	169,613	Sindh	
Muzaffarabad	149913 (2017 Census)	Azad Kashmir	
Hasilpur	168,146	Punjab	
Kamalia	166,617	Punjab	
Kot Abdul Malik	162,030	Punjab	
Panjgur	157,693	Balochistan	Panjgur
Arif Wala	157,063	Punjab	
Gujranwala Cantonment	156,929	Punjab	
Swabi	156,496	Khyber Pakhtunkhwa	
Jampur	155,243	Punjab	
Jatoi	155,196	Punjab	
Wazirabad	152,624	Punjab	
Layyah	151,274	Punjab	
Shujabad	151,115	Punjab	
Haroonabad	149,679	Punjab	
Jalalpur Jattan	146,743	Punjab	
Umerkot	144,558	Sindh	
Lodhran	144,512	Punjab	
Moro	142,685	Sindh	
Kot Addu	142,161	Punjab	
Mian Channu	140,112	Punjab	
Khushab	139,905	Punjab	
Rajanpur	137,553	Punjab	
Mansehra	137,278	Khyber Pakhtunkhwa	
Taxila	136,900	Punjab	
Mirpur	124352 (2017 Census)	Azad Kashmir	
Kabal	132,549	Khyber Pakhtunkhwa	
Bhakkar	131,658	Punjab	
Narowal	130,692	Punjab	
Chaman	130,139	Balochistan	
Mianwali	129,500	Punjab	
Shakargarh	126,742	Punjab	
Mailsi	125,431	Punjab	
Nowshera	122,953	Khyber Pakhtunkhwa	
Dipalpur	122,759	Punjab	
Haveli Lakha	122,389	Punjab	
Lala Musa	121,036	Punjab	
Shahdadkot	120,687	Sindh	
Charsadda	120,170	Khyber Pakhtunkhwa	
Ghotki	119,879	Sindh	
Sambrial	119,571	Punjab	
Bhalwal	117,982	Punjab	
Badin	117,455	Sindh	
Taunsa	115,704	Punjab	
Barikot	115,045	Khyber Pakhtunkhwa	
Phool Nagar	114,530	Punjab	
Tando Muhammad Khan	114,406	Sindh	
Pattoki	113,735	Punjab	
Shahdadpur	113,342	Sindh	
Jauharabad	113,188	Punjab	
Skardu	112,996 (2021)	Gilgit-Baltistan	
Kamber Ali Khan	112,313	Sindh	
Chichawatni	112,191	Punjab	
Farooqabad	109,717	Punjab	
Pishin	107,646	Balochistan	
Dera Murad Jamali	106,952	Balochistan	
Kotri	106,615	Sindh	
Sangla Hill	103,709	Punjab	
Gujar Khan	103,284	Punjab	
Kharian	103,036	Punjab	
Pasrur	102,717	Punjab	
Pano Akil	102,701	Sindh	
Shabqadar	102,340	Khyber Pakhtunkhwa	
Kot Radha Kishan	102,057	Punjab	
Ludhewala Waraich	100,331	Punjab	
Renala Khurd	100,054	Punjab	
Chilas	100,000 (2026)	Gilgit-Baltistan	

== Palestine ==
City	Governorate	Population (2017)
Jerusalem	Jerusalem	375,640
Gaza	Gaza	590,481
Khan Yunis	Khan Yunis	205,125
Hebron	Hebron	201,063
Jabalia	North Gaza	172,704
Rafah	Rafah	171,899
Nablus	Nablus	156,906

== Panama ==
City	Province	Population (2023)
Panamá	Panamá	1,049,222
San Miguelito	Panamá	280,777
La Chorrera	Panamá Oeste	205,959
Colón	Colón	159,157
Vista Alegre	Panamá Oeste	128,973
David	Chiriquí	103,915

== Papua New Guinea ==
City	Province	Population (2011)
Port Moresby	National Capital District	364,125
Lae	Morobe	148,934

== Paraguay ==
City	Department	Population (2022)
Asunción	Capital	462,241
Ciudad del Este	Alto Paraná	325,819
Luque	Central	259,705
Capiatá	Central	236,999
San Lorenzo	Central	225,395
Limpio	Central	139,652
Lambaré	Central	127,150
Ñemby	Central	116,383
Pedro Juan Caballero	Amambay	114,944
Fernando de la Mora	Central	110,255

== Peru ==
City	Department	Population (2017)
Lima	Lima Province	10,039,500
Arequipa	Arequipa	877,500
Trujillo	La Libertad	810,800
Chiclayo	Lambayeque	606,100
Piura	Piura	445,400
Iquitos	Loreto	442,100
Cuzco	Cusco	434,200
Chimbote	Ancash	374,100
Huancayo	Junín	368,400
Tacna	Tacna	297,500
Juliaca	Puno	280,800
Ica	Ica	246,800
Cajamarca	Cajamarca	233,400
Pucallpa	Ucayali	211,700
Sullana	Piura	203,000
Ayacucho	Ayacucho	184,100
Chincha Alta	Ica	179,800
Huánuco	Huánuco	177,200
Tarapoto	San Martín	147,300
Puno	Puno	143,000
Huaraz	Ancash	130,200
Tumbes	Tumbes	112,800
Pisco	Ica	104,900

== Philippines ==
City	Region	Population (2020)
Angeles City	Central Luzon	462,900
Angono	Calabarzon	130,500
Antipolo	Calabarzon	887,400
Apalit	Central Luzon	117,200
Arayat	Central Luzon	144,900
Bacolod	Western Visayas	600,800
Bacoor	Calabarzon	664,600
Bago	Western Visayas	191,200
Baguio	Cordillera	366,400
Balanga	Central Luzon	104,200
Baliwag	Central Luzon	168,500
Batangas City	Calabarzon	351,400
Bayambang	Ilocos	129,000
Bayawan	Central Visayas	122,700
Baybay	Eastern Visayas	111,800
Bayugan	Caraga	109,500
Binangonan	Calabarzon	313,600
Biñan	Calabarzon	407,400
Bocaue	Central Luzon	141,400
Bongao	Bangsamoro	116,100
Bulan	Bicol	105,300
Butuan	Caraga	372,900
Cabanatuan	Central Luzon	327,300
Cabuyao	Calabarzon	355,300
Cadiz	Western Visayas	158,500
Cagayan de Oro	Northern Mindanao	728,400
Cainta	Calabarzon	376,900
Calamba	Calabarzon	539,700
Calapan	Mimaropa	145,800
Calasiao	Ilocos	100,500
Calbayog	Eastern Visayas	187,000
Caloocan	Metro Manila	1,661,600
Calumpit	Central Luzon	118,500
Candaba	Central Luzon	119,500
Candelaria	Calabarzon	137,900
Capas	Central Luzon	156,100
Carcar	Central Visayas	136,500
Carmen	Soccsksargen	107,600
Carmona	Calabarzon	106,300
Catbalogan	Eastern Visayas	106,400
Cauayan	Cagayan Valley	143,400
Cauayan	Western Visayas	108,500
Cavite City	Calabarzon	100,700
Cebu City	Central Visayas	964,200
Concepcion	Central Luzon	170,000
Consolacion	Central Visayas	148,000
Cotabato City	Bangsamoro	325,100
Daet	Bicol	111,700
Dagupan	Ilocos	174,300
Danao	Central Visayas	156,300
Daraga	Bicol	133,900
Dasmariñas	Calabarzon	703,100
Datu Odin Sinsuat	Bangsamoro	116,800
Davao City	Davao	1,776,900
Digos	Davao	246,800
Dinalupihan	Central Luzon	118,200
Dipolog	Zamboanga Peninsula	138,100
Dumaguete	Central Visayas	134,100
Floridablanca	Central Luzon	135,500
Gapan	Central Luzon	123,000
General Mariano Alvarez	Calabarzon	172,400
General Santos	Soccsksargen	697,300
General Trias	Calabarzon	450,800
Gingoog	Northern Mindanao	136,700
Glan	Soccsksargen	109,500
Guagua	Central Luzon	128,900
Guiguinto	Central Luzon	113,400
Guihulngan	Central Visayas	102,700
Guimba	Central Luzon	127,700
Hagonoy	Central Luzon	133,400
Himamaylan	Western Visayas	116,200
Ilagan	Cagayan Valley	158,200
Iligan	Northern Mindanao	363,100
Iloilo City	Western Visayas	457,600
Imus	Calabarzon	496,800
Iriga	Bicol	114,500
Isabela City	Zamboanga Peninsula	130,400
Jolo	Bangsamoro	173,300
Kabankalan	Western Visayas	200,200
Kawit	Calabarzon	107,500
Kidapawan	Soccsksargen	160,800
Koronadal	Soccsksargen	195,400
La Trinidad	Cordillera	137,400
Labo	Bicol	109,200
Lamitan	Bangsamoro	100,200
Laoag	Ilocos	111,700
Lapu-Lapu	Central Visayas	497,600
Las Piñas	Metro Manila	606,300
Legazpi	Bicol	209,500
Libmanan	Bicol	113,000
Ligao	Bicol	118,100
Liloan	Central Visayas	153,200
Lingayen	Ilocos	107,700
Lipa	Calabarzon	372,900
Los Baños	Calabarzon	115,400
Lubao	Central Luzon	173,500
Lucena	Calabarzon	278,900
Mabalacat	Central Luzon	293,200
Magalang	Central Luzon	124,200
Makati	Metro Manila	629,600
Malabon	Metro Manila	380,500
Malasiqui	Ilocos	143,100
Malaybalay	Northern Mindanao	190,700
Malita	Davao	118,200
Malolos	Central Luzon	261,200
Malungon	Soccsksargen	105,500
Mandaluyong	Metro Manila	425,800
Mandaue	Central Visayas	364,100
Mangaldan	Ilocos	113,200
Manila	Metro Manila	1,846,500
Manolo Fortich	Northern Mindanao	113,200
Maramag	Northern Mindanao	108,300
Marawi	Bangsamoro	207,000
Marikina	Metro Manila	456,100
Marilao	Central Luzon	254,500
Mariveles	Central Luzon	149,900
Masbate City	Bicol	104,500
Mati	Davao	147,500
Mexico	Central Luzon	173,400
Meycauayan	Central Luzon	225,700
Midsayap	Soccsksargen	165,400
Minglanilla	Central Visayas	151,000
Muntinlupa	Metro Manila	543,400
Naga	Bicol	209,200
Naga	Central Visayas	133,200
Naic	Calabarzon	161,000
Nasugbu	Calabarzon	136,500
Naujan	Mimaropa	109,600
Navotas	Metro Manila	247,500
Norzagaray	Central Luzon	136,100
Olongapo	Central Luzon	260,300
Ormoc	Eastern Visayas	231,000
Ozamiz	Northern Mindanao	140,300
Quezon	Northern Mindanao	109,600
Pagadian	Zamboanga Peninsula	210,500
Panabo	Davao	209,200
Pandi	Central Luzon	155,200
Paniqui	Central Luzon	103,000
Parang	Bangsamoro	102,900
Parañaque	Metro Manila	690,000
Pasay	Metro Manila	440,700
Pasig	Metro Manila	803,200
Pikit	Soccsksargen	164,700
Plaridel	Central Luzon	114,400
Polomolok	Soccsksargen	172,600
Porac	Central Luzon	140,800
Puerto Princesa	Mimaropa	307,100
Pulilan	Central Luzon	108,800
Quezon City	Metro Manila	2,960,000
Rodriguez	Calabarzon	444,000
Rosario, Batangas	Calabarzon	128,400
Rosario, Cavite	Calabarzon	110,800
Roxas	Western Visayas	179,300
Sagay	Western Visayas	148,900
Samal	Davao	116,800
San Carlos	Ilocos	205,400
San Carlos	Western Visayas	132,700
San Fernando	Central Luzon	354,700
San Fernando	Ilocos	125,600
San Ildefonso	Central Luzon	115,700
San Jose	Central Luzon	150,900
San Jose	Mimaropa	153,300
San Jose del Monte	Central Luzon	651,800
San Juan	Calabarzon	114,100
San Juan	Metro Manila	126,300
San Mateo	Calabarzon	273,300
San Miguel	Central Luzon	172,100
San Pablo	Calabarzon	285,300
San Pedro	Calabarzon	326,000
San Rafael	Central Luzon	103,100
Santa Cruz	Calabarzon	123,600
Santa Cruz	Davao	101,100
Santa Maria	Central Luzon	289,800
Santa Rosa	Calabarzon	414,800
Santiago	Cagayan Valley	148,600
Santo Tomas	Calabarzon	218,500
Santo Tomas	Davao	128,700
Sariaya	Calabarzon	161,900
Silang	Calabarzon	295,600
Silay	Western Visayas	130,500
Sindangan	Zamboanga Peninsula	104,000
Sorsogon City	Bicol	182,200
Subic	Central Luzon	111,900
Sultan Kudarat	Bangsamoro	105,100
Surigao City	Caraga	171,100
T'boli	Soccsksargen	101,000
Tabaco	Bicol	141,000
Tabuk	Cordillera	121,000
Tacloban	Eastern Visayas	251,900
Tacurong	Soccsksargen	109,300
Tagbilaran	Central Visayas	105,000
Taguig	Metro Manila	886,700
Tagum	Davao	296,200
Talavera	Central Luzon	132,300
Talipao	Bangsamoro	100,100
Talisay	Central Visayas	263,000
Talisay	Western Visayas	108,900
Tanauan	Calabarzon	193,900
Tanay	Calabarzon	139,400
Tanza	Calabarzon	312,100
Tarlac City	Central Luzon	385,400
Tayabas	Calabarzon	112,700
Taytay	Calabarzon	386,500
Tiaong	Calabarzon	106,300
Toledo	Central Visayas	207,300
Trece Martires	Calabarzon	210,500
Tuguegarao	Cagayan Valley	166,300
Urdaneta	Ilocos	144,600
Valencia	Northern Mindanao	216,500
Valenzuela	Metro Manila	715,000
Zamboanga City	Zamboanga Peninsula	977,200

== Poland ==
City	Region	Population (2023)
Białystok	Podlaskie	292,058
Bielsko-Biała	Silesian	166,189
Bydgoszcz	Kuyavian-Pomeranian	328,370
Bytom	Silesian	148,687
Chorzów	Silesian	101,184
Częstochowa	Silesian	207,117
Dąbrowa Górnicza	Silesian	114,148
Elbląg	Warmian-Masurian	113,195
Gdańsk	Pomeranian	486,492
Gdynia	Pomeranian	242,141
Gliwice	Silesian	170,457
Gorzów Wielkopolski	Lubusz	115,847
Katowice	Silesian	279,119
Kielce	Świętokrzyskie	183,147
Koszalin	West Pomeranian	105,905
Kraków	Lesser Poland	804,237
Łódź	Łódź	655,279
Lublin	Lublin	330,447
Olsztyn	Warmian-Masurian	167,844
Opole	Opole	126,300
Płock	Masovian	111,927
Poznań	Greater Poland	540,146
Radom	Masovian	196,918
Ruda Śląska	Silesian	131,062
Rybnik	Silesian	131,323
Rzeszów	Podkarpackie	197,536
Sosnowiec	Silesian	188,151
Szczecin	West Pomeranian	390,278
Tarnów	Lesser Poland	103,515
Toruń	Kuyavian-Pomeranian	195,263
Tychy	Silesian	122,605
Wałbrzych	Lower Silesian	101,082
Warsaw	Masovian	1,861,644
Włocławek	Kuyavian-Pomeranian	101,450
Wrocław	Lower Silesian	674,132
Zabrze	Silesian	154,642
Zielona Góra	Lubusz	139,132

== Portugal ==
City	Region	Population (2022)
Amadora	Lisbon	174,511
Braga	North	197,594
Cascais	Lisbon	213,928
Coimbra	Central	142,252
Funchal	Madeira	106,429
Lisbon	Lisbon	548,703
Loures	Lisbon	203,724
Porto	North	240,592
Sintra	Lisbon	388,767
Vila Nova de Gaia	North	307,563

== Puerto Rico ==
City	Population (2015)
Bayamón	189,200
Caguas	134,500
Carolina	161,900
Ponce	149,000
San Juan	355,100

== Qatar ==
City	Municipality	Population (2020)
Doha	Doha	1,186,023
Al Rayyan	Al Rayyan	799,933

== Réunion ==
City	Arrondissement	Population (2021)
Saint-Denis	Arrondissement de Saint-Denis	154,765
Saint-Paul	Arrondissement de Saint-Paul	105,240

== Romania ==
City	County	Population (2021)
Arad	Arad	145,078
Bacău	Bacău	136,087
Baia Mare	Maramureș	108,759
Brăila	Brăila	154,686
Brașov	Brașov	237,589
Bucharest	Bucharest	1,716,961
Buzău	Buzău	103,481
Cluj-Napoca	Cluj	286,598
Constanța	Constanța	263,688
Craiova	Dolj	234,140
Galați	Galați	217,851
Iași	Iași	271,692
Oradea	Bihor	183,105
Pitești	Argeș	141,275
Ploiești	Prahova	180,540
Sibiu	Sibiu	134,309
Târgu Mureș	Mureș	116,033
Timișoara	Timiș	250,849

== Russia ==
City	Federal subject	Population (2023)
Abakan	Khakassia	185,348
Almetyevsk	Tatarstan	164,145
Angarsk	Irkutsk Oblast	218,386
Arkhangelsk	Arkhangelsk Oblast	298,617
Armavir	Krasnodar Krai	184,219
Artyom	Primorsky Krai	108,690
Arzamas	Nizhny Novgorod Oblast	103,997
Astrakhan	Astrakhan Oblast	468,842
Balakovo	Saratov Oblast	182,758
Balashikha	Moscow Oblast	526,851
Barnaul	Altai Krai	623,057
Bataysk	Rostov Oblast	125,523
Belgorod	Belgorod Oblast	333,931
Berdsk	Novosibirsk Oblast	102,965
Berezniki	Perm Krai	135,533
Biysk	Altai Krai	181,678
Blagoveshchensk	Amur Oblast	240,572
Bratsk	Irkutsk Oblast	221,244
Bryansk	Bryansk Oblast	375,669
Cheboksary	Chuvashia	496,238
Chelyabinsk	Chelyabinsk Oblast	1,182,517
Cherepovets	Vologda Oblast	301,040
Cherkessk	Karachay-Cherkessia	112,789
Chita	Zabaykalsky Krai	333,679
Derbent	Dagestan	126,078
Dimitrovgrad	Ulyanovsk Oblast	109,547
Dolgoprudny	Moscow Oblast	119,957
Domodedovo	Moscow Oblast	155,421
Dzerzhinsk	Nizhny Novgorod Oblast	216,598
Elektrostal	Moscow Oblast	143,182
Elista	Kalmykia	102,428
Engels	Saratov Oblast	223,333
Grozny	Chechnya	331,402
Irkutsk	Irkutsk Oblast	611,215
Ivanovo	Ivanovo Oblast	360,687
Izhevsk	Udmurtia	620,591
Kaliningrad	Kaliningrad Oblast	489,735
Kaluga	Kaluga Oblast	333,954
Kamensk-Uralsky	Sverdlovsk Oblast	162,177
Kamyshin	Volgograd Oblast	105,471
Kaspiysk	Dagestan	125,747
Kazan	Tatarstan	1,314,685
Kemerovo	Kemerovo Oblast	549,362
Khabarovsk	Khabarovsk Krai	617,168
Khanty-Mansiysk	Khanty-Mansi Autonomous Okrug	109,745
Khasavyurt	Dagestan	157,466
Khimki	Moscow Oblast	257,006
Kirov	Kirov Oblast	471,754
Kislovodsk	Stavropol Krai	126,674
Kolomna	Moscow Oblast	133,019
Komsomolsk-on-Amur	Khabarovsk Krai	236,158
Kopeysk	Chelyabinsk Oblast	146,125
Korolyov	Moscow Oblast	226,936
Kostroma	Kostroma Oblast	265,965
Kovrov	Vladimir Oblast	130,327
Krasnodar	Krasnodar Krai	1,121,291
Krasnogorsk	Moscow Oblast	188,850
Krasnoyarsk	Krasnoyarsk Krai	1,196,913
Kurgan	Kurgan Oblast	305,505
Kursk	Kursk Oblast	434,703
Kyzyl	Tuva	128,149
Lipetsk	Lipetsk Oblast	490,428
Lyubertsy	Moscow Oblast	230,134
Magnitogorsk	Chelyabinsk Oblast	409,255
Makhachkala	Dagestan	622,660
Maykop	Adygea	139,687
Miass	Chelyabinsk Oblast	147,449
Mikhaylovsk	Stavropol Krai	112,793
Moscow	Moscow	13,104,177
Murmansk	Murmansk Oblast	267,422
Murino	Leningrad Oblast	104,611
Murom	Vladimir Oblast	105,995
Mytishchi	Moscow Oblast	266,436
Naberezhnye Chelny	Tatarstan	545,750
Nakhodka	Primorsky Krai	136,096
Nalchik	Kabardino-Balkaria	245,961
Nazran	Ingushetia	124,086
Neftekamsk	Bashkortostan	133,300
Nefteyugansk	Khanty-Mansi Autonomous Okrug	124,989
Nevinnomyssk	Stavropol Krai	115,826
Nizhnekamsk	Tatarstan	241,106
Nizhnevartovsk	Khanty-Mansi Autonomous Okrug	287,095
Nizhny Novgorod	Nizhny Novgorod Oblast	1,213,477
Nizhny Tagil	Sverdlovsk Oblast	334,209
Noginsk	Moscow Oblast	102,205
Norilsk	Krasnoyarsk Krai	174,747
Novocheboksarsk	Chuvashia	120,147
Novocherkassk	Rostov Oblast	160,782
Novokuznetsk	Kemerovo Oblast	533,565
Novomoskovsk	Tula Oblast	118,066
Novorossiysk	Krasnodar Krai	261,626
Novoshakhtinsk	Rostov Oblast	101,708
Novosibirsk	Novosibirsk Oblast	1,635,338
Novy Urengoy	Yamalo-Nenets Autonomous Okrug	106,764
Noyabrsk	Yamalo-Nenets Autonomous Okrug	101,235
Obninsk	Kaluga Oblast	129,584
Odintsovo	Moscow Oblast	186,172
Oktyabrsky	Bashkortostan	116,282
Omsk	Omsk Oblast	1,110,836
Orekhovo-Zuyevo	Moscow Oblast	105,542
Orenburg	Orenburg Oblast	539,236
Orsk	Orenburg Oblast	188,135
Oryol	Oryol Oblast	296,633
Penza	Penza Oblast	492,376
Perm	Perm Krai	1,027,153
Pervouralsk	Sverdlovsk Oblast	112,860
Petropavlovsk-Kamchatsky	Kamchatka Krai	162,992
Petrozavodsk	Republic of Karelia	235,793
Podolsk	Moscow Oblast	312,400
Prokopyevsk	Kemerovo Oblast	174,859
Pskov	Pskov Oblast	189,315
Pushkino	Moscow Oblast	111,738
Pyatigorsk	Stavropol Krai	144,955
Ramenskoye	Moscow Oblast	114,000
Reutov	Moscow Oblast	113,140
Rostov-on-Don	Rostov Oblast	1,135,968
Rubtsovsk	Altai Krai	124,687
Ryazan	Ryazan Oblast	523,203
Rybinsk	Yaroslavl Oblast	173,910
Saint Petersburg	Saint Petersburg	5,600,044
Salavat	Bashkortostan	147,296
Samara	Samara Oblast	1,163,645
Saransk	Mordovia	312,252
Saratov	Saratov Oblast	891,898
Serpukhov	Moscow Oblast	133,646
Severodvinsk	Arkhangelsk Oblast	156,056
Seversk	Tomsk Oblast	105,797
Shakhty	Rostov Oblast	222,489
Shchyolkovo	Moscow Oblast	135,509
Smolensk	Smolensk Oblast	312,896
Sochi	Krasnodar Krai	446,599
Stary Oskol	Belgorod Oblast	218,340
Stavropol	Stavropol Krai	550,147
Sterlitamak	Bashkortostan	279,174
Surgut	Khanty-Mansi Autonomous Okrug	406,938
Syktyvkar	Komi Republic	220,042
Syzran	Samara Oblast	163,303
Taganrog	Rostov Oblast	242,327
Tambov	Tambov Oblast	258,546
Tolyatti	Samara Oblast	674,630
Tomsk	Tomsk Oblast	551,504
Tula	Tula Oblast	466,609
Tver	Tver Oblast	414,756
Tyumen	Tyumen Oblast	855,618
Ufa	Bashkortostan	1,157,994
Ulan-Ude	Buryatia	436,138
Ulyanovsk	Ulyanovsk Oblast	613,334
Ussuriysk	Primorsky Krai	179,862
Veliky Novgorod	Novgorod Oblast	223,191
Vidnoye	Moscow Oblast	103,957
Vladikavkaz	North Ossetia-Alania	292,886
Vladimir	Vladimir Oblast	346,771
Vladivostok	Primorsky Krai	597,237
Volgodonsk	Rostov Oblast	165,567
Volgograd	Volgograd Oblast	1,025,662
Vologda	Vologda Oblast	311,628
Volzhsky	Volgograd Oblast	316,544
Voronezh	Voronezh Oblast	1,051,995
Yakutsk	Sakha	361,154
Yaroslavl	Yaroslavl Oblast	570,824
Yekaterinburg	Sverdlovsk Oblast	1,539,371
Yessentuki	Stavropol Krai	121,534
Yoshkar-Ola	Mari El	283,469
Yuzhno-Sakhalinsk	Sakhalin Oblast	180,467
Zhukovsky	Moscow Oblast	110,507
Zlatoust	Chelyabinsk Oblast	159,662

== Rwanda ==
City	Province	Population (2022)
Kigali	Kigali	1,517,168
Gisenyi	Ouest	252,090
Ruhengeri	Nord	153,368

== Saudi Arabia ==
No.	City	Province	Population (2010)
1	Riyadh	Riyadh	5,188,300
2	Jiddah	Mecca	3,430,700
3	Makkah	Mecca	1,534,700
4	Al-Madinah	Medina	1,100,100
5	Ad-Dammam	Eastern	903,300
6	Al-Hufuf	Eastern	660,800
7	At-Ta'if	Mecca	580,000
8	Tabuk	Tabuk	512,600
9	Buraydah	Al-Qassim	467,400
10	Khamis Mushayt	'Asir	430,800
11	Al-Jubayl	Eastern	337,800
12	Ha'il	Ḥaʼil	310,900
13	Najran	Najran	298,300
14	Hafar al-Batin	Eastern	271,600
15	Ath-Thuqbah	Eastern	238,100
16	Abha	'Asir	236,200
17	Yanbu al-Bahr	Medina	233,200
18	Al-Khubar	Eastern	219,700
19	Ar'ar	Northern Borders	167,100
20	Unayzah	Al-Qassim	152,900
21	Sekaka	Al-Jawf	150,300
22	Al-Hawiyah	Mecca	148,200
23	Dhahran	Eastern	120,500
24	Al-Qatif	Eastern	118,300
25	Al-Qurrayyat	Al-Jawf	116,200

== Senegal ==
City	Province	Population (2013)
Dakar	Dakar	2,646,500
Diourbel	Diourbel	133,700
Kaolack	Kaolack	233,700
Louga	Louga	104,300
Mbour	Thiès	232,800
Rufisque	Dakar	221,100
Saint-Louis	Saint-Louis	209,800
Tambacounda	Tambacounda	107,300
Thiès	Thiès	317,800
Touba	Diourbel	753,300
Ziguinchor	Ziguinchor	205,300

== Serbia ==
City	Statistical Region	Population (2015)
Beograd	Belgrade	1,369,400
Kragujevac	Šumadija and Western Serbia	150,800
Niš	Southern and Eastern Serbia	186,200
Novi Sad	Vojvodina	285,500
Subotica	Vojvodina	104,400

== Sierra Leone ==
City	Province	Population (2021)
Freetown	Western	609,174
Kenema	Eastern	255,110
Bo	Southern	223,075
Koidu	Eastern	196,418

== Singapore ==
City	Population (2024)
Singapore	6,036,860

== Slovakia ==
City	Region	Population (2023)
Bratislava	Bratislava	478,040
Kosice	Košice	225,044

== Slovenia ==
City	Municipality	Population (2024)
Ljubljana	Ljubljana	288,382

== Solomon Islands ==
City	Province	Population (2019)
Honiara	Honiara	129,569

== Somalia ==
City	Region	Population (2005)
Afgooye	Lower Shabelle	135,000
Balcad	Middle Shabelle	120,400
Baardheere	Gedo	106,200
Baydhaba	Bay	227,800
Belet Weyne	Hiraan	144,300
Borama	Awdal (Somaliland)	215,600
Bossaso	Bari	164,900
Burco	Togdheer (Somaliland)	288,200
Buur Hakaba	Bay	125,600
Ceerigaabo	Sanaag (Somaliland)	114,800
Gaalkacyo	Mudug	137,700
Hargeysa	Woqooyi Galbee (Somaliland)	560,000
Jamaame	Lower Juba	129,100
Jilib	Middle Juba	113,400
Jowhar	Middle Shabelle	218,000
Kismaayo	Lower Juba	166,700
Marka	Lower Shabelle	192,900
Mogadishu	Banaadir	1,650,200 (as per 2014)
Qoryooley	Lower Shabelle	134,200
Wanla Weyn	Lower Shabelle	155,600

== South Africa ==
City	Province	Population (2011)
Benoni	Gauteng	158,777
Bloemfontein	Free State	464,600
Botshabelo	Free State	181,700
Cape Town	Western Cape	3,431,000
Carletonville	Gauteng	149,100
Durban	KwaZulu-Natal	2,786,000
East London	Eastern Cape	295,600
Embalenhle	Mpumalanga	118,900
Evaton	Gauteng	605,500
George	Western Cape	157,400
Johannesburg	Gauteng	7,860,800
Kimberley	Northern Cape	225,200
Klerksdorp	North West	189,500
Ladysmith	KwaZulu-Natal	119,700
Mdantsane	Eastern Cape	171,500
Middelburg	Mpumalanga	163,800
Mthatha	Eastern Cape	137,600
Newcastle	KwaZulu-Natal	291,500
Paarl	Western Cape	197,700
Pietermaritzburg	KwaZulu-Natal	475,200
Polokwane	Limpopo	227,400
Gqeberha	Eastern Cape	876,400
Potchefstroom	North West	148,800
Pretoria	Gauteng	1,763,300
Rustenburg	North West	311,900
Sasolburg	Free State	113,400
Somerset West	Western Cape	188,000
Soshanguve	Gauteng	728,100
Stanger	KwaZulu-Natal	134,500
Uitenhage	Eastern Cape	242,900
Vereeniging	Gauteng	377,900
Welkom	Free State	211,000
Witbank	Mpumalanga	311,700

== South Korea ==
City	Region	Population (2016)
Andong	Yeongnam	159,400
Ansan	Seoul Capital Area	716,700
Anseong	Seoul Capital Area	203,000
Anyang	Seoul Capital Area	595,600
Asan	Hoseo	340,500
Bucheon	Seoul Capital Area	848,100
Busan	Yeongnam	3,388,600
Changwon	Yeongnam	1,070,200
Cheonan	Hoseo	666,400
Cheongju	Hoseo	833,200
Chuncheon	Gwandong	284,600
Chungju	Hoseo	218,400
Daegu	Yeongnam	2,449,700
Daejeon	Hoseo	1,533,400
Dangjin	Hoseo	169,000
Gangneung	Gwandong	216,500
Geoje	Yeongnam	247,000
Gimcheon	Yeongnam	139,100
Gimhae	Yeongnam	550,800
Gimpo	Seoul Capital Area	427,800
Gongju	Hoseo	108,300
Goyang	Seoul Capital Area	990,100
Gumi	Yeongnam	427,800
Gunpo	Seoul Capital Area	275,600
Gunsan	Honam	269,000
Guri	Seoul Capital Area	192,000
Gwangju	Honam	1,517,100
Gwangju	Seoul Capital Area	286,700
Gwangyang	Honam	143,900
Gwangmyeong	Seoul Capital Area	298,100
Gyeongju	Yeongnam	261,800
Gyeongsan	Yeongnam	283,700
Hanam	Seoul Capital Area	279,800
Hwaseong	Seoul Capital Area	640,900
Iksan	Honam	285,300
Incheon	Seoul Capital Area	2,914,500
Icheon	Seoul Capital Area	226,200
Jecheon	Hoseo	134,800
Jeju	Jeju Province	593,500
Jeongeup	Honam	106,700
Jeonju	Honam	652,400
Jinju	Yeongnam	352,400
Miryang	Yeongnam	103,200
Mokpo	Honam	224,500
Naju	Honam	113,300
Namyangju	Seoul Capital Area	713,300
Nonsan	Hoseo	119,700
Osan	Seoul Capital Area	240,600
Paju	Seoul Capital Area	427,700
Pocheon	Seoul Capital Area	157,900
Pohang	Yeongnam	516,500
Pyeongtaek	Seoul Capital Area	500,800
Sacheon	Yeongnam	111,100
Sejong	Hoseo	227,300
Seogwipo	Jeju Province	178,600
Seoul	Seoul Capital Area	9,834,700
Seongnam	Seoul Capital Area	994,200
Seosan	Hoseo	176,400
Siheung	Seoul Capital Area	511,800
Suncheon	Honam	272,400
Suwon	Seoul Capital Area	1,210,200
Tongyeong	Yeongnam	123,000
Uijeongbu	Seoul Capital Area	436,500
Uiwang	Seoul Capital Area	160,200
Ulsan	Yeongnam	1,146,800
Wonju	Gwandong	332,800
Yangju	Seoul Capital Area	233,300
Yangsan	Yeongnam	351,200
Yeoju	Seoul Capital Area	113,400
Yeongcheon	Yeongnam	100,300
Yeongju	Yeongnam	103,800
Yeosu	Honam	271,500
Yongin	Seoul Capital Area	971,300

== South Sudan ==
City	State	Population (2008)
Juba	Central Equatoria	230,195
Wau	Western Bahr el Ghazal	118,331
Malakal	Upper Nile	114,528
Yambio	Western Equatoria	105,881

== Spain ==
City	Autonomous Community	Population (2023)
Albacete	Castilla–La Mancha	173,206
Alcalá de Henares	Community of Madrid	199,184
Alcobendas	Community of Madrid	119,416
Alcorcón	Community of Madrid	171,772
Algeciras	Andalusia	123,639
Alicante	Valencian Community	349,282
Almería	Andalusia	200,578
Badajoz	Extremadura	150,190
Badalona	Catalonia	225,957
Barakaldo	Basque Country	101,229
Barcelona	Catalonia	1,660,122
Bilbao	Basque Country	346,096
Burgos	Castile and León	174,451
Cádiz	Andalusia	111,811
Cartagena	Region of Murcia	218,050
Castellón de la Plana	Valencian Community	176,238
Córdoba	Andalusia	323,763
A Coruña	Galicia	247,376
Dos Hermanas	Andalusia	138,981
Elche	Valencian Community	238,293
Fuenlabrada	Community of Madrid	188,736
Getafe	Community of Madrid	185,899
Gijón	Asturias	268,313
Girona	Catalonia	104,320
Granada	Andalusia	230,595
L'Hospitalet de Llobregat	Catalonia	274,455
Huelva	Andalusia	142,532
Jaén	Andalusia	111,888
Jérez de la Frontera	Andalusia	213,231
Leganés	Community of Madrid	190,665
León	Castile and León	121,281
Lleida	Catalonia	143,094
Logroño	La Rioja	150,583
Madrid	Community of Madrid	3,332,035
Málaga	Andalusia	586,384
Marbella	Andalusia	156,295
Mataró	Catalonia	129,870
Móstoles	Community of Madrid	211,265
Murcia	Region of Murcia	469,177
Ourense	Galicia	104,250
Oviedo	Asturias	217,584
Palma de Mallorca	Balearic Islands	423,350
Las Palmas	Canary Islands	378,027
Pamplona	Navarre	205,762
Parla	Community of Madrid	133,004
Reus	Catalonia	108,479
Rivas-Vaciamadrid	Community of Madrid	100,275
Roquetas de Mar	Andalusia	106,510
Sabadell	Catalonia	218,300
Salamanca	Castile and León	143,954
San Cristóbal de La Laguna	Canary Islands	159,034
San Sebastián	Basque Country	188,743
Santa Coloma de Gramenet	Catalonia	119,862
Santa Cruz de Tenerife	Canary Islands	209,395
Santander	Cantabria	172,726
Seville	Andalusia	684,025
Tarragona	Catalonia	138,262
Telde	Canary Islands	102,487
Terrassa	Catalonia	225,277
Torrejón de Ardoz	Community of Madrid	137,711
Valencia	Valencian Community	807,693
Valladolid	Castile and León	297,459
Vigo	Galicia	293,652
Vitoria-Gasteiz	Basque Country	255,886
Zaragoza	Aragon	682,513

== Sri Lanka ==
City	Province	Population (2001)
Colombo	Western	647,100
Dehiwala-Mount Lavinia	Western	210,500
Kalmunai	Eastern	106,780
Kandy	Central	109,300
Moratuwa	Western	177,600
Negombo	Western	121,700
Sri Jayawardanapura Kotte	Western	116,400

== Sudan ==
City	State	Population (2008)
Ad-Damazin	Blue Nile	136,800
Ad-Du'ayn	East Darfur	137,100
Al-Fashir	North Darfur	217,800
Al-Junaynah	West Darfur	134,300
Al-Khartum	Khartoum	1,410,900
Al-Khartum Bahri	Khartoum	1,012,200
Al-Qadarif	Al Qadarif	269,400
Al-Ubayyid	North Kordofan	345,100
'Atbarah	River Nile	112,000
Bur Sudan	Red Sea	394,600
Kassala	Kassala	298,500
Kusti	White Nile	213,100
Nyala	South Darfur	493,000
Rabak	White Nile	123,900
Sannar	Sennar	123,200
Umm Durman	Khartoum	1,849,700
Wad Madani	Gezira	298,500

== Suriname ==
City	District	Population (2012)
Paramaribo	Paramaribo	240,924

== Sweden ==
City	County	Population (2020)
Gothenburg	Västra Götaland	655,100
Helsingborg	Skåne	113,800
Jönköping	Jönköping	101,100
Linköping	Östergötland	119,000
Malmö	Skåne	324,000
Örebro	Örebro	126,000
Stockholm	Stockholm	1,766,100
Uppsala	Uppsala	167,300
Västerås	Västmanland	128,500
Gävle	Gävleborg	105,000

== Switzerland ==
City	Canton	Population (2021)
Basel	Basel-Stadt	173,100
Bern	Bern	134,300
Geneva	Geneva	203,400
Lausanne	Vaud	140,600
Winterthur	Zürich	115,100
Zürich	Zürich	423,200

== Syria ==
City	Governorate	Population (2008)
Aleppo	Aleppo	4,450,000
Al-Hasakeh	Al-Hasakah	1,392,000
Al-Raqqah	Raqqa	865,000
Al-Sweida	As-Suwayda	349,000
Damascus	Damascus	4,209,000
Deir El-Zor	Deir ez-Zor	1,111,000
Dra'a	Daraa	930,000
Hama	Hama	1,508,000
Homs	Homs	1,667,000
Idleb	Idlib	1,376,000
Lattakia	Latakia	951,000
Tartous	Tartus	756,000

== See also ==
- World’s largest cities
