= Rana Ahmed Ateeq Anwar =

Pakistani politician

- رانا احمد عتیق انور

Member of the National Assembly of Pakistan
- Incumbent
- Assumed office 29 February 2024
- Constituency: NA-113 Sheikhupura-I

Personal details
- Party: PMLN (2024-present)
- Relations: Rana Tanveer Hussain (uncle)
- Parent: Rana Afzaal Hussain (father)

Rana Ahmed Ateeq Anwar (Urdu: رانا احمد عتیق انور) is a Pakistani politician who has been a member of the National Assembly of Pakistan since February 2024.

== Political career ==
He was elected to the National Assembly of Pakistan in the 2024 Pakistani general election from NA-113 Sheikhupura-I as a candidate of Pakistan Muslim League (N) (PML(N)). He received 119,407 votes while runner-up Rahat Amanullah, an candidate Independent supported (PTI) Pakistan Tehreek-e-Insaf, received 90,872 votes.
