= Kotwar, Sheikhupura =

Village in Punjab, Pakistan

Coordinates: 31°34′N 73°41′E

Kotwar is a village in Sheikhupura District of Punjab in Pakistan.
