= NA-134 (Sheikhupura-IV) =

Former Pakistani national assembly constituency (2002 to 2018)

- Former constituency for the National Assembly of Pakistan
- Region: Safdarabad Tehsil and Sheikhupura Tehsil of Sheikhupura District

Former constituency
- Abolished: 2018
- Replaced by: NA-121 (Sheikhupura-III) and NA-122 (Sheikhupura-IV)

NA-134 (Sheikhupura-IV) (Urdu: این اے-۱۳۴، شيخوپوره-۴) was a constituency of the National Assembly of Pakistan, located in Sheikhupura District, Punjab. It existed from 2002 to 2018 and covered parts of Safdarabad Tehsil and Sheikhupura Tehsil. Following the 2018 delimitation, the constituency was abolished and its area was redistributed across NA-121 (Sheikhupura-III) and NA-122 (Sheikhupura-IV).

== Area ==
The constituency covered the following administrative areas:

- The following area of Safdarabad Tehsil:
  - Bahalike
- The following areas of Sheikhupura Tehsil:
  - Farooqabad
  - Ajnianwala
  - Jandiala Sher Khan
  - Town Committee Jandiala Sher Khan
  - Ghang
  - Ghazi Minara
  - Machike

== Members of Parliament ==
Election	Member	Party
2002	Khurram Munawar Manj	PPP
2008	Sardar Muhammad Irfan Dogar	PML-N
2013	Sardar Muhammad Irfan Dogar	PML-N

== 2002 general election ==
General elections were held on 10 October 2002. Khurram Munawar Manj of the PPP won the seat with 44,073 votes.

General election 2002: NA-134 Sheikhupura-IV
Party	Candidate	Votes	%	±%
PPP	Khurram Munawar Manj	44,073	40.03	
PML(N)	Sardar Muhammad Irfan Dogar	32,113	29.17	
PML(Q)	Muhammad Javed Bhatti	31,609	28.71	
Others	Others (five candidates)	2,311	2.09	
Turnout		113,879	46.00	
Total valid votes		110,106	96.69	
Rejected ballots		3,773	3.31	
Majority		11,960	10.86	
Registered electors		247,581		

== 2008 general election ==
General elections were held on 18 February 2008. Sardar Muhammad Irfan Dogar of PML-N won the seat with 47,925 votes.

General election 2008: NA-134 Sheikhupura-IV
Party	Candidate	Votes	%	±%
PML(N)	Sardar Muhammad Irfan Dogar	47,925	45.65	
PML(Q)	Khurram Munawar Manj	32,928	31.37	
PPP	Noor ul Ain Rai Saeed	21,752	20.72	
Others	Others (five candidates)	2,376	2.26	
Turnout		107,785	51.63	
Total valid votes		104,981	97.40	
Rejected ballots		2,804	2.60	
Majority		14,997	14.28	
Registered electors		208,782		

== 2013 general election ==
General elections were held on 11 May 2013. Sardar Muhammad Irfan Dogar of PML-N retained the seat with 44,397 votes.

General election 2013: NA-134 Sheikhupura-IV
Party	Candidate	Votes	%	±%
PML(N)	Sardar Muhammad Irfan Dogar	44,397	30.32	
Independent	Khan Sher Akbar Khan	41,103	28.07	
PML(Q)	Khurram Munawar Manj	39,363	26.88	
PTI	Shafqat Ali	14,131	9.65	
Others	Others (eleven candidates)	7,449	5.08	
Turnout		152,048	60.78	
Total valid votes		146,443	96.31	
Rejected ballots		5,605	3.69	
Majority		3,294	2.25	
Registered electors		250,183		
