= Adil Garh =

- Village
- Location within Pakistan
- Coordinates: 32°18′48″N 74°05′46″E
- Country: Pakistan
- Province: Punjab
- District: Sheikhupura

Population (1998)
  - Total: 3,131
- Time zone: UTC+5 (PST)

Adil Garh is a village in Sheikhupura District, Punjab, Pakistan.
