= NA-133 (Sheikhupura-III) =

Former constituency of the National Assembly of Pakistan, 2002 to 2018

- Former constituency for the National Assembly of Pakistan
- Region: Sheikhupura Tehsil and Ferozewala Tehsil of Sheikhupura District

Former constituency
- Abolished: 2018
- Replaced by: NA-120 (Sheikhupura-II) and NA-121 (Sheikhupura-III)

NA-133 (Sheikhupura-III) (Urdu: این اے-۱۳۳، شيخوپوره-۳) was a constituency of the National Assembly of Pakistan, located in Sheikhupura District, Punjab. It existed from 2002 to 2018 and covered parts of Sheikhupura Tehsil and Ferozewala Tehsil. Following the 2018 delimitation, the constituency was abolished and its area was redistributed across NA-120 (Sheikhupura-II) and NA-121 (Sheikhupura-III).

== Area ==
The constituency covered the following administrative areas:

- Municipal Corporation Sheikhupura
- The following areas of Sheikhupura Tehsil:
  - Sheikhupura Qanungo Halqa (excluding Ghazi Minara, Machike and Ghang)
  - Sahuki Malian
  - Mudke
  - Muradey Kalan
  - Ghazi Androon
  - Noor Pur Virkan
- The following areas of Ferozewala Tehsil:
  - Galo
  - Kala
  - Khanpur
  - Mandiali

== Members of Parliament ==
Election	Member	Party
2002	Muhammad Saeed Virk	PML-Q
2008	Mian Javed Latif	PML-N
2013	Mian Javed Latif	PML-N

== 2002 general election ==
General elections were held on 10 October 2002. Muhammad Saeed Virk of PML-Q won the seat with 30,105 votes.

General election 2002: NA-133 Sheikhupura-III
Party	Candidate	Votes	%	±%
PML(Q)	Muhammad Saeed Virk	30,105	34.37	
PML(N)	Mian Muhammad Munawar Latif	24,869	28.40	
MMA	Ch. Nazir Ahmad Virk	14,355	16.39	
PPP	Malik Mushtaq Ahmad	11,114	12.69	
PAT	Mian Abdul Rauf	2,776	3.17	
Others	Others (six candidates)	4,366	4.98	
Turnout		91,377	39.65	
Total valid votes		87,582	95.85	
Rejected ballots		3,795	4.15	
Majority		5,236	5.97	
Registered electors		230,454		

== 2008 general election ==
General elections were held on 18 February 2008. Mian Javed Latif of PML-N won the seat with 44,786 votes.

General election 2008: NA-133 Sheikhupura-III
Party	Candidate	Votes	%	±%
PML(N)	Mian Javed Latif	44,786	45.73	
PML(Q)	Ch. Muhammad Saeed Virk	28,005	28.60	
PPP	Malik Mushtaq Ahmad	16,228	16.57	
Independent	Imran Yousaf Munj	5,894	6.02	
Independent	Shaukat Ali Kausar	2,321	2.37	
Others	Others (six candidates)	700	0.71	
Turnout		101,893	45.73	
Total valid votes		97,934	96.12	
Rejected ballots		3,959	3.88	
Majority		16,781	17.13	
Registered electors		222,833		

== 2013 general election ==
General elections were held on 11 May 2013. Mian Javed Latif of PML-N retained the seat with 68,909 votes.

General election 2013: NA-133 Sheikhupura-III
Party	Candidate	Votes	%	±%
PML(N)	Mian Javed Latif	68,909	43.98	
Independent	Muhammad Saeed Virk	31,520	20.12	
PTI	Abu Bakar Virk	25,874	16.52	
Independent	Muhammad Nawaz	15,717	10.03	
PPP	Altaf Hussain Virk	4,796	3.06	
JI	Khalid Mahmood Virk	4,623	2.95	
Others	Others (fifteen candidates)	5,232	3.34	
Turnout		161,161	55.33	
Total valid votes		156,671	97.21	
Rejected ballots		4,490	2.79	
Majority		37,389	23.86	
Registered electors		291,283		
