= Ali Asghar Manda =

Pakistani politician (born 1966)

Member of the Provincial Assembly of the Punjab
- In office 2008 – 31 May 2018
- Constituency: PP-165 Sheikhupura-IV

Personal details
- Born: 8 September 1966 (age 60) Sheikhupura, Punjab, Pakistan
- Party: PTI (2018-present)
- Other political affiliations: PMLN (2013-2018); IND (2013); PMLN (2008-2002); PPP (1993); IJI (1988)

Ali Asghar Manda is a Pakistani politician who was a Member of the Provincial Assembly of the Punjab, from 2008 to May 2018.

== Early life and education ==
Manda was born on 8 September 1966 in Sheikhupura. He has a degree of Master of Arts in Political Science from the University of the Punjab which he obtained in 1993 and has a degree of Bachelor of Laws LL. B. which he obtained in 1996 from Quaid-e-Azam Law College in Lahore.

== Political career ==
Manda ran for the seat of the Provincial Assembly of the Punjab as a candidate of Islami Jamhoori Ittehad (IJI) from Constituency PP-135 (Sheikhupura-II) in the 1988 Pakistani general election but was unsuccessful. He received 589 votes and lost the seat to Chaudhry Bashir Ahmed, a candidate of the Pakistan Peoples Party (PPP). In the 1993 Pakistani general election, he ran for the seat of the Provincial Assembly of the Punjab as an independent candidate from Constituency PP-135 (Sheikhupura-II) in but was, again, unsuccessful. He received 62 votes and lost the seat to Chaudhry Bashir Ahmed, a candidate of PPP. Later, he ran for the seat of the Provincial Assembly of the Punjab as an independent candidate from Constituency PP-165 (Sheikhupura-IV) in the 2002 Pakistani general election but was unsuccessful. He received 71 votes and lost the seat to Jehanzaib Rao, a candidate of Pakistan Muslim League (N) (PML-N).

In the 2008 Pakistani general election, Manda was elected to the Provincial Assembly of the Punjab as a candidate of PML-N from Constituency PP-165 (Sheikhupura-IV). He received 21,153 votes and defeated Javaid Nasarullah, an independent candidate. He was re-elected to the Provincial Assembly of the Punjab as an independent candidate from Constituency PP-165 (Sheikhupura-IV) in the 2013 Pakistani general election. He received 37,741 votes and defeated Sahabzada Mian Saeed Ahmad Sharqpuri, a candidate of PML-N. In the same election, he ran for the seat of the National Assembly of Pakistan as an independent candidate from Constituency NA-132 (Sheikhupura-II-cum-Nankana Sahib) but was unsuccessful. He received 199 votes and lost the seat to Rana Tanveer Hussain. He joined PML-N in May 2013.

In December 2013, Manda was appointed as Parliamentary Secretary for Services & General Administration Department. In April 2018, he quit PML-N. In May 2018, he joined Pakistan Tehreek-e-Insaf (PTI).
