= PP-146 Lahore-II =

Constituency of the Provincial Assembly of Punjab, Pakistan

- Constituency for the Provincial Assembly of Punjab
- Region: Lahore City in Lahore District

Current constituency
- Created from: PP-138 Lahore-II (2002-2018); PP-145 Lahore-II (2018-2023)

PP-146 Lahore-II (پی پی-146، لاہور-2) is a Constituency of the Provincial Assembly of Punjab.

== General elections 2024 ==
Provincial election 2024: PP-146 Lahore-II
Party	Candidate	Votes	%	±%
PML(N)	Ghazali Saleem Butt	30,588	36.40	
Independent	Junaid Razzaq (Note: Filed nomination papers as PTI candidate but ECP allowed him to run as an Independent)	28,516	33.93	
TLP	Muhammad Akram	16,021	19.06	
Independent	Malik Muhammad Latif	2,451	2.92	
Others	Others (fifteen candidates)	6,467	7.69	
Turnout		86,575	38.31	
Total valid votes		84,043	97.08	
Rejected ballots		2,532	2.92	
Majority		2,072	2.47	
Registered electors		225,977		
hold				

== General elections 2018 ==
Provincial election 2018: PP-145 Lahore-II
Party	Candidate	Votes	%	±%
PML(N)	Ghazali Saleem Butt	47,345	49.10	
PTI	Malik Muhammad Asif Javaid	27,915	28.95	
TLP	Muhammad Ghafoor	13,137	13.62	
Independent	Mahad Qaiser Butt	4,387	4.55	
PPP	Shahbaz Mahmood Bhatti	1,603	1.66	
MMA	Babar Farooq	1,339	1.39	
Others	Others (nine candidates)	698	0.73	
Turnout		98,333	51.33	
Total valid votes		96,424	98.06	
Rejected ballots		1,909	1.94	
Majority		19,430	20.15	
Registered electors		191,590		

== General elections 2013 ==
Provincial election 2013: PP-138 Lahore-II
Party	Candidate	Votes	%	±%
PML(N)	Ghazali Saleem Butt	47,051	58.80	
PTI	Mian Mehmood Ahmad	17,806	22.25	
PPP	Faraz Hashmi	6,983	8.73	
JI	Ch. Muhammad Aslam	1,753	2.19	
Independent	Nadeem Hameed	1,538	1.92	
Others	Others (thirty two candidates)	4,887	6.11	
Turnout		81,391	47.28	
Total valid votes		80,018	98.31	
Rejected ballots		1,373	1.69	
Majority		29,245	36.55	
Registered electors		172,144		

== General elections 2008 ==
Contesting candidates	Party affiliation	Votes polled

== See also ==
- PP-145 Lahore-I
- PP-147 Lahore-III
