= PP-145 Lahore-I =

Constituency of the Provincial Assembly of Punjab, Pakistan

- Constituency for the Provincial Assembly of Punjab
- Region: Shahdara area of Lahore City in Lahore District

Current constituency
- Created from: PP-137 Lahore-I (2002-2018); PP-144 Lahore-I (2018-2023)

PP-145 Lahore-I (پی پی-145، لاہور-1) is a Constituency of Provincial Assembly of Punjab.

== General elections 2024 ==
Provincial election 2024: PP-145 Lahore-I
Party	Candidate	Votes	%	±%
PML(N)	Sami Ullah Khan	42,578	36.80	
Independent	Muhammad Yasir (Note: Filed nomination papers as PTI candidate but ECP allowed him to run as an Independent)	38,267	33.07	
TLP	Muhammad Umair Jahangir	17,340	14.99	
Independent	Abid Khan	9,134	7.89	
Others	Others (twenty two candidates)	8,382	7.25	
Turnout		118,484	44.04	
Total valid votes		115,701	97.65	
Rejected ballots		2,783	2.35	
Majority		4,311	3.73	
Registered electors		269,034		
hold				

== General elections 2018 ==
Provincial election 2018: PP-144 Lahore-I
Party	Candidate	Votes	%	±%
PML(N)	Sami Ullah Khan	45,538	47.25	
PTI	Chaudhary Khalid Mehmood	37,029	38.42	
TLP	Muhammad Umair Jahangir	9,930	10.30	
Independent	Syed Asghar Raza Naqvi	1,448	1.50	
PPP	Zaib Un Nisa	1,092	1.13	
Others	Others (ten candidates)	1,345	1.40	
Turnout		98,049	51.19	
Total valid votes		96,382	98.30	
Rejected ballots		1,667	1.70	
Majority		8,509	8.83	
Registered electors		191,536		

== General elections 2013 ==
Provincial election 2013: PP-137 Lahore-I
Party	Candidate	Votes	%	±%
PML(N)	Khawaja Imran Nazeer	50,936	59.74	
PTI	Muhammad Yasir	20,621	24.18	
JI	Ali Imran	4,432	5.20	
Independent	Azeem Yaseen	2,988	3.50	
Independent	Abdul Majeed	2,041	2.39	
PML(Q)	M. Yousaf Ahad Malik	1,071	1.26	
Others	Others (eighteen candidates)	3,180	3.73	
Turnout		87,330	53.87	
Total valid votes		85,269	97.64	
Rejected ballots		2,061	2.36	
Majority		30,315	35.56	
Registered electors		162,112		

== General elections 2008 ==
Contesting candidates	Party affiliation	Votes polled

== See also ==
- PP-144 Sheikhupura-IX
- PP-146 Lahore-II
