= Irfan Dogar =

Pakistani politician

Muhammad Irfan Dogar
- محمد عرفان ڈوگر

Member of the National Assembly of Pakistan
- In office 13 August 2018 – 10 August 2023
- Constituency: NA-122 (Sheikhupura-IV)
- In office 2008 – 31 May 2018
- Constituency: NA-134 (Sheikhupura-IV)

Personal details
- Born: 25 December 1973 (age 52)
- Other political affiliations: PMLN (2008-2023)

Sardar Muhammad Irfan Dogar (Urdu: سردار محمد عرفان ڈوگر; born 25 December 1973) is a Pakistani politician who had been a member of the National Assembly of Pakistan from August 2018 till August 2023. Previously he was a member of the National Assembly from 2008 to May 2018.

== Political career ==
Dogar ran for the seat of the National Assembly of Pakistan as a candidate of Pakistan Muslim League (N) from Constituency NA-134 (Sheikhupura-IV) in the 2002 Pakistani general election but was unsuccessful. He received 32,113 votes and lost the seat to Khurram Munawar Manj, a candidate of Pakistan Peoples Party.

He was elected to the National Assembly as a candidate of PML-N from Constituency NA-134 (Sheikhupura-Cum-Nankana Sahib-II) in the 2008 Pakistani general election. He received 47,925 votes and defeated Khurram Munawar Manj, a candidate of Pakistan Muslim League (Q).

Dogar was re-elected to the National Assembly as a candidate of PML-N from Constituency NA-134 (Sheikhupura-IV) in the 2013 Pakistani general election. He received 44,397 votes and defeated an independent candidate, Khan Sher Akbar Khan.

He was re-elected to the National Assembly as a candidate of PML-N from Constituency NA-122 (Sheikhupura-IV) in the 2018 Pakistani general election.
