= Mian Javed Latif =

Pakistani politician (born 1964)

- میاں جاوید لطیف

Federal Minister of Pakistan
- In office 22 April 2022 – 10 August 2023
- Prime Minister: Shehbaz Sharif

Chairman Standing Committee on Information, Broadcasting, National History and Literary Heritage
- In office September 2018 – 22 April 2022

Member of the National Assembly of Pakistan
- In office 13 August 2018 – 10 August 2023
- Constituency: NA-121 (Sheikhupura-III)
- In office 17 March 2008 – 31 May 2018
- Constituency: NA-133 (Sheikhupura-III)

Personal details
- Born: 22 February 1964 (age 62) Sheikhupura, Punjab, Pakistan
- Party: PMLN (1997-present)
- Other political affiliations: PPP (1993-1997)

Mian Javed Latif (Urdu: میاں جاوید لطیف; born 22 February 1964) is a Pakistani politician who had been a member of the National Assembly of Pakistan from August 2018 till August 2023. Previously, he was a member of the National Assembly from 2008 to May 2018 and a member of the Provincial Assembly of the Punjab from 1997 to 1999.

== Early life ==
He was born on 22 February 1964.

== Political career ==
Latif ran for the seat of the Provincial Assembly of the Punjab as an independent candidate from Constituency PP-137 (Sheikhupura-IV) in the 1993 Pakistani general election but was unsuccessful. He received 26 votes and lost the seat to a candidate of Pakistan Peoples Party (PPP).

Latif was elected to the Provincial Assembly of the Punjab as a candidate of Pakistan Muslim League (N) (PML-N) from Constituency PP-138 (Sheikhupura-V) in the 1997 Pakistani general election. He received 14,125 votes and defeated an independent candidate, Javed Bhatti.

Latif was elected to the National Assembly of Pakistan as a candidate of PML-N from Constituency NA-133 (Sheikhupura-II) in the 2008 Pakistani general election. He received 44,786 votes and defeated an independent candidate, Chaudhry Muhammad Saeed Virk, a candidate of Pakistan Muslim League (Q). (PML-Q).

He was re-elected to the National Assembly as a candidate of PML-N from Constituency NA-133 (Sheikhupura-II) in the 2013 Pakistani general election. He received 68,909 votes and defeated an independent candidate, Chaudhry Muhammad Saeed Virk.

In 2017, a scuffle broke out between Latif and Murad Saeed outside the National Assembly building. Latif reportedly verbally abused female family member of Murad Saeed. Latif later apologized for his remarks against the women family member of Saeed.

He was re-elected to the National Assembly as a candidate of PML-N from Constituency NA-121 (Sheikhupura-III) in the 2018 Pakistani general election.
