= Khan Sher Akbar Khan =

Pakistani politician

Member of the Provincial Assembly of the Punjab
- In office 15 August 2018 – 14 January 2023
- Constituency: PP-142 Sheikhupura-VIII

Personal details
- Born: 6 May 1985 (age 41)
- Party: PTI (2018-present)

Khan Sher Akbar Khan is a Pakistani politician who had been a member of the Provincial Assembly of the Punjab from August 2018 till January 2023.

== Political career ==
He was elected to the Provincial Assembly of the Punjab as a candidate of the Pakistan Tehreek-e-Insaf (PTI) from PP-142 (Sheikhupura-VIII) in the 2018 Punjab provincial election.

He ran for a seat in the Provincial Assembly from PP-142 Sheikhupura-VIII as a candidate of the PTI in the 2024 Punjab provincial election.
