= NA-133 =

NA-133 may refer to:

- NA-133 (Lahore-XI), a constituency for the National Assembly of Pakistan
- NA-133 (Sheikhupura-III), a former constituency for the National Assembly of Pakistan
- NA-133, company designation of a proposed naval variant of the North American P-51 Mustang
