= Muhammad Awais =

Pakistani politician

Muhammad Awais is a Pakistani politician who has been a Member of the Provincial Assembly of the Punjab since 2024.

== Political career ==
He was elected to the Provincial Assembly of the Punjab as a Pakistan Tehreek-e-Insaf-backed independent candidate from constituency PP-140 Sheikhupura-V in the 2024 Pakistani general election.
