= NA-134 =

NA-134 may refer to either:

- NA-134 (Lahore-XII), a constituency for the National Assembly of Pakistan
- NA-134 (Sheikhupura-IV), a former constituency for the National Assembly of Pakistan
