= Rana Afzaal Hussain =

Pakistani politician (1947–2024)

- رانا افضال حسین

Member of the National Assembly of Pakistan
- In office 2008 – 31 May 2018
- Constituency: NA-131 (Sheikhupura-I)

Member of the Provincial Assembly of the Punjab
- In office 29 April 2024 – 26 August 2024
- Constituency: PP-139 Sheikhupura-IV

Personal details
- Born: 2 July 1947 Sheikupura, Punjab, Pakistan
- Died: 26 August 2024 (aged 77) Sheikhupura, Punjab, Pakistan
- Party: PMLN (2008-2024)
- Children: Rana Ahmed Ateeq Anwar (son)
- Relatives: Rana Tanveer Hussain (brother)

Rana Afzaal Hussain (Urdu: رانا افضال حسین; 2 July 1947 – 26 August 2024) was a Pakistani politician who was a member of the National Assembly of Pakistan from 2008 to May 2018, and a member of the Provincial Assembly of the Punjab from April 2024 till his death.

== Life and career ==
Hussain was born on 2 July 1947.

He ran for the seat of the National Assembly of Pakistan as an independent candidate from NA-131 (Sheikhupura-I) in the 2002 Pakistani general election but was unsuccessful. He received 3,075 votes and lost the seat to Zulfiqar Ahmad Dhillon, a candidate of Pakistan Muslim League (Q) (PML-Q).

Hussain was elected to the National Assembly as a candidate of Pakistan Muslim League (N) (PML-N) from NA-131 (Sheikhupura-I) in by-election held in June 2008. He received 119,180 votes and defeated Zulfiqar Ahmed Dhillon, a candidate of PML-Q. The seat became vacant after Rana Tanveer Hussain who won the 2008 election, vacated it to retain the seat in NA-132.

He was re-elected to the National Assembly as a candidate of PML-N from Constituency NA-131 (Sheikhupura-I) in the 2013 Pakistani general election. He received 73,742 votes and defeated an independent candidate, Umar Aftab Dhillon. In the same election, he also ran for the seat of the National Assembly as an independent candidate from Constituency NA-132 (Sheikhupura-II) but was unsuccessful. He received 1,231 votes and lost the seat to Rana Tanveer Hussain.

He contested the 2018 Pakistani general election as a candidate of PML-N from NA-119 (Sheikhupura-I), but was unsuccessful. He received 94,122 votes and was defeated by Rahat Amanullah, a candidate of Pakistan Tehreek-e-Insaf (PTI).

He was elected to the Provincial Assembly of the Punjab as a candidate of PML-N from PP-139 Sheikhupura-IV in an April 2024 by-election. He received 45,679 votes and defeated Ijaz Hussain, a PTI-supported candidate of Sunni Ittehad Council (SIC).

== Death ==
Hussain died from a heart attack on 26 August 2024, at the age of 77. His funeral was held in Muridke and he was buried in Nangal Kaswala, his native village.
