= Ajnianwala =

- Town
- Location within Pakistan Location within Punjab Location within Asia
- Coordinates: 31°56′03.4″N 73°46′28.6″E
- Country: Pakistan
- Province: Punjab
- Division: Lahore
- District: Sheikhupura

Ajnianwala is a town of Sheikhupura District in Punjab, Pakistan. It is 32 kilometres (20 mi) from Sheikhupura on Hafizabad Road.

== History ==
Ajinanwala dates back at least 500 years. Before the partition of Indian subcontinent, the town had a considerable Sikh majority, who upon partition migrated to India. Gurdwara Ajnianwala is still intact but was allocated to migrants from Indian Punjab in 1947 which is now non-functional. This place was built by Surjan Das Khatri and the "Surjan Dasia" sect draws its name from him. Samadhs outside the Gurdwara belong to Surjan Das, Athal Das and two of their disciples. The Granth compiled by Surjan Das is known, as "Ajat Granth". Fare of Smadh used to be held in Chait before partition.

Like many other classic Punjabi towns, a fair (maila) is held in Chait (March 16–18) too where the traditional game of Punjab, kabbadi, is played. This fair is associated with the saint Baba Sadiq Shah Wali, whose tomb is also in Ajnianwala.

== People of Ajnianwala ==
Ajnianwala is multicultural and multiethnic town. The majority of population is local Punjabi-speaking while around 40% people are descendants of migrants from Indian Punjab. Major casts of Ajnianwala include Guru Jatt, Goraya jatt, Walana Jutt, Jutt spall, Khara, Janjua, Shaikh, Araien, Syed, Malik and Rajputs or Ranas, Mayo, Mughal,ManGat,Awan, Khokher, Ansari, Dogar, Sial.

The town is a commercial hub for adjacent rural areas. Two canals, the Qadirabad-Balloki link and Upper Gogera Canals, flow beside the town and irrigate the land.

== Education ==
Ajnianwala serves as education centre of the area where two higher secondary schools and colleges for boys and girls besides two middle schools for boys and girls operate. A number of private schools are also in town.

- Seven Star Model School, Ajnianwala
- The Talent College of science, Ajnianwala.
- Educants Science Academy Ajnianwala, Sheikhupura
- Decent public school, Ajninawala.
- Misaali Grammar school, Ajnianwala.
- Hayat Cambridge school, Ajnianwala.
- The HOPE school system, Ajnianwala.
- M.A Azad Public Model School Ajnianwala.
- EFA school, Ajnianwala.
- Allied school, ajnianwala.
- Dar-e-Arqam school, ajnianwal.
- Wisdom house tuition centre, Ajnianwala.
- Rana Science Academy

== Health ==
The main health centre is Basic Health Unit Ajnianwala, while there are number of private clinics providing health facilities to the general public.

== Public offices ==
There is a police Chowki in the town with pre-partition history. Union Council Ajnianwala serves as a local government institution while the post office has been operating since the British era.
