= Mian Abdul Rauf =

Pakistani politician

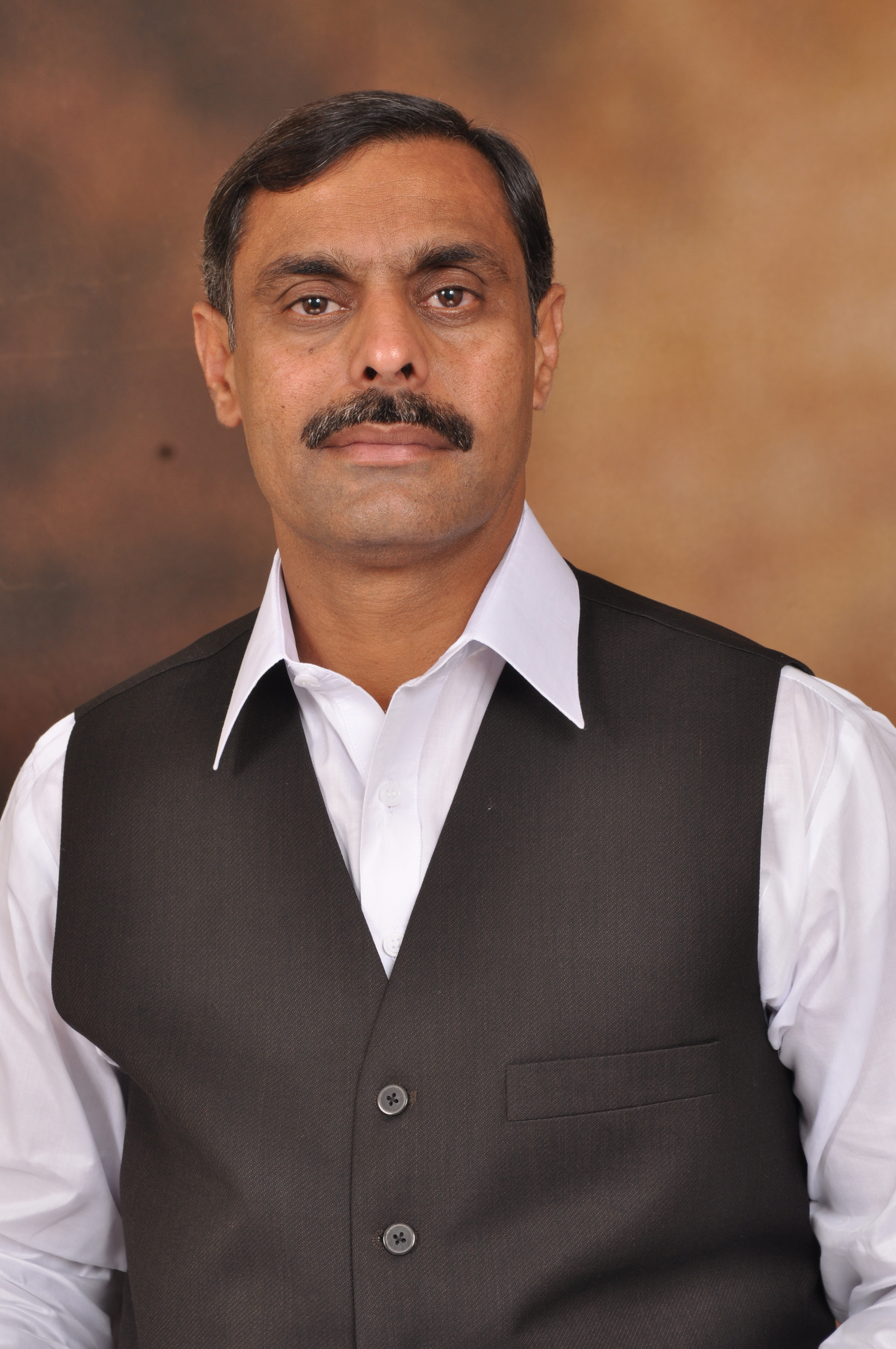

Member of the Provincial Assembly of the Punjab
- In office 15 August 2018 – 14 January 2023
- Constituency: PP-138 Sheikhupura-IV

Personal details
- Party: PMLN

Mian Abdul Rauf is a Pakistani politician who had been a member of the Provincial Assembly of the Punjab from August 2018 till January 2023.

== Political career ==
He was elected to the Provincial Assembly of the Punjab as a candidate of Pakistan Muslim League (N) from Constituency PP-138 (Sheikhupura-IV) in the 2018 Pakistani general election.

In the past he held the office of Nazim of Faizpur twice.
