= Sharaqpur Tehsil =

Sharaqpur Tehsil تحصیل شرقپور
- Tehsil
- Country: Pakistan
- Region: (Punjab, Pakistan) Punjab
- District: Sheikhupura

Population (2017)
  - Tehsil: 197,220
  - Urban: 41,958
  - Rural: 155,262
- Time zone: UTC+5 (PST)
  - Summer (DST): UTC+6 (PDT)

Sharaqpur is an administrative subdivision (Tehsil) located in Sheikhupura District, Punjab, Pakistan. The city of Sharaqpur is the headquarters of tehsil. The population of tehsil is 197,220 according to the 2017 census.

http://www.Sharaqpur.com/

== See also ==
- List of tehsils of Punjab, Pakistan
- Ferozewala Tehsil
- Safdarabad Tehsil
