= Ferozewala =

Ferozewala فِيروزوالا
- City
- Location within Punjab, Pakistan Location within Pakistan
- Coordinates: 31°40′9″N 74°16′26″E
- Country: Pakistan
- Province: Punjab
- Division: Lahore
- District: Sheikhupura

Government
  - Type: Municipal Corporation
  - Mayor: Vacant
  - Municipal Officer: Vacant

Population (2023)
  - City: 177,238
  - Rank: 59th in Pakistan
- Time zone: UTC+5 (PST)

Ferozwala (Punjabi: فِيروزوالا) is a city of Sheikhupura District in the Punjab province of Pakistan. The city serves as the administrative headquarter of Ferozwala Tehsil and is located near the provincial capital Lahore. Situated on the Grand Trunk Road, it is the 59th most populous city of Pakistan.

== Demographics ==
Population

Historical population
Year	Pop.	±% p.a.
1998	55,433	—
2017	141,405	+5.05%
2023	177,238	+3.84%

According to the 2023 census, Ferozewala had a population of 177,238.

Languages

Languages of Ferozwala MC (2023 Census)
1. Punjabi (84.1%)
2. Urdu (9.00%)
3. Pashto (6.00%)
4. Other (0.90%)

== See also ==
- Sheikhupura
- Muridke
- Sharaqpur Sharif
