= Rahat Amanullah =

Pakistani politician

Member of the National Assembly of Pakistan
- In office 13 August 2018 – 25 January 2023
- Constituency: NA-119 (Sheikhupura-I)

Personal details
- Born: Sheikhupura, Punjab, Pakistan
- Party: PTI (2018-present)

Rahat Amanullah Bhatti راحت امان اللہis a Pakistani politician, who had been a member of the National Assembly of Pakistan serving from August 2018 till January 2023. Bhatti secured 110,231 votes defeating Rana Afzaal Hussain of PML-N, who received 94,072 votes in the 2018 elections. Bhatti previously served in Pakistan Army's artillery corps, retiring as a Brigadier in 1989.

== Political career ==
He was elected to the National Assembly of Pakistan from Constituency NA-119 (Sheikhupura-I) as a candidate of Pakistan Tehreek-e-Insaf in the 2018 Pakistani general election.

== More Reading ==
- List of members of the 15th National Assembly of Pakistan
