= Kot Abdul Malik =

Kot Abdul Malik کوٹ عبد المالک
- City
- Location within Punjab, Pakistan Location within Pakistan
- Coordinates: 31.62384°N 74.23702°E
- Country: Pakistan
- Province: (Punjab, Pakistan) Punjab
- Division: Lahore
- District: Sheikhupura

Government
  - Type: Municipal Corporation
  - Mayor: Vacant
  - Deputy Mayor: Vacant

Population (2023)
  - City: 162,030
  - Rank: 68th in Pakistan
- Time zone: UTC+5 (PST)

Kot Abdul Malik (Punjabi: کوٹ عبد المالک) is a city in Sheikhupura District, Punjab, Pakistan located near the M-2 motorway. It is the 68th most populous city in Pakistan. Kot Abdul Malik is part of Ferozewala Tehsil of Sheikhupura District.

The city is situated on the Lahore-Sheikhupura Road.

== Demographics ==
Population

Historical population
Year	Pop.	±% p.a.
1998	63,525	—
2017	143,434	+4.38%
2023	162,030	+2.05%

According to the 2023 census, Kot Abdul Malik had a population of 162,030.

Languages

Languages of Kot Abdul Malik MC (2023 Census)
1. Punjabi (90.5%)
2. Urdu (7.50%)
3. Pashto (1.50%)
4. Others (0.50%)
