= Sharaqpur =

Sharaqpur Sharif
- Town
- Interactive map of Sharaqpur Sharif
- Coordinates: 31°27′48″N 74°6′0″E
- Country: Pakistan
- Province: Punjab
- District: Sheikhupura

Population (2023 Census)
  - Total: 48,019

Sharaqpur Sharif is a historic town of Sheikhupura District in the Punjab province of Pakistan. The town is the tehsil headquarters of Sharaqpur Tehsil of Sheikhupura District. It is located close to Lahore on the eastern bank of the Ravi River.
