= Rana Tanveer Hussain =

Pakistani politician (born 1949)

- رانا تنویر حسین

Minister of Industries and Production
- Incumbent
- Assumed office 11 March 2024
- President: Asif Ali Zardari
- Prime Minister: Shehbaz Sharif

Ministry of National Food Security & Research
- Incumbent
- Assumed office 3 April 2024
- President: Asif Ali Zardari
- Prime Minister: Shehbaz Sharif

Ministry of Federal Education and Professional Training
- In office 19 April 2022 – 10 August 2023
- President: Arif Alvi
- Prime Minister: Shehbaz Sharif
- Preceded by: Shafqat Mahmood
- Succeeded by: Madad Ali Sindhi (caretaker)

Ministry of Science and Technology (Pakistan)
- In office 24 November 2017 – 31 May 2018
- President: Mamnoon Hussain
- Prime Minister: Shahid Khaqan Abbasi
- In office 17 December 2014 – 28 July 2017
- President: Mamnoon Hussain
- Prime Minister: Nawaz Sharif
- Preceded by: Bahadur Khan

Ministry of Defence (Pakistan)
- In office 7 June 2013 – 28 July 2017
- President: Mamnoon Hussain
- Prime Minister: Nawaz Sharif
- In office 31 March 2008 – 13 May 2008
- Prime Minister: Yusuf Raza Gillani

Member of the National Assembly of Pakistan
- Incumbent
- Assumed office 29 February 2024
- Constituency: NA-114 Sheikhupura-II
- In office 17 November 2002 – 10 August 2023
- Constituency: NA-114 Sheikhupura-II
- In office 11 June 1990 – 12 October 1999
- Constituency: NA-114 Sheikhupura-II
- In office 21 October 1985 – 31 December 1990
- Constituency: NA-114 Sheikhupura-II

Personal details
- Born: 1 October 1949 (age 77) Sheikhupura, Punjab, Pakistan
- Party: PMLN (1993-present)
- Relatives: Rana Afzaal Hussain (brother); Rana Ahmed Ateeq Anwar (nephew); Rana Tahir Iqbal (son-in-law)
- Education: Punjab University (BA and MA)

Rana Tanveer Hussain (Urdu: رانا تنوير حسين; born 1 October 1949) is a Pakistani politician who is current serving as Minister for National Food Security and Research and also serving as Minister of Industries and Production since 11 March 2024 and serving as Member of the National Assembly of Pakistan since 29 February 2024. He has been a member of the National Assembly of Pakistan since February 2024. He was a member of the National Assembly between 1985 and August 2023.

He is serving as Federal Minister for Industries and Production and National Food Security and Research since March 2024.

He served as Minister for Defence Production and Minister for Science and Technology, in Abbasi cabinet from 2017 to 2018. He served as the Minister for Defence Production and the Minister for Science and Technology in the Third Sharif ministry. A leader of the Pakistan Muslim League (N), Hussain briefly held the cabinet portfolio of Minister for Defence Production during the Gillani ministry in 2008.

He has served as Parliamentary Secretary to Ministry of Finance, Special Assistant to the Prime Minister on Finance from 1997 to 1999 as well Parliamentary Secretary to the Prime Minister.

== Early life and education ==
He was born into a Punjabi Rajput family on 1 October 1949 in Sheikhupura, Punjab.

He is brother of Rana Afzaal Hussain as well the late Rai Mansab Ali Khan and his daughter Shizra Mansab Ali Khan, both involved in the local politics of Nankana Sahib.

He holds degree of M.A. in Economics and LLB from the Punjab University, Lahore.

== Political career ==
Hussain started his political career in 1983 when he became district member of the council in Sheikhupura. He was elected as member of the National Assembly of Pakistan for the first time in 1985 Pakistani general election as an independent candidate. He later joined Pakistan Muslim League. In the 1990 Pakistani general elections, he was re-elected as member of the National Assembly for the second time.

In the 1993 Pakistani general elections, he lost the seat of the National Assembly. In 1997 Pakistani general elections, he was re-elected as the member of the National Assembly for the third time. From 1997 to 1999, he served as Special Assistant to then Prime Minister of Pakistan Nawaz Sharif on Finance.

In the 2008 Pakistani general elections, he was re-elected as the member of the National Assembly for the fourth time from two constituencies NA-131 and NA-132. He vacated NA-131 seat to retain NA-132.

In the 2013 Pakistani general elections, he was re-elected as the member of the National Assembly for the fifth time. In June 2013, he was appointed the Minister for Defence Production. Later he was given the additional portfolio of Minister for Science and Technology.

He had ceased to hold ministerial office in July 2017 when the federal cabinet was disbanded following the disqualification of Prime Minister Nawaz Sharif after Panama Papers case decision. Following the election of Shahid Khaqan Abbasi as Prime Minister of Pakistan in August 2017, he was inducted into the federal cabinet of Abbasi. He was appointed federal minister for Defence Production for third time. In November 2017, he was given the additional cabinet portfolio of Minister for Science and Technology after which Minister of State for Science and Technology, Mir Dostain Khan Domki stepped down in protest. On 3 May 2018, in a cabinet reshuffle, he ceased to hold the office as Federal Minister for Defence Production after Usman Ibrahim succeeded him. Upon the dissolution of the National Assembly on the expiration of its term on 31 May 2018, Hussain ceased to hold the office as Federal Minister for Science and Technology.

He was re-elected to the National Assembly as a candidate of PML-N from Constituency NA-120 (Sheikhupura-II) in the 2018 Pakistani general election.

He was re-elected to the National Assembly as a candidate of PML-N from NA-114 Sheikhupura-II in the 2024 Pakistani general election.

Political offices
Preceded by	Minister for Defence Production; 2008–2008	Succeeded by
Preceded by	Minister for Defence Production; 2013	Incumbent
Preceded by	Minister for Science and Technology; 2014–2017	Incumbent
