= Ferozewala Tehsil =

Ferozewala Tehsil تحصیل فیروزوالہ تحصيل فِيروزوالا
- Tehsil
- Country: Pakistan
- Region: (Punjab, Pakistan) Punjab
- Division: Lahore
- District: Sheikhpura
- Capital: Ferozwala
- Union councils: 50

Population (2017)
  - Tehsil: 795,498
  - Urban: 284,839
  - Rural: 510,659
- Time zone: UTC+5 (PST)
  - Summer (DST): UTC+6 (PDT)

Ferozwala Tehsil (Urdu: تحصیل فیروزوالہ, Punjabi: تحصِيل فِيروزوالا), is an administrative subdivision (tehsil) of Sheikhupura District, Punjab, Pakistan. The city of Ferozwala serves as the tehsil's administrative headquarter.
