= Sheikhupura Tehsil =

Shaikhupura Tehsil تحصيل شیخوپورا تحصيل شیخوپورہ
- Tehsil
- Country: Pakistan
- Region: Punjab
- District: Shaikhupur District
- Capital: Shaikhupur
- Towns: 1
- Union councils: 51

Government
  - Assistant Commissioner: Dr. Farvah Aamir
- Time zone: UTC+5 (PST)
  - Summer (DST): UTC+5 (PST)
- Postal code: 39350
- Area code: 056

Shaikhupur Tehsil (Urdu: تحصِيل شَيخُوپُور), is an administrative subdivision (tehsil) of Shaikhupur District in the Punjab province of Pakistan. The city of Shaikhupur is the headquarters of the tehsil.
