= Sheikhupura District =

Coordinates: 31°43′12″N 73°58′48″E

Sheikhupura District ضلع شیخوپورا ضلع شیخوپورہ
- District of Punjab
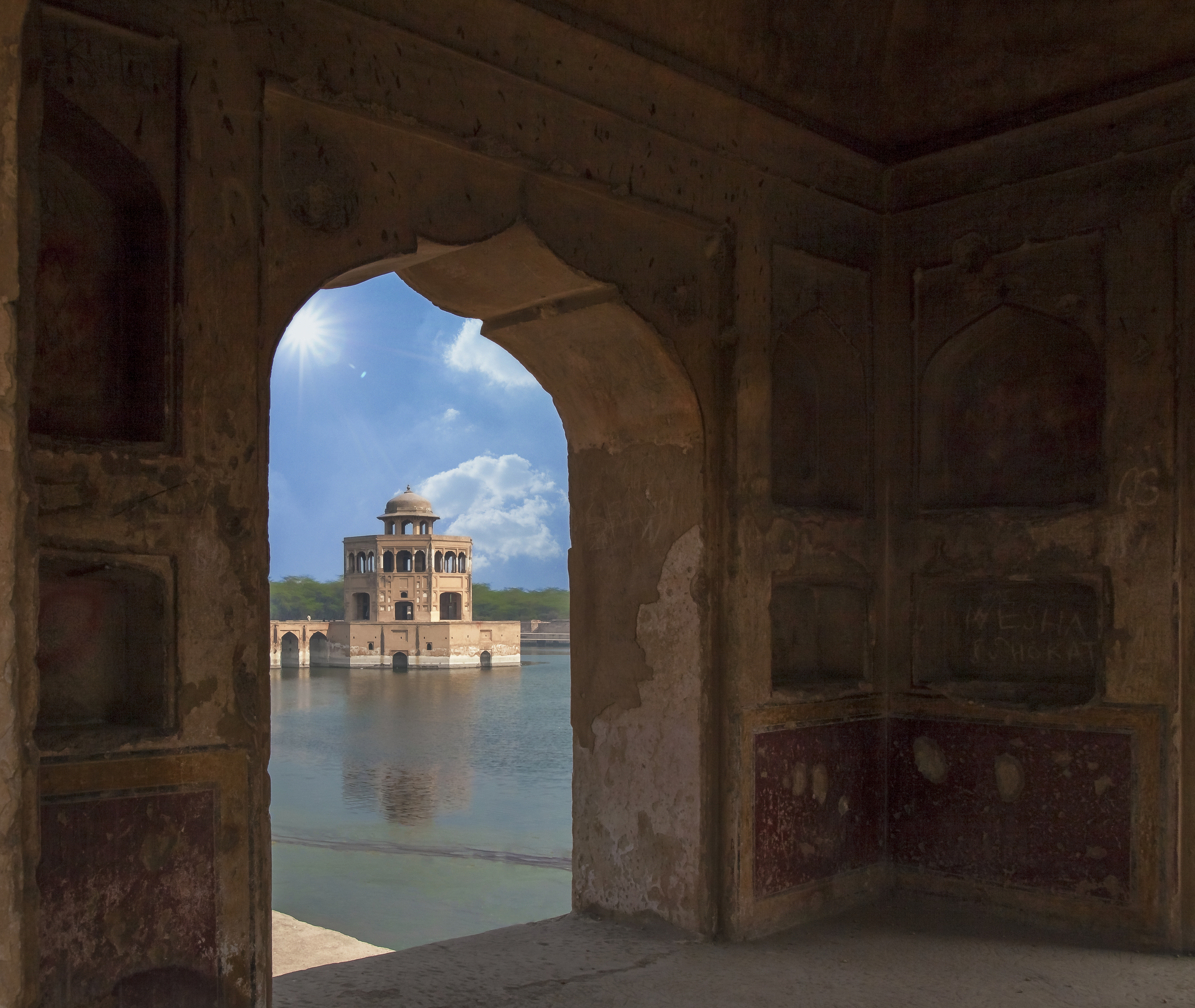
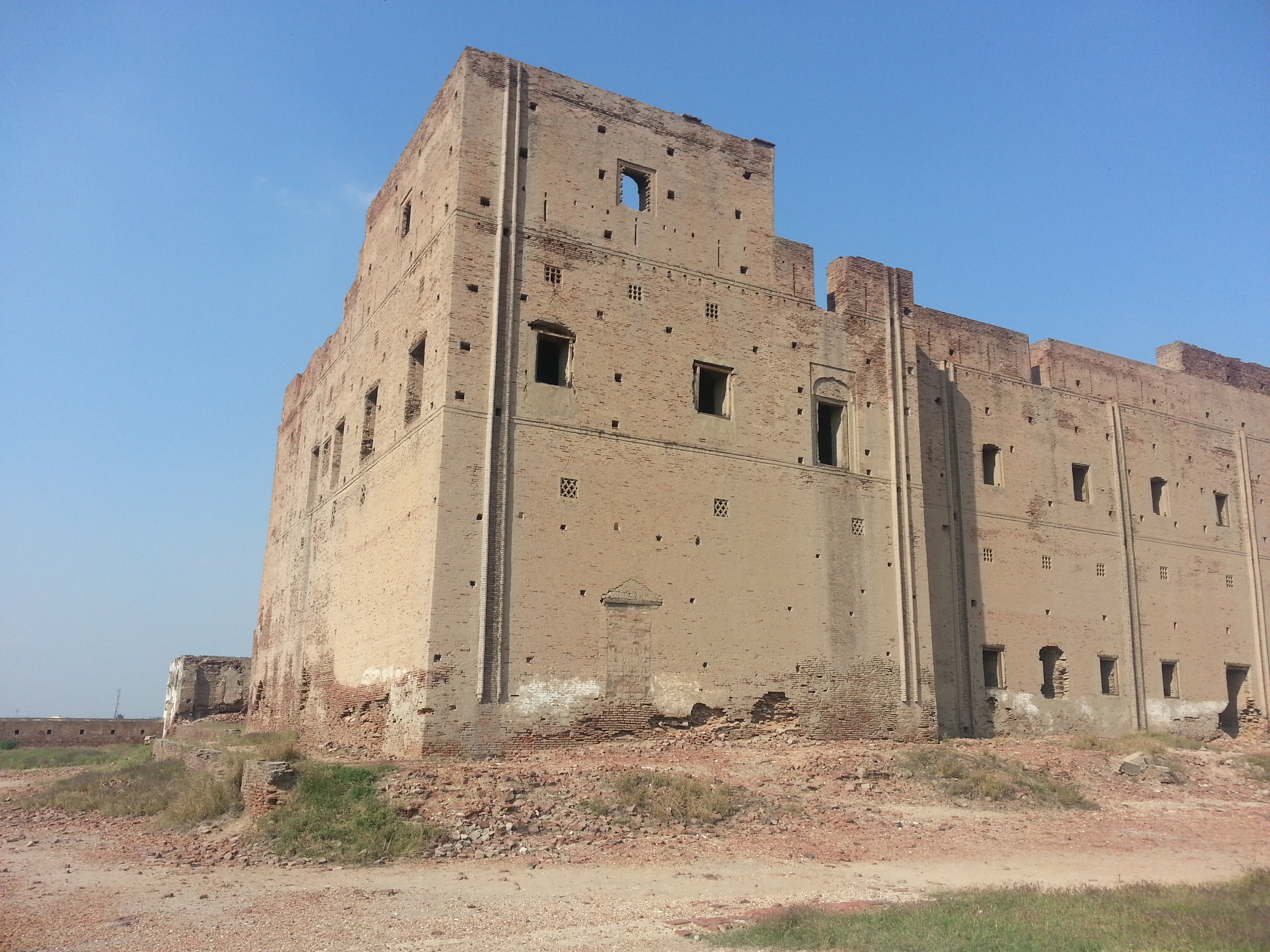
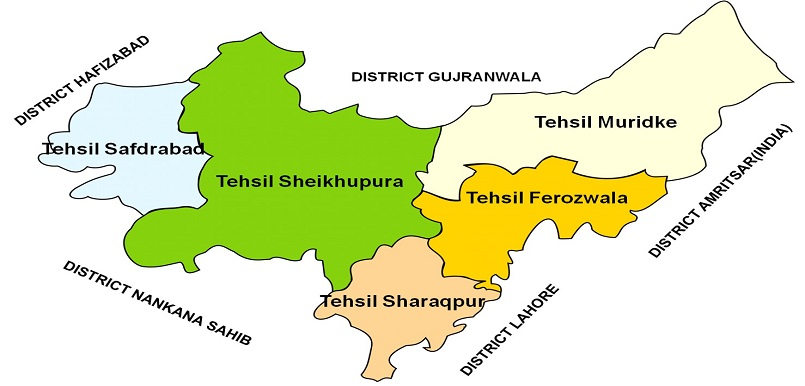
- Top: Hiran Minar; Bottom: Havelis in Sheikhupura Fort

- Map of Sheikhupura District highlighted
- Country: Pakistan
- Province: Punjab
- Division: Lahore
- Established: 1922
- Headquarters: Sheikhupura

Government
  - Type: District Administration
  - Deputy Commissioner: Mr. Shahid Imran Marth
  - District Police Officer: N/A
  - District Health Officer: N/A

Area
  - District of Punjab: 3,744 km^{2} (1,446 sq mi)

Population (2023)
  - District of Punjab: 4,049,418
  - Density: 1,082/km^{2} (2,801/sq mi)
  - Urban: 1,550,793
  - Rural: 2,498,625

Literacy
  - Literacy rate: Total: (68.88%); Male: (72.09%); Female: (65.46%)
- Time zone: UTC+5 (PST)
- Area code: 056
- Tehsils: Sheikhupura; Ferozewala; Muridke; Sharaq Pur; Safdarabad

Sheikhupura District (Note: Punjabi: ضلع شیخوپورا; Urdu: ضلع شيخوپورہ) is a district within the Lahore Division of Punjab, Pakistan. Sheikhupura is the headquarters of the district. According to the 1998 census of Pakistan, the district had a population of 3,321,029 of which 25.45% were urban. In 2005 one of its subdivisions was split off to form the new Nankana Sahib District.

According to the 2017 Census of Pakistan, most populous cities of the district are Sheikhupura, Muridke, Kot Abdul Malik and Ferozewala. All these four cities are listed in the List of most populous cities in Pakistan.

== Administration ==
The district comprises five tehsils:

Tehsil	Area (km^{2})	Pop. (2023)	Density (ppl/km^{2}) (2023)	Literacy rate (2023)	Union Councils
Muridke	1,028	721,192	701.55	69.10%	...
Ferozewala	511	997,246	1,951.56	66.55%	...
Safdarabad	461	320,851	695.99	67.55 %	...
Sheikhupura	1,369	1,780,837	1,300.83	70.72%	...
Sharak Pur	375	229,292	611.45	65.05%	...

=== Committees ===
List of Municipal Committees in District Sheikhupura

1. Sheikhupura Municipal Committee
2. Farooq abad Municipal Committee
3. Mananwala Municipal Committee
4. Safdar abad Municipal Committee
5. Khanqah dogran Municipal Committee
6. Ferozwala Municipal Committee
7. Kot Abdulmalik Municipal Committee
8. Muridke Municipal Committee
9. Narang Mandi Municipal Committee
10. Sharaqpur Municipal Committee

== Demographics ==
=== Population ===
Historical population
Year	Pop.	±% p.a.
1998	2,276,164	—
2017	3,460,004	+2.23%
2023	4,049,418	+2.66%

As of the 2023 census, Sheikhupura district has 593,260 households and a population of 4,049,418. The district has a sex ratio of 105.58 males to 100 females and a literacy rate of 68.88%: 72.09% for males and 65.46% for females. 1,087,191 (26.85% of the surveyed population) are under 10 years of age. 1,550,793 (38.30%) live in urban areas.

=== Religion ===
Religion in Sheikhupura district (2023)
Religion	Percent
Islam	96.23%
Christianity	3.67%
Other	0.1%

Religion in contemporary Sheikhupura District
Religious group	1941		2017		2023	
Religious group	Pop.	%	Pop.	%	Pop.	%
Islam	326,042	60.54%	3,325,148	96.30%	3,896,801	96.23%
Sikhism	109,276	20.29%	—N/a	—N/a	85	~0%
Hinduism	56,378	10.47%	323	0.01%	820	0.02%
Christianity	46,737	8.68%	130,405	3.77%	148,784	3.67%
Ahmadiyya	—N/a	—N/a	3,656	0.11%	2,638	0.07%
Others	151	0.02%	472	0.01%	334	0.01%
Total Population	538,584	100%	3,460,004	100%	4,049,377	100%
Note: 1941 census data is for Shahdara and part of Sheikupura tehsils of erstwhile Sheikhupura district, which roughly corresponds to contemporary Sheikhupura district. Current ratio of population of Sangla Hill and Shahkot tehsils (which were split from Sheikhupura tehsil) to current borders of erstwhile Sheikhupura tehsil were used to estimate 1941 population of rural areas currently in Nankana Sahib district. Sangla Hill town was removed separately and rural areas were assumed to have a uniform distribution of religions. District and tehsil borders have changed since 1941.

Religious groups in Sheikhupura District (British Punjab province era)
Religious group	1921		1931		1941	
Religious group	Pop.	%	Pop.	%	Pop.	%
Islam	330,880	63.25%	445,996	64.01%	542,344	63.62%
Hinduism (Note: 1931-1941: Including Ad-Dharmis)	85,781	16.4%	81,887	11.75%	89,182	10.46%
Sikhism	82,965	15.86%	119,477	17.15%	160,706	18.85%
Christianity	23,431	4.48%	49,266	7.07%	60,054	7.04%
Jainism	78	0.01%	100	0.01%	221	0.03%
Zoroastrianism	0	0%	6	0%	1	0%
Judaism	0	0%	0	0%	0	0%
Buddhism	0	0%	0	0%	0	0%
Others	0	0%	0	0%	0	0%
Total population	523,135	100%	696,732	100%	852,508	100%
Note1: British Punjab province era district borders are not an exact match in the present-day due to various bifurcations to district borders — which since created new districts — throughout the historic Punjab Province region during the post-independence era that have taken into account population increases. Note2:District created between Gujranwala District, Sialkot District, Amritsar District, Lahore District, Montgomery District, and Lyallpur District in 1920 to account for the large population increase in the region, primarily due to the Chenab Canal Colony.

Religion in the Tehsils of Sheikhupura District (1921)
Tehsil	Islam		Hinduism		Sikhism		Christianity		Jainism		Others (Note: Including Buddhism, Zoroastrianism, Judaism, Tribals, others, or not stated)		Total	
Tehsil	Pop.	%	Pop.	%	Pop.	%	Pop.	%	Pop.	%	Pop.	%	Pop.	%
Khangah Dogran Tehsil	149,478	55.84%	47,291	17.67%	52,581	19.64%	18,262	6.82%	62	0.02%	0	0%	267,674	100%
Sharakpur Tehsil	181,402	71.01%	38,490	15.07%	30,384	11.89%	5,169	2.02%	16	0.01%	0	0%	255,461	100%
Note: British Punjab province era tehsil borders are not an exact match in the present-day due to various bifurcations to tehsil borders — which since created new tehsils — throughout the historic Punjab Province region during the post-independence era that have taken into account population increases.

Religion in the Tehsils of Sheikhupura District (1941)
Tehsil	Islam		Hinduism		Sikhism		Christianity		Jainism		Others (Note: Including Anglo-Indian Christians, British Christians, Buddhism, Zoroastrianism, Judaism, Tribals, others, or not stated)		Total	
Tehsil	Pop.	%	Pop.	%	Pop.	%	Pop.	%	Pop.	%	Pop.	%	Pop.	%
Sheikhupura Tehsil	201,401	53.48%	45,690	12.13%	94,882	25.2%	34,359	9.12%	211	0.06%	46	0.01%	376,589	100%
Nankana Sahib Tehsil	174,787	74.33%	22,631	9.62%	31,562	13.42%	6,157	2.62%	8	0%	0	0%	235,145	100%
Shahdara Tehsil	166,156	69.01%	20,861	8.66%	34,262	14.23%	19,469	8.09%	2	0%	24	0.01%	240,774	100%
Note1: British Punjab province era tehsil borders are not an exact match in the present-day due to various bifurcations to tehsil borders — which since created new tehsils — throughout the historic Punjab Province region during the post-independence era that have taken into account population increases. Note2: Tehsil religious breakdown figures for Christianity only includes local Christians, labeled as "Indian Christians" on census. Does not include Anglo-Indian Christians or British Christians, who were classified under "Other" category.

=== Language ===
Languages of Sheikhupura district (2023)
1. Punjabi (93.4%)
2. Urdu (4.89%)
3. Pashto (0.95%)
4. Others (0.76%)

At the time of the 2023 census, 93.40% of the population spoke Punjabi, 4.89% Urdu and 0.95% Pashto as their first language. The Majhi dialect is the predominant dialect here. In 1998, 98.1% of the population spoke Punjabi.

== Notable people ==
- Dhani Ram Chatrik, an influential Punjabi poet
- Ganga Ram, civil engineer and architect
- Kulwant Singh Virk, an author in Punjabi and English language
- Usman Khan, Pakistani International Cricketer

== See also ==
- Sharaqpur Sharif
- Hiran Minar
- Sheikhupura Fort
- Tehsils of Punjab, Pakistan
- Tehsils of Pakistan
- Districts of Pakistan
