= Sheikhpur =

Sheikhpur or Shaikhpur may refer to:

- Sheikhpur, Ballia, a village in UP, India
- Shaikhpur, Handaur, Pratapgarh another village in UP, India

== See also ==
- Sheikhpura, a city in Bihar, India
- Sheikhupura (disambiguation), a city in Pakistan
