= Sheikhupura (disambiguation) =

Sheikhupura is a city in Punjab, Pakistan.

Sheikhupura may also refer to:

- Sheikhupura District, a district of Punjab (Pakistan)
- Sheikhupura Tehsil, a tehsil of district Sheikhupura
- Sheikhupura Fort, a Mughal-era fort
- Sheikhupura cricket team, a cricket team

== See also ==
- Sheikhpura, a city in Bihar, India
- Sheikhpur (disambiguation), several villages
