= Hiran Minar =

Mughal era complex, located in Pakistan

- ہرن مینار
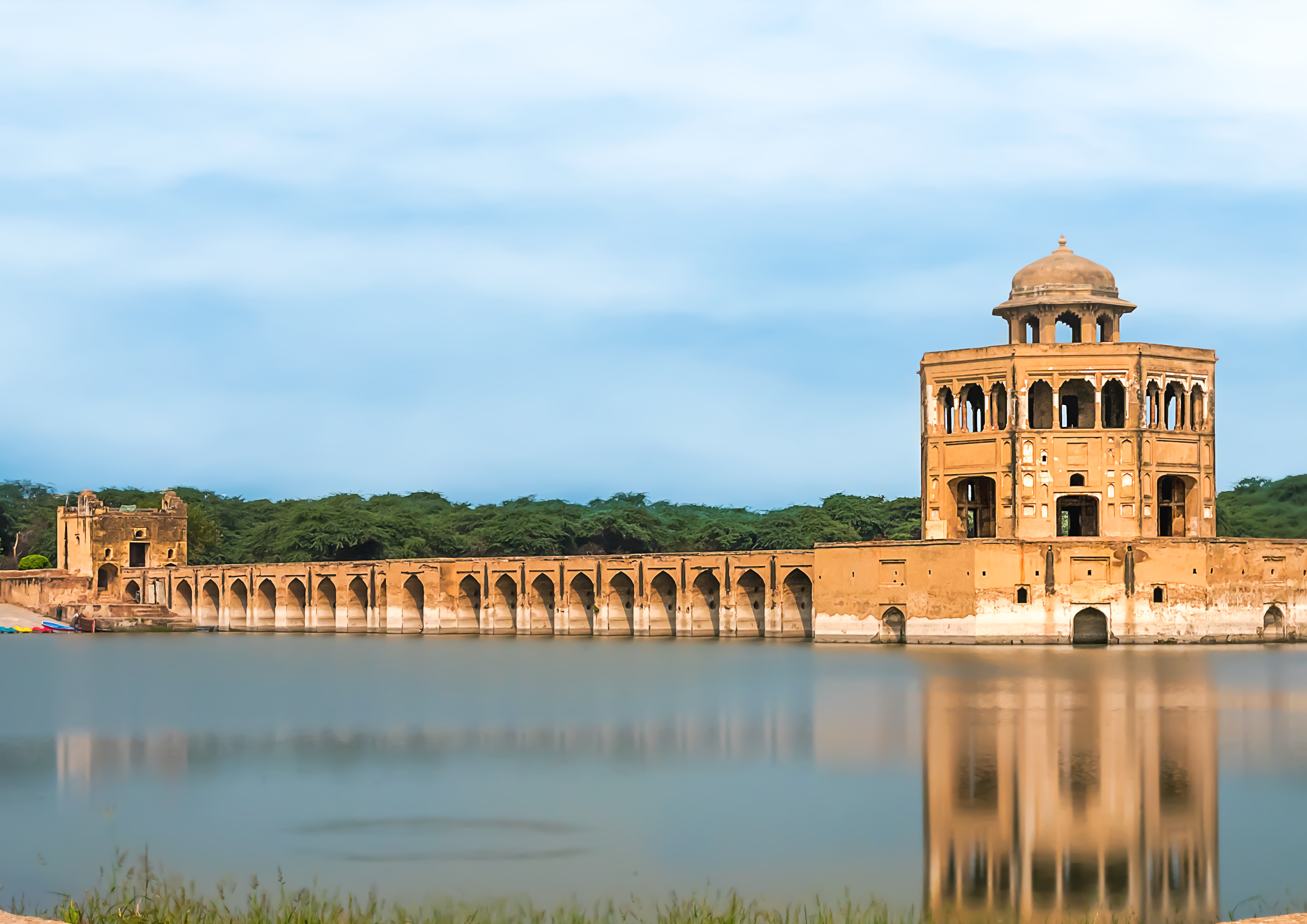
- Hiran Minar complex
- Interactive map of Hiran Minar
- Location: Sheikhupura, Punjab, Pakistan
- Coordinates: 31°44′35″N 73°57′18.7″E
- Beginning date: 1607
- Completion date: 1620

Hiran Minar (Urdu: ہرن مینار; lit. 'The Deer Tower') is an early 17th-century Mughal-era complex in Sheikhupura, in the Pakistani province of Punjab. It was built at the site of a game reserve in memory of Mughal Emperor Jahangir's beloved pet antelope, Mansraj (lit. 'Light of Mind'). The emperor is remembered for his fondness of nature, and the complex embodies the Mughal relationship between humans, pets and hunting.

The landmark was proclaimed protected under the Ancient Monuments Reservation Act, 1904 (Antiquities Act, 1975) in 1916. The Hiran Minar and Tank Sheikhupura are also on the Provisional List of UNESCO World Heritage.

== Location ==
The Hiran Minar is located in the city of Sheikhupura, about 40 kilometers northwest of Lahore, near the Sheikhupura Fort, which also dates from the early 17th century. Both sites are accessible from Lahore via the M2 Motorway, which connects Lahore to Islamabad.

== History ==
Hiran Minar was built during the reign of the Mughal Emperor Jahangir in a hunting reserve used by the Mughal royals. The reserve was built in a scrub forest, and allowed Mughal emperors to experience a sense of semi-wilderness near the imperial city of Lahore. The wild-reserve was used as a park where the royals could hunt for sport.

The minaret itself was built in 1606 C.E. as a monument to Emperor Jahangir's beloved pet antelope, Mansiraj ("lord of all animal beings"). The practice of building such tomb-markers over the skulls of game animals is an ancient Persian custom.

Emperor Jahangir like all Mughal rulers loved to hunt animals like antelope. Oddly enough Jahangir also had a special bond with an antelope he called Hansraj. Tragedy struck during one of his hunting exhibitions with some friends when he mistakenly killed his beloved antelope. Heartbroken by the loss, Jahangir constructed this 100 ft tall Hiran Minar to honor his pet antelope.

== Layout ==
The complex consists of a Jahangir-era minaret next to a larger Shah Jahan-era complex.

=== Minaret ===
The Jahangir-era minaret stands 30 meters tall, and was built in 1606 C.E. as a tomb marker for the emperor's pet antelope, Mansraj. The sides of the minar are inscribed with a eulogy to the antelope. The tower itself is circular and tapers at the top, which is flat, with a parapet wall. There are a total of 210 square holes on the outer surface of the minar, arranged at regular intervals (a total of 14 rows). A spiral staircase with 108 steps lines the inside of the minar (tower). Besides the staircase, there are 11 ascending rectangular arched openings provided for air and light. The minar is divided into six tiers of different heights. The base of each tier has projected molding and the lowest tire has an arched entrance opening . The exterior and interior of the tower have lime plaster, with some floral or lineal fresco paintings. The thick lime plaster applied over the surface of the lowest tier has been divided into decorative panels or arched niches and horizontal bands in high relief.

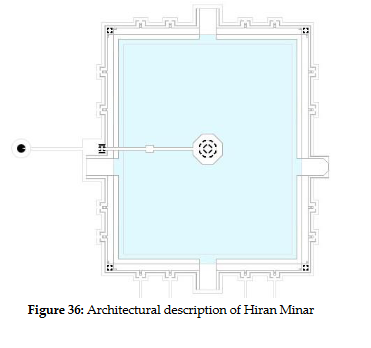
architectural description of the Hiran Minar

=== Pool ===
A massive rectangular water-tank pool measuring 229 meters by 273 meters lies at the heart of the complex. At the center of each side of the tank, a brick ramp slopes down to the water, providing access for wild game that was sought by hunters.

=== Pavilion ===
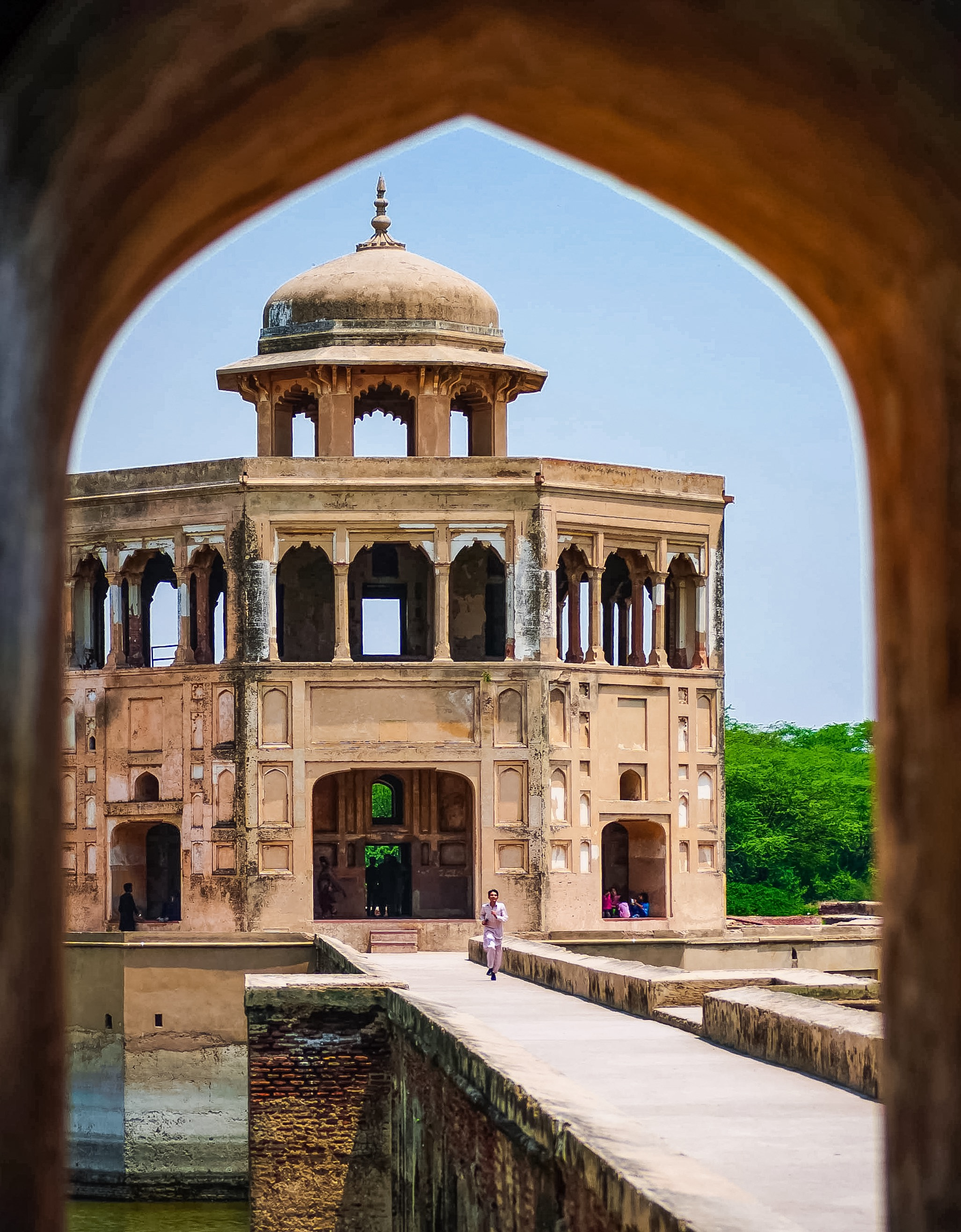
The two-storey pavilion is topped by stone chhatri.

Facing the grand minar on the east side is a big tank with a causeway leading to the octagonal Pavilion built in the middle There is a square pavilion at each corner with a gateway to the baradari. The tank is rectangular in shape, each side has a ramp and a parapet wall and is flanked by four staircases of 8 6 steps. During the Mughal days, a channel was cut from the Aik rivulet and connected with the tank at its north-west corner; in addition, an elaborate system for filling up the tank with rain water from the catchment area was devised. The main gateway to the baradari is a rectangular vestibule with a pointed arch flanked by four other similar but smaller openings, built one upon the other. Inside the vestibule are two platforms. The inner walls have been decorated with recessed niches, while the soffit of the dome shaped ceilings has honeycomb decoration. The two flights of 13 stops constructed at both the corners lead to the roof. The outer and inner surface has been plastered in the usual way and decorated with fresco paintings.

An octagonal pavilion built during the reign of Shah Jahan is at the center of the pool. It is two-stored, and topped by a rooftop chhatri that served as a stone gazebo. Its architecture is similar to the Sher Mandal at Delhi's Purana Qila built by Emperor Humayun.

The pavilion was surrounded not only by the water tank, but also semi-wilderness, and was thus likely used for recreational purposes.

=== Causeway ===
A causeway spans the pool to connect the minaret with the pavilion along an axis which passes through a gateway.

A causeway, standing on 21 pointed arched pillars, connects the main baradari with the gateway.A square-shaped projected platform has been provided in the middle of the causeway.In the center of the tank has been erected an octagonal platform with a low parapet wall on all sides. Over the platform stands the beautiful baradari in the same plan, The baradari was constructed under the orders of the Emperor Jahangir in 1620 A.D. for use as a royal residence.

== Hydraulics ==
The complex has a distinctive water collection system. At each corner of the tank is a small square building and a subsurface water collection system which supplied the water tank; only one of these water systems is extensively exposed today.

== Gallery ==
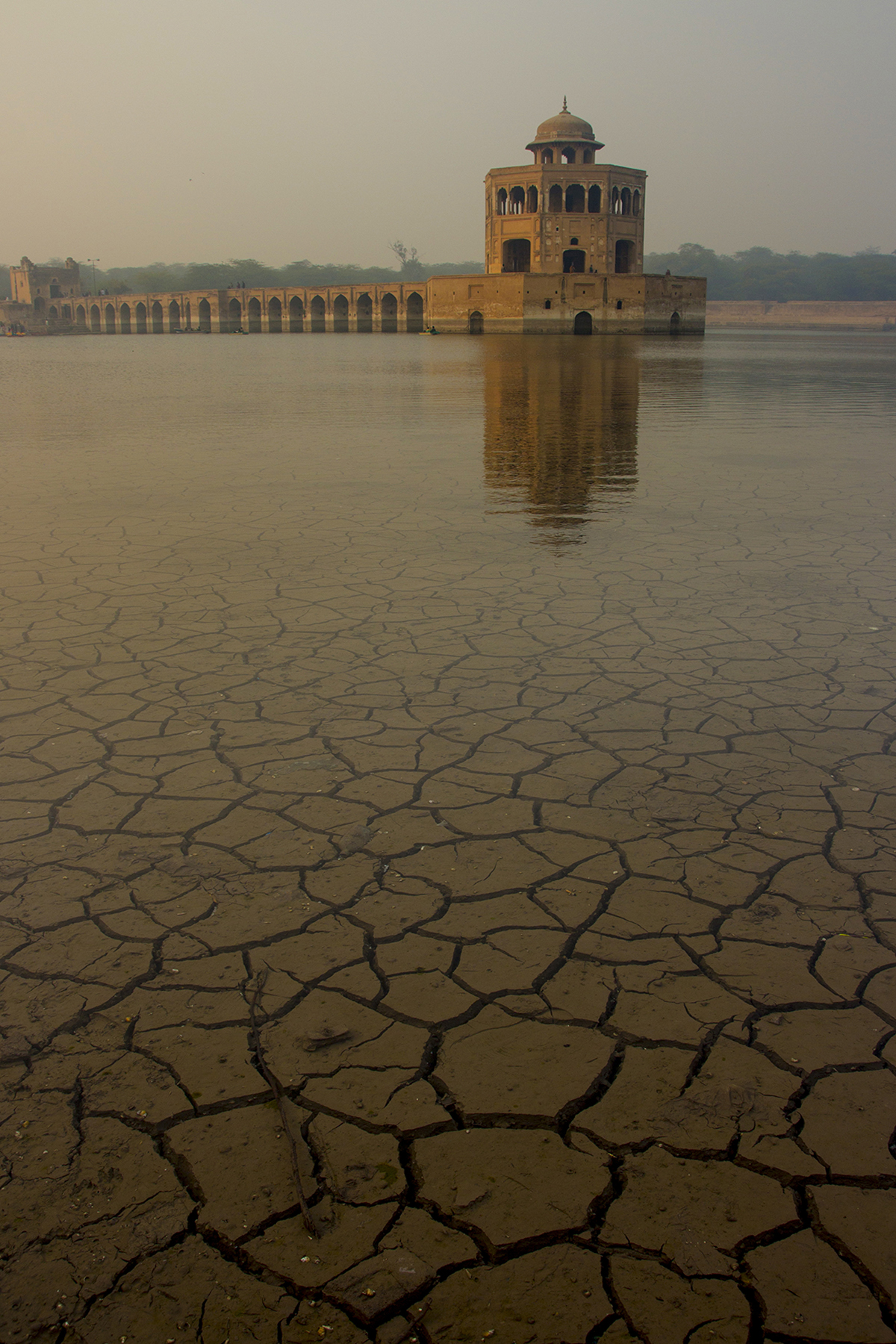

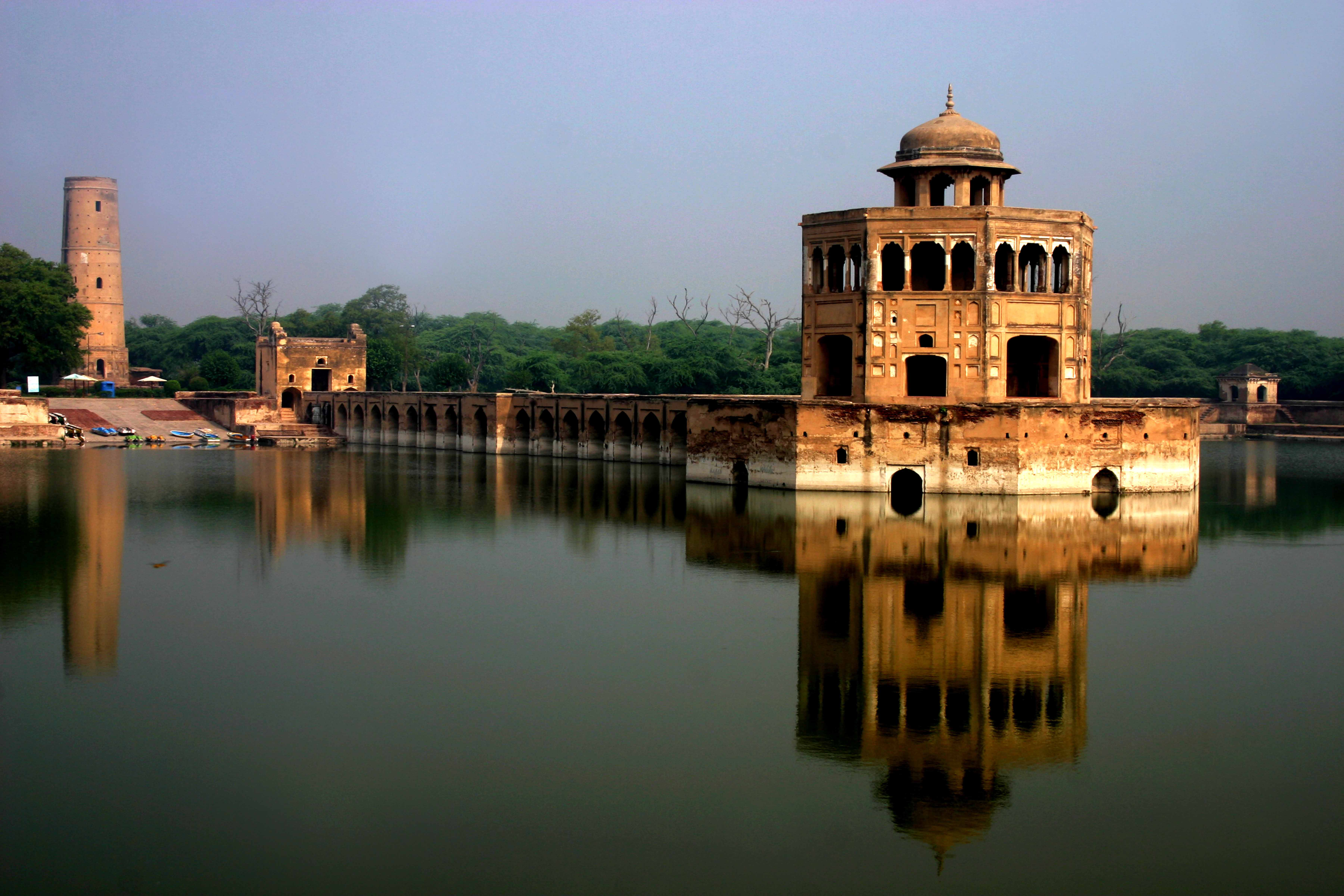

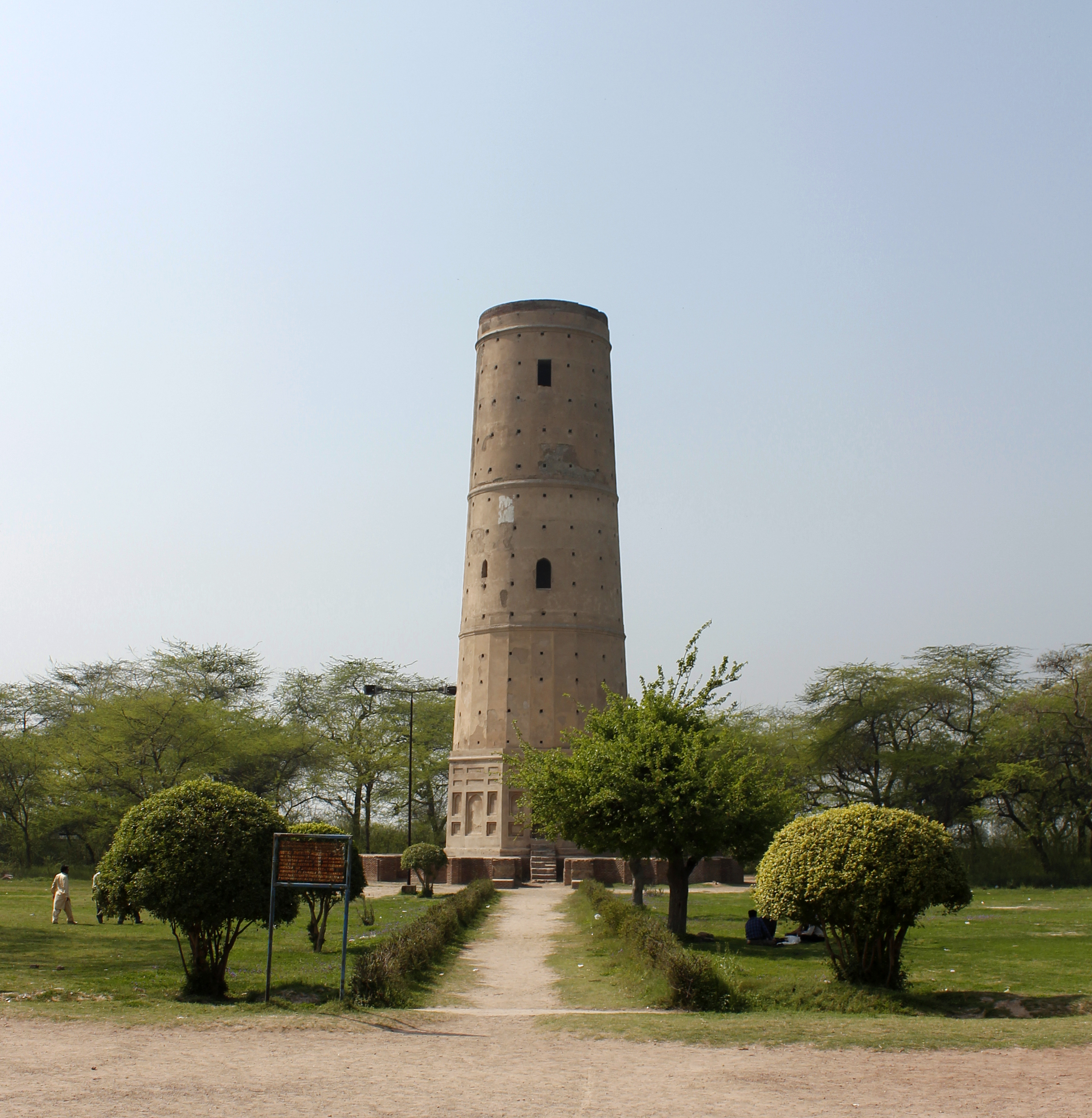
The minaret which marks the tomb of Emperor Jahangir's pet antelope

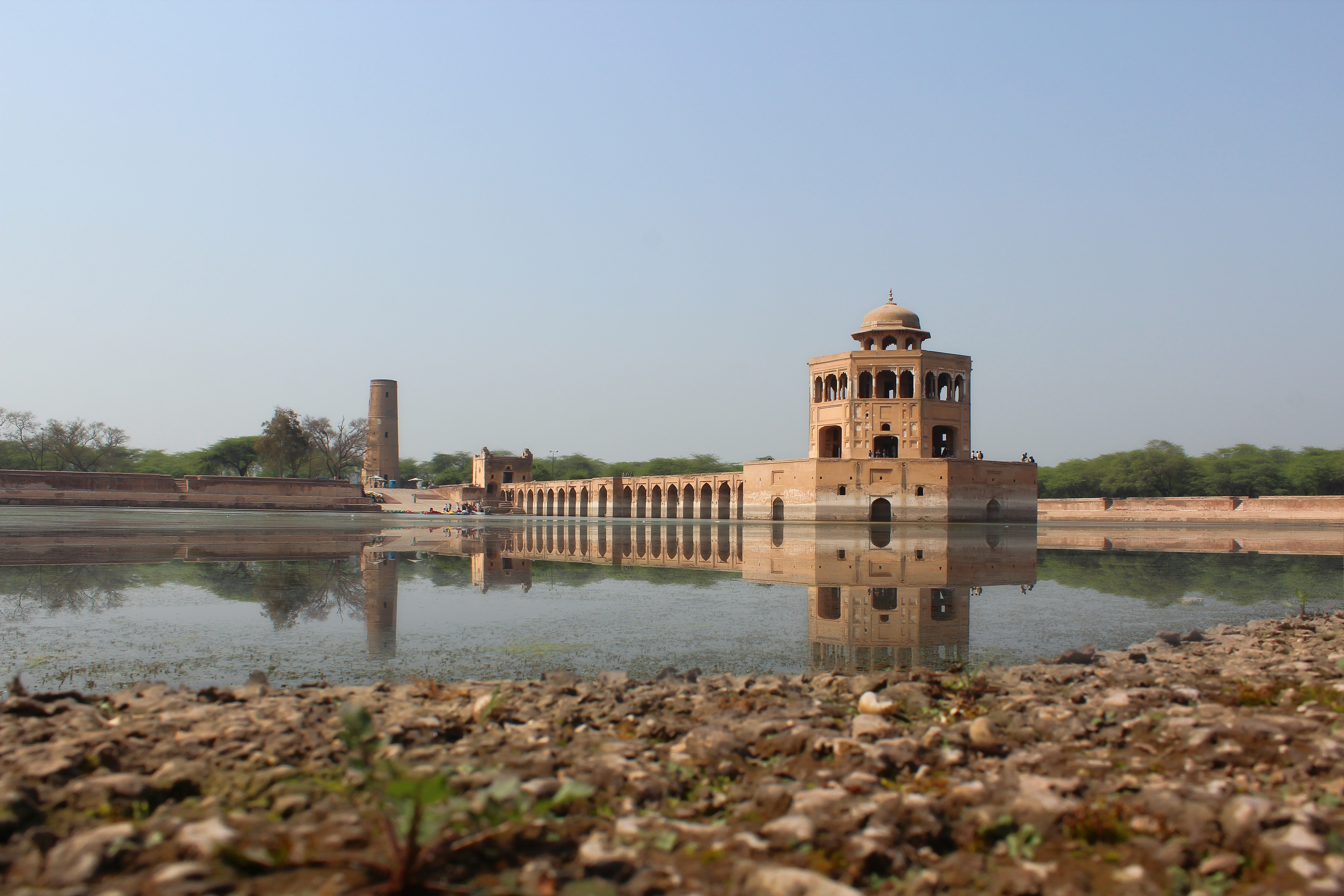
Hiran Minar, Water Tank, Pavilion

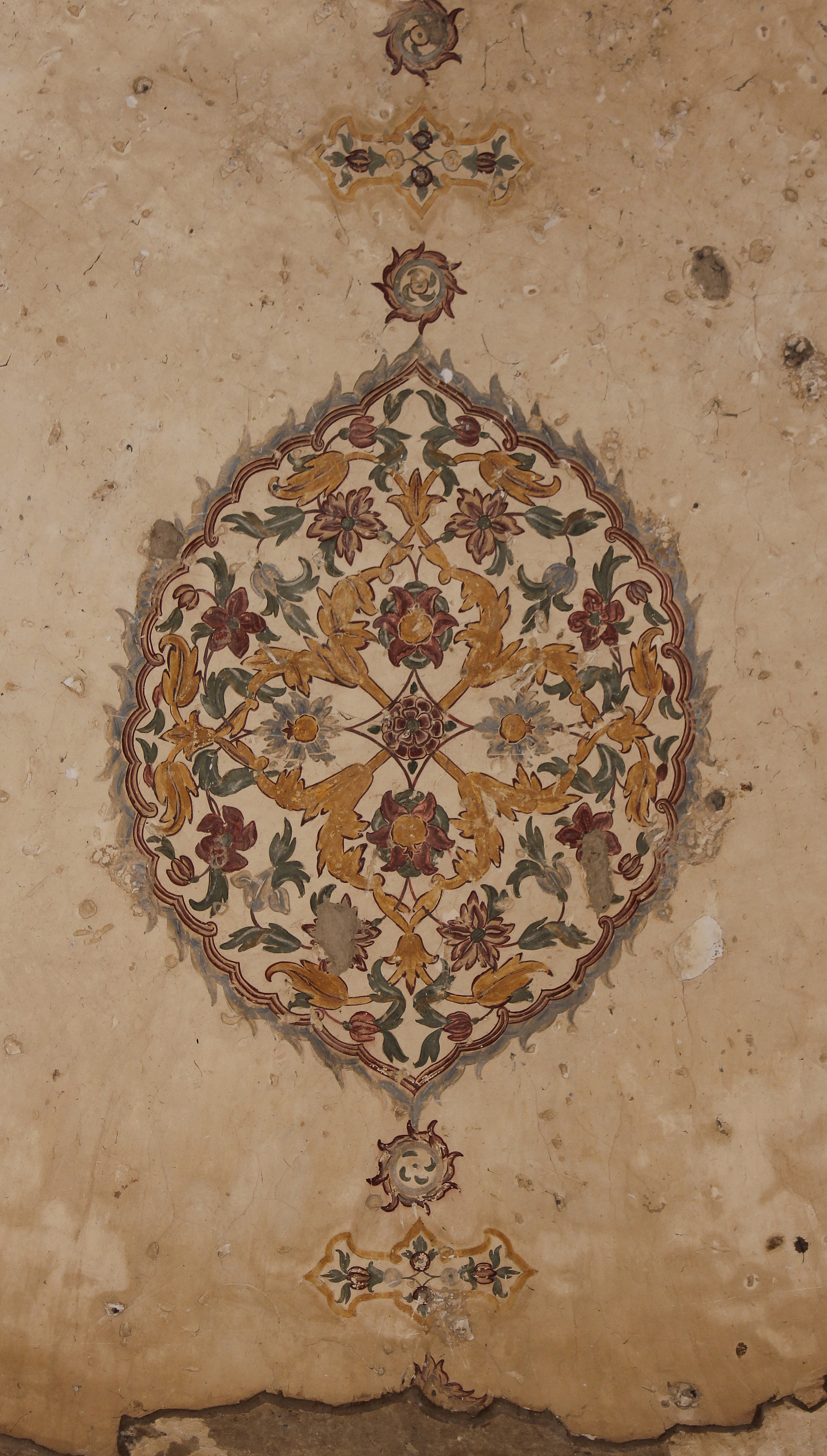
Mughal patterns inside Hiran Minar

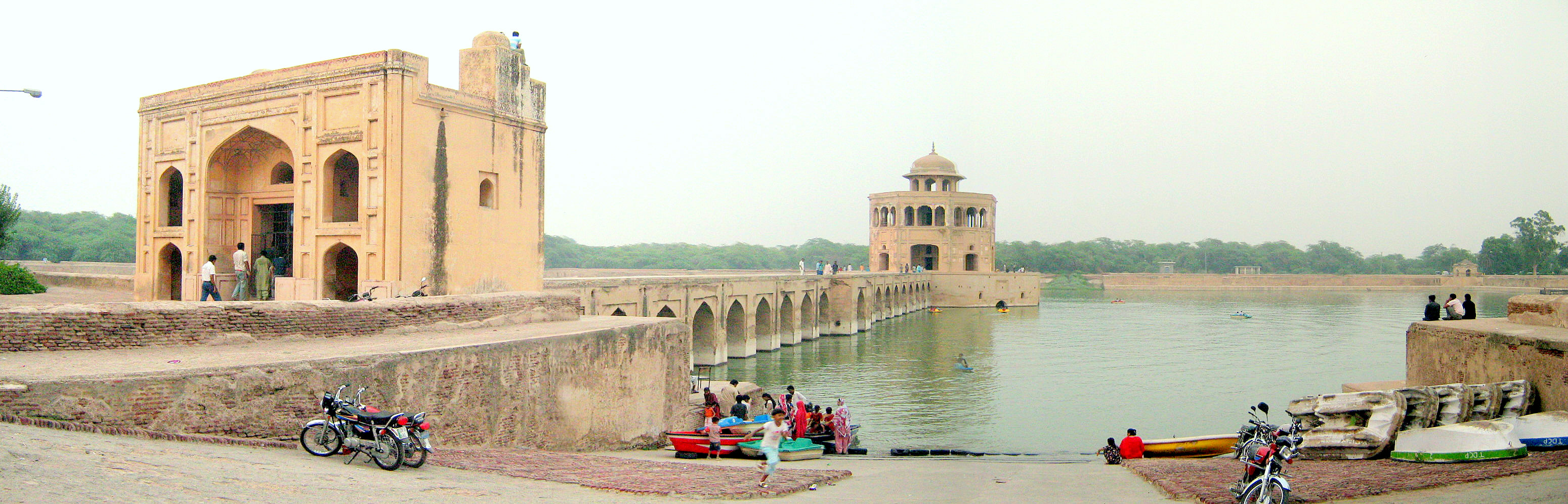
The Hiran Minar: Water Tank, Pavilion and Main Entrance

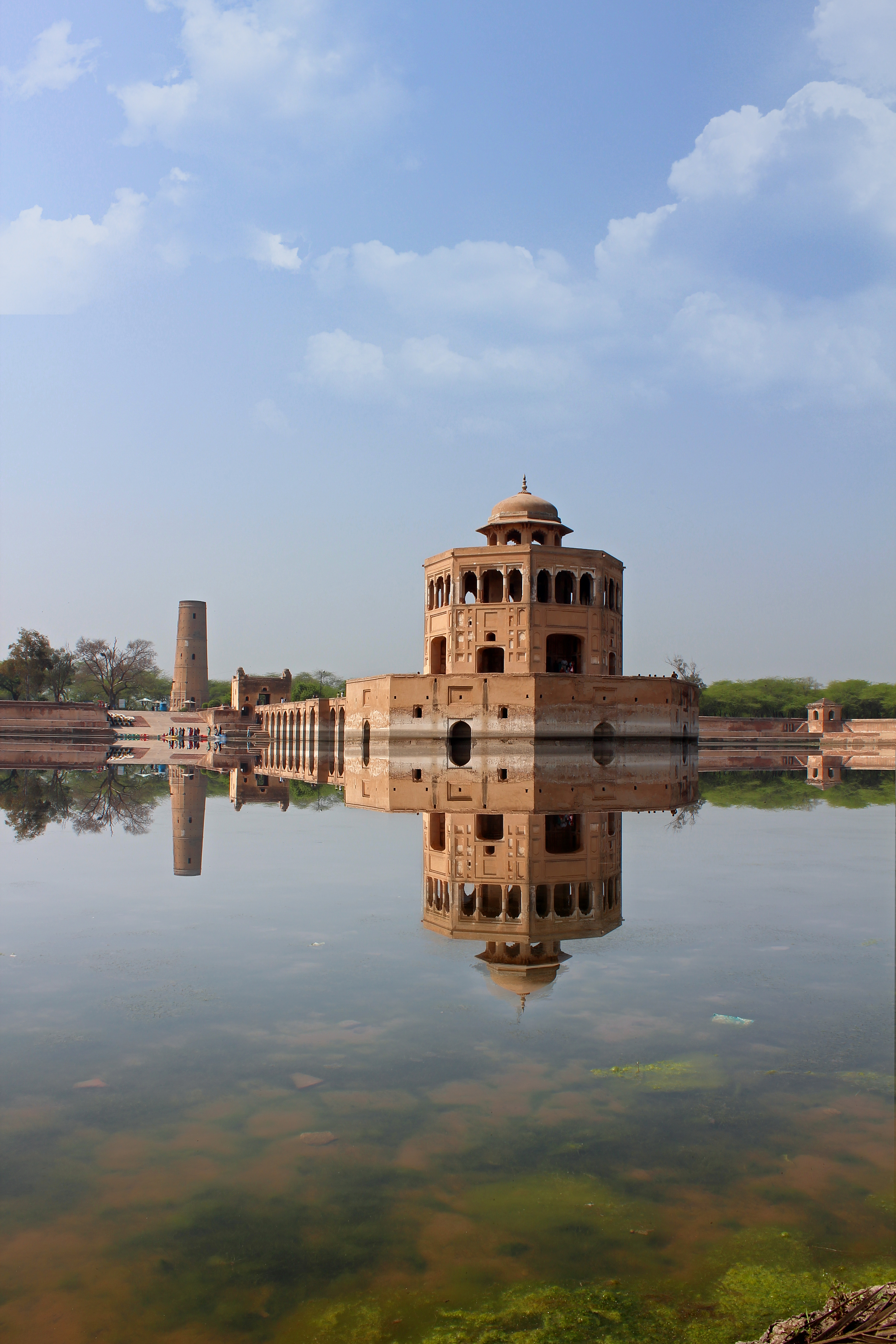
