= Deg outfall hydropower project Sheikhupura =

Pakistani hydroelectric dam in Punjab

- Official name: Deg outfall hydropower project Sheikhupura
- Location: Sheikhupura, Punjab, Pakistan
- Status: Operational
- Construction began: 2013
- Owner: Water and Power Development Authority (WAPDA)

Dam and spillways
- Type of dam: run-of-the-river
- Impounds: Upper Chenab Canal

Deg outfall hydropower project
- Coordinates: 32°14′34″N 74°15′51″E
- Operator: WAPDA
- Installed capacity: 4.04 MW

Deg outfall hydropower project is located on the Upper Chenab Canal near Rachna industrial area Sheikhupura, Punjab in Pakistan. The plant capacity is 4.04 megawatts (MW). Its construction is funded by the Asian Development Bank. Construction of an approximately 5.2-metre (17 ft) long and 3.7 m (12 ft) wide access road is also part of this project which will connect the plant with the Lahore-Sheikhupura road. 56.46 acres of land was acquired for this project in 2013.

== Spillway ==
The project will have seven spillway units of broad crested with radial gates (Glacis Type).

== Salient features ==
- Rated Discharge = 120 m^{3}/s
- Rated Net Head = 4.0 m
- Installed Capacity = 4.04 MW
- Annual Energy = 27.65 GWh
- Plant Factor = 78.13%
- No. of Units = 2 (Horizontal shaft double regulated Kaplan turbines)
- Levelized Tariff = 9.1852 (Pak Rs. / kWh)
- Access to Site = On UCC via Lahore-Sheikhupura road.

== Collapse of structure ==
In 2017, structure of the project collapsed; the Punjab government established an inquiry team to investigate the incident.

== Nearby landmarks ==
- Quaid-e-Azam Business Park Sheikhupura
- Rachna industrial area Shekhupura
- Wapda Town Sheikhupura
- Atlas Honda Power Plant
- Nestle Sheikhupura
