= Herdaiv =

Village in Pakistan

Coordinates: 31.807°N 74.048°E

Herdaiv is a village in Pakistan, about 10 kilometers north of Sheikhupura.
