= Murder of Asif Nawaz =

2025 murder in Sheikhupura, Punjab, Pakistan

Asif Nawaz
- Born: c. 1980; Sheikhupura, Punjab, Pakistan
- Died: 14 April 2025 (aged 45); Sheikhupura, Punjab, Pakistan
- Cause of death: Gunshot or fire
- Known for: Victim of the anti-Israel protests

Asif Nawaz (c. 1980 – 14 April 2025) was a Pakistani employee and a staff member at KFC who was shot and killed by unidentified supporters of the Tehreek-e-Labbaik Pakistan (TLP) during the group's anti-Israel protest in Sheikhupura, Punjab.

Accident and personal enmity were ruled as motives, leading it to be registered under Section 302 of the Pakistan Penal Code and Section 7 of the Anti-Terrorism Act and at least 40 people being taken into custody in relation to the murder. The prime suspects remained at large. The murder led to condemnations from Pakistani authorities.

== Background ==
In early April 2025, protests by right wing parties against KFC took off. Between 7–9 April, protesters affiliated with right-wing groups stormed multiple KFC outlets in Karachi, forcibly shutting down branches across the city, hurling stones at the premises, and chanting slogans condemning American food franchises. Multiple people were arrested in relation to the violent protests. On 9 April, in Mirpur Khas, a KFC outlet was set on fire during a protest against Israeli actions in Gaza. The mob vandalized the restaurant and attempted to set it ablaze.

On 10 April, in Larkana, individuals pelted stones at a KFC outlet, causing damage to the property. On the same day, police foiled an attempted attack on a KFC outlet in the Korangi Industrial Area, where around 40–60 individuals tried to damage the restaurant but were dispersed by law enforcement, resulting in the arrest of 10 suspects. Following these incidents, authorities imposed Section 144 in Karachi’s Central district to prevent further gatherings and potential attacks on fast-food outlets. Also another KFC was vandalized by members of Tehreek-e-Labbaik Pakistan, in Lahore leading to 11 arrests.

On 13 April, hundreds of anti-Israel protests stormed a KFC outlet in Sukkur, vandalizing it then set it ablaze. On 14 April an attack on a KFC outlet in Rawalpindi where employees and customers were abused and threatened, led to Islamabad police detaining five people who were involved.

== Incident ==
On 14 April, an anti-Israel protest was organized by Tehreek-e-Labbaik Pakistan with assurances from the organizers that the demonstration would remain peaceful. At 11:05 PM, two individuals approached the KFC outlet, and one of them opened fire, striking Asif Nawaz, a 45-year-old employee from Khan Colony, who was working in the kitchen at the time. He was rushed to the hospital but succumbed to his injuries.

== Investigation ==
Forensic experts from the Punjab Forensic Science Agency were called to assist with evidence collection and analysis. The investigation revealed that the bullet was shot from a distance of 100 feet and struck Nawaz in the shoulder before traveling to his chest. The police ruled out an accidental shooting and personal enmity and an FIR was registered under Section 302 of the Pakistan Penal Code and Section 7 of the Anti-Terrorism Act.

== Reaction ==
=== Arrests ===
Punjab Police and intelligence agencies initiated a search operation in Sheikhupura, arresting 40 suspects. However, the prime suspect remained at large.

=== Condemnation ===
The murder led to widespread condemnation from Pakistani Government and social media users. Azma Bokhari, Punjab Information Minister, called it a planned act of terrorism and vowed to bring the culprits to justice.
