= Maqsood Saqib =

Pakistani publisher and writer (including editor and translator) (born 1955)

Maqsood Saqib مقصود ثاقب
- Born: مقصود احمد; 4 April 1955 (age 71); Sheikhupura, Punjab, Pakistan
- Occupations: Story writer, editor and publisher

Maqsood Saqib (born 4 April 1955) is a Pakistani Punjabi writer, editor and publisher.

He published a magazine, Maan Boli, from 1986 until 1997 and now he has been publishing the monthly magazine under the name Pancham from 1998. He received a Bhai Vir Singh award for publishing the best magazine in both the East and the West Punjab. He runs a publishing house, Suchet Kitab Ghar, with his wife, Faiza Raʼana.

== Biography ==
=== Early life ===
Saqib was born in Sheikhupura, Punjab, Pakistan into a family with an agricultural background.

== Works ==
=== Collections of stories ===
- KahaniyaaN (1986)
- Sucha Tilla tay Hor KahaniyaaN (1995)

=== Edited ===
- Abyat of Hazrat Sultan Bahu (2004)
- Oxford Picture Dictionary English-Punjabi (2014)
- Hymns of Baba Farid Shakar Ganj
- Hymns of Baba Nanak (2005)
- Sangeet Karan Dian Gallan
- Lok Boli Lok Vihar (2013)

=== Translations ===
- Pankh Mukt (2002)
- Comradaan Naal Turdean

== Awards ==
- Bhai Vir Singh Award (1990)
