= Zulfiqar Ahmad Dhillon =

Pakistani politician and retired brigadier

Personal details
- Born: 2 October 1948 (age 78) Addian village, Ferozewala, Sheikhupura, Punjab Pakistan
- Died: Unknown
- Relations: Son of Chaudry Laal Khan Dhillon, and younger brother of Chaudry Nisar Ahmed Dhillon
- Education: Government College Lahore

Military service
- Allegiance: Pakistan
- Branch/service: Pakistan Army
- Rank: Brigadier

Zulfiqar Ahmad Dhillon (born October 2, 1948, in Addian village, Punjab) is a Pakistani politician and a retired brigadier in the Pakistan Army. He is a son of Chaudry Laal Khan Dhillon and younger brother of Chaudry Nisar Ahmed Dhillon.

After retiring from the Army, Dhillon was a Pakistani Punjabi politician from the Pakistan Muslim League (Q) and served as the provincial minister education for Punjab between 1997 and 1999.

Subsequently, he was elected as a member of Pakistan National Assembly in the 2002 general elections.

He graduated from Government College Lahore in 1959 with a Bsc. in agriculture and then joined the Pakistan Military Academy and was commissioned in 1962.

During his tenure in the Pakistan Army he attended Command and Staff College, Quetta, from 1972 to 1974.
