= Zaka Ullah Bhangoo =

- Born: Zaka Ullah Bhangoo; 1947; Sheikhupura, Pakistan
- Died: 13 May 2007 (aged 59–60) south of Trabzon, Turkey
- Burial place: Sheikhupura, Punjab; Kot Roshin Din, Sheikupura
- Military career
- Allegiance: Pakistan
- Branch: Pakistan Army
- Service years: 1968–2000
- Rank: Brigadier
- Unit: 23rd Frontier Force Regiment
- Commands: 1 Army Aviation Sqn
- Conflicts: Indo-Pakistani War of 1971; Siachen Conflict; Kargil War
- Awards: Sitara-e-Imtiaz (Posthumously), Sitara-e-Imtiaz (Military), Tamgah-e-Bisalat

Brigadier Zaka Ullah Bhangoo (1947 – 13 May 2007) was a Pakistan Army aviator and one-star general who, after his retirement, became involved in flying microlight aircraft. He was killed in a light plane crash in Turkey in May 2007 while attempting a flight from the United Kingdom to Pakistan.

== Early life and army career ==
Bhangoo was born in 1947 in Sheikhupura, Pakistan, educated at Lawrence College Ghora Gali, and commissioned into the Pakistan Army in 1968. He flew helicopters such as the Alouette and Puma, and fixed-wing aircraft such as the O-1 Bird Dog. He also flew helicopters for the Pakistan Army Aviation's VVIP flight for 8 years.

In 2001, he and a co-pilot (Lieutenant Colonel Ajab Khan) planned to fly an ultralight aircraft around the world in 80 days. The plane was a US-made Star Streak aircraft with a top speed of 209 km/h (130 mph). The flight did not ultimately take place due to logistical and diplomatic difficulties.

== Flight incident and death ==
In 2007, he was piloting a light plane with an English friend, Mick Newman, on a flight from the United Kingdom to Pakistan. The pair had set off in a twin-seater Sky Arrow 650T microlight from Trabzon in Turkey but crashed 30 miles (48 km) south of the city on 13 May 2007. After the crash, The Daily Telegraph reported that Osman Güneş, the Turkish interior minister, claimed that the pair were being trailed by the MİT, Turkey's intelligence organization.
