= Quaid-e-Azam Business Park Sheikhupura =

Industrial park in Pakistan

Quaid-e-Azam Business Park Sheikhupura (Urdu: قائد اعظم بزنس پارک شیخُوپُورہ) is an industrial park in Pakistan, spread over 1536 acres of land located on the M-2 Lahore-Islamabad Motorway near Sheikhupura. It has been designated as a special economic zone by the Pakistan government.

The park is operated by the Punjab Industrial Estate Development and Management Company (PIEDMC).

== History ==
The business park had initially been named the Quaid-e-Azam Apparel Park; the name was changed in November 2019.

In 2020, Chief Minister of Punjab Usman Buzdar said the park would go a long way in boosting industrialization in Pakistan and create approximately half a million jobs while a labour colony would also be built in the Quaid-e-Azam Business Park over 200 acres.

In March 2020, Prime Minister of Pakistan Imran Khan was scheduled to inaugurate the business park, but this was delayed due to the COVID-19 pandemic. Punjab Industrial Estates Development and Management Company (PIEDMC) claimed that more than 300 national and multinational companies had shown interest in establishing industrial units in the business park. Quaid-e-Azam Business Park Sheikhupura was officially launched on 18th July 2020.

In 2024, a delegation of industrialists met the provincial Minister, Chaudhry Shafay Hussain. They were keen to set up a factory at the Quaid-e-Azam Business Park.

A dozen industries designated as preferred industries for the park are: manufacturing services, auto parts, pharmaceuticals, chemicals, light engineering, plastics, information technology, electronics, food and beverages, logistics, mobile manufacturing and warehousing.
