= Shaikhpur, Uttar Pradesh =

Shaikhpur, Handaur, Pratapgarh Shaikhpur
- village
- Location in Uttar Pradesh, India Shaikhpur, Handaur, Pratapgarh (India)
- Coordinates: 25°55′46″N 81°47′44″E
- Country: India
- State: Uttar Pradesh
- District: Pratapgarh

Government
  - Body: Gram panchayat

Languages
  - Official: Hindi
- Time zone: UTC+5:30 (IST)
- PIN: 230136
- Vehicle registration: UP
- Nearest city: Allahabad
- Website: up.gov.in

Shaikhpur is a small village in Pratapgarh district, Uttar Pradesh. The nearest river is the Loni River. It is situated near State Highway 36.

Shaikhpur is located 24 km from Pratapgarh and 150 km from Lucknow.
