= Sheikhpur, Ballia =

Village in Ballia district, India

Sheikhpur is a village in the Ballia district, Uttar Pradesh, India, (formerly in the District of Azam Garh, UP).
