= Sheikhupura Fort =

17th-century fort in Pakistan

- شیخوپورہ قلعہ
- Sheikhupura, Punjab
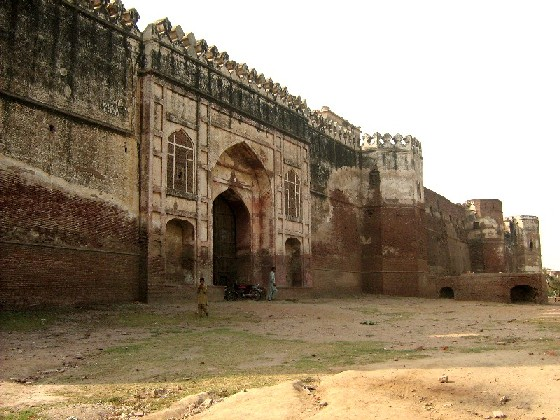

Site information
- Owner: Department of Archaeology & Museums, Government of Pakistan
- Website: http://skp.com.pk/city-sheikhupura/historical-places/qila-sheikhupura-sheikhupura-fort/

Location
- Coordinates: 31°42′N 73°59′E
- Height: Average 11.5 m

Site history
- Built: 1607; 419 years ago

Sheikhupura Fort (Punjabi, Urdu: شیخوپورہ قلعہ) is a 17th-century Mughal-era fort near the city of Sheikhupura in Punjab, Pakistan.

== History ==
The date of the construction of the fort is traditionally attributed to the reign of Emperor Jahangir. The emperor mentions in his autobiography that he entrusted the construction of a fort at Jahangirpur (Sheikhupura) to Sikander Muin, a local landlord, around 1607.

The fort was drastically altered during the Sikh-era, with numerous buildings constructed, some with exquisite Sikh frescoes. In 1808, the fort was conquered by a Sikh force led by Kharak Singh, the six-year-old son of Ranjit Singh. Ranjit Singh granted this fort as jagir in 1811 to his wife and the prince's mother, Datar Kaur who had a considerable role in its rehabilitation and lived in it to her last day, until 1838. In the mid-19th century when power turned to the British, the fort of Sheikhupura was used for the house arrest of Ranjit Singh's last queen and Duleep Singh's mother, Jind Kaur.

During colonial period it served as the District Headquarters of Gujranwala District until 1881. After 1918 it also served as police station. In 1967 it was declared a protected monument and is now under custody of the Department of Archaeology.

In 2010, the US government's Ambassadors Fund for Cultural Preservation granted 850,000 USD towards restoration of the fort.

== Layout ==
The fort is roughly in square shape and measures 128 metres by 115.5 metres. The walls average 11.5 m (38 ft) in height, varying from 11.12 to 12.4 metres. There are four octagonol bastions, one at each corner, with five further semi-circular bastions located within the walls. The main gate is located at the eastern side. The fort contains several havelis dating to the Sikh period which are adorned with colourful frescoes. The fort is quite formidable and dominates the skyline of the neighborhood.

== Gallery ==
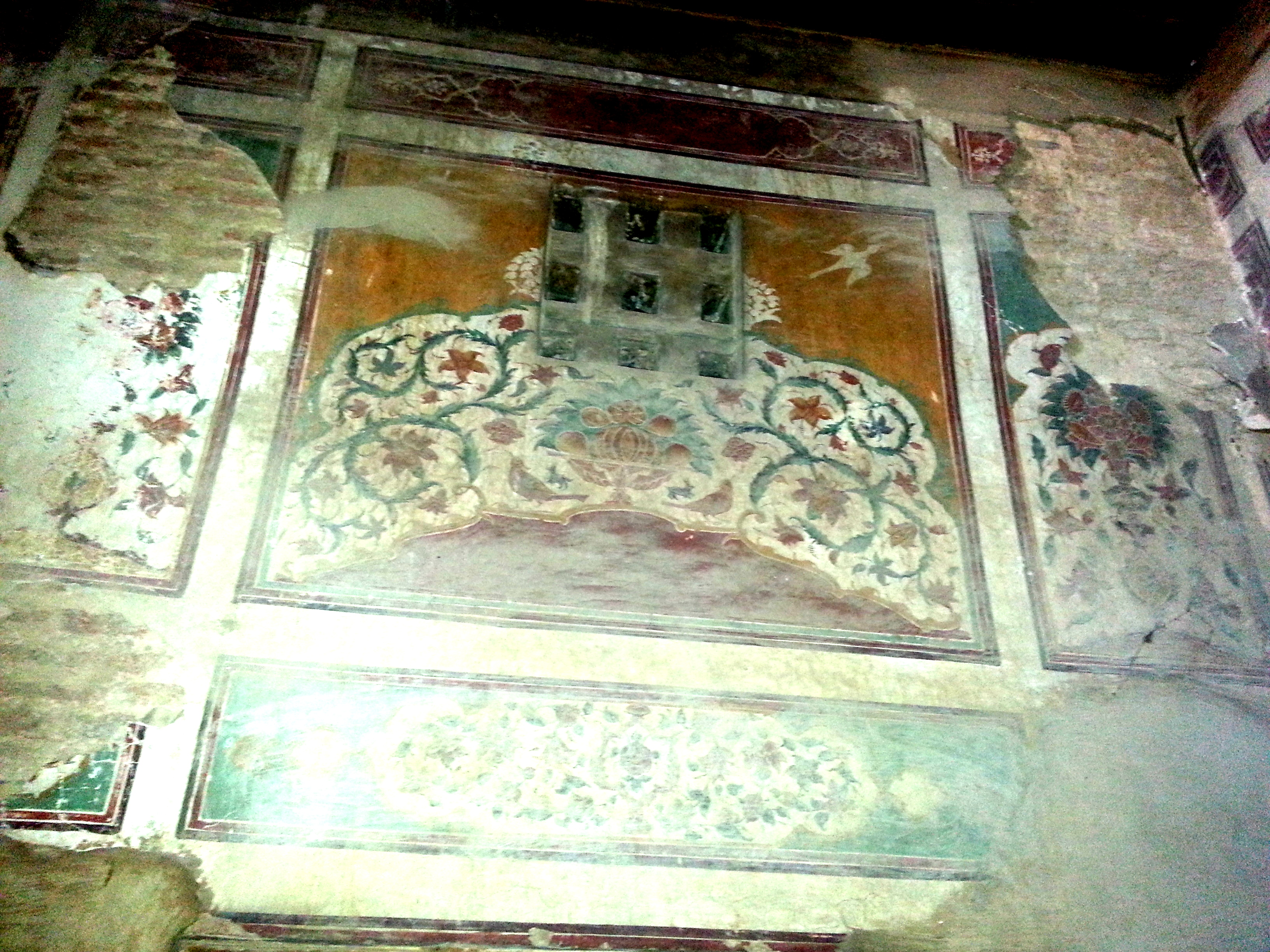

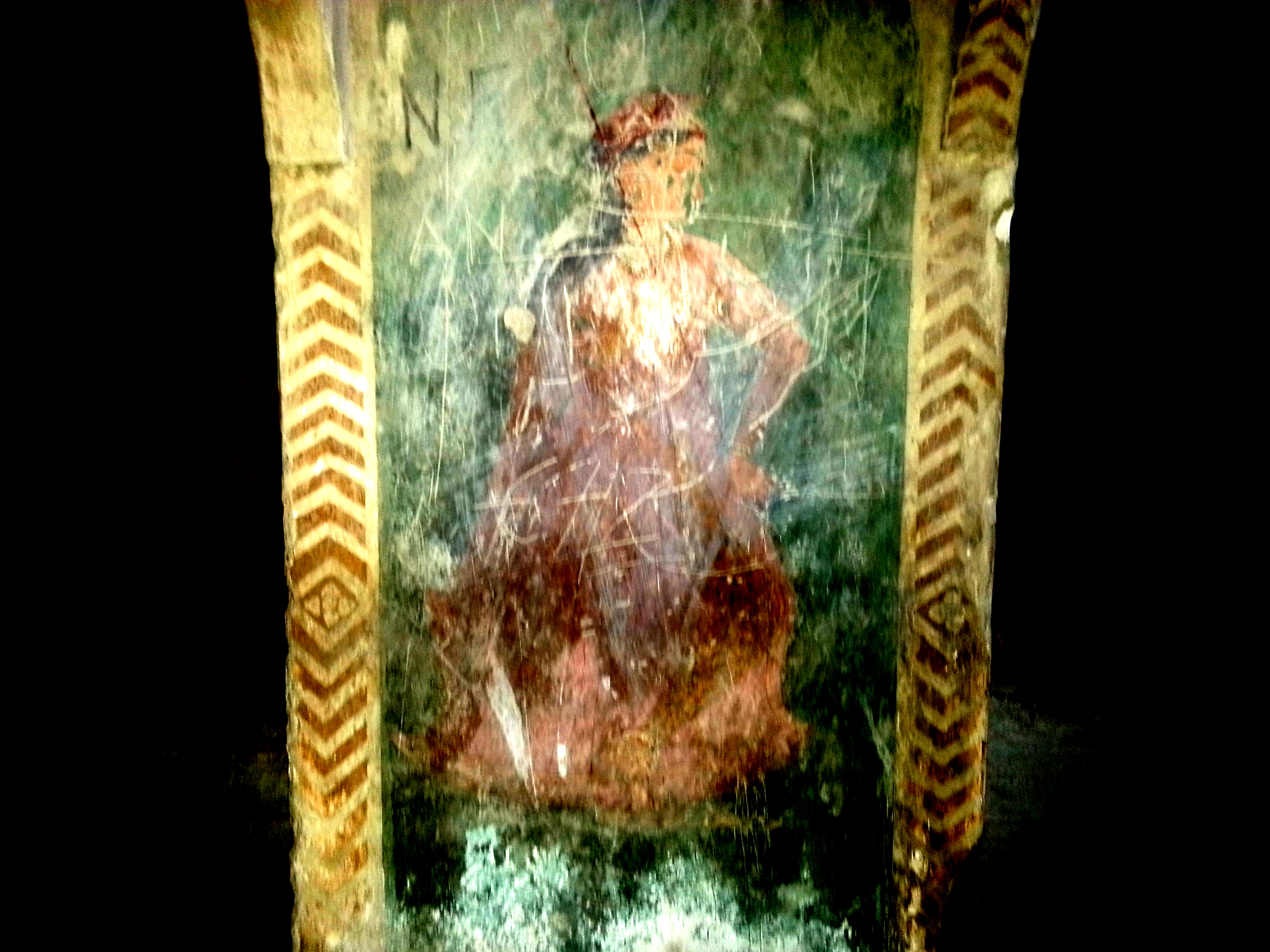

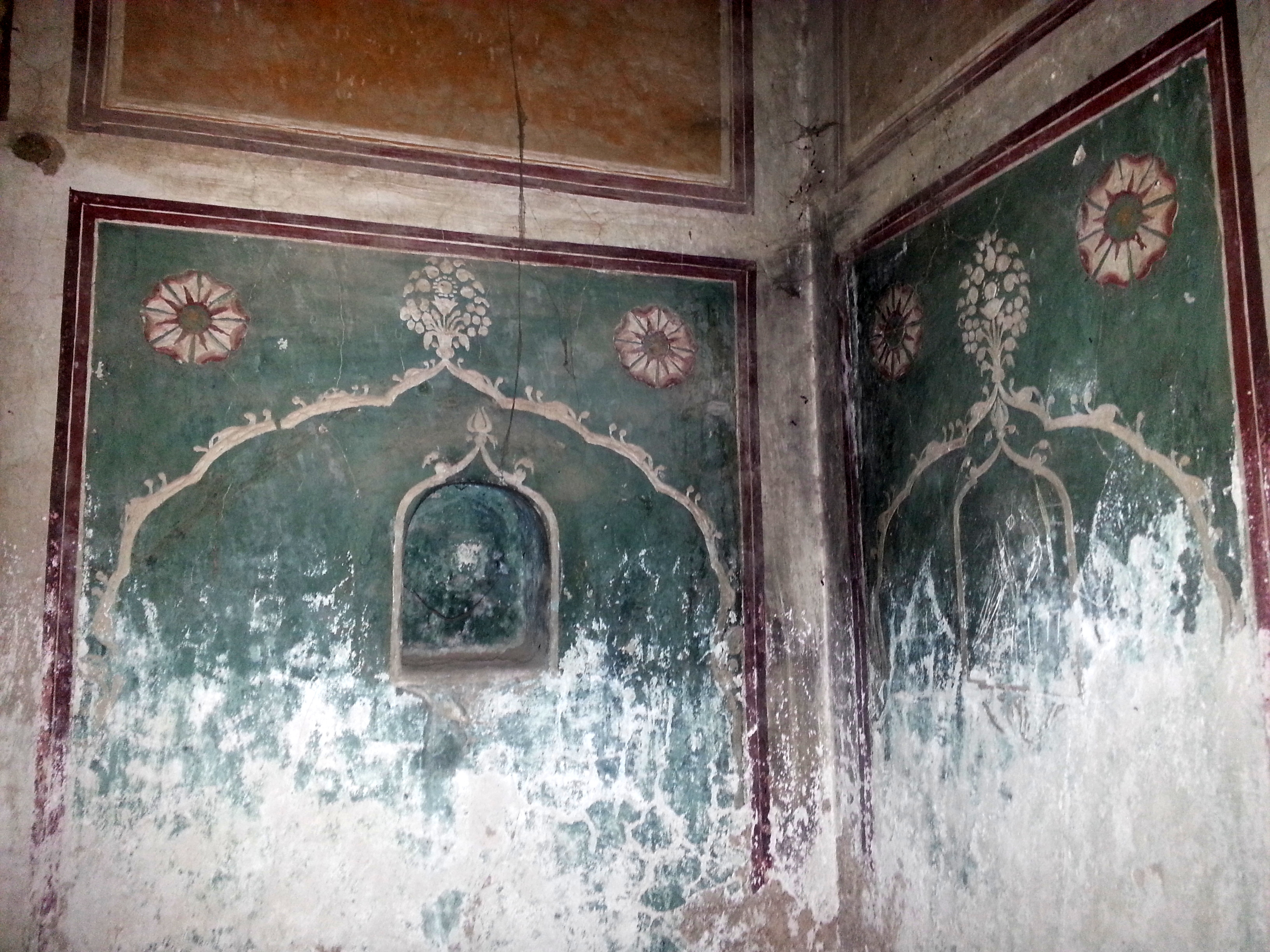

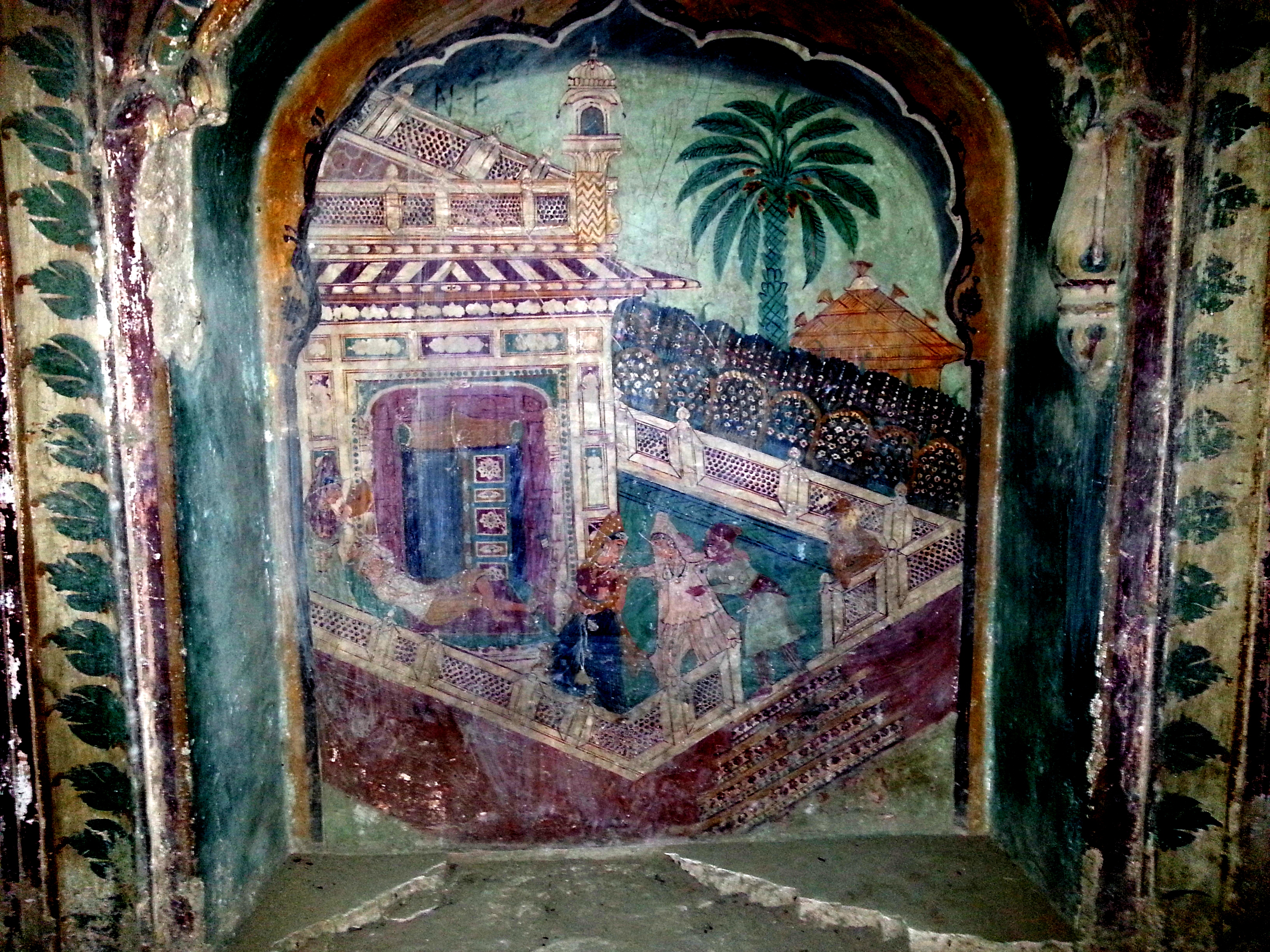

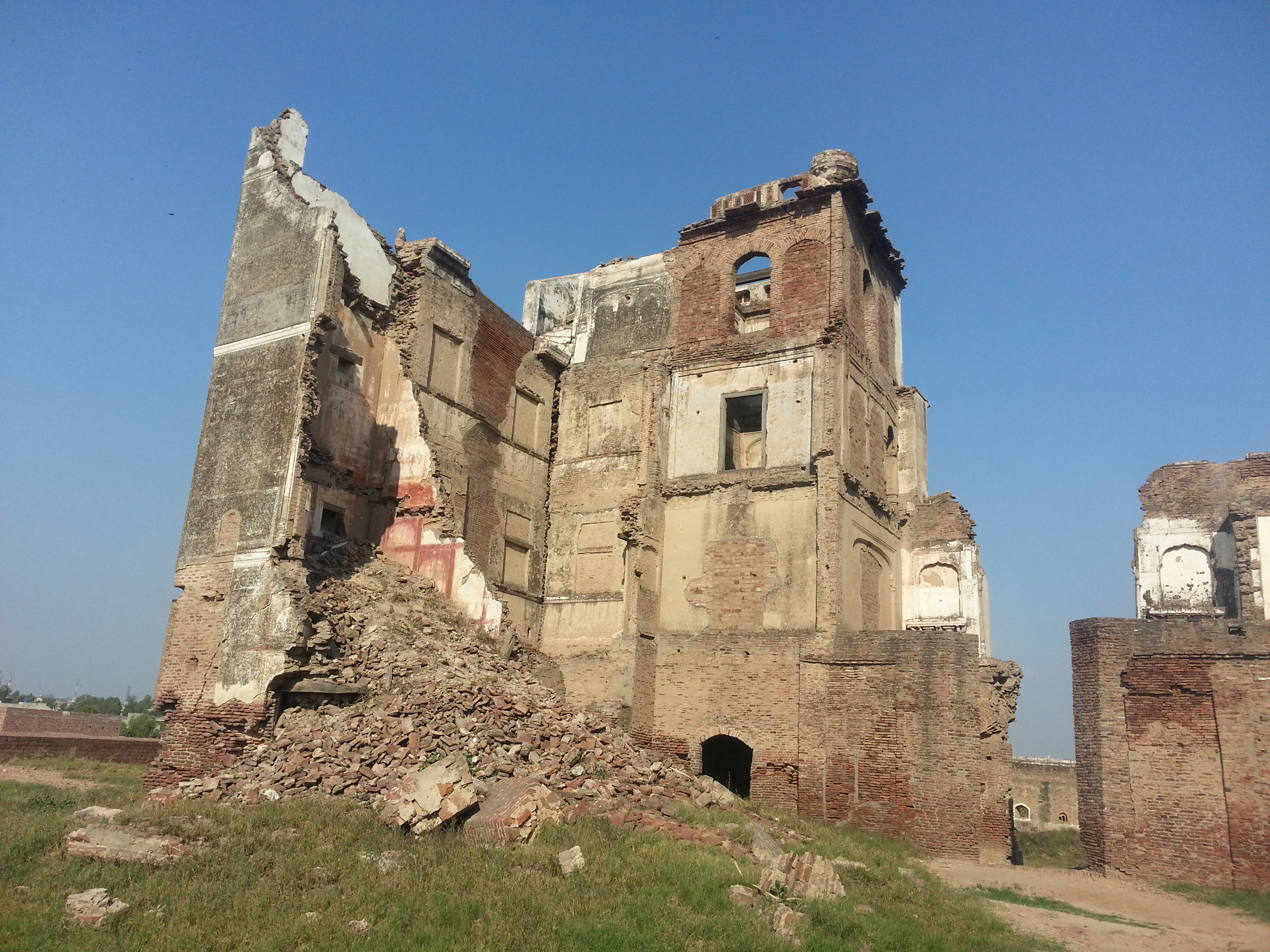

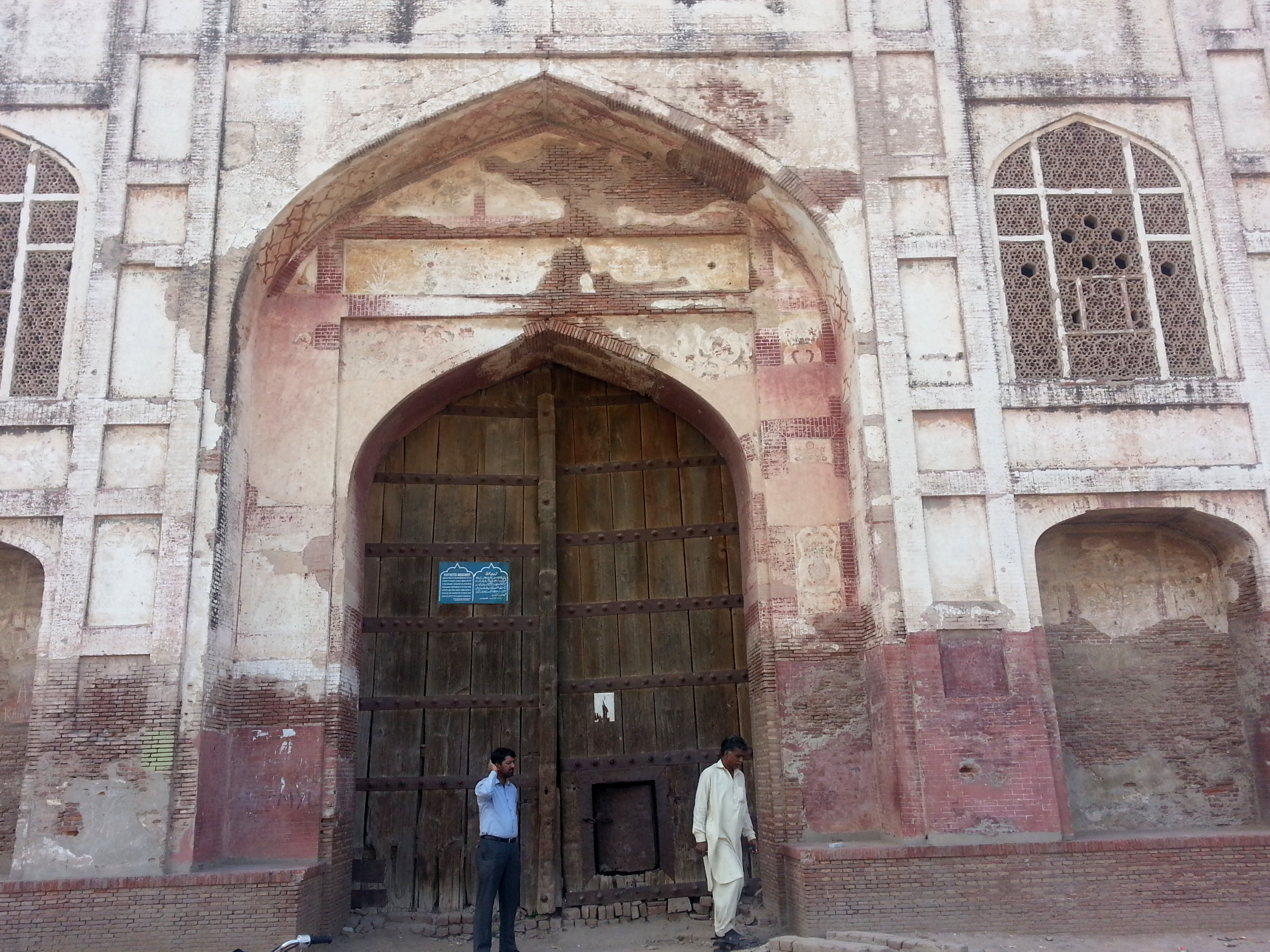

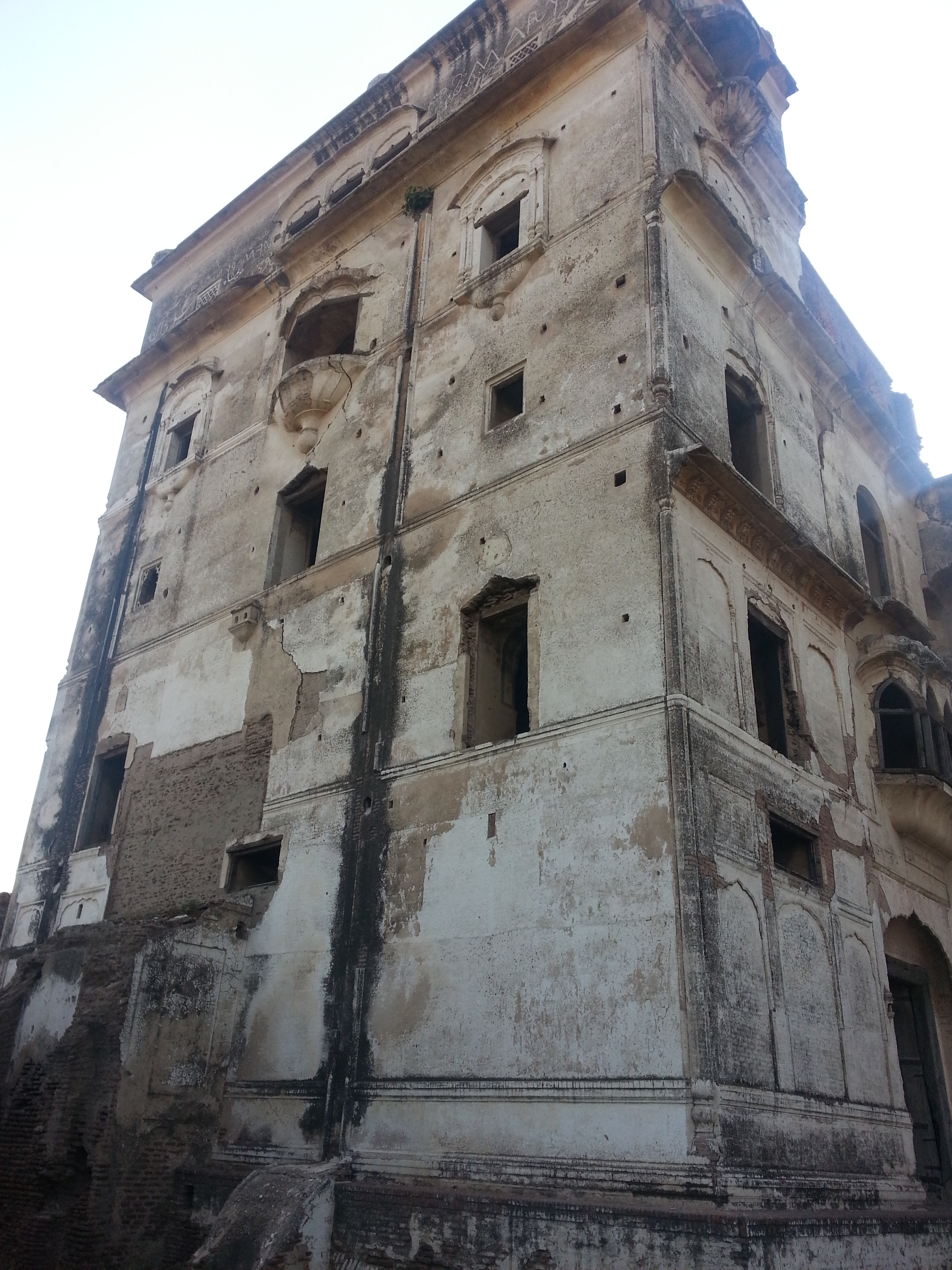

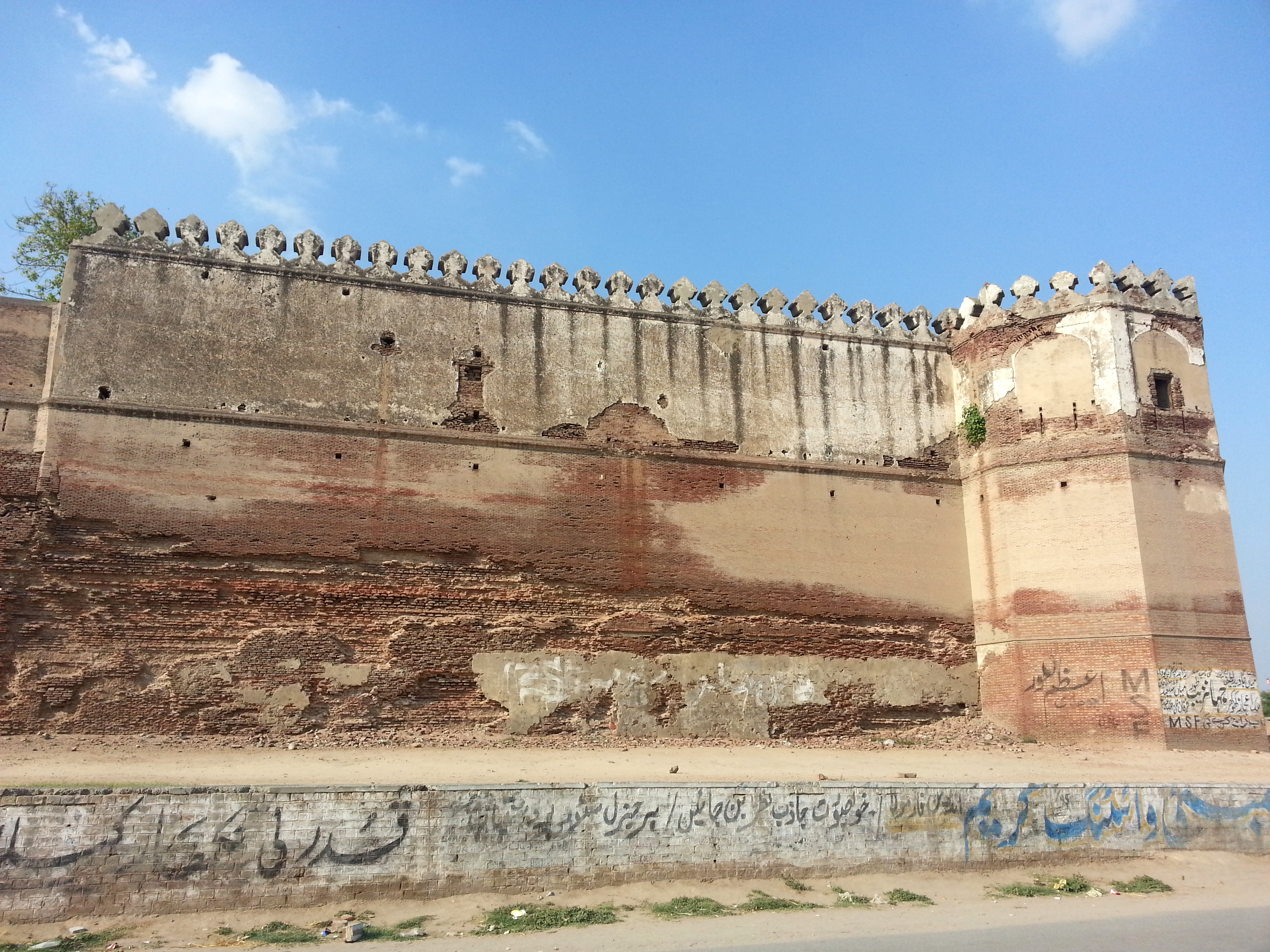

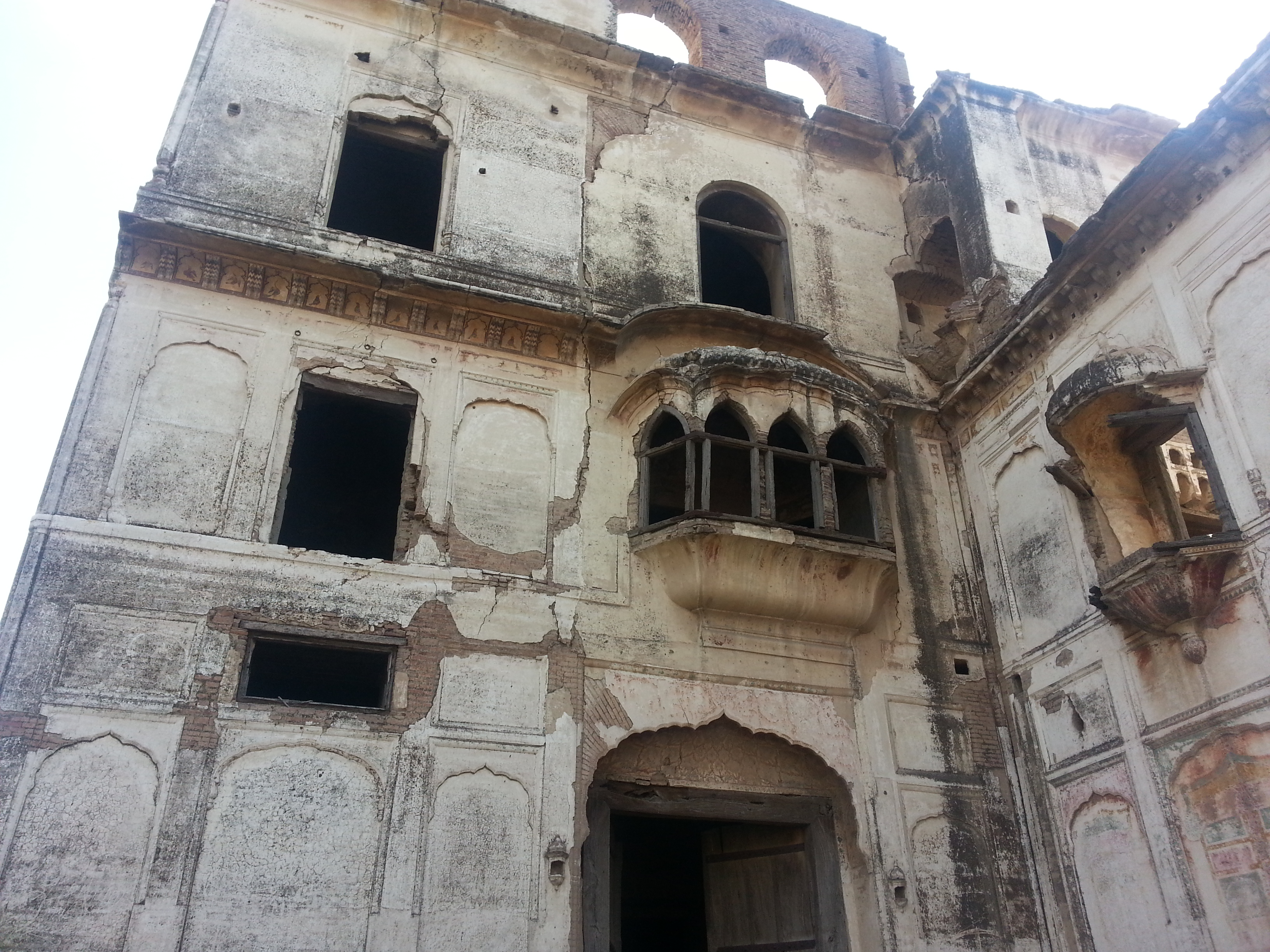

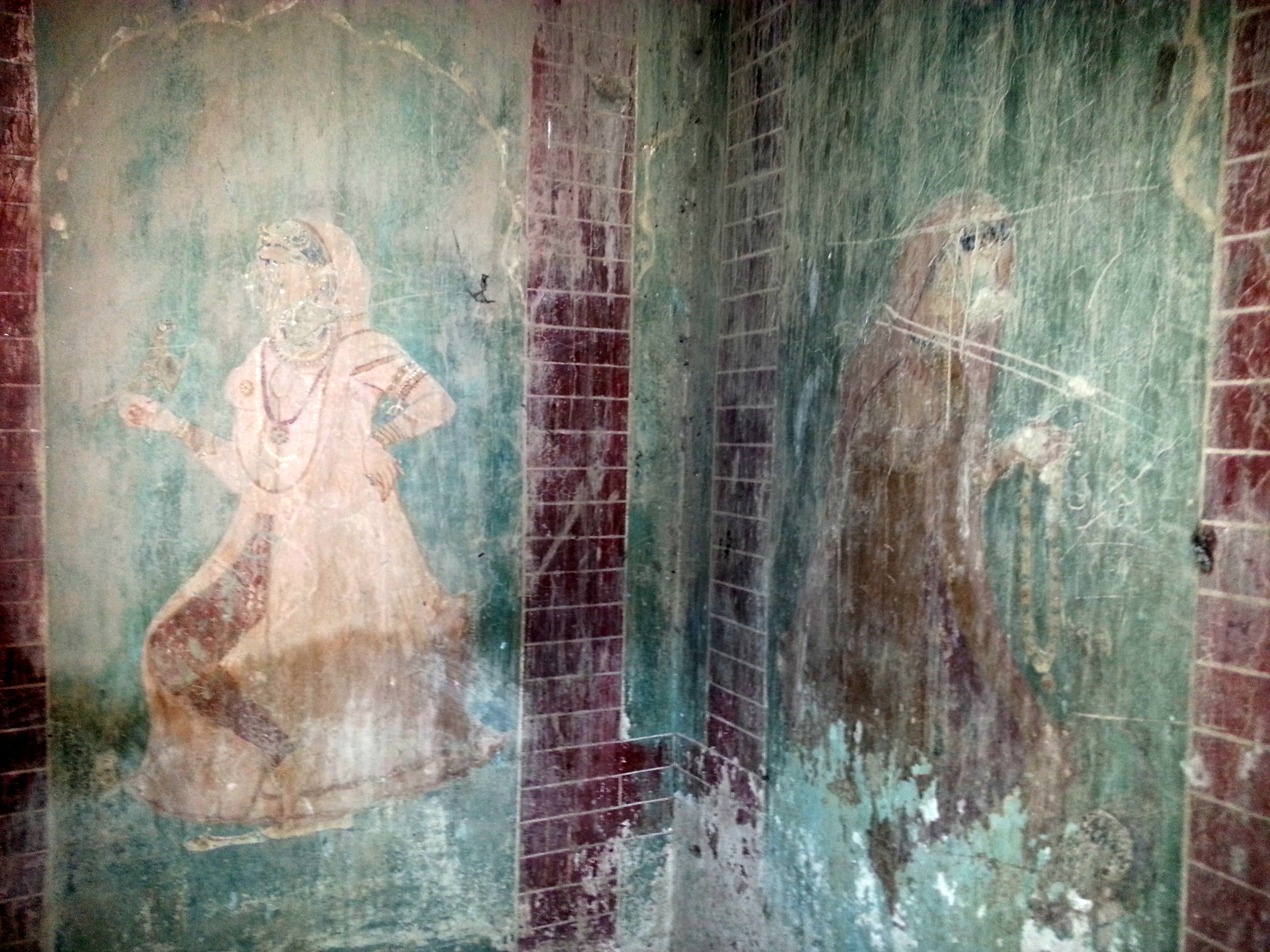

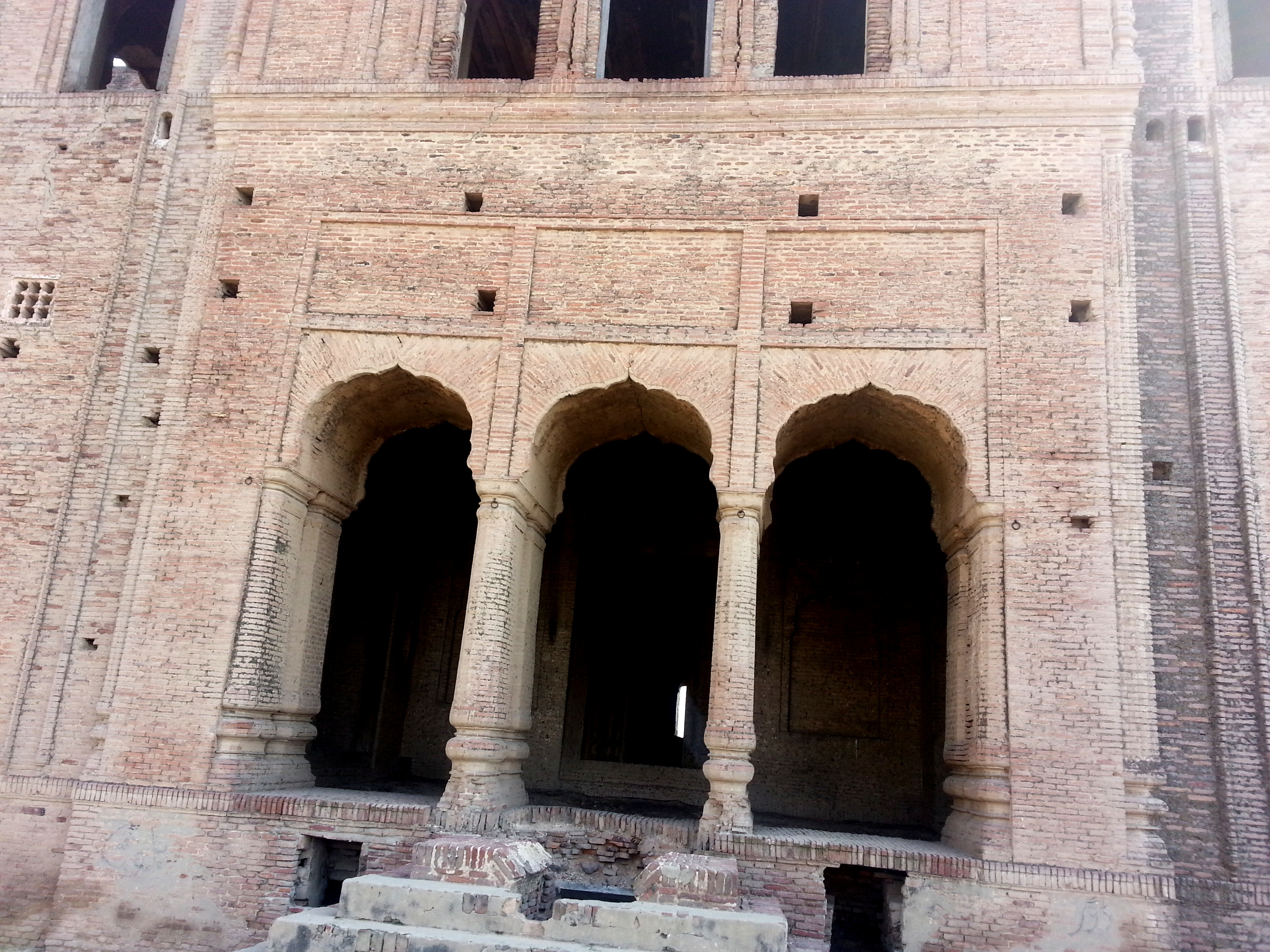

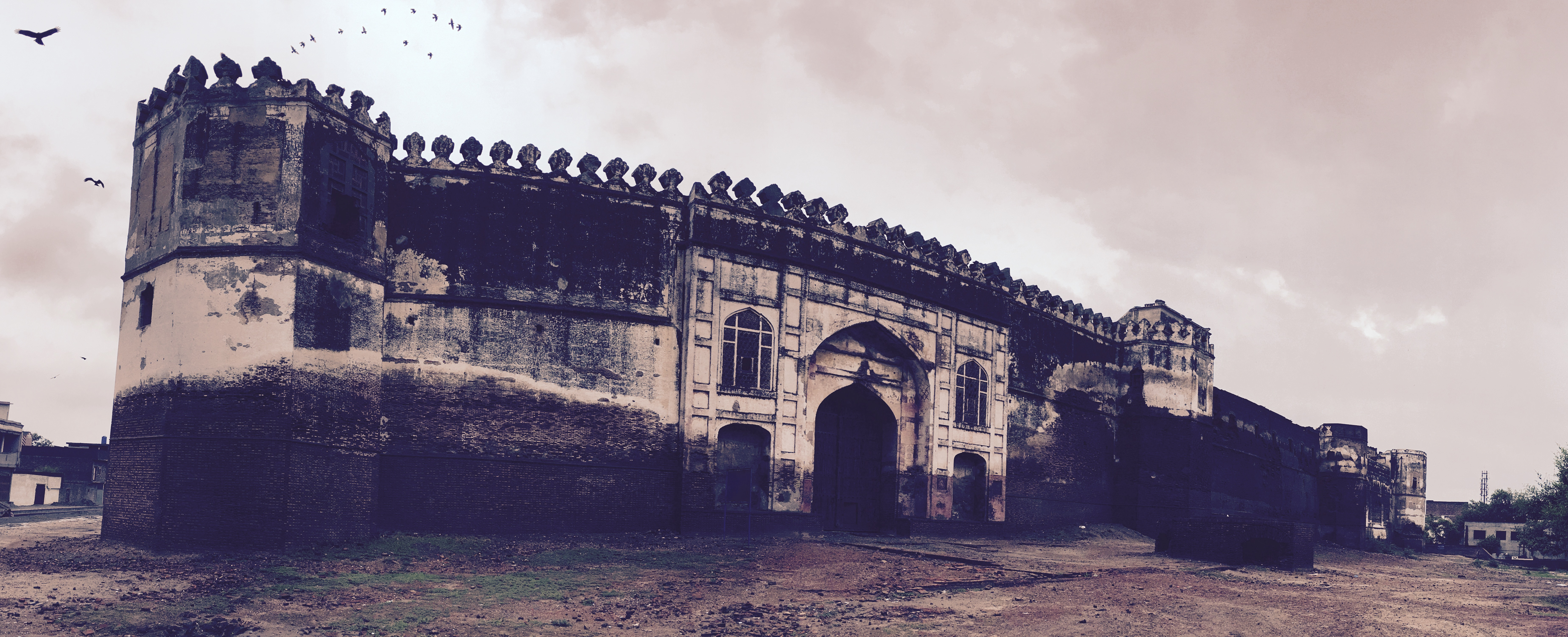
Qila Sheikhupura

== See also ==
- List of forts in Pakistan
- List of museums in Pakistan
