= Sheikhupura =

Sheikhupura: شیخوپورہ
- City
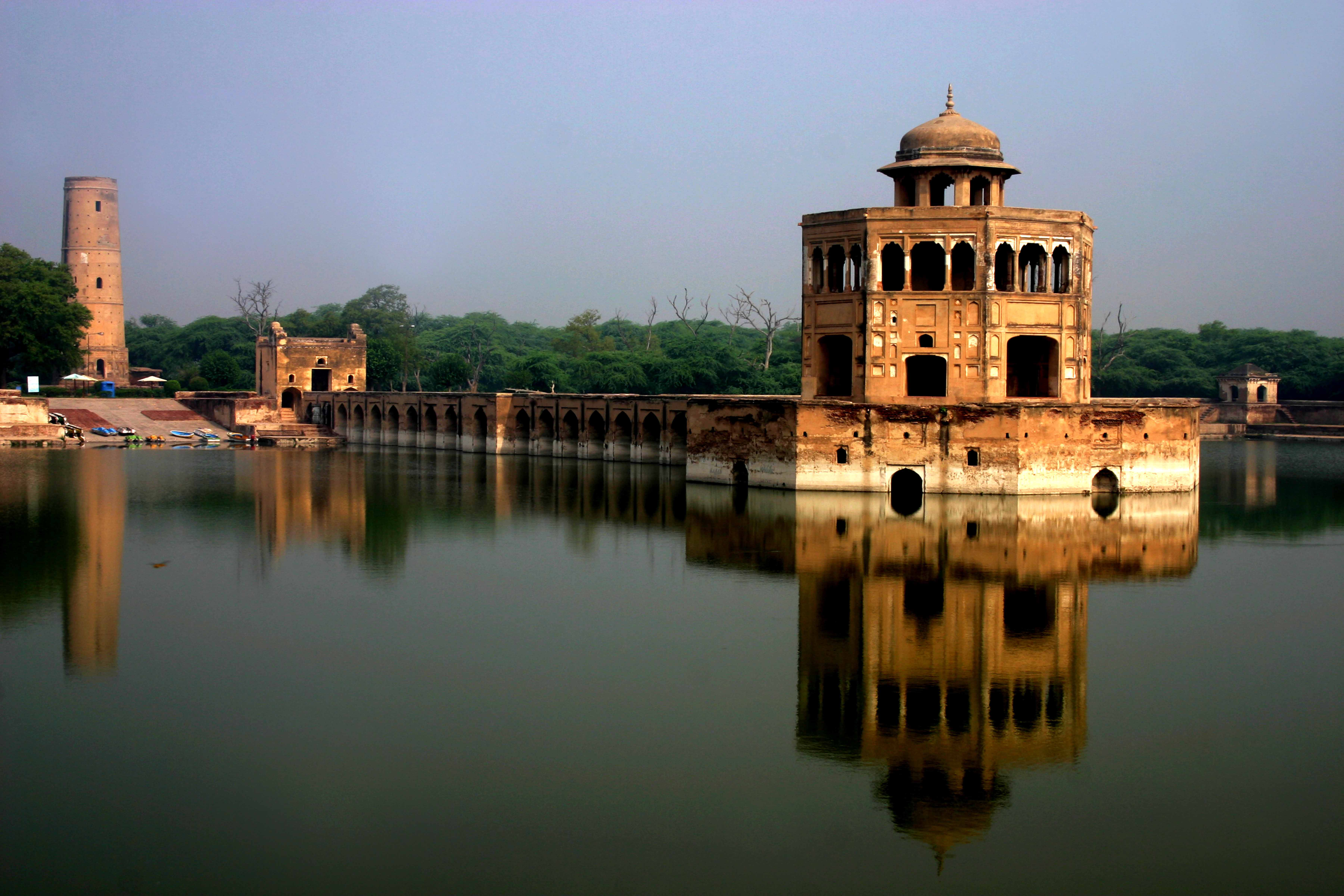
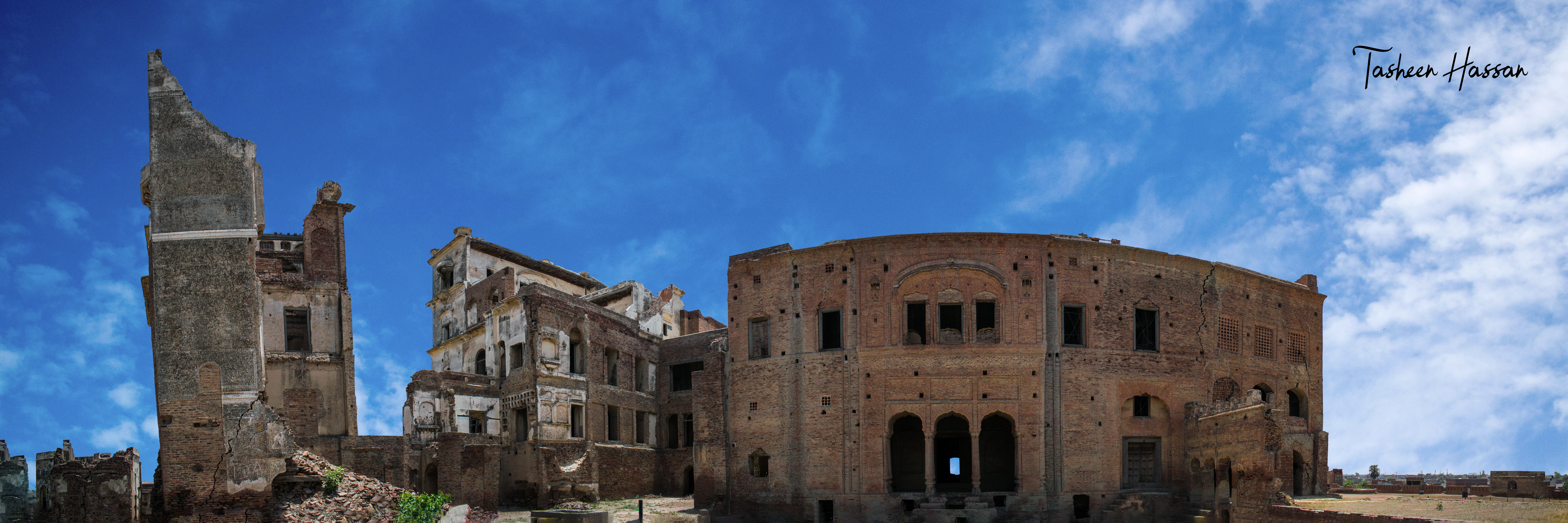
- From top: Hiran Minar, Sheikhupura Fort

- Location of Sheikhupura Sheikhupura (Pakistan)
- Coordinates: 31°42′40″N 73°59′16″E
- Country: Pakistan
- Province: (Punjab, Pakistan) Punjab
- Division: Lahore
- District: Sheikhupura
- Founder: Jahangir

Government
  - Type: Municipal Corporation
  - Mayor: Vacant
  - Deputy Mayor: Vacant

Area
  - City: 75 km^{2} (29 sq mi)
  - Metro: 3,030 km^{2} (1,170 sq mi)
- Elevation: 236 m (774 ft)

Population (2023 census)
  - City: 591,424
  - Rank: 15th, Pakistan
  - Density: 7,900/km^{2} (20,000/sq mi)
- Time zone: UTC+5 (PST)
- Postal code: 39350
- Calling code: 056
- Union council number: 51

Sheikhupura, (Note: Punjabi / Urdu: شیخوپورہ; pronounced [ʃeːxuˈpuːɾäː]) also known as Qila Sheikhupura (lit. 'Sheikhupura Fort'), is a city in the Pakistani province of Punjab. It was founded by the Mughal emperor Jahangir in 1607 as a citadel, west of Lahore. Sheikhupura is the 10th-largest city in Punjab and 15th-largest in Pakistan by population, serving as the headquarters of Sheikhupura District. The city is an industrial centre and satellite town, and is located about 38 km northwest of Lahore. It also borders Sialkot, Gujranwala, Nankana Sahib and Kasur districts of Punjab, Pakistan.

== Etymology ==
In 1607, the Mughals constructed a new fort in the city. The city's first name is recorded in the Emperor Jahangir's autobiography, the Tuzk-e-Jahangiri, in which he refers to the town as Jehangir pura. The city then came to be known by its current name, which derives from Jehangir's nickname "Shekhu" that was given to him by his mother, wife of Akbar the Great.

It was previously known as Virkgarh, as the Virk Jats were the main rural tribe in the area before Jahangir. It would later briefly be called Singhpuria under Sikh rule, before being renamed back to Sheikhupura.

== History ==
=== Mughal ===
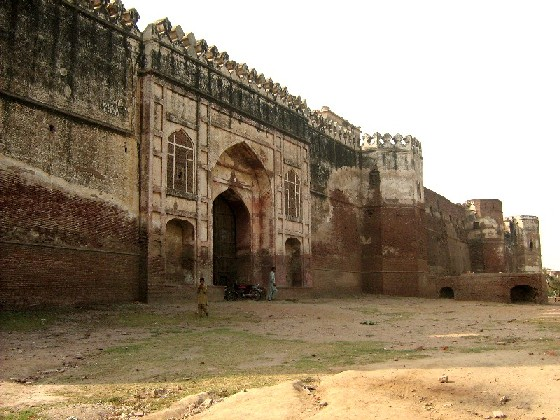
The Sheikhupura Fort was established in 1607.

Mughal emperor Jahangir laid the foundations of Sheikhupura in 1607 near the older town of Jandiala Sher Khan, an important provincial town during the early to middle Mughal era. He also erected the nearby Hiran Minar, Sheikhupura's most well-known site, between 1607 and 1620 as a monument to his beloved pet deer, Mansiraj, at a time when the area served as a royal hunting ground for the emperor. Jehangir laid the foundation of the Sheikhupura Fort in 1607, which is situated in the city's centre.

=== British ===
During British colonial rule, the area was under the rule of Raja Dhayan Singh, and Bhatti possessions that had been seized by the Sikhs were restored. The large area between the Chenab and Ravi rivers were initially consolidated into a single district with Sheikhupura serving as its first headquarters, until 1851. The area around Sheikhupura attained District status in 1919, with M. M. L. Karry serving as its first administrator.

=== Partition ===
On the eve of the Partition of British India, Sikhs made up 19% of the district's population. Despite the area's Muslim majority, Sikhs had hoped that the boundary commission would award the area to India, given the proximity of Sheikhupura to the city of Nankana Sahib, revered as the birthplace of the founder of Sikhism, Guru Nanak. The city was spared the large-scale rioting that engulfed Lahore earlier in 1947, and the city's Sikh population did not shift to India before the Radcliffe Line that demarcated the border of the newly independent states of Pakistan and India was announced.

The Sikh population had not made arrangements to leave and remained trapped in the city until 31 August 1947. The city's Sacha Sauda refugee camp hosted upwards of 100,000 Sikh refugees who had come to the city after fleeing nearby Gujranwala and other surrounding areas earlier that year. Fierce violence erupted in the city, and an estimated 10,000 people were killed in Sheikhupura between 16 August and 31 August in communal rioting between Sikhs and Muslims.

== Education ==
The overall literacy rate of Sheikhupura is 43.6% which is increasing. Following are some of the notable educational institutes of the city:

- Government Graduate College for Boys, Civil Lines Sheikhupura
- Government Graduate College for Girls, Civil Lines Sheikhupura
- Government Pir Bahar Shah Degree College For Girls, Batti Chowk Sheikhupura
- Hajvery University, Sheikhupura Campus
- University of Central Punjab, Sheikhupura Campus
- Punjab College of Science
- Beaconhouse School System
- The City School
- Overseas Pakistanis Foundation
- Muslim Model School, Sheikhupura

== Demographics ==
Population

Historical population

Year	Pop.	±%
1951	29,717	—
1961	41,635	+40.1%
1972	80,560	+93.5%
1981	141,168	+75.2%

Year	Pop.	±%
1998	280,263	+98.5%
2017	473,129	+68.8%
2023	591,424	+25.0%

According to the 1998 Pakistan Census, the population of Sheikhupura city was recorded as 280,263. As per 2017 Census of Pakistan, the population of city was recorded as 473,129 with an increase of 68.82% in just 19 years.

According to the World Population Review, the city's population in 2026 is more than 602,000. This estimate includes Sheikhupura and its surrounding suburban areas.

=== Language ===
Languages of Sheikhupura MC (2023)
1. Punjabi (88.0%)
2. Urdu (10.7%)
3. Pashto (0.70%)
4. Others (0.60%)

In the 2023 census, 88% of the population spoke Punjabi, 10.7% spoke Urdu, 0.7% spoke Pashto and 0.6% spoke other languages.

== Industrial areas ==
Quaid-e-Azam Business Park Sheikhupura and Rachna Industrial Park are two industrial areas under development in Sheikhupura.

== Notable people ==
- Aaqib Javed, fast bowler for Pakistan cricket team
- Anjum Saeed, player for Pakistan hockey team
- Choudhry Bilal Ahmed, politician
- Ghulam Jilani Khan, the founder of the Chand Bagh School
- Kulwant Singh Virk, author
- Mohammad Asif, former cricketer
- Muhammad Javed Buttar, is a former justice of Supreme Court of Pakistan
- Muhammad Nawaz Bhatti, late judge of the Punjab High Court and lawyer
- Nawab Kapur Singh, a key figure of the Sikh Confederacy and founder of the Singhpuria Misl
- Rana Naved-ul-Hasan, player for the Pakistan national cricket team
- Rana Tanveer Hussain, politician of PML-N & Federal Minister
- Saeed Anwar played three Olympics for Pakistan hockey team
- Sheikh Salim Chishti, Sufi saint of the Chishti Order during the Mughal Empire
- Sher Akbar Khan, politician and former MPA PP-142 Pakistan Tehreek-e-Insaf
- Waris Shah, Punjabi Sufi poet
- Zaka Ullah Bhangoo, Pakistani army aviator
- Zia Ullah Khan, Commander of XII Corps Quetta
- Zulfiqar Ahmad Dhillon, retired brigadier in the Pakistani army.
- Gulshan Bawra, Indian song writer

== See also ==
- Hiran Minar, minaret built in the early 17th century
- Sheikhupura Stadium
- Sharaqpur Sharif
- Farooqabad
- Kot Abdul Malik
- Quaid-e-Azam Business Park Sheikhupura
- Deg outfall hydropower project Sheikhupura
- Jinnah Park
- Landa Bazar
