= 1687 =

1687 in various calendars
- Gregorian calendar: 1687; MDCLXXXVII
- Ab urbe condita: 2440
- Armenian calendar: 1136; ԹՎ ՌՃԼԶ
- Assyrian calendar: 6437
- Balinese saka calendar: 1608–1609
- Bengali calendar: 1093–1094
- Berber calendar: 2637
- English Regnal year: 2 Ja. 2 – 3 Ja. 2
- Buddhist calendar: 2231
- Burmese calendar: 1049
- Byzantine calendar: 7195–7196
- Chinese calendar: 丙寅年 (Fire Tiger); 4384 or 4177 — to — 丁卯年 (Fire Rabbit); 4385 or 4178
- Coptic calendar: 1403–1404
- Discordian calendar: 2853
- Ethiopian calendar: 1679–1680
- Hebrew calendar: 5447–5448
- Hindu calendars
- Vikram Samvat: 1743–1744
- Shaka Samvat: 1608–1609
- Kali Yuga: 4787–4788
- Holocene calendar: 11687
- Igbo calendar: 687–688
- Iranian calendar: 1065–1066
- Islamic calendar: 1098–1099
- Japanese calendar: Jōkyō 4 (貞享４年)
- Javanese calendar: 1610–1611
- Julian calendar: Gregorian minus 10 days
- Korean calendar: 4020
- Minguo calendar: 225 before ROC 民前225年
- Nanakshahi calendar: 219
- Thai solar calendar: 2229–2230
- Tibetan calendar: མེ་ཕོ་སྟག་ལོ་ (male Fire-Tiger); 1813 or 1432 or 660 — to — མེ་མོ་ཡོས་ལོ་ (female Fire-Hare); 1814 or 1433 or 661

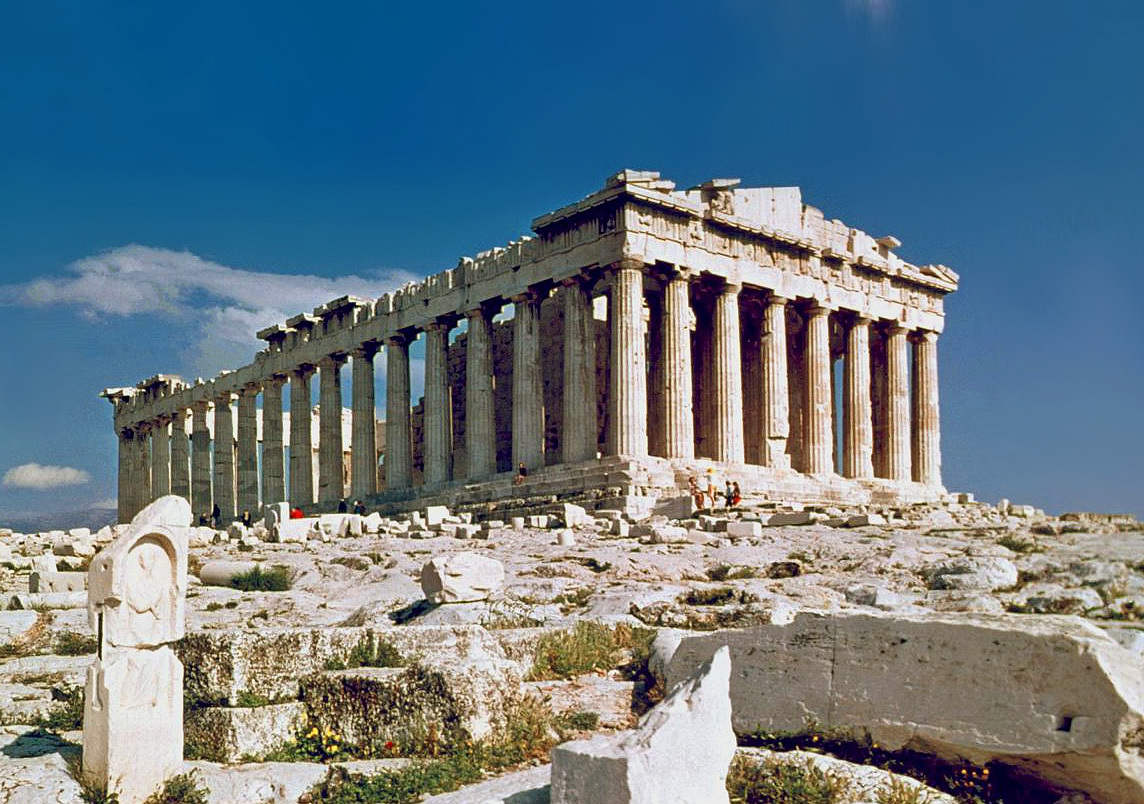
September 26: The 2,000-year-old Parthenon in Athens is ruined by shelling from the Navy of the Republic of Venice.

1687 (MDCLXXXVII) was a common year starting on Wednesday of the Gregorian calendar and a common year starting on Saturday of the Julian calendar, the 1687th year of the Common Era (CE) and Anno Domini (AD) designations, the 687th year of the 2nd millennium, the 87th year of the 17th century, and the 8th year of the 1680s decade. As of the start of 1687, the Gregorian calendar was 10 days ahead of the Julian calendar, which remained in localized use until 1923.

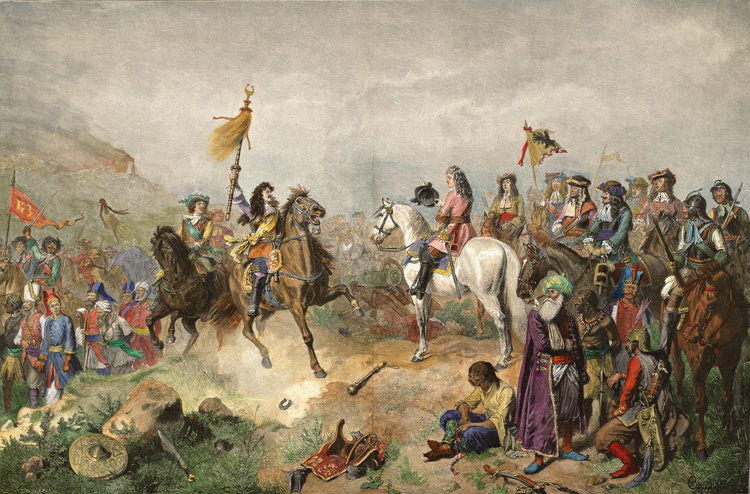
August 12: Battle of Mohács.

== Events ==
=== January–March ===
- January 3 – With the end of latest of the Savoyard–Waldensian wars in the Duchy of Savoy between the Savoyard government and Protestant Italians known as the Waldensians, Victor Amadeus II, Duke of Savoy, carries out the release of 3,847 surviving prisoners and their families, who had forcibly been converted to Catholicism, and permits the group to emigrate to Switzerland.
- January 8 – Richard Talbot, 1st Earl of Tyrconnell, is appointed as the last Lord Deputy of Ireland by the English crown, and begins efforts to include more Roman Catholic Irishmen in the administration. Upon the removal of King James II in England and Scotland, the Earl of Tyrconnell loses his job and is replaced by James, who reigns briefly as King of Ireland until William III establishes his rule over the isle.
- January 27 – In one of the most sensational cases in England in the 17th century, midwife Mary Hobry murders her abusive husband, Denis Hobry, after he beats her up for the last time. Mary then dismembers his body and scatters the remains in a dunghill and in several outhouses (or privies) in the area. Despite a defense of justifiable homicide, Mary is convicted of murder and burned at the stake.
- February 7 – The Arjeplog blasphemy trial begins for Erik Eskilsson and Amund Thorsson, two practitioners of the Sami religion who had resisted Sweden's efforts at their conversion to Christianity. Eskilsson and Thorsson are acquitted of the charges after agreeing to convert to Christianity.
- February 11 – In India, troops under the command of Job Charnock of the East India Company, preparing to go to war against the Nawab of Bengal, Shaista Khan of the Mughal empire, destroy his fortresses located at Thana.
- February 12 – The Declaration of Indulgence is issued in Scotland by King James VII as one of the first steps in establishing freedom of religion in the British Isles, eliminating enforcement of criminal penalties against persons who failed to conform with Anglicanism. As King James II of England, he issues a similar declaration on April 4.
- March 19 – The men under explorer Robert Cavelier, Sieur de La Salle mutiny, while searching for the mouth of the Mississippi River. Pierre Duhaut murders La Salle, near what is now Navasota, Texas.

=== April–June ===
- April 4 – King James II of England issues the Declaration of Indulgence (or Declaration for the Liberty of Conscience), suspending laws against Roman Catholics and nonconformists.
- April 23 – Ignatius George II becomes Syriac Orthodox Patriarch of Antioch (or April 22).
- April 26 – The Spanish city of Guayaquil (now part of Ecuador) is attacked and looted by English and French pirates under the command of George Hout (English), Pierre Le Picard and Francois Groniet (French). Of more than 260 pirates, 35 are killed and 46 were wounded; 75 defenders of the city died and more than 100 are wounded.
- May 6 – Emperor Higashiyama succeeds Emperor Reigen, on the throne of Japan.
- June 14 – In one of the few actions on land in the Anglo-Siamese War, English sailors on the coast of Mergui in Burma (now Myeik, Myanmar) are massacred by Siamese troops.

=== July–September ===
- July 2 – King James II of England disbands the English parliament
- July 11 – Isaac Newton's Philosophiæ Naturalis Principia Mathematica, known as the Principia, is published by the Royal Society of London. In it, Newton describes his law of universal gravitation, explains the laws of mechanics, and gives a formula for the speed of sound. The writing of Principia Mathematica ushers in a tidal wave of changes in thought, significantly accelerating the Scientific Revolution by providing new and practical intellectual tools, and becomes the foundation of modern physics.
- July 24 – Morean War: Battle of Patras – The Republic of Venice defeats the Ottomans, which flee in panic, allowing the Venetians to capture the fortresses of Patras, Rio, Antirrio, and Lepanto unopposed.
- August 12 – Great Turkish War: Battle of Mohács – The Habsburg imperial army, and allies under Charles V, Duke of Lorraine, defeat the Ottoman Turks, and enable Austria to conquer most of Ottoman-occupied Hungary.
- September 21 – Morean War: The navy of the Republic of Venice raids the Dalmatian coast, and attacks Ottoman Turkish strongholds in Greece.
- September 22 – The Siege of Golconda, ordered by Emperor Aurangzeb of India's Mughal Empire against the capital of the Golconda sultanate, ends after nine months when a traitor inside the walled city, Sarandaz Khan, opens the first of several entrances into the fortress. The Sultan Abul Hasan Qutb Shah is taken prisoner by General Mir Shahab ud-Din, and Golconda (now part of Hyderabad in the Telangana state).
- September 26 – Half of the Parthenon is destroyed in Athens after mortar shells are fired by Republic of Venice forces under the command of Francesco Morosini in a battle against the Ottoman Empire for control of the city. The strike ignites a stock of gunpowder that the Ottomans had stored inside the 2,200-year-old temple, which had been completed in 438 BC as a shrine to the goddess Athena. During the fighting September 23 and September 29 for control of the Acropolis in the Morean War, the Temple of Athena Nike is demolished and the Propylaea suffers damage.

=== October–December ===
- October 20 – An estimated 8.7 magnitude earthquake strikes 50 kilometres (31 mi) off of the coast of Peru and kills at least 5,000 people, primarily from a tsunami that washes away the city of Pisco and causes severe damage to the Spanish colonial cities of Lima, Callao and Ica.
- October 31 – The legend of the Charter Oak begins as a successful attempt to hide the 1662 Royal Charter of the British colony (and now a U.S. state) of Connecticut after Edmund Andros, the Governor of the Dominion of New England, makes a mission of attempting to confiscate the founding documents for the seven colonies that make up the new administrative area. After Governor Andros arrives in Hartford and comes to the tavern of Zachariah Sanford to demand the Connecticut Colony charter, Captain Joseph Wadsworth spirits the parchment away from the and hides the Charter in a hollowed out portion of a white oak tree on Wyllys Hyll until Andros is recalled to London.
- November 5 – An annular solar eclipse is visible from Arabia across the Indian Ocean and across the south of Australia
- November 8 – Suleiman II succeeds the deposed Mehmed IV, as Ottoman Emperor.
- December 31 – In response to the revocation of the Edict of Nantes in 1685, a group of Huguenots set sail from France, and settle in the recently established Dutch colony at the Cape of Good Hope, where, using their native skills, they establish the first South African vineyards.

== Births ==
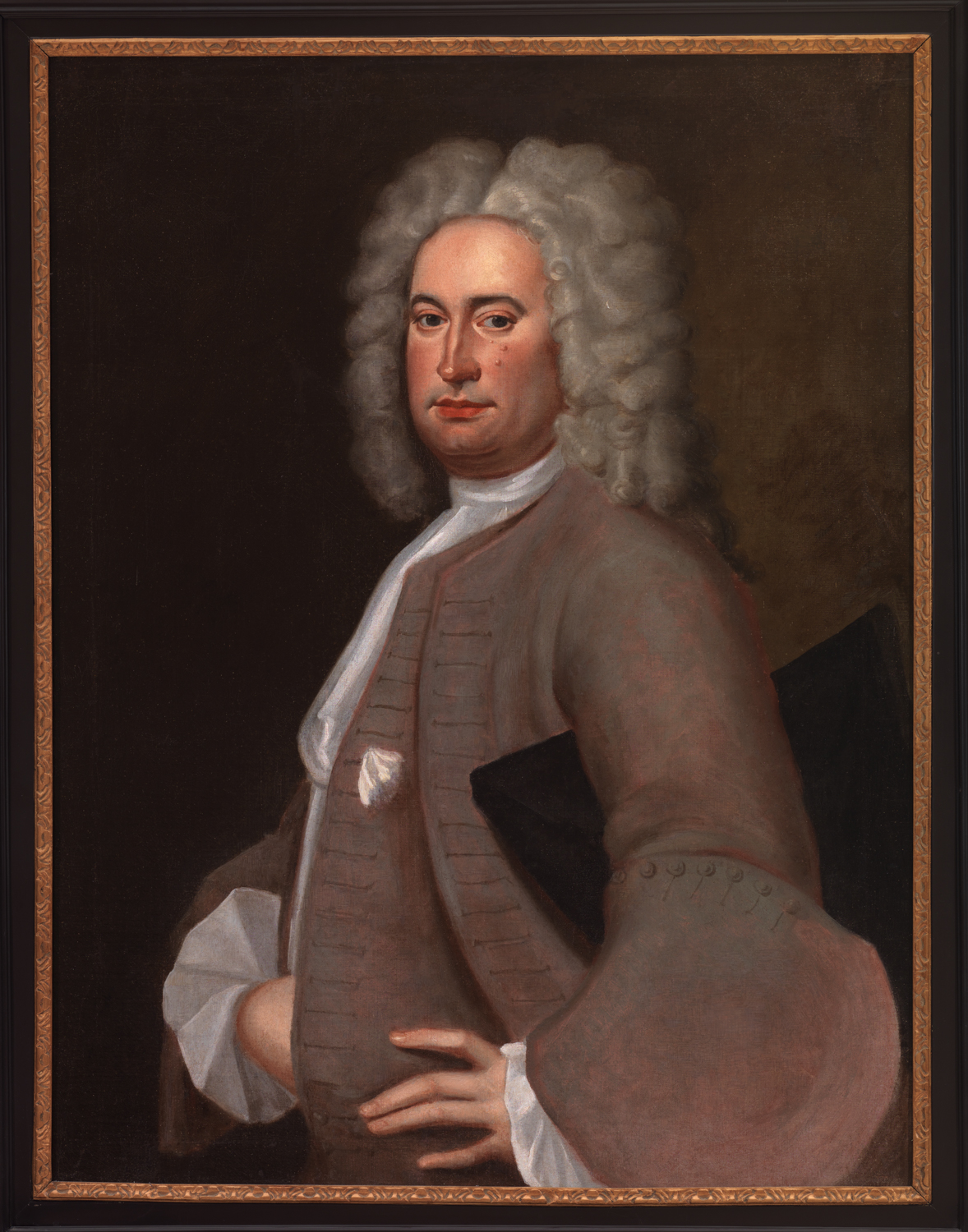
Isham Randolph of Dungeness born 24 February

Elizabeth Churchill, Countess of Bridgewater born 15 March

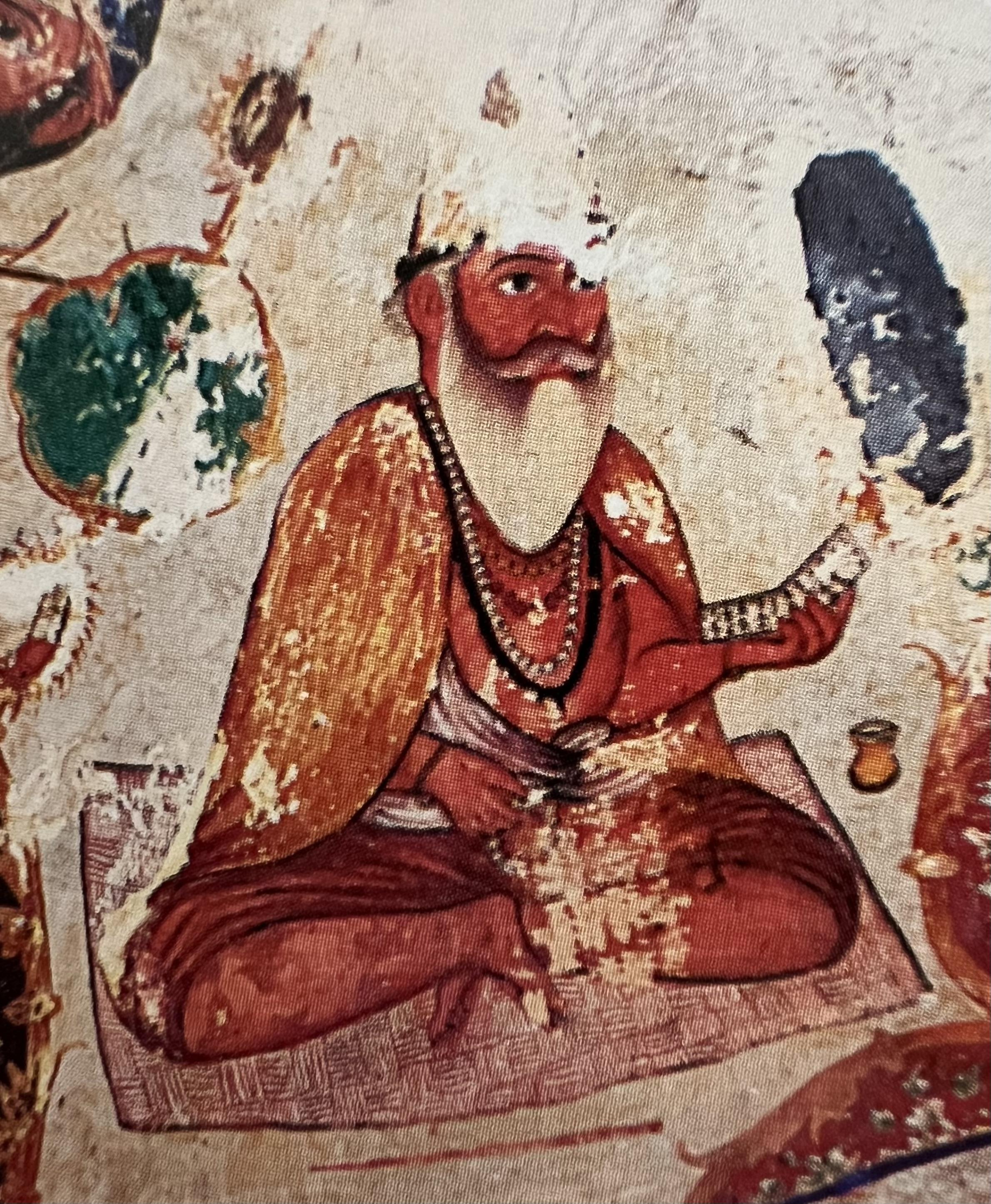
Bhumman Shah born 14 April

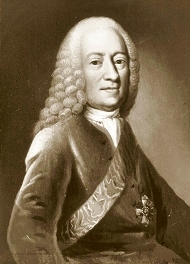
Jean Henri Desmercières born 8 May

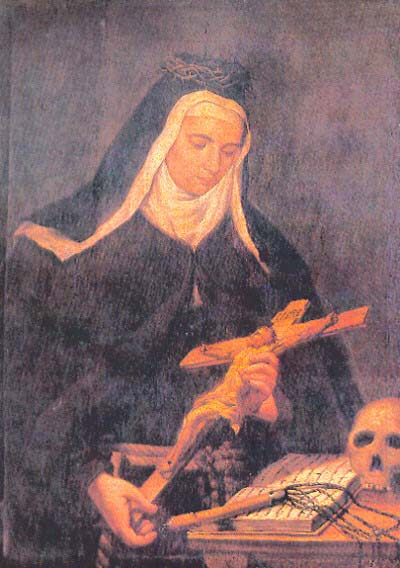
Maria Maddalena Martinengo born 5 October

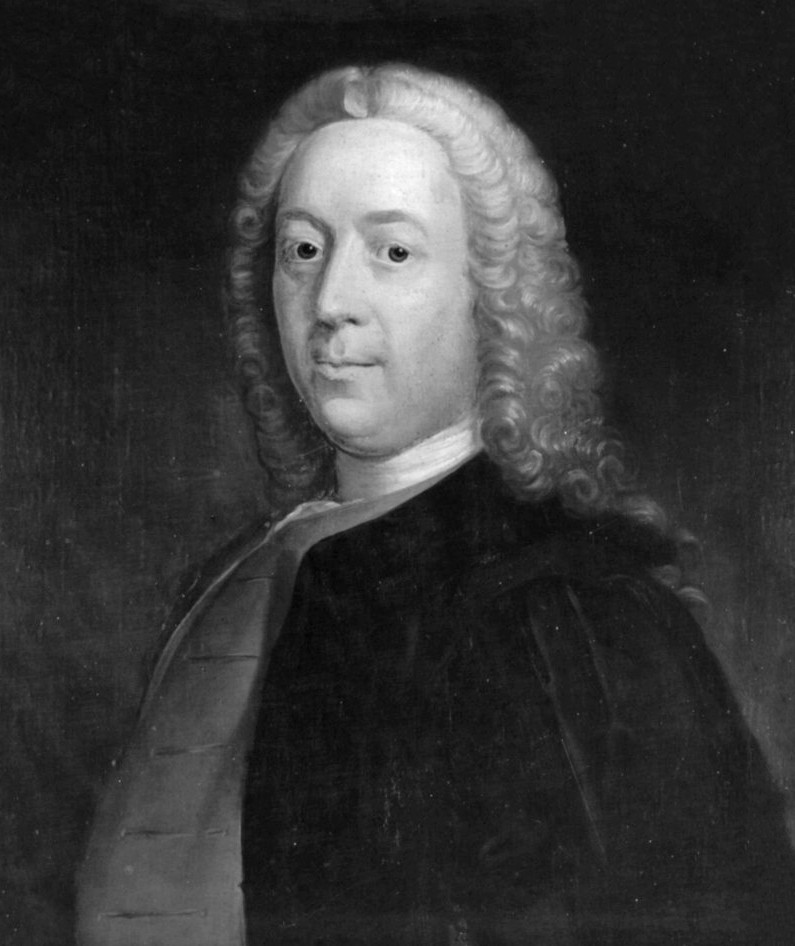
Robert Simson born 14 October

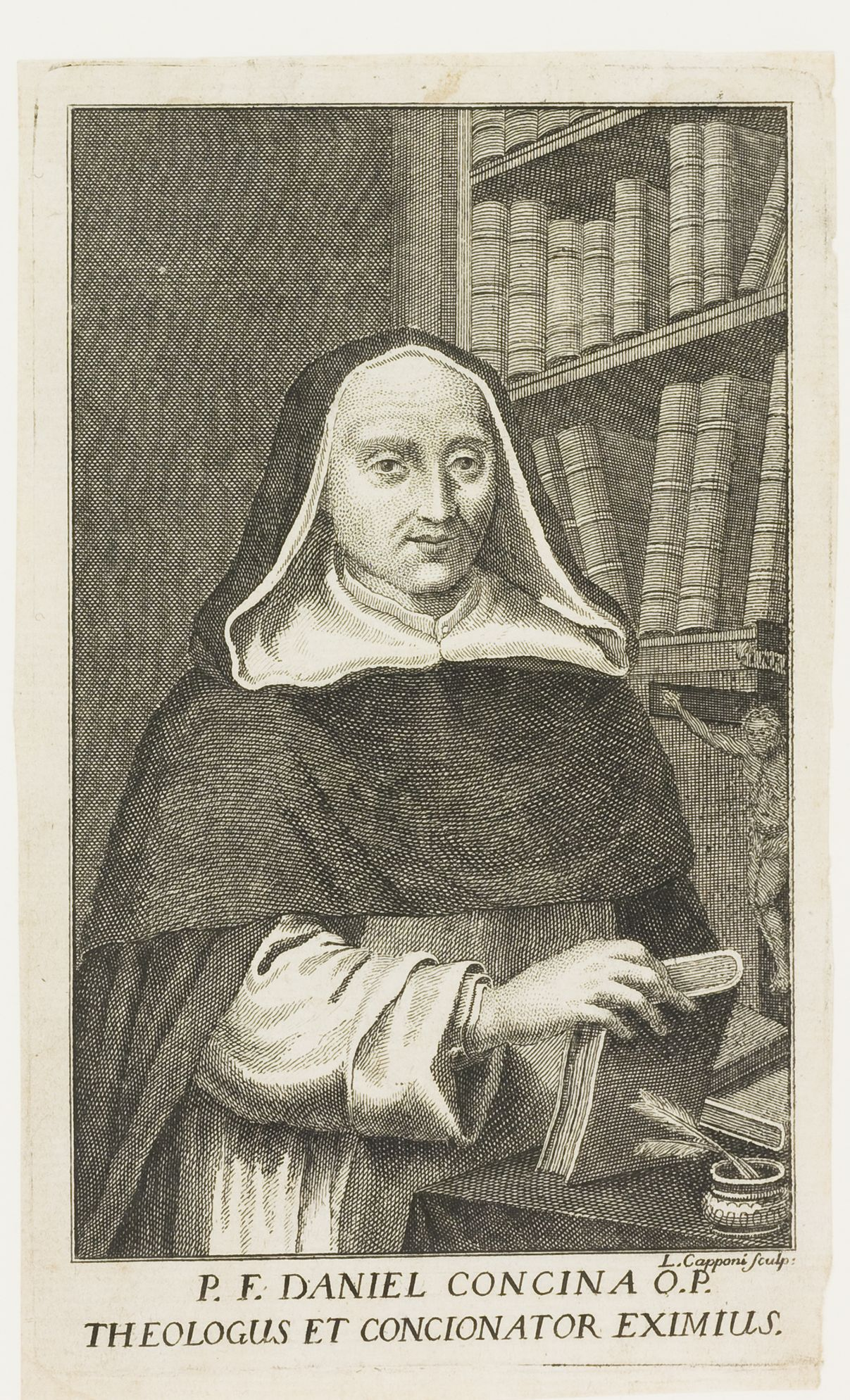
Daniello Concina born 20 October

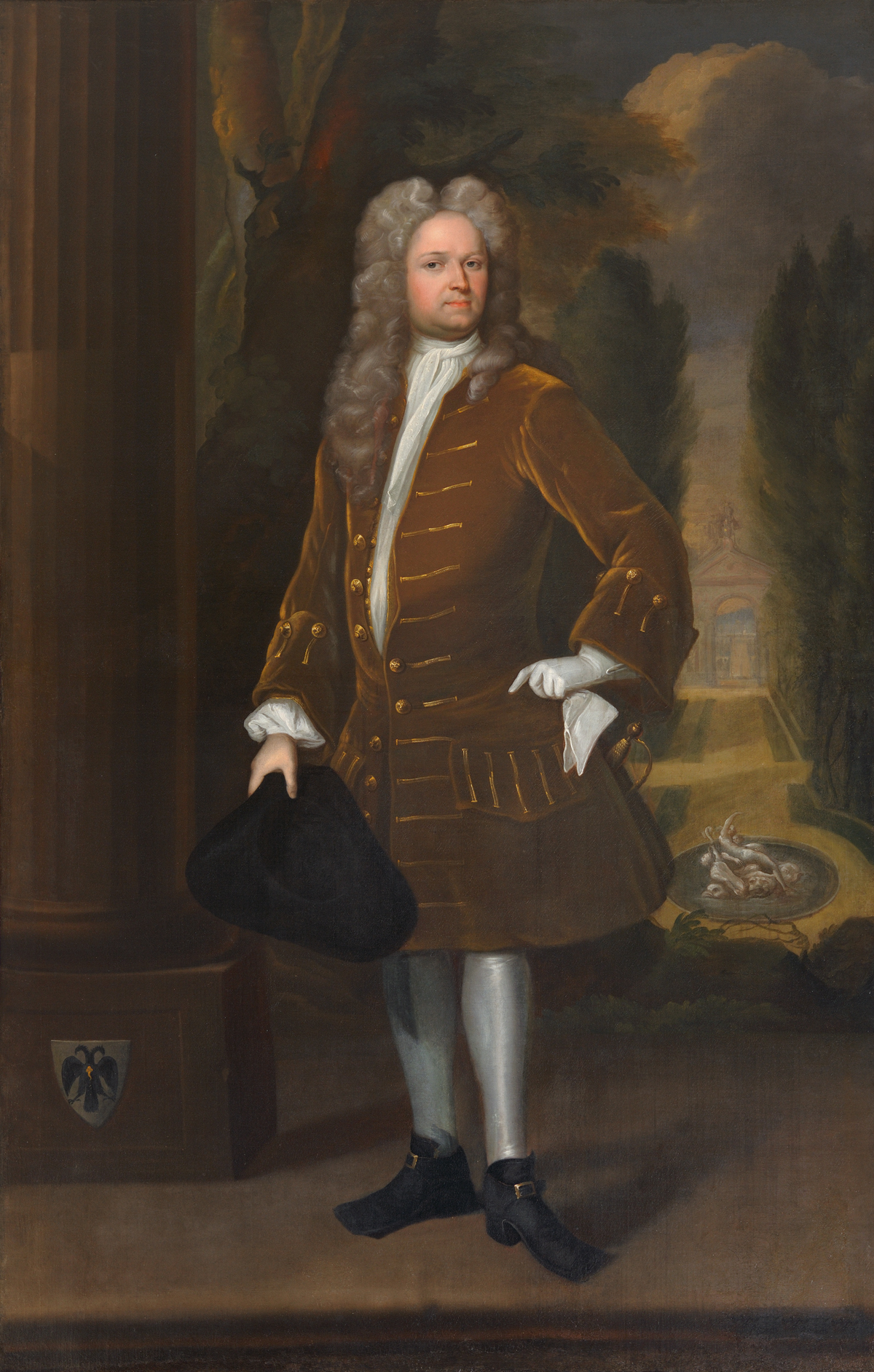
William Stukeley born 7 November

=== January–March ===
- January 4 – Henry Beekman, politician and landowner from the Thirteen Colonies (d. 1775)
- January 6 – Cornil Cacheux, French pipe organ maker (d. 1738)
- January 8 – Bernardo de Rossi, Italian Dominican theologian and historian (d. 1775)
- January 19 – Sebastián de la Cuadra, 1st Marquess of Villarías, Spanish statesman (d. 1759)
- January 24 – Sir Banks Jenkinson, 4th Baronet, British lawyer and politician (d. 1738)
- January 27 – Johann Balthasar Neumann, German architect (d. 1753)
- January 31 – Cornelis Schrijver, Dutch States Navy officer and diplomat (d. 1768)
- February 4 – Joseph Effner, German architect (d. 1745)
- February 6 – Sir Nicholas Carew, 1st Baronet, landowner and Whig politician (d. 1727)
- February 15 – Philippe Charles de La Fare, a Marshal of France (d. 1752)
- February 21 – Prince William of Denmark, son of Christian V of Denmark and Charlotte Amalie of Hesse-Kassel (d. 1705)
- February 23 – Gustaf Otto Douglas, Swedish mercenary of Scottish descent (d. 1771)
- February 24 – Isham Randolph of Dungeness, American planter (d. 1742)
- March 3 – Peter Stephens, founded present-day Stephens City, Virginia, U.S. (d. 1757)
- March 7 – Jean Lebeuf, French historian (d. 1760)
- March 13
  - John Ashburnham, 1st Earl of Ashburnham, English peer (d. 1737)
  - Giovanni Giacinto Sbaraglia, historian of the Franciscan Order (d. 1764)
- March 15
  - Jacques-François de Chambray, French knight of Malta (d. 1756)
  - Elizabeth Churchill, Countess of Bridgewater (d. 1714)
  - Jerzy Ignacy Lubomirski, Polish nobleman (szlachcic) (d. 1753)
- March 16
  - Sophia Dorothea of Hanover, queen consort of Frederick William I (d. 1757)
  - Anton Moro, Italian abbot (d. 1764)
- March 24 – James Parker, American innkeeper and figure of the American Indian Wars (d. 1732)

=== April–June ===
- April 5 – William Walmesley, Dean of Lichfield (d. 1730)
- April 13 – Sigismund Streit, Kingdom of Prussia merchant and art patron in Venice (d. 1775)
- April 14
  - Sir Thomas Samwell, 2nd Baronet, British politician (d. 1757)
  - Bhumman Shah, Udasi saint (d. 1762)
- April 19 – Charles-Philippe de Patin, prominent figure in the Austrian Netherlands (d. 1773)
- April 30 – Pedro Cebrián, 5th Count of Fuenclara (d. 1752)
- May 2 – James Compton, 5th Earl of Northampton (d. 1754)
- May 3 – Peter Bathurst, Salisbury MP (d. 1748)
- May 8 – Jean Henri Desmercières, French-Danish merchant (d. 1778)
- May 12 – Johann Heinrich Schulze, German professor and polymath (d. 1744)
- May 15 – Thomas Prince, New England clergyman (d. 1758)
- May 25 – Sir Edward Crofton, 3rd Baronet, Anglo-Irish politician (d. 1739)
- June 6 – Giambattista Pittoni, Venetian painter of the late Baroque or Rococo period (d. 1767)
- June 7 – Gaetano Berenstadt, Italian alto castrato who is associated with George Frideric Handel (d. 1734)
- June 13 – Paolo Rolli, Italian Rococo librettist, poet and translator (d. 1765)
- June 18 – Frederick William II, Duke of Schleswig-Holstein-Sonderburg-Beck (d. 1749)
- June 24 – Johann Albrecht Bengel, German scholar (d. 1752)
- June 25 – Elias David Häusser, German-Danish architect working in the Baroque and Rococo styles (d. 1745)

=== July–September ===
- July 4 – John Cochrane, 4th Earl of Dundonald, Scottish aristocrat and politician (d. 1720)
- July 20 – Sir Justinian Isham, 5th Baronet (d. 1772)
- July 21 – Lars Benzon, landowner, Deputy Director in the General Affairs Commission of the Danish Royal Navy (d. 1742)
- July 24 – Henry Parsons, English politician (d. 1739)
- August 1 – Robert Furnese, 2nd Baronet and English Whig politician (d. 1733)
- August 23 – Mattheus Pinna da Encarnaçao, Brazilian Benedictine writer and theologian (d. 1764)
- August 27 – Lucius Cary, 6th Viscount Falkland, Scottish peer and Jacobite (d. 1730)
- September 4 – Isaak Faesch, Swiss merchant (d. 1758)
- September 7
  - Herbert Mackworth, Welsh landowner (d. 1765)
  - Durastante Natalucci, Italian historian (d. 1772)
- September 9 – Jean-Baptiste-Maurice Quinault, French actor and musician (d. 1745)
- September 17 – Durastante Natalucci, Italian historian who specialized in history of Trevi (d. 1772)
- September 23 – Fettiplace Bellers, English dramatist and philosophical writer (d. 1742)
- September 28 – Adam Christopher Knuth, first Count of Knuthenborg (d. 1736)

=== October–December ===
- October 4 – Robert Simson, Scottish mathematician (d. 1768)
- October 5 – Maria Maddalena Martinengo, Italian nun (d. 1737)
- October 13 – Giorgio Massari, Italian late-Baroque architect from Venice (d. 1766)
- October 14 – Robert Simson, Scottish mathematician and Professor of Mathematics (d. 1768)
- October 16 – Henry Frederick of Württemberg-Winnental, German general (d. 1734)
- October 18 – Charles III Le Moyne, second baron de Longueuil (d. 1755)
- October 20 – Daniello Concina, Italian Dominican preacher, controversialist and theologian (d. 1756)
- October 21 – Nicolaus I Bernoulli, Swiss mathematician (d. 1759)
- October 22 – Anton Ulrich, Duke of Saxe-Meiningen (d. 1763)
- October 24 – Queen Inwon, wife and fourth queen consort of Yi Sun, King Sukjong, the 19th Joseon monarch (d. 1757)
- November 4 – Henry Howard, 11th Earl of Suffolk, English peer from the Howard family (d. 1757)
- November 7 – William Stukeley, English archaeologist (d. 1765)
- November 23
  - Henry Bull, colonial attorney and politician in Rhode Island (d. 1774)
  - Jean-Baptiste Senaillé, French Baroque composer and violin virtuoso (d. 1730)
- November 24 – Giovanni Battista Scaramelli, Italian Jesuit (d. 1752)
- November 26 – Richard Russell, doctor (d. 1759)
- November 30 – Juan José Navarro, 1st Marquess of Victoria (d. 1772)
- December 5 – Francesco Geminiani, Italian violinist and composer (d. 1762)
- December 8 – Thomas Emmanuel, Prince of Savoy-Carignan (d. 1729)
- December 9 – Antonio Ferrante Gonzaga, reigning Duke of Guastalla, member of the House of Gonzaga (d. 1729)
- December 21 – Sir Andrew Agnew, 5th Baronet (d. 1771)
- December 24 – Richard Hancorne, Welsh clergyman (d. 1732)
- December 26 – Johann Georg Pisendel, German musician (d. 1755)
- December 28 – John Bligh, 1st Earl of Darnley, Irish peer born of an English family (d. 1728)
- December 29 – Jean-Baptiste Massé, French miniature painter (d. 1767)
- December 30 – Joseph Whipple Jr., wealthy merchant in the Colony of Rhode Island and Providence Plantations (d. 1750)
- date unknown
  - Gabriel de Clieu, French naval officer and governor of Guadeloupe (1737-1752) (d. 1774)
  - Shahzada Assadullah Khan Abdali, Persian Governor of Herat (d. 1720)

== Deaths ==
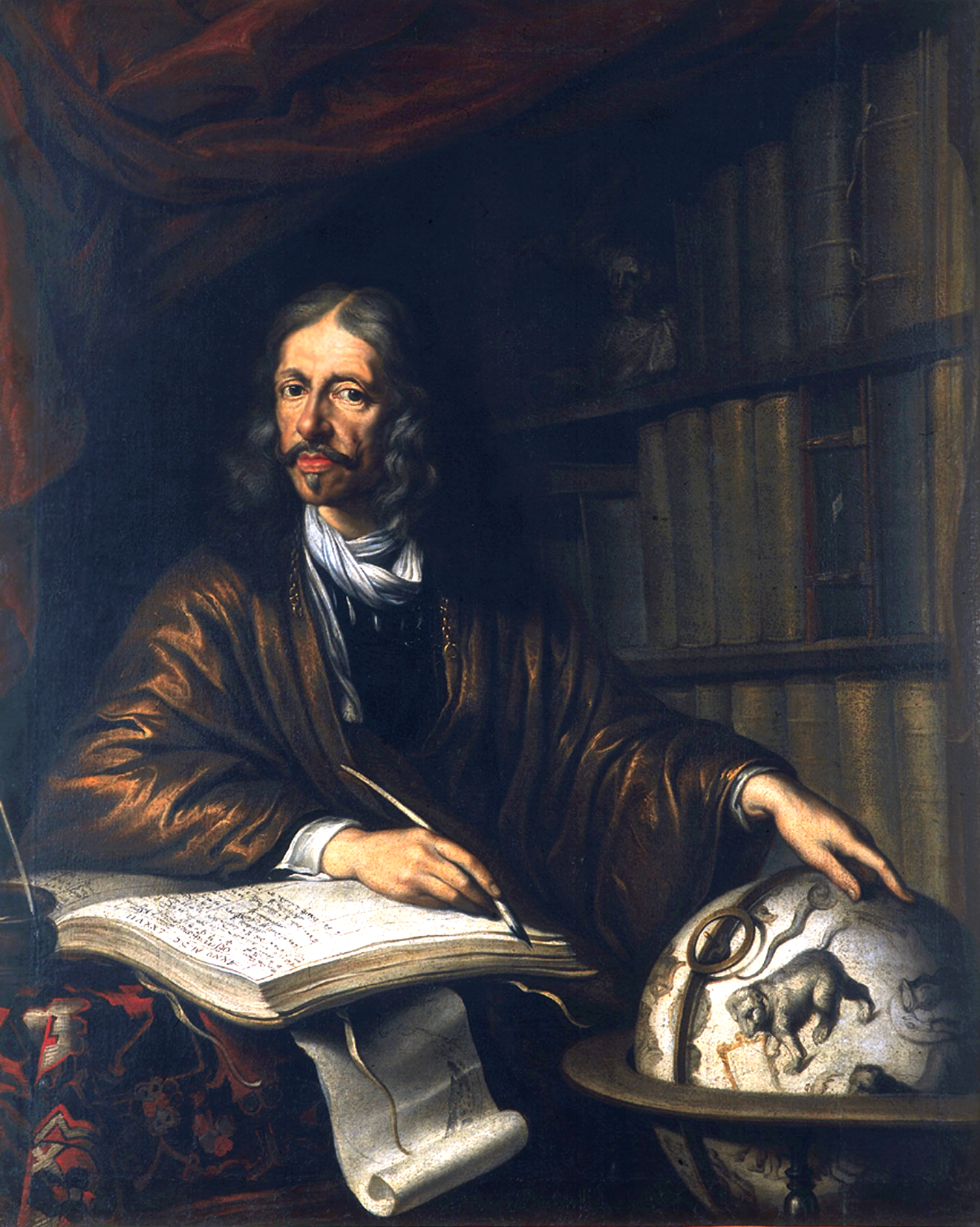
Johannes Hevelius died 28 January

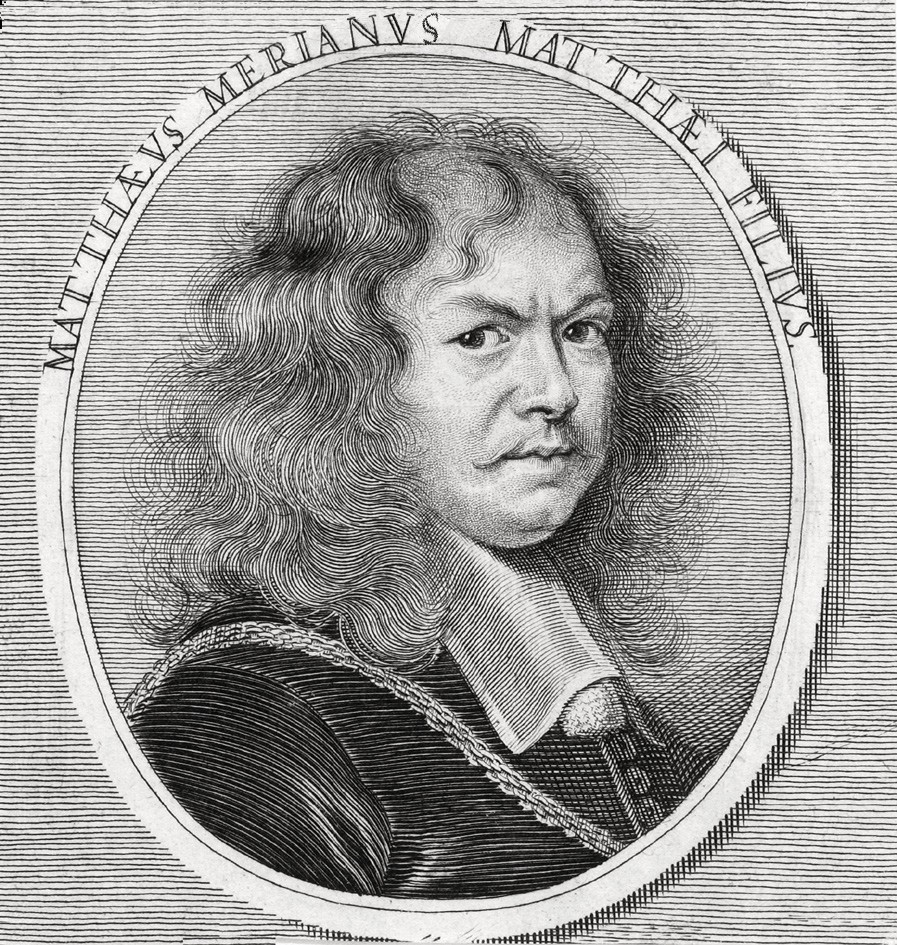
Matthäus Merian the Younger died 15 February

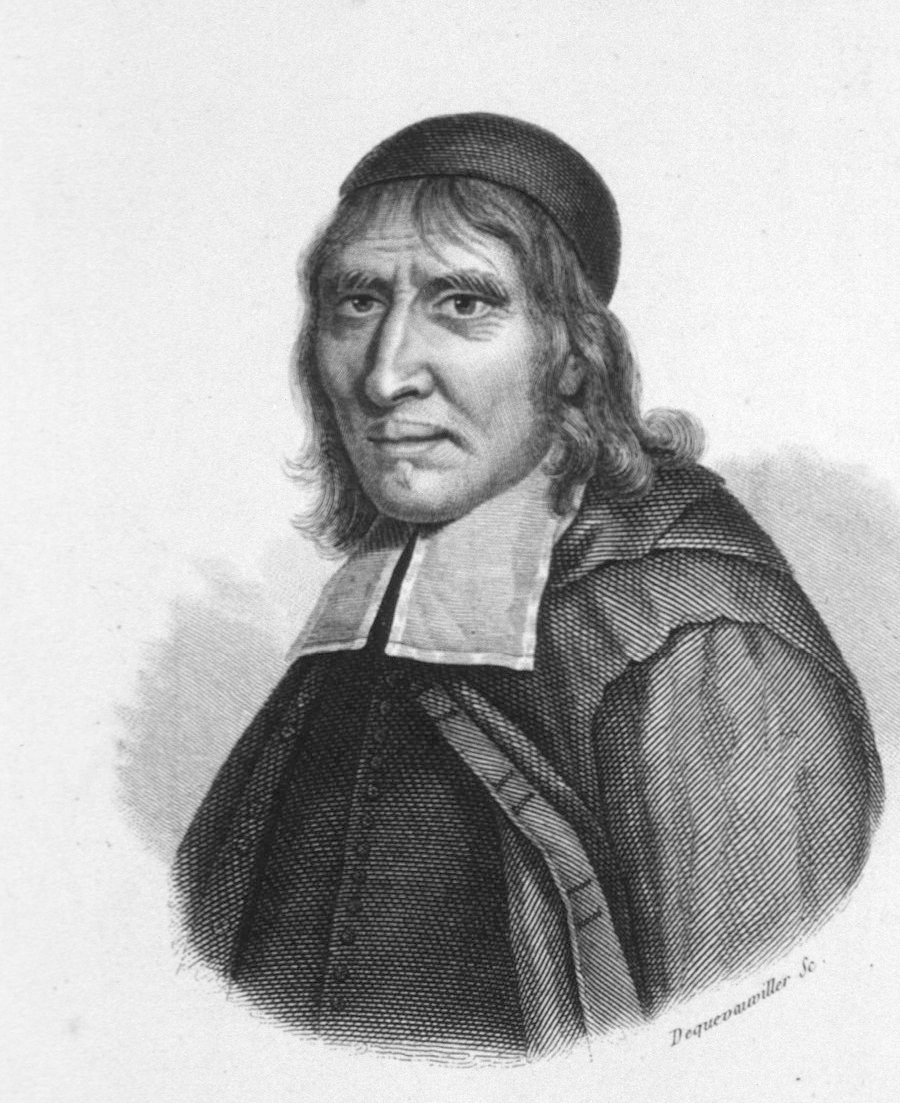
Jean Hamon (doctor) died 22 February

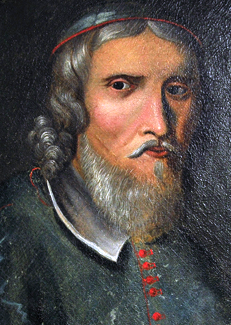
Stefan Wierzbowski died 7 March

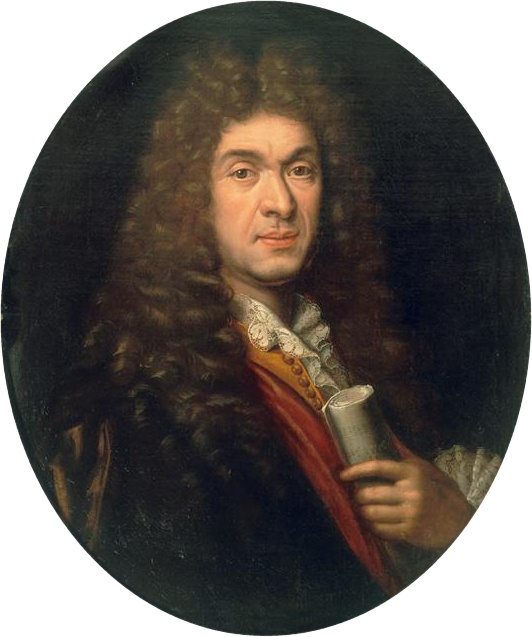
Jean-Baptiste Lully died 22 March

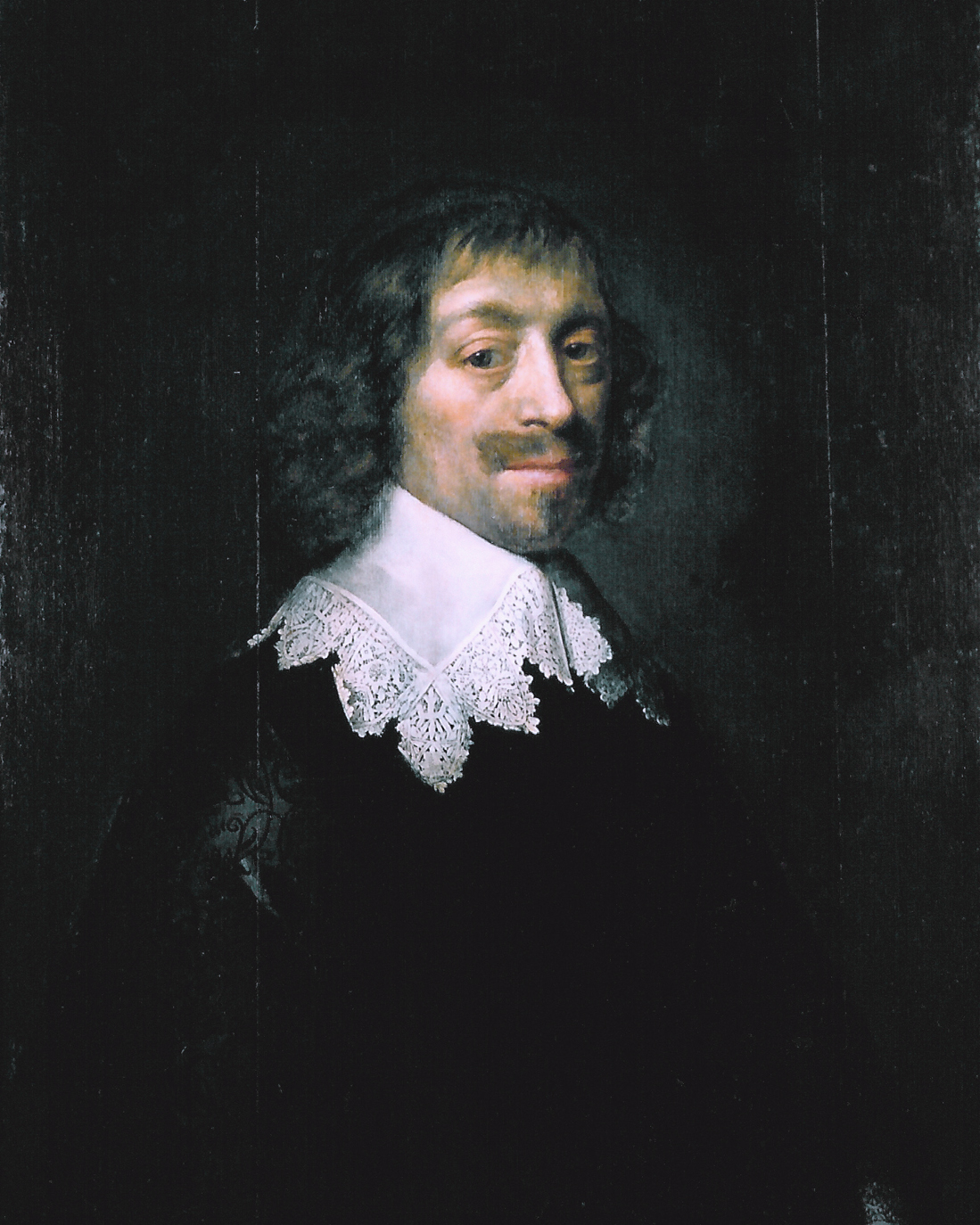
Constantijn Huygens died 28 March

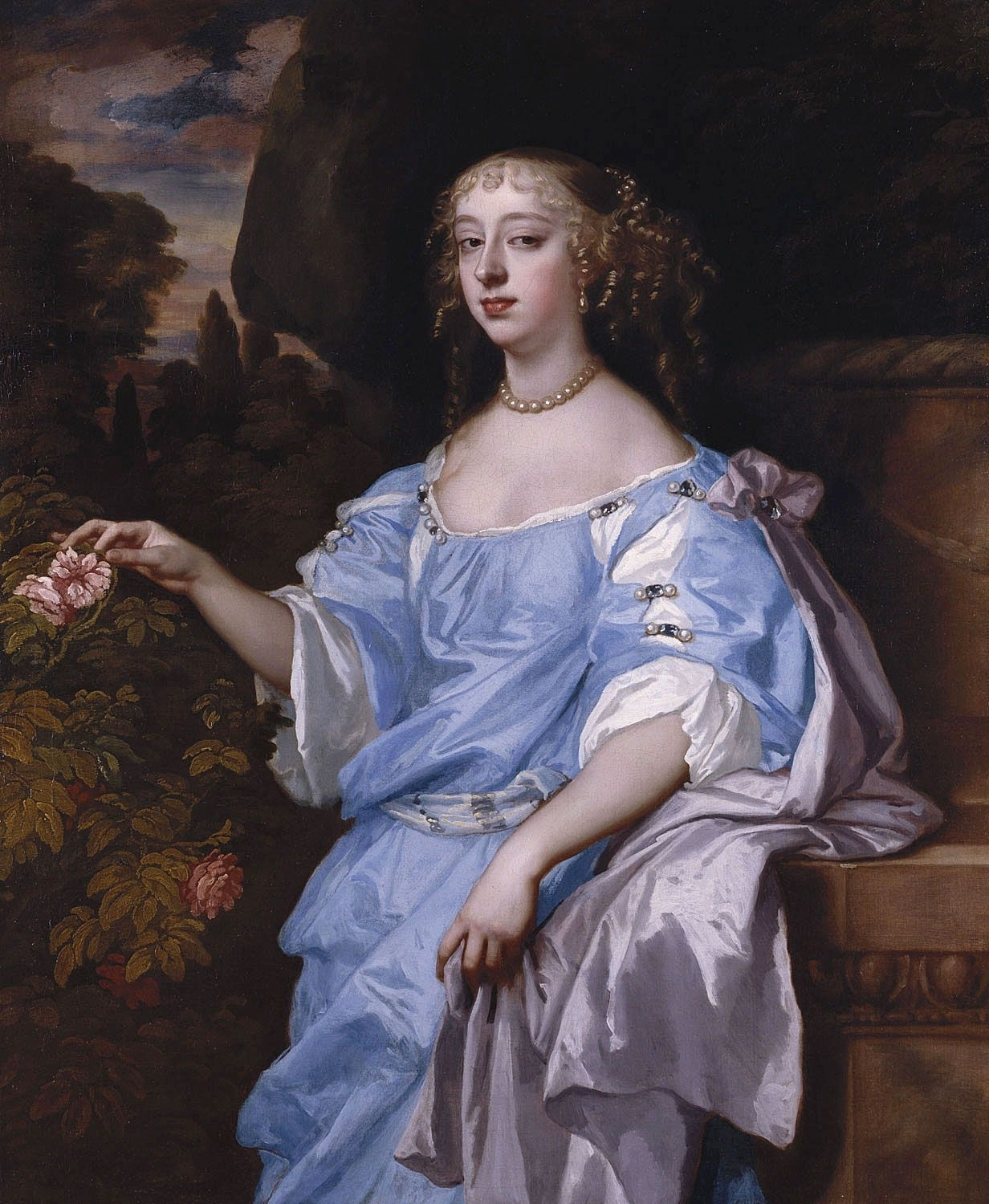
Henrietta Hyde, Countess of Rochester died 12 April

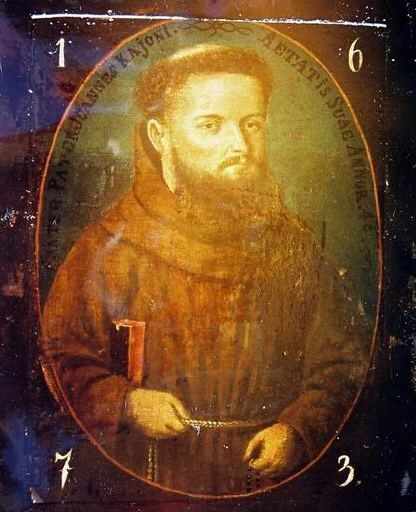
Johannes Caioni died 25 April

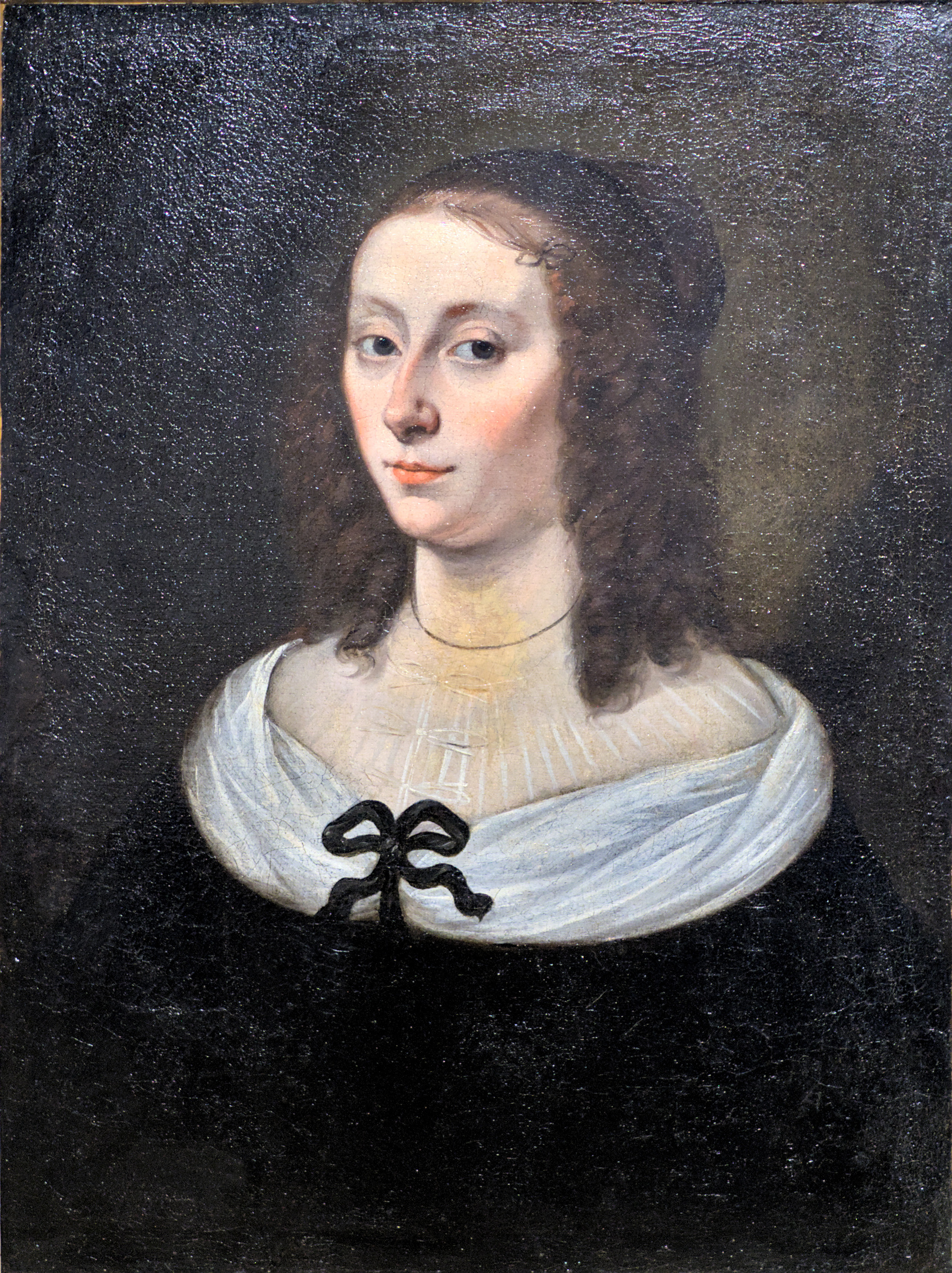
Gilberte Périer died 25 April

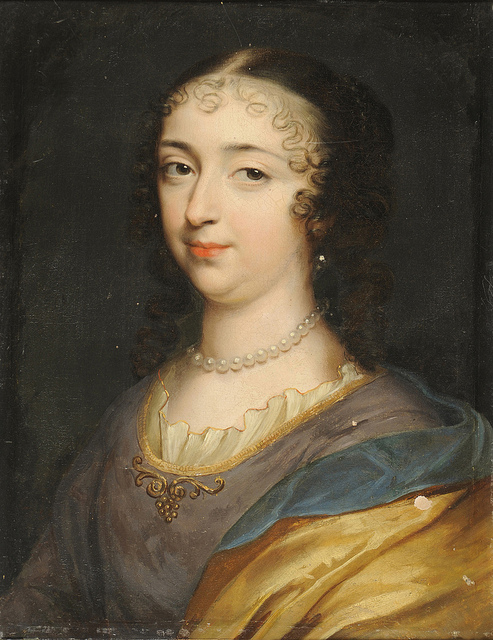
Laura Martinozzi died 19 July

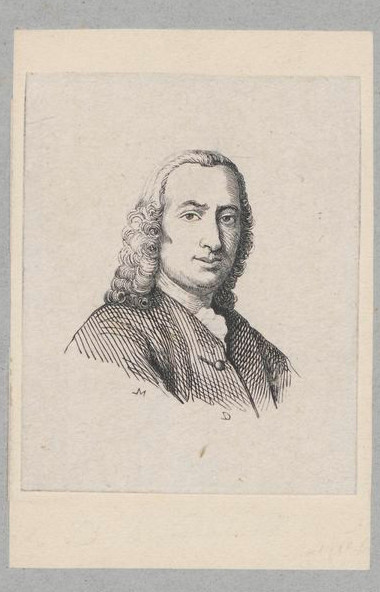
Dirk Dalens died 24 August

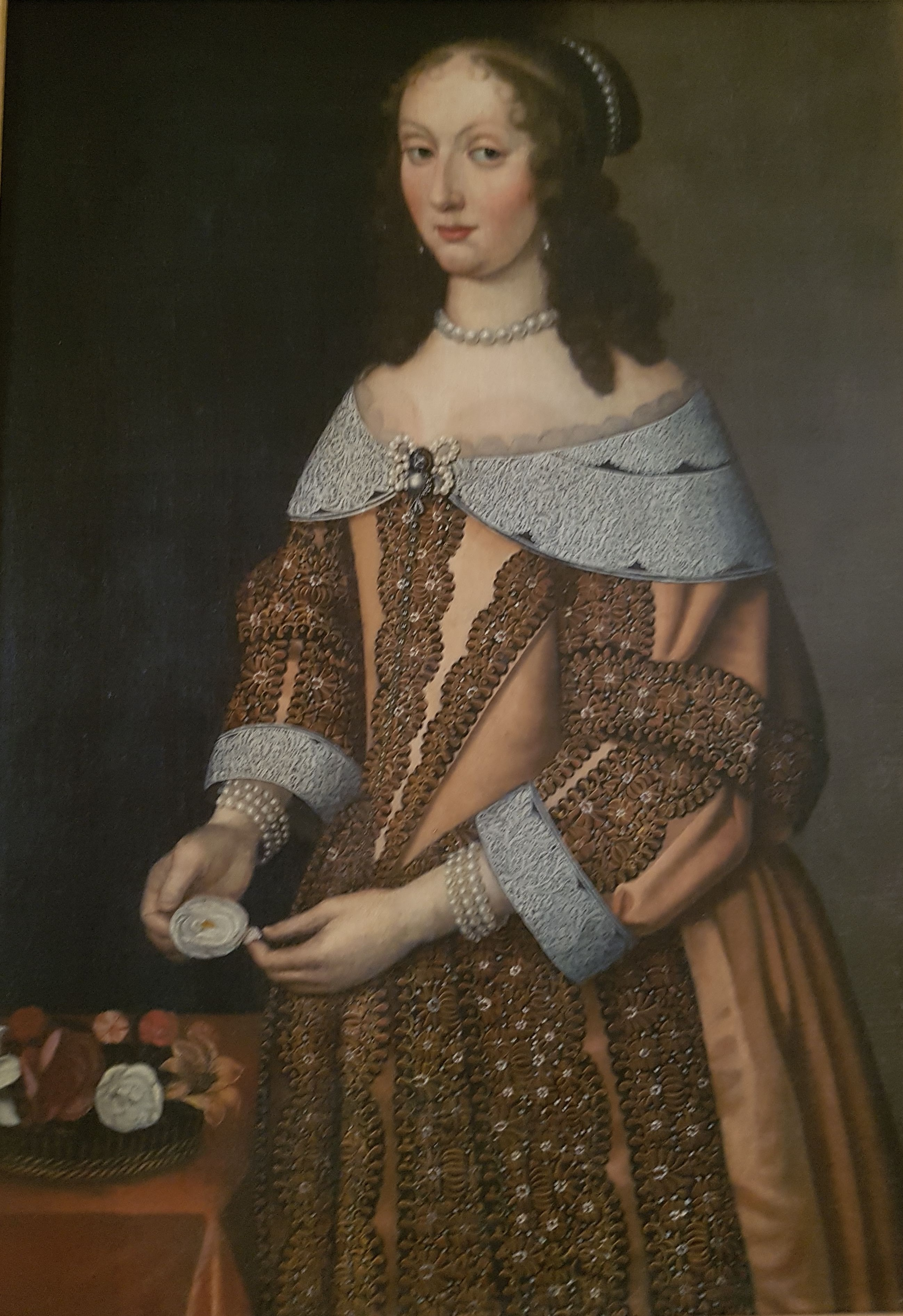
Maria Euphrosyne of Zweibrücken died 24 October

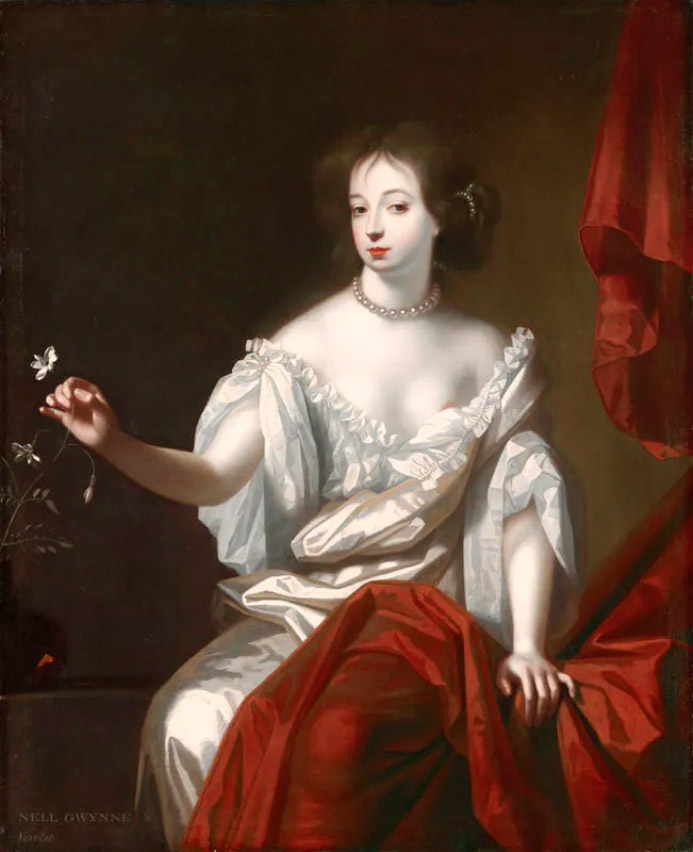
Nell Gwyn died 14 November

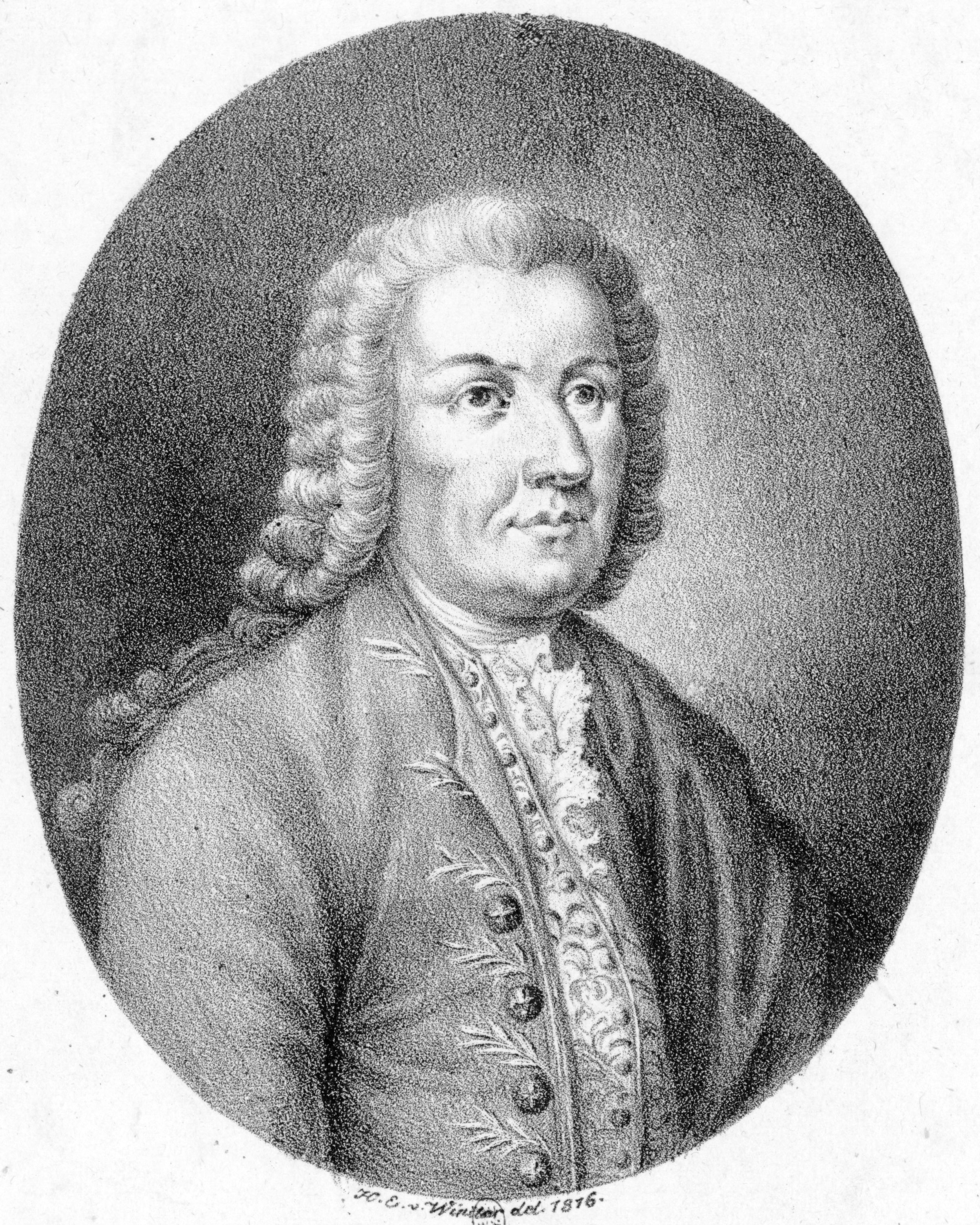
Ercole Bernabei died 5 December

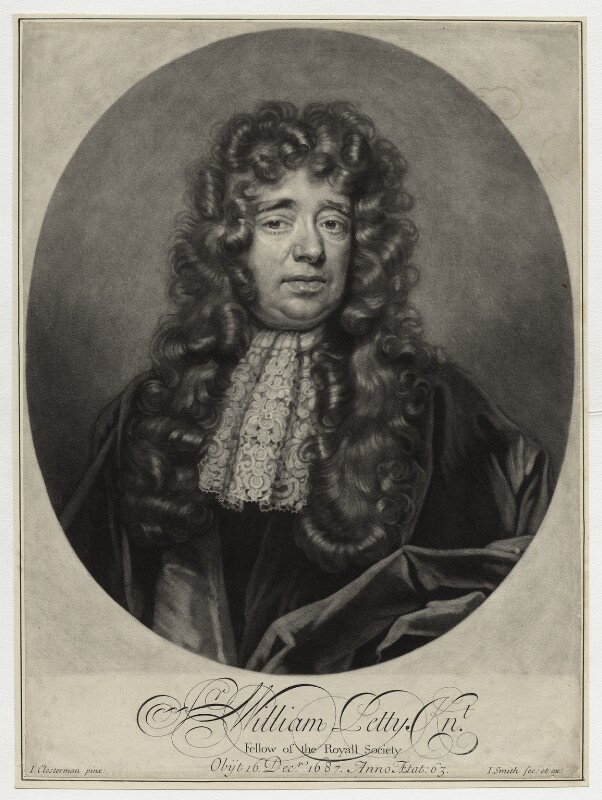
William Petty died 16 December

=== January ===
- January 2 – Palliveettil Chandy, bishop (b. 1615)
- January 3 – Christoph Hartknoch, German historian (b. 1644)
- January 5 – Tada Kasuke, farmer executed for appeal against taxes (b. 1639)
- January 7 – Hyacinthe Serroni, Italian archbishop (b. 1617)
- January 9 – Sir John Norton, 3rd Baronet, English politician (b. 1620)
- January 11 – Richard Atherton, English Member of Parliament (b. 1656)
- January 13
  - Jean Claude, French Protestant clergyman (b. 1619)
  - Sylvester Maurus, Italian theologian (b. 1619)
- January 14 – Lorenzo Raggi, Italian cardinal (b. 1615)
- January 15 – Jacob Esselens, Dutch Golden Age painter (b. 1626)
- January 18 – François Collignon, French printmaker (b. 1610)
- January 26
  - Ōzato Chōryō, sessei of Ryukyu (b. 1647)
  - Elias Moskos, Greek painter (b. 1629)
- January 28 – Johannes Hevelius, Polish astronomer (b. 1611)
- January 30
  - François Annibal II d'Estrées, French diplomat (b. 1623)
  - Cosmana Navarra, Maltese art patron (b. 1599)
- January 31 – Francisco Varo, Spanish Dominican friar and linguist (b. 1627)

=== February ===
- February 3
  - François de Créquy, Marshal of France (b. 1625)
  - Bernhard Keil, painter from Denmark (b. 1624)
  - Cornelis van Quaelberg, Governor of Cape Colony (b. 1623)
- February 4 – Eleonore Sophie of Saxe-Weimar, German noblewoman (b. 1660)
- February 5 – Jean-Baptiste de La Rose, French painter (b. 1612)
- February 6
  - Henry Bedingfield, English politician and lawyer (b. 1632)
  - John of Jesus Hernández y Delgado, Spanish Franciscan friar and mystic (b. 1615)
- February 13
  - Charles III de Créquy, French diplomat (b. 1623)
  - John Lloyd, Vice-Chancellor of Oxford University and Bishop (b. 1638)
- February 15
  - Marie Elisabeth of Brunswick-Wolfenbüttel, German noblewoman (b. 1638)
  - Matthäus Merian the Younger, Swiss engraver and portrait painter (b. 1621)
- February 16 – Charles Cotton, English poet and angler (b. 1630)
- February 22
  - Jean Hamon, French doctor and writer (b. 1618)
  - Kiliaen van Rensselaer, fourth patroon (b. 1657)
- February 24 – Elijah Corlet, American educator (b. 1610)
- February 26
  - Magdalena Elisabeth of Hanau, German noblewoman (b. 1611)
  - Francesco Lana de Terzi, Italian physicist and mathematician (b. 1631)
- February 28 – Ermeni Süleyman Pasha, Ottoman politician and Grand Vizier (b. 1607)

=== March ===
- March 4
  - Gallus Alt, Abbot of St. Gall (b. 1610)
  - John Duncombe, English politician; (b. 1622)
- March 7 – Stefan Wierzbowski, Polish bishop (b. 1620)
- March 11 – Angelo Michele Colonna, Italian painter (b. 1604)
- March 17 – Nestor Rita, Roman Catholic prelate (1605-87) (b. 1605)
- March 18 – Dorothea Elisabeth Christiansdatter, Danish noble (b. 1629)
- March 19
  - René-Robert Cavelier, Sieur de La Salle, French explorer and fur trader in North America (b. 1643)
  - Daniel Gookin, American soldier and politician (b. 1612)
- March 20
  - Magdalena Sibylle of Brandenburg-Bayreuth, Electress of Saxony by marriage (b. 1612)
  - Marie Eleonore of Dietrichstein, Countess of Kaunitz and Oppersdorf (b. 1623)
- March 22
  - Jean-Antoine Locquet, chancellor of Brabant (b. 1615)
  - Jean-Baptiste Lully, French composer, established opera in France (b. 1632)
- March 24 – Henry Clerke, English academic and physician, President of Magdalen College, Oxford (b. 1621)
- March 27 – Edward Sheldon, English translator (b. 1599)
- March 28 – Constantijn Huygens, Dutch writer, poet and composer (b. 1596)

=== April ===
- April 12
  - Ambrose Dixon, Virginia Colony pioneer (b. c. 1628)
  - Henrietta Hyde, Countess of Rochester, English countess (b. 1646)
- April 16 – George Villiers, 2nd Duke of Buckingham, English statesman and poet (b. 1628)
- April 20 – Richard Olmsted, Connecticut settler (b. 1612)
- April 23 – Ferdinand Albert I, Duke of Brunswick-Wolfenbüttel-Bevern (b. 1636)
- April 25
  - Johannes Caioni, Transylvanian Franciscan friar (b. 1629)
  - Sir Robert Dillington, 2nd Baronet, English member of parliament (b. 1634)
  - Gilberte Périer, French biographer, sister of Blaise Pascal (b. 1620)
- April 27 – Vicente Mut Armengol, Spanish astronomer (b. 1614)
- April 30 – Nguyễn Phúc Tần, Fourth Nguyễn lord (b. 1620)

=== May ===
- May 6 – Daniel Danielsen Knoff, dano-Norwegian civil servant and politician (b. 1614)
- May 18 – Claude de Vin, Mademoiselle des Œillets, Mistress of Louis XIV of France (b. 1637)

=== June ===
- June 16 – François de Beauvilliers, 1st duc de Saint-Aignan, French noble (b. 1607)
- June 24 – Samuel Bernard, French painter (b. 1615)
- June 25 – Princess Myeongan, Korean royal princess (b. 1665)

=== July ===
- July 19 – Laura Martinozzi, Duchess consort of Modena (b. 1639)
- July 27 – Hong Uwŏn, Korean philosopher (b. 1605)

=== August ===
- August 9 – Niccolò Albergati-Ludovisi, Italian Catholic cardinal (b. 1608)
- August 19 – Johann Frischmuth, German orientalist, theologian and philologist (b. 1619)
- August 24
  - Dirk Dalens, painter from the Northern Netherlands (b. 1657)
  - Michael Wise, English composer and organist (b. 1648)
- August 31 – Richard Legh, English politician; (b. 1634)

=== September ===
- September 1 – Henry More, English philosopher (b. 1614)
- September 7
  - Richard Arundell, 1st Baron Arundell of Trerice, English politician (b. 1616)
  - John Upton, English Member of Parliament (b. 1639)
- September 10 – Willem Wissing, Dutch portrait artist (b. 1656)
- September 11 – Thomas Spencer, early settler of Hartford, Connecticut (b. 1607)
- September 12 – John Alden, Mayflower passenger and New World colonist (b. 1598)
- September 15 – Dionigi Bussola, Italian artist (b. 1615)
- September 28 – Francis Turretin, Genevan theologian (b. 1623)

=== October ===
- October 5 – Mikhail Andreyevich Golitsyn, Russian prince and governor (b. 1639)
- October 6 – Henry Savile, English politician (b. 1642)
- October 9 – Georg Balthasar Metzger, German physician and scientist (b. 1623)
- October 12 – Thomas Foote, Lord Mayor of London, 1649 (b. 1598)
- October 13 – Geminiano Montanari, Italian astronomer (b. 1633)
- October 14 – Sarı Süleyman Pasha, Ottoman politician and Grand Vizier (b. 1627)
- October 16 – Johann Paul Auer, German artist (b. 1636)
- October 17 – Frederick Coyett, Swedish noble and Dutch colonial administrator (b. 1615)
- October 18 – Pietro Liberi, Italian painter (b. 1605)
- October 19 – Giulio Bartolocci, Italian Biblical scholar (b. 1613)
- October 21 – Edmund Waller, English poet and politician (b. 1606)
- October 24 – Maria Euphrosyne of Zweibrücken, Swedish princess (b. 1625)
- October 27 – René Rapin, French writer (b. 1620)

=== November ===
- November 3 – Thomas Hickman-Windsor, 1st Earl of Plymouth, English noble (b. 1626)
- November 4
  - Johanna Walpurgis of Leiningen-Westerburg, German noblewoman, by marriage Duchess of Saxe-Weissenfels (b. 1647)
  - Jacques Leneuf de La Poterie, Norman nobleman, seigneur and fur trader in New France (b. 1604)
  - Johannes van Wijckersloot, Dutch painter (b. 1625)
- November 5 – Ioannis Kigalas, Cypriot academic (b. 1622)
- November 6 – Charles de Grimaldi-Régusse, French aristocrat (b. 1612)
- November 7 – Isaac Orobio de Castro, Jewish physician (b. 1617)
- November 14 – Nell Gwyn, English actress, a mistress of Charles II of England (b. 1650)
- November 15 – James Aitken, Bishop of Galloway (b. 1612)
- November 16 – Gaspar Méndez de Haro, 7th Marquess of Carpio, Spanish noble (b. 1629)
- November 18 – Anton Janson, Dutch typefounder and printer (b. 1620)
- November 20 – Olivier Charbonneau, Canadian frontiersman (b. 1613)
- November 26
  - Vere Essex Cromwell, 4th Earl of Ardglass, English noble (b. 1625)
  - Francesco Rosa, Italian painter (b. 1638)

=== December ===
- December 3 – Louis Licherie, French painter (b. 1642)
- December 5 – Ercole Bernabei, Italian composer and organist (b. 1622)
- December 6 – Rajasinha II, Sinhalese King (b. 1608)
- December 10 – Horatio Townshend, 1st Viscount Townshend, English viscount (b. 1630)
- December 12 – Pierre Petit, French scholar, physician and poet (b. 1617)
- December 16 – Sir William Petty, English scientist, philosopher, statistician, economist (b. 1623)
- December 21 – Elizabeth Tilley, English pilgrim settler in North America who was one of the original passengers of the Mayflower (b. 1607)
- December 22
  - Matthias Nicoll, Secretary of New York, mayor of New York City (b. 1626)
  - Charles West, 5th Baron De La Warr (b. 1626)
- December 29 – Canutus Hahn, Swedish bishop (b. 1633)
- date unknown – Josias Fendall, Colonial governor of Maryland (b. c. 1628)
