= John Lloyd =

John Lloyd may refer to:

== Artists, writers, and entertainers ==
- John J. Lloyd (1922–2014), American art director and production designer
- John Lloyd (graphic designer) (born 1944), co-founder of design consultancy Lloyd Northover
- John Lloyd (journalist) (born 1946), Scottish-born writer, journalist and publicist
- John Lloyd (producer) (born 1951), British television producer and comedy writer
- John Bedford Lloyd (born 1956), American actor
- John Morgan Lloyd (1880–1960), Welsh musician and composer
- John Selwyn Lloyd (1931-2023), Welsh-language author

== Sports ==
- John Lloyd (Australian footballer) (1945–2022), Carlton Football Club and father of Matthew Lloyd
- John Lloyd (boxer), British Olympic boxer; see Boxing at the 1908 Summer Olympics – Featherweight
- John Lloyd (referee) (born 1948), Welsh former football referee
- John Lloyd (rugby union) (born 1943), former head coach to Wales national rugby union team
- John Lloyd (tennis) (born 1954), British tennis player
- John Emrys Lloyd (1905–1987), British Olympic fencer
- John Henry Lloyd (1884–1964), Negro leagues baseball player "Pop" Lloyd
- John Lloyd (cricketer) (1844–1910), Welsh cricketer and barrister
- Johnny Lloyd (1907–1985), British motorcycle speedway rider
- Eddie Lloyd (John E. Lloyd, 1902–?), English professional footballer

== Government, legal, and military ==
- John Lloyd (Australian politician) (1818–1881), New South Wales politician
- John Lloyd (Australian public servant), former Australian Public Service Commissioner
- John Lloyd (brigadier) (1894–1965), Australian soldier and commander 16th Brigade
- John Lloyd (MP for Denbighshire) (c. 1560–1606), British Member of Parliament
- John Lloyd (Canadian politician) (1908–1985), member of Canadian House of Commons for Halifax electoral district
- John Lloyd (Cardiganshire) (c. 1717–1755), Welsh Member of Parliament for Ceredigion
- John Lloyd (civil servant) (born 1940), formerly Clerk to the National Assembly for Wales
- John Lloyd (judge) (died 1607), one of the founding fellows of Jesus College, Oxford and judge of the High Court of Admiralty
- John Lloyd (political reformer) (1833–1915), Welsh-born member of the London County Council
- John Lloyd (scholar) (1750–1815), Welsh scholar, Fellow of the Royal Society and Member of Parliament for Flintshire
- John Horatio Lloyd (1798–1884), British Member of Parliament for Stockport
- John W. Lloyd (1831–?), American Medal of Honor recipient
- John Yeeden Lloyd (1795–?), member of the New Zealand Legislative Council
- Sir John Lloyd, 1st Baronet (died 1664), British Member of Parliament for Carmarthenshire
- Selwyn Lloyd (John Selwyn Brooke Lloyd, 1904–1978), foreign secretary of the United Kingdom

== Religious figures ==
- John Lloyd (rector of Caerwys) (1733–1793), Welsh cleric and antiquarian
- John Lloyd (bishop of St Davids) (1638–1687), Vice-Chancellor of Oxford University, 1682–85
- John Lloyd (bishop of Swansea) (1847–1915), Welsh suffragan bishop
- John Lloyd (vicar of Cilcain) (1754–c. 1807), Welsh clergyman and academic
- Saint John Lloyd (died 1679), one of the Catholic Forty Martyrs of England and Wales
- John Lloyd (archdeacon of Montgomery) (1879–1951), Welsh clergyman
- J. P. D. Lloyd (John Plummer Derwent Lloyd, 1861–1933), Episcopal cleric in the United States and Canada

== Other people ==
- John Augustus Lloyd (1800–1854), English engineer and surveyor
- John Edward Lloyd (1861–1947), Welsh historian
- John Hardress Lloyd (1874–1952), soldier and polo player
- John M. Lloyd (died 1892), Washington, D.C. policeman
- John Uri Lloyd (1849–1936), American pharmacist
- J. William Lloyd (1857–1940), American individualist anarchist
- John Davies Knatchbull Lloyd, antiquarian researcher and public servant
- John Lloyd (archaeologist), British classical archaeologist

== See also ==
- Jon Lloyd (disambiguation)
- John Lloyd Cruz (born 1983), Filipino actor
- John Loyd (1875–1943), American college football player and physician
- Jonathan Lloyd (disambiguation)
