= 1737 =

1737 in various calendars
- Gregorian calendar: 1737; MDCCXXXVII
- Ab urbe condita: 2490
- Armenian calendar: 1186; ԹՎ ՌՃՁԶ
- Assyrian calendar: 6487
- Balinese saka calendar: 1658–1659
- Bengali calendar: 1143–1144
- Berber calendar: 2687
- British Regnal year: 10 Geo. 2 – 11 Geo. 2
- Buddhist calendar: 2281
- Burmese calendar: 1099
- Byzantine calendar: 7245–7246
- Chinese calendar: 丙辰年 (Fire Dragon); 4434 or 4227 — to — 丁巳年 (Fire Snake); 4435 or 4228
- Coptic calendar: 1453–1454
- Discordian calendar: 2903
- Ethiopian calendar: 1729–1730
- Hebrew calendar: 5497–5498
- Hindu calendars
- Vikram Samvat: 1793–1794
- Shaka Samvat: 1658–1659
- Kali Yuga: 4837–4838
- Holocene calendar: 11737
- Igbo calendar: 737–738
- Iranian calendar: 1115–1116
- Islamic calendar: 1149–1150
- Japanese calendar: Genbun 2 (元文２年)
- Javanese calendar: 1661–1662
- Julian calendar: Gregorian minus 11 days
- Korean calendar: 4070
- Minguo calendar: 175 before ROC 民前175年
- Nanakshahi calendar: 269
- Thai solar calendar: 2279–2280
- Tibetan calendar: མེ་ཕོ་འབྲུག་ལོ་ (male Fire-Dragon); 1863 or 1482 or 710 — to — མེ་མོ་སྦྲུལ་ལོ་ (female Fire-Snake); 1864 or 1483 or 711

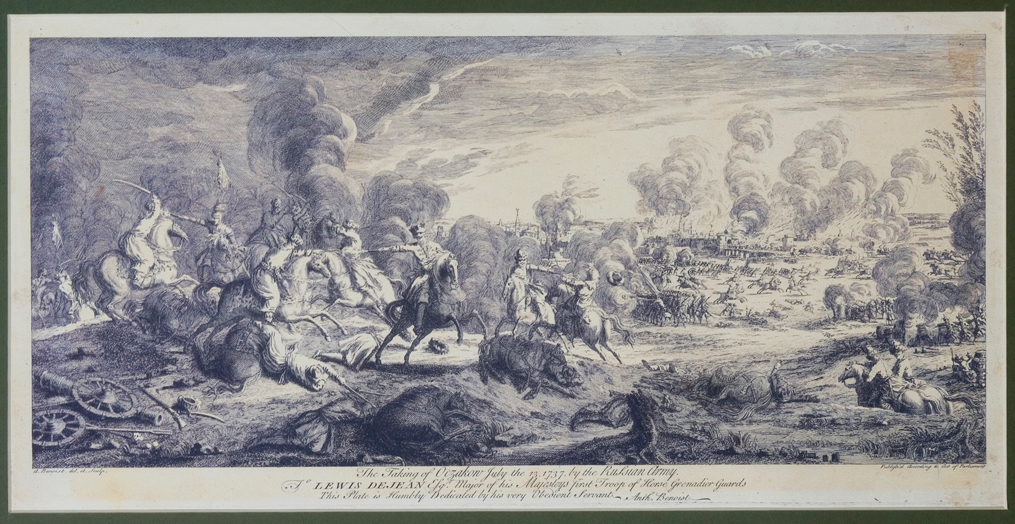
June 30: Russians take 4,000 Ottoman defenders prisoner in conquest of Ochakiv.

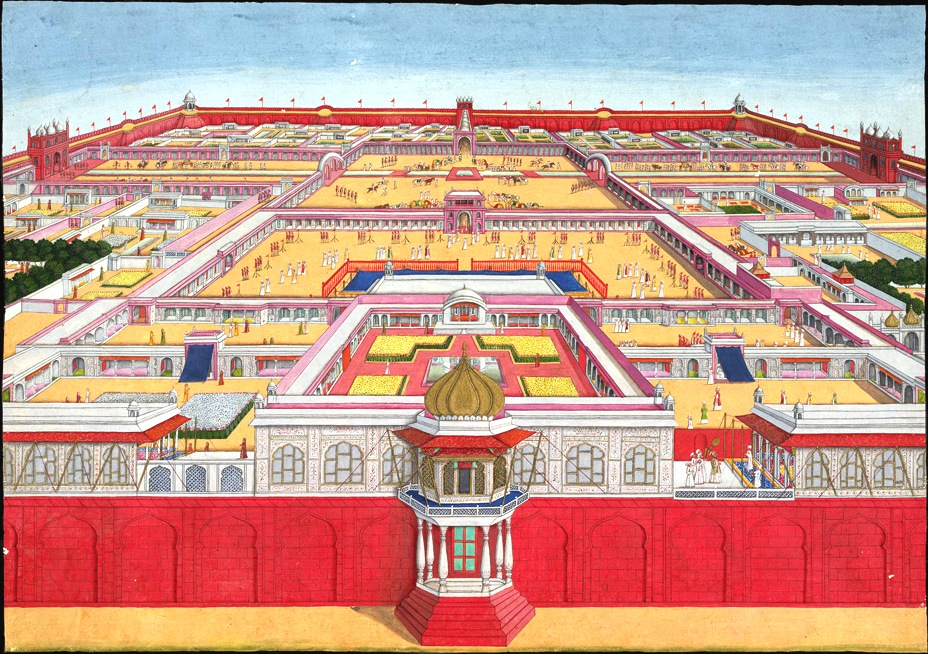
March 28: Battle of Delhi

1737 (MDCCXXXVII) was a common year starting on Tuesday of the Gregorian calendar and a common year starting on Saturday of the Julian calendar, the 1737th year of the Common Era (CE) and Anno Domini (AD) designations, the 737th year of the 2nd millennium, the 37th year of the 18th century, and the 8th year of the 1730s decade. As of the start of 1737, the Gregorian calendar was 11 days ahead of the Julian calendar, which remained in localized use until 1923.

== Events ==
=== January–March ===
- January 5 – Spain and the Holy Roman Empire sign instruments of cession at Pontremoli in the Grand Duchy of Tuscany in Italy, with the Empire receiving control of Tuscany and the Grand Duchy of Parma and Piacenza, in return for Don Carlos of Spain being recognized as King of Naples and King of Sicily.
- January 9 – The Empires of Austria and Russia enter into a secret military alliance that leads to Austria's disastrous entry into the Russo-Turkish War.
- January 18 – In Manila, a peace treaty is signed between Spain's Governor-General of the Philippines, Fernándo Valdés y Tamon, and the Sultan Azim ud-Din I of Sulu, recognizing Azim's authority over the islands of the Sulu Archipelago.
- February 20 – France's Foreign Minister, Germain Louis Chauvelin, is dismissed by King Louis XV's Chief Minister, Cardinal André-Hercule de Fleury
- February 27 – French scientists Henri-Louis Duhamel du Monceau and Georges-Louis Leclerc de Buffon publish the first study correlating past weather conditions with an examination of tree rings.
- March 16 – In Paris, representatives of Spain and Portugal sign an armistice bringing an end to the Spanish–Portuguese War over the area now occupied by the nation of Uruguay and the area now occupied by the state of Rio Grande do Sul in Brazil. The news does not reach the fighting parties until five months later.
- March 28 – The Battle of Delhi takes place between the Maratha Empire and the Mughals.

=== April–June ===
- April 5 – French Jesuit priest Jean-François Régis is canonized as Saint Regis by the Roman Catholic Church under the reign of Pope Clement XII.
- April 22
  - In Afghanistan, Persian shah Nader Shah begins the 11-month Siege of Kandahar against the Pashtun Emir of Afghanistan, Hussain Hotak. The surviving Afghanis surrender on March 24, 1738.
  - Lots are first advertised for sale in the new town of Richmond, Virginia, by the placement of a notice by William Byrd in the Virginia Gazette. According to the paper, "... on the North Side of James River, near the Uppermost Landing, and a little below the Falls, is lately laid off by Major Mayo, a Town, called Richmond, with Streets 65 Feet wide, in a pleasant and healthy Situation, and well supply'd with Springs of good Water. It lies near the Publick Warehouse at Shoccoe's, and in the midst of great Quantities of Grain, and all kind of Provisions. The Lots will be granted in Fee Simple, on Condition only of building a House in Three Years Time, of 24 by 16 Feet, fronting within 5 Feet of the Street. The Lots to be rated according to the Convenience of their Situation, and to be sold after this April General Court, by me, William Byrd."
- May 28 – The planet Venus passes in front of Mercury. The event is witnessed during the evening hours, by the amateur astronomer John Bevis, at the Royal Greenwich Observatory. As of 2006, it is still the only such planet/planet occultation that has been directly observed.
- June 21 – In Britain, the Theatrical Licensing Act requires plays to be submitted to the Lord Chamberlain for censorship.
- June 30 – Russo-Turkish War, 1735-1739: Russian forces under Field Marshal Munnich storm the Ottoman fortress of Ochakov, and take prisoner 4,000 Turks.

=== July–September ===
- July 9 – The direct male line of the Medici family becomes extinct, with the death of Gian Gastone de' Medici, Grand Duke of Tuscany.
- July 12 – Austria enters the Russo-Turkish War as an ally of Russia against the Ottoman Empire.
- July 17 – The British ship Catherine founders in a storm off of Nova Scotia's Cape Sable Island during its voyage from Ireland to Boston, killing 98 of the 201 people on board.
- August 4 – Austria's army is defeated by the Ottoman Army and Bosnian defenders in the Battle of Banja Luka.
- August 15 – The Portuguese frigate Nossa Senhora da Boa Viagem arrives at Maldonado (now in Uruguay) as Captain Duarte Pereira brings the news that the Spanish–Portuguese War ended by an agreement signed on March 16.
- September 1 – The oldest existing English language newspaper in the world, The News Letter, is founded in Belfast, Ireland.
- September 20 – Runner Edward Marshall completes his journey in the Walking Purchase, forcing the cession of 1,200,000 acres (4,900 km^{2}) of Lenape-Delaware tribal land to the Province of Pennsylvania.

=== October–December ===
- October 7 – At least 300,000 people are killed when a tropical cyclone strikes the Bay of Bengal in India and modern-day Bangladesh. The storm sends 12 m (39 ft) high waves over the Sundarbans delta, and overflows the Hooghly River.
- October 11 – The first national stage in Sweden opens, when Carl Gyllenborg's play Den svenska sprätthöken is performed in the Swedish language, by the first native actors, on the stage of Bollhuset in Stockholm.
- October 16 – An earthquake with an estimated magnitude of 9.3 occurs off the shore of Russia's Kamchatka Peninsula. Tsunamis up to 60 metres (200 ft) high follow in the Pacific ocean.
- November 4 – The Teatro di San Carlo, the oldest working opera house in Europe, is inaugurated in Naples, Italy.
- December 24 – General Baji Rao I of the Maratha Empire in India defeats the armies of the rulers of Hyderabad, Oudh, Bhopal and Jaipur in the Battle of Bhopal.
- December – John Wesley leaves Savannah, Georgia, and returns to England.

=== Date unknown ===
- Benjamin Franklin creates the Philadelphia Police Force – the first city-paid force.
- The Georg August University of Göttingen in Lower Saxony is opened to students.
- Our Lady of Guadalupe is designated the patron saint of Mexico City.
- Lancaster County Prison, Lancaster, Pennsylvania is first constructed, in response to the seven preceding violent years of the ongoing Cresap's War in the Maryland-Pennsylvania boundary dispute and war.

== Births ==
- January 4 – Louis-Bernard Guyton de Morveau, French chemist, politician (d. 1816)
- January 23 – John Hancock, American politician and revolutionary (d. 1793)

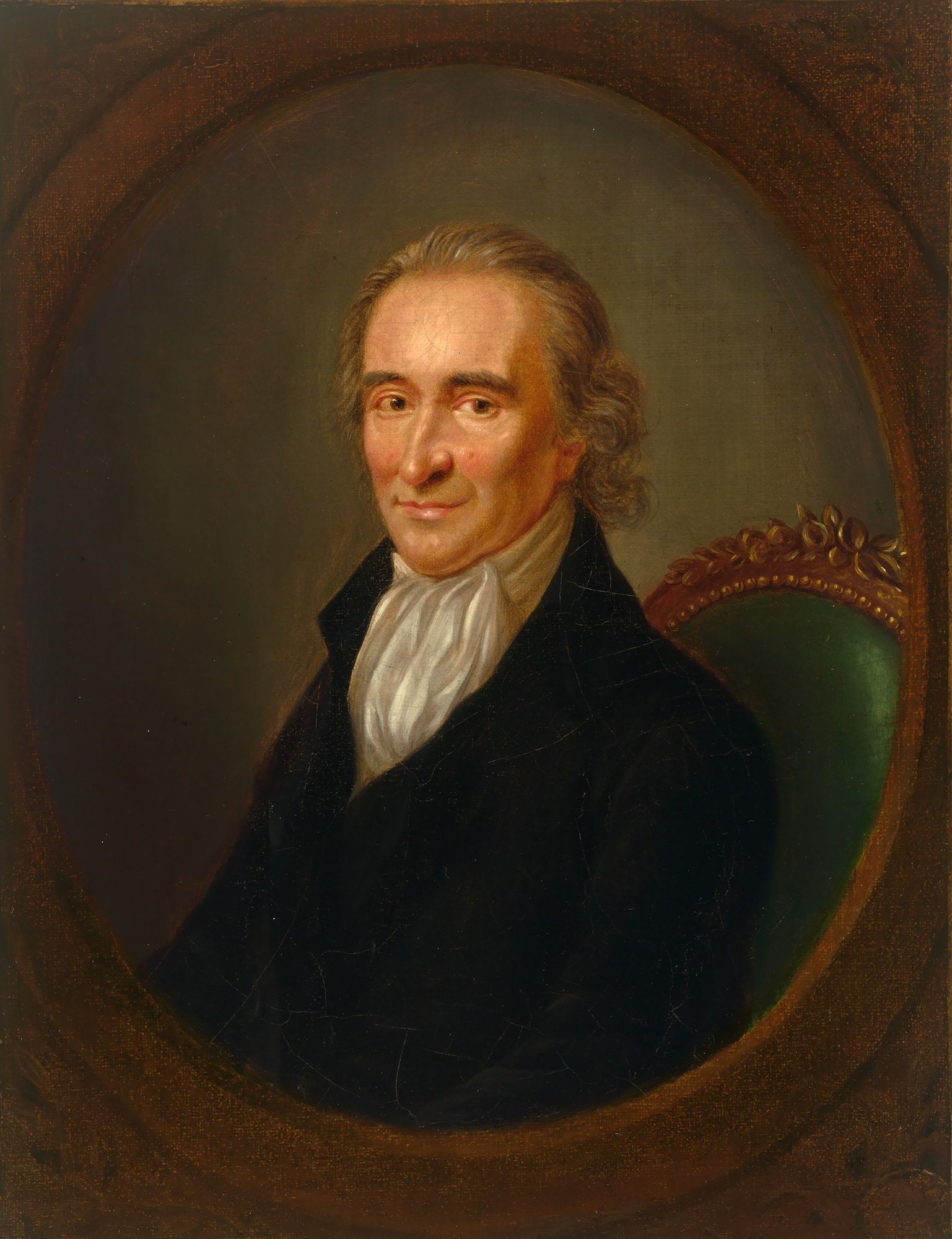
Thomas Paine

- January 29 – Thomas Paine, British-born American patriot and pamphleteer (d. 1809)
- March 14 – Ioan Nicolidi of Pindus, Aromanian physician and noble (d. 1828)
- March 23 – Arthur St. Clair, American soldier and politician (d. 1818)
- April 27 – Edward Gibbon, English historian and politician (d. 1794)
- May 2 – William Petty, 2nd Earl of Shelburne, Prime Minister of Great Britain (d. 1805)
- June 20 – Tokugawa Ieharu, Japanese shōgun (d. 1786)
- August 5 – Johann Friedrich Struensee, Danish royal physician (d. 1772)
- August 12 – Antoine-Augustin Parmentier, French agronomist (d. 1813)
- August 14 – Charles Hutton, English mathematician (d. 1823)
- August 29 – John Hunter, second governor of New South Wales (d. 1821)
- September 9 – Luigi Galvani, Italian physician and physicist (d. 1798)
- September 14 – Michael Haydn, Austrian composer (d. 1806)
- September 15 – Miklós Küzmics, Hungarian Slovenes writer, Catholic priest (d. 1804)
- September 19 – Charles Carroll of Carrollton, only Roman Catholic signer of the American Declaration of Independence (d. 1832)
- October 4 – Fryderyk Karol Emanuel Hauke, military officer, teacher (d. 1810)
- December 26 – Prince Josias of Coburg, Austrian general (d. 1815)
- date unknown –
  - Frances Abington, English actress (d. 1815)
  - Gelelemend, Indigenous American (Lenape) leader (d. 1811)

== Deaths ==
- January 24 – William Wake, Archbishop of Canterbury (b. 1657)
- January 29 – George Hamilton, 1st Earl of Orkney, British soldier (b. 1666)
- February 14 – Charles Talbot, 1st Baron Talbot of Hensol, Lord Chancellor of Great Britain (b. 1685)
- March 12 – Charles Alexander, Duke of Württemberg, regent of the Kingdom of Serbia (1720–1733) (b. 1684)
- March 16 – Benjamin Wadsworth, American President of Harvard University (b. 1670)
- March 26 – Vakhtang VI, king of the Kingdom of Kartli under the Bagrationi dynasty (b. 1675)
- May 3 – James Johnston (secretary of state), diplomat, Secretary of State for Scotland (b. 1655)
- May 4
  - Eustace Budgell, English writer (b. 1686)
  - Ferdinand Kettler, Duke of Courland and Semigallia (b. 1655)
- May 10 – Emperor Nakamikado of Japan (b. 1702)
- May 17 – Claude Buffier, French philosopher and historian (b. 1661)
- June 6 – Pierre Joseph Garidel, French botanist (b. 1658)
- July 26 – Henri-Pons de Thiard de Bissy, French Catholic priest, bishop and cardinal (b. 1657)
- July 9 – Gian Gastone de' Medici, Grand Duke of Tuscany (b. 1671)
- July 26 – Johan Cronman, Swedish general (b. 1662)
- July 27 – Maria Maddalena Martinengo, Italian nun (b. 1687)
- September 27 – John Sidney, 6th Earl of Leicester, English privy councillor (b. 1680)
- October 12 – François Catrou, French historian and Jesuit priest (b. 1659)
- October 26 – Rinaldo d'Este, Duke of Modena (b. 1655)
- November 11 – Claude de Visdelou, French missionary (b. 1656)
- November 20 – Caroline of Ansbach, queen of George II of Great Britain (b. 1683)
- December 11 – John Strype, English historian and biographer (b. 1643)

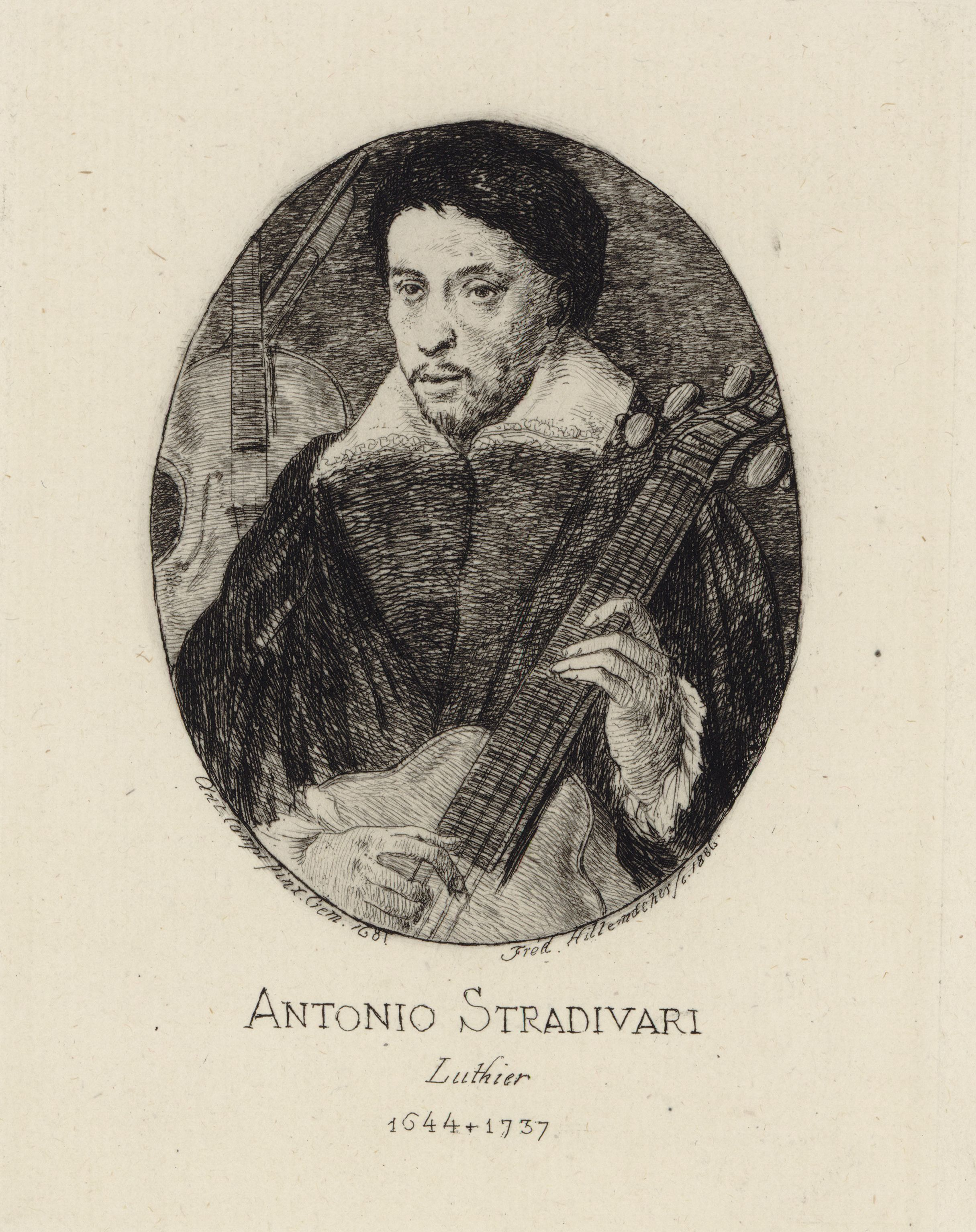
Antonio Stradivari

- December 18 – Antonio Stradivari, Italian luthier (b. 1644)
- December 19 – James Sobieski, Crown Prince of Poland (b. 1667)
- December 21 – Alessandro Galilei, Italian architect, mathematician (b. 1691)
- December 27
  - William Bowyer, English printer (b. 1663)
  - Victor-Marie d'Estrées, Marshal of France (b. 1660)
- Date unknown – Sally Mapp, English lay bonesetter
