= Jonathan Lloyd =

Jonathan Lloyd may refer to:

- Jonathan Lloyd (composer) (1948–2025), British composer
- Jonathan Lloyd (priest) (born 1956), Anglican priest
- Johnathan Loyd (born 1991), American basketball player

== See also ==
- Jonathan Lloyd Walker (born 1967), English-Canadian film and television actor, producer and screenwriter
- John Lloyd (disambiguation)
