= Stefan Wierzbowski =

Polish clergyman and bishop

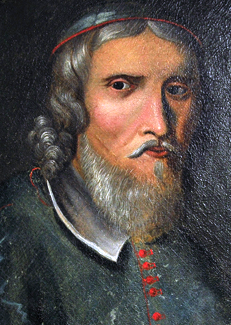
Stefan Wierzbowski

Stefan Wierzbowski (born c. 1620) was a Polish clergyman and bishop for the Roman Catholic Diocese of Poznań. He became ordained in 1663, and was appointed bishop in 1664. As bishop, he turned Góra Kalwaria into a dedication to Calvary.

Wierzbowski died in 1687 in Góra Kalwaria. He was the uncle of Bishop Hieronim Wierzbowski.
