= Giovanni Battista Scaramelli =

Italian Jesuit, ethicist and ascetical writer

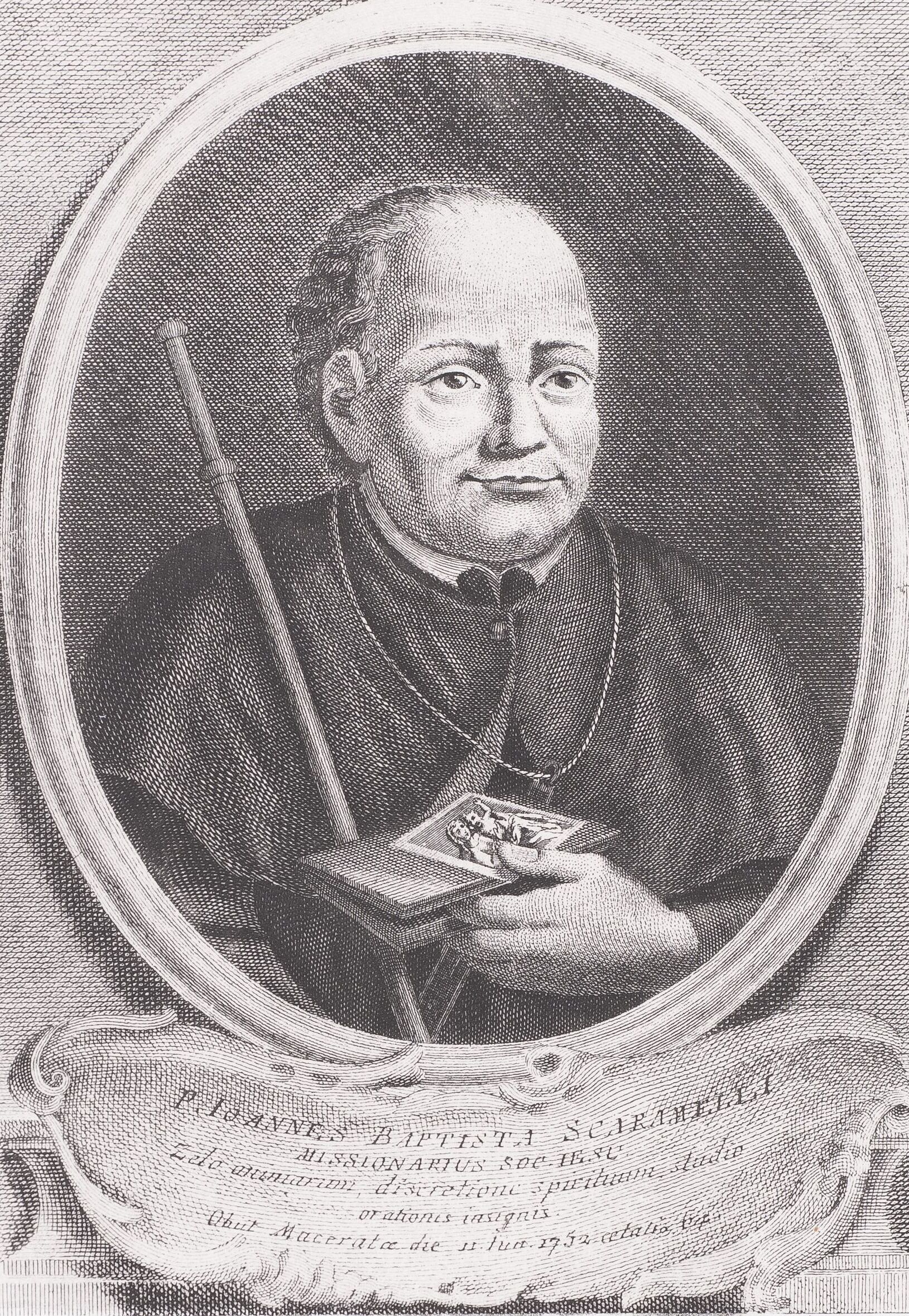
Giovanni Battista Scaramelli

Giovanni Battista Scaramelli (24 November 1687 – 11 January 1752) was an Italian Jesuit, ethicist, and ascetical writer.

== Biography ==
He was born at Rome and died at Macerata in 1752. He entered the Society of Jesus on 21 September 1706. He devoted himself to preaching and the ministry for fifteen years.

== Legacy ==
According to Dominican theologian Jordan Aumann, Scaramelli was the first to use the term "asceticism" in contradistinction to the older word mystical after the term had been introduced by the Franciscan friar named Dobrosielski into the Latin usage of western theology in 1655.

The 1913 Catholic Encyclopedia praises Scaramelli's work on ethics in his Directorium Asceticum, crediting it with standing the test of time and integrating well with modern psychology.

== Writings ==
- Vita di Suor Maria Crocifissa Satellico Monaca francescana nel monastero di monte Nuovo (1750)
- Discernimento de' spiriti per il retto regolamento delle azione proprie ed altrui. Operetta utile specialemente ai Direttori delle anime (1753)
- Direttorio ascetico in cui s'insegna il modo di condurre l'Anime per vie ordinarie della grazia alla perfezione christiana, indirizzato ai direttori della Anime (1752) (English edition Directorium Asceticum)
- Il direttorio mistico indirizzato a' direttori di quelle anime che Iddio conduce per la via della contemplazione (1754)
- Dottrina di S. Giovanni della Croce (1860)

== His books online ==
works of Scaramelli at archive.org
