= Louis Licherie =

French painter and engraver

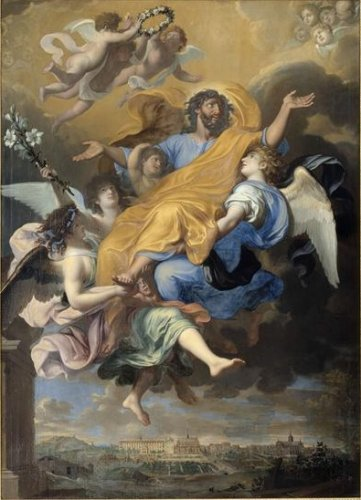
The Rapture of Saint Joseph

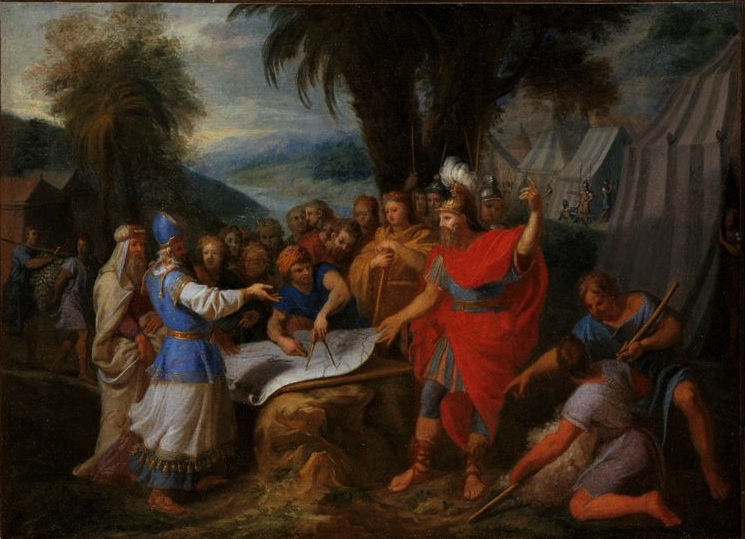
The Sharing of the Holy Land

Louis Licherie de Beurie (6 July 1629 – 3 December 1687) was a French painter and engraver in the Baroque style. He specialized in Biblical and historical scenes.

== Life and works ==
Born in Nesle-Hodeng, he was originally a student of Louis Boullogne. In 1666, he found employment as a member of the workshop of Charles Le Brun, the Premier peintre du Roi, who was responsible for all the grand decorations created during the reign of King Louis XIV. The following year, he was appointed director of the drawing and design school at the Gobelins Manufactory, whose chief director was Le Brun. He held that position until 1670.

He became a member of the Académie royale de peinture et de sculpture in 1679. His reception piece was a scene depicting Abigail bringing gifts to King David, which is now preserved at the École nationale supérieure des Beaux-Arts. In 1681, he was named an assistant professor.

Many of his works were created for religious institutions, notably at Saint-Germain l'Auxerrois and the Chartreuse de Bourgfontaine. The catalog of his known works has grown considerably due to recent research.

His works may be seen at the Louvre, the Musée des beaux-arts de Nantes, Musée des beaux-arts de Rouen, Musée Thomas-Henry, Musée Magnin and at the Musée de la Grande Chartreuse.

Licherie died in Paris in 1687.
