= Mattheus Pinna da Encarnaçao =

Mattheus Pinna da Encarnaçao (23 August 1687 – 18 December 1764) was a Brazilian Benedictine writer and theologian.

== Life ==
He was born at Rio de Janeiro. On 3 March 1703, he became a Benedictine at the Abbey of Nossa Senhora do Montserrate at Rio de Janeiro, where he also studied the humanities and philosophy under José da Natividade. After studying theology at the monastery of Bahia, he was ordained a priest on 24 March 1708, and appointed professor of philosophy and theology.

Along with Gaspar da Madre de Deus (died 1800), Antonio de São Bernardo (died 1774) and a few others, he was considered among the most learned Benedictines of his province. In 1726 he was elected abbot of the monastery at Rio de Janeiro, but soon after his election incurred the displeasure of Luiz Vahia Monteiro, the Governor of Brazil, who banished him from his monastery in 1727.

He escaped to Portugal, became very influential at Court and was restored to his monastery by Cardinal João da Mota e Silva in 1729. He held the office of abbot repeatedly thereafter; both at Rio de Janeiro (1729–31 and 1739) and at Bahia in 1746. In 1732 he was elected provincial abbot, in which capacity he visited the distant monasteries of Brazil, despite the difficulty of travel. He was again elected provincial abbot in 1752, but this time he declined, preferring to spend his old age in prayer and retirement. He died in Rio de Janeiro.

== Works ==
His works are:

- Defensio S. Matris Ecclesiæ (Lisbon, 1729), an extensive treatise on grace and free will against Quesnel, Baius, Jansenius, etc.
- Viridario Evangelico (Lisbon, 1730–37), four volumes of sermons on the Gospels
- Theologia Scholastica Dogmatica, in six volumes, which he did not complete entirely, nor was it published
