= Jacob Esselens =

Dutch Golden Age landscape painter

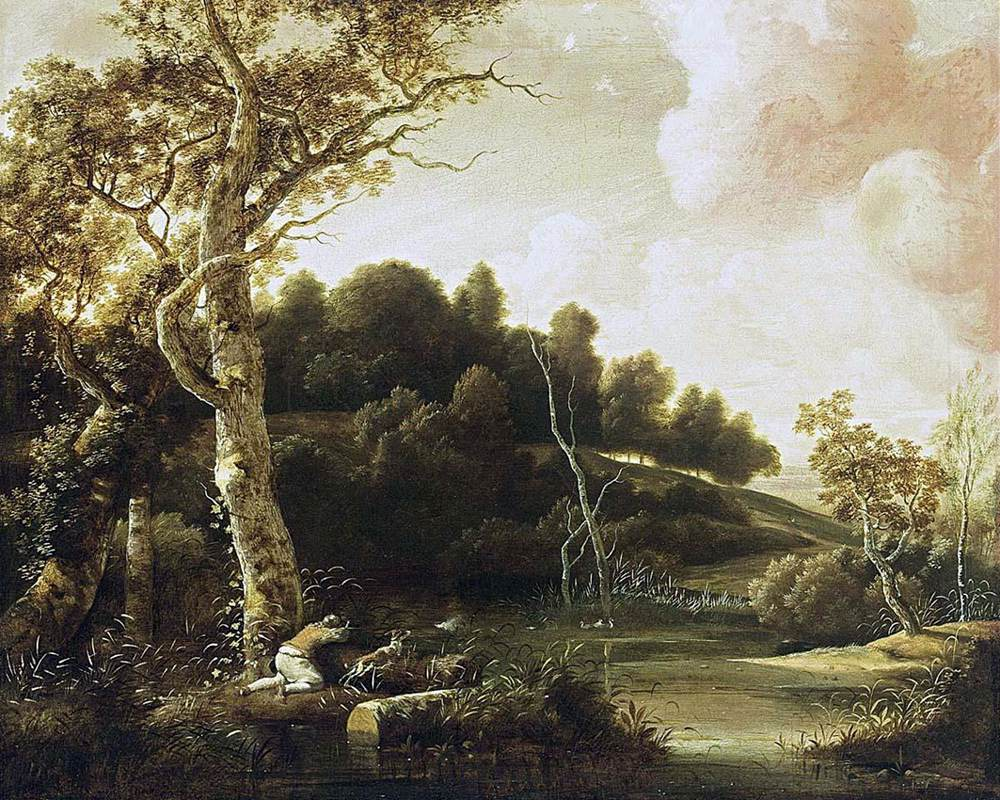
River Landscape

Jacob Esselens (1626–1687), was a Dutch Golden Age landscape painter from Amsterdam.

== Biography ==
According to the Netherlands Institute for Art History, Esselens travelled to Kleve in 1663 and got married in 1668 in Amsterdam. He travelled in France and later to England as a silk merchant, and died in Amsterdam in 1687.
