= Johann Paul Auer =

German painter (1636–1687)

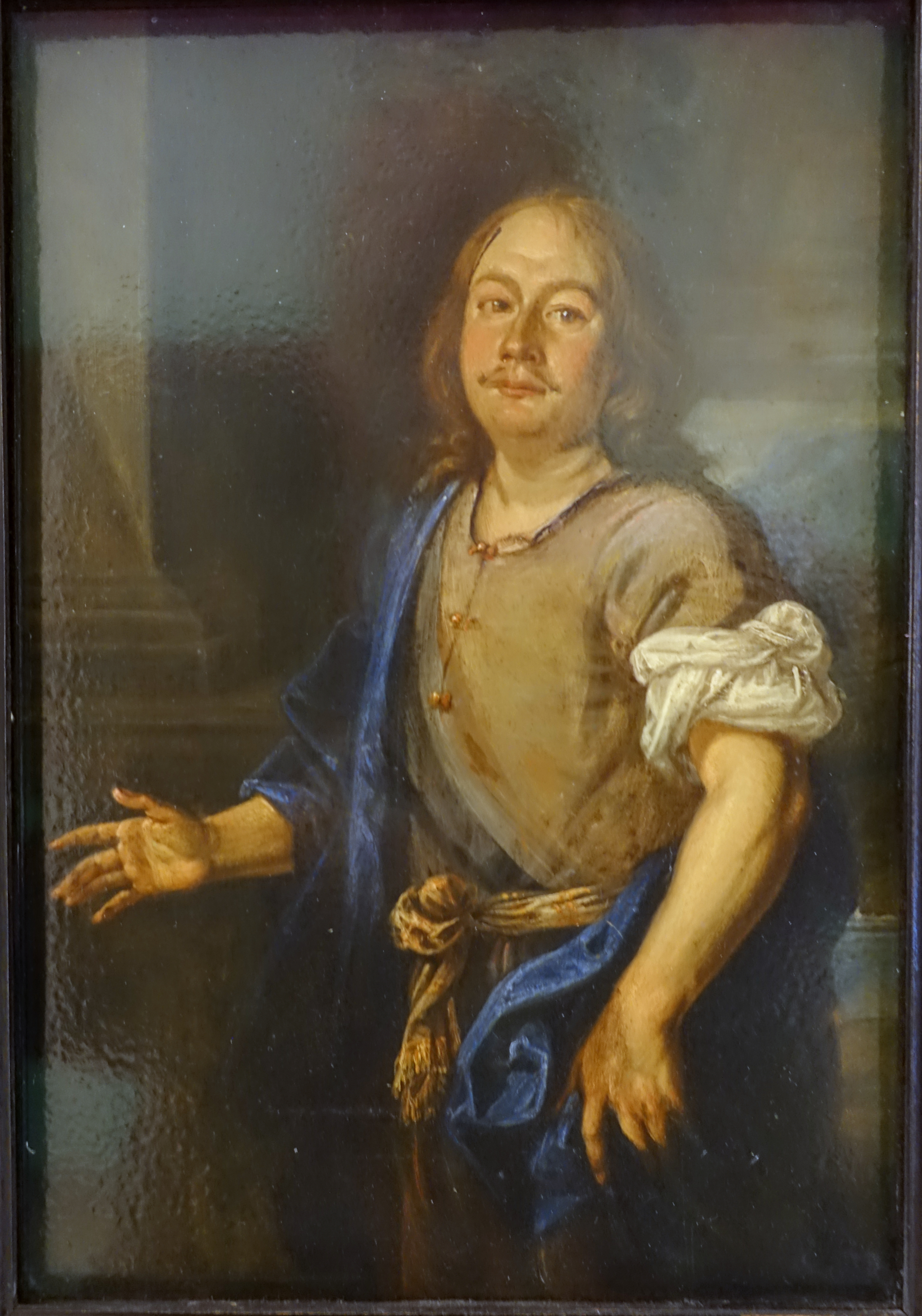
Georg Schweigger (1613-1690), sculptor, by Johann Paul Auer, 1668, oil on copper - Stadtmuseum Fembohaus

Johann Paul Auer (1636–1687) was a German painter. Born in Nuremberg, he studied from 1654 to 1658 under Georg Christoph Eimmart at Ratisbon. In 1660 he went to Venice, and there received instructions from Pietro Liberi. He then went to Rome, where he stayed upwards of four years, and thence through Turin and Lyons to Paris, and so home to Nuremberg in 1670. He died in 1687. Auer painted historical, landscape, and genre pictures, besides portraits of many famous individuals, for which he was very celebrated.
