= Mary Hobry =

English midwife and murderer

Mary Hobry (sometimes spelled Mary Hobrey/Aubrey) (d. 1688) was a 17th-century midwife living in England, convicted for murdering her abusive husband and burnt at the stake.

== Biography ==
Mary Hobry was a French Catholic midwife living in London. She was married to Denis Hobry in 1684. Her husband was a drunkard, squandered the money she earned and frequently used to beat her up. She sought for his approval to their mutual separation but her husband disagreed. She reportedly considered suicide and running away from him. Fed up of the constant beatings, Hobry told her husband that if he did not change, she "would kill him".

On the night of 27 January 1687, Denis returned home inebriated at five in the morning, punched Mary in her stomach, forced himself upon her and, when she resisted, beat her up violently causing her to bleed. When he was sleeping Hobry strangled him with his garter, decapitated him and chopped off his limbs. His son suggested her not to throw the body parts in river. She threw the torso on a dunghill at some distance from her house and the head and limbs in separate privies in the Savoy Palace.

Mary was arrested after the identity of the deceased was discerned from the body parts and she was arraigned at the Old Bailey on 22 February. She pleaded guilty and the following day was sentenced to be burnt.

Hobry's act caused a sensation in England and her trial and confession were reported in pamphlets and a ballad was made on her crime. She was burnt at the stake on 2 March 1688.

Roger L'Estrange published A Hellish Murder based on his interrogation with her. An Epilogue to the French Midwife's Tragedy was poet Elkanah Settle's interpretation of the murder.

== Bibliography ==
- Banerjee, P. (2016). Burning Women: Widows, Witches, and Early Modern European Travelers in India. Palgrave Macmillan US. ISBN 978-1-137-05204-9.
- Dolan, Frances E. (2010). Marriage and Violence: The Early Modern Legacy. University of Pennsylvania Press. ISBN 978-0-8122-0177-2.
