= Eddie Lloyd =

English footballer

Personal information
- Date of birth: 1902
- Place of birth: Middlesbrough, England
- Height: 5 ft 7 in (1.70 m)
- Position: Left half

Senior career*
Years	Team	Apps	(Gls)
- North Ormesby Nomads
- Stockton
1922–1923	Middlesbrough		
1923–1930	Bradford City	157	(4)
- Derry City
- * Club domestic league appearances and goals

John E. Lloyd, (born 1902) known as Eddie Lloyd was an English professional footballer who played as a left half.

== Career ==
Lloyd played for North Ormesby Nomads, Stockton, Middlesbrough, Bradford City and Derry City. For Bradford City, he made 157 appearances in the Football League; he also made 6 FA Cup appearances.

== Sources ==
- Frost, Terry (1988). Bradford City A Complete Record 1903-1988. Breedon Books Sport. ISBN 0-907969-38-0.
