= Durastante Natalucci =

Italian historian (1687–1772)

Durastante Tommaso Francesco Emiliano Natalucci (17 September 1687 – 22 May 1772) was an Italian historian who specialized in history of Trevi, in Umbria.

Born at Picicche di Trevi into one of the prominent families of the area, he was tonsured at age 7, upon the death of an uncle of his who had been priest of SS. Crocifisso: he received the benefice of that church from Pope Innocent XII. He studied with the Jesuits in nearby Spoleto from 1704 to 1709, when he moved to Rome to study law. His father had died in 1705, so when his mother fell ill around 1710, he returned to Trevi to take care of his family's affairs, in which task he succeeded well enough that he was entrusted similar work on behalf of other local families. Over the next ten or twelve years he accompanied the bishop of Spoleto on his pastoral rounds, possibly serving as a reliable secretary versed in the affairs of Trevi whenever the bishop needed to visit the northern area of his large diocese. This experience deepened his interest in the history of his hometown and its dependencies. He started to consign the historical information he collected to a series of notebooks, and gradually formed them into what would become his Historia Universale dello stato temporale ed eclesiastico (sic) di Trevi. In 1726 he was elected attorney for the comune of Trevi, and later became magistrate with the town council.

He was, however, suddenly afflicted with total blindness in 1747, which put an end to his efforts; in that same year, having been a lifelong bachelor, he decided to marry a noblewoman from Spoleto, who bore him three children, Giuseppe, Maria, and another who lived only a few days. His work, though well advanced, remained unpublished, in the state it had reached in 1745, until 1985, when thanks to Giuseppe Natalucci, a descendant, the sole manuscript was made available to another Trevi historian, Carlo Zenobi, who produced a careful edition.

Natalucci's history of Trevi, though still essentially a draft, exhaustively documents the history of the Trevi area based on many hundreds of meticulously noted sources. It focuses primarily on land parcels and the families and church entities that controlled them, and provides a minute picture of rural Umbria in the Middle Ages through the first half of the 18th century. It is of particular value in that many of his sources — cartularies, cadastral documents, etc. — no longer exist, and Natalucci showed himself a true scholar in scrupulously sourcing his facts.
