= Maria Maddalena Martinengo =

Italian Roman Catholic nun

Blessed Maria Maddalena Martinengo
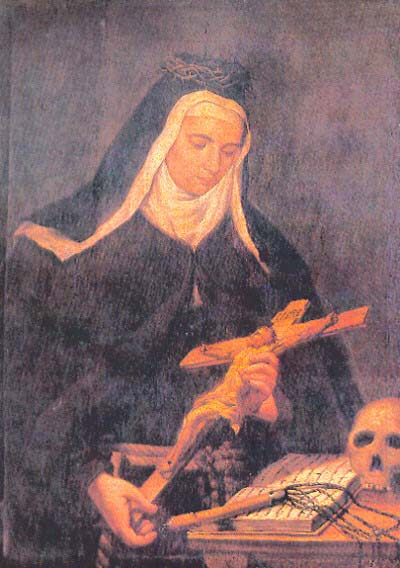

Religious
- Born: 5 October 1687; Brescia, Duchy of Milan
- Died: 27 July 1737 (aged 49); Brescia, Duchy of Milan
- Venerated in: Roman Catholic Church
- Beatified: 3 June 1900, Saint Peter's Basilica, Kingdom of Italy by Pope Leo XIII
- Feast: 27 July
- Attributes: Nun's habit; Crucifix; Rosary; White flowers
- Patronage: Against tuberculosis

Maria Maddalena Martinengo (5 October 1687 – 27 July 1737), born Margherita Martinengo, was an Italian Roman Catholic professed nun of the order of the Capuchin Poor Clare nuns.

Martinengo devoted her life as a professed religious to the performance of small but humble chores in her time as a Poor Clare nun and was noted for her life of spiritual discernment and devotion to God above all else.

Pope Leo XIII beatified Martinengo on 3 June 1900.

== Life ==
Margherita Martinengo was born on 5 October 1687 in Brescia into a noble household in the Martinengo Ducal Palace to Francesco Leopoldo Martinengo and Margherita Secchi d'Aragona; her brothers were Nestore and Gianfrancesco. Her paternal uncle was Giambattista. Her mother died five months after her birth in 1688. She was baptized straight after her birth since there was fear that she might die. The baptism ceremonies for her were celebrated on 21 August 1691 at the baptism of her half-sister Cecilia born to the second marriage of her father to Elena Palazzi.

As a child she was perceived to be an intelligent girl and received a structured and comprehensive education based on the civic and religious studies. At the age of six she was entrusted to the Ursulines for additional education. Her teacher Isabella Marazzi instructed her in proper devotional practices to God and Marazzi was a formative role in Martinengo's religious education. Martinengo was an avid reader and made full use of the Latin literature that her father owned.

On one occasion during her childhood she was in a carriage that six horses ran and she fell out. She would have been crushed and run over from other carriages had there not been what she described as an invisible touch that seemed to save her life.

On 11 October 1689 she entered the convent boarding school of the Augustinian nuns of Santa Maria degli Angeli - two nuns there were her maternal aunts and she continued her education there.

She had her First Communion towards the end of her childhood in which – in the heat and emotion of the moment – she dropped the Host which forced her to pick it up from the floor with her tongue.

In August 1699 she asked her father for permission to go the Spirito Santo boarding school of the Benedictines. Before she could go there she had a vacation with her father and siblings for a few months in the mountains around Lago d'Iseo where she realized what her true religious calling was.

Sometime around this point at the age of thirteen she took a vow to God in which she promised to remain a virgin. But at the age of sixteen several suitors approached her and her father had even promised her to the son of a prominent Venetian senator. It even grew to the point where her two brothers Nestore and Gianfrancesco prompted her to accept one of the offers. Her suitors bought her books and love stories and she did in fact like them – but she brooded over the fact that such stories given to her were "books from Hell".

Martinengo returned from the Spirito Santo convent after the conclusion of her studies in 1704 and announced to her father and brothers her intention of becoming a Capuchin Poor Clare nun on 21 December 1704. Her confessor and house servants as well as her father and siblings opposed this move when she made it public. Despite this on Christmas 1704 she went to the Capuchin Poor Clare convent of Santa Maria della Neve and presented herself to them with the words: "I want to become holy". However she was required to undergo a period of probation which was conducted in the Ursuline-run Maggi College.

Once she entered the convent at the age of eighteen she was described to be "like wax" for her delicate appearance. On 8 September 1705 she was clothed in the habit and assumed the religious name of "Maria Maddalena" and parted with her father and brothers and of the event said: "O God! How upset I was". Martinengo was later deemed to be unfit for the Capuchin life but with a change in mistress she received unanimous support in a later ballot. She made her solemn profession on 8 September 1706.

In 1708 a Jesuit priest gave a series of spiritual exercises that were Jansenistic in nature. She feared divine judgment so much that she contracted a grave fever that left her confined to her bed for a brief period of time.

Her confessor instructed her to compile notes of her life and experiences and she decided to do so in the spirit of obedience. She was appointed as the Mistress of Novices at the age of 36 and made abbess in 1732; she was re-elected in that post on 12 July 1736.

Martinengo died of tuberculosis in 1737 and when news of her death spread across Brescia people across the entire area mourned her. Her remains are located in the church of the convent of the Capuchin Poor Clare nuns in Via Arimanno 17 in Brescia.

== Beatification ==
The process for her beatification commenced under Pope Clement XIII on 1 September 1762 and allowed for the commencement of two diocesan processes to be held in the Diocese of Brescia for the evaluation of her time as a professed religious and to investigate the manner in which she conducted her life.

On 5 May 1778 she was proclaimed to be Venerable after Pope Pius VI recognized the fact that Martinengo had lived a model life of heroic virtue which he deemed she had exemplified to a favorable degree.

The recognition of two miracles attributed to her direct intercession allowed for Pope Leo XIII to preside over her beatification on 9 June 1900. The miracles in question concerned the healings of Isabella Groppelli Gromi and of the future priest Giuseppe Tosi.

The cause for her canonization was opened on 13 May 1901.
