= John Lloyd (bishop of St Davids) =

Welsh bishop and principal (1638–1687)

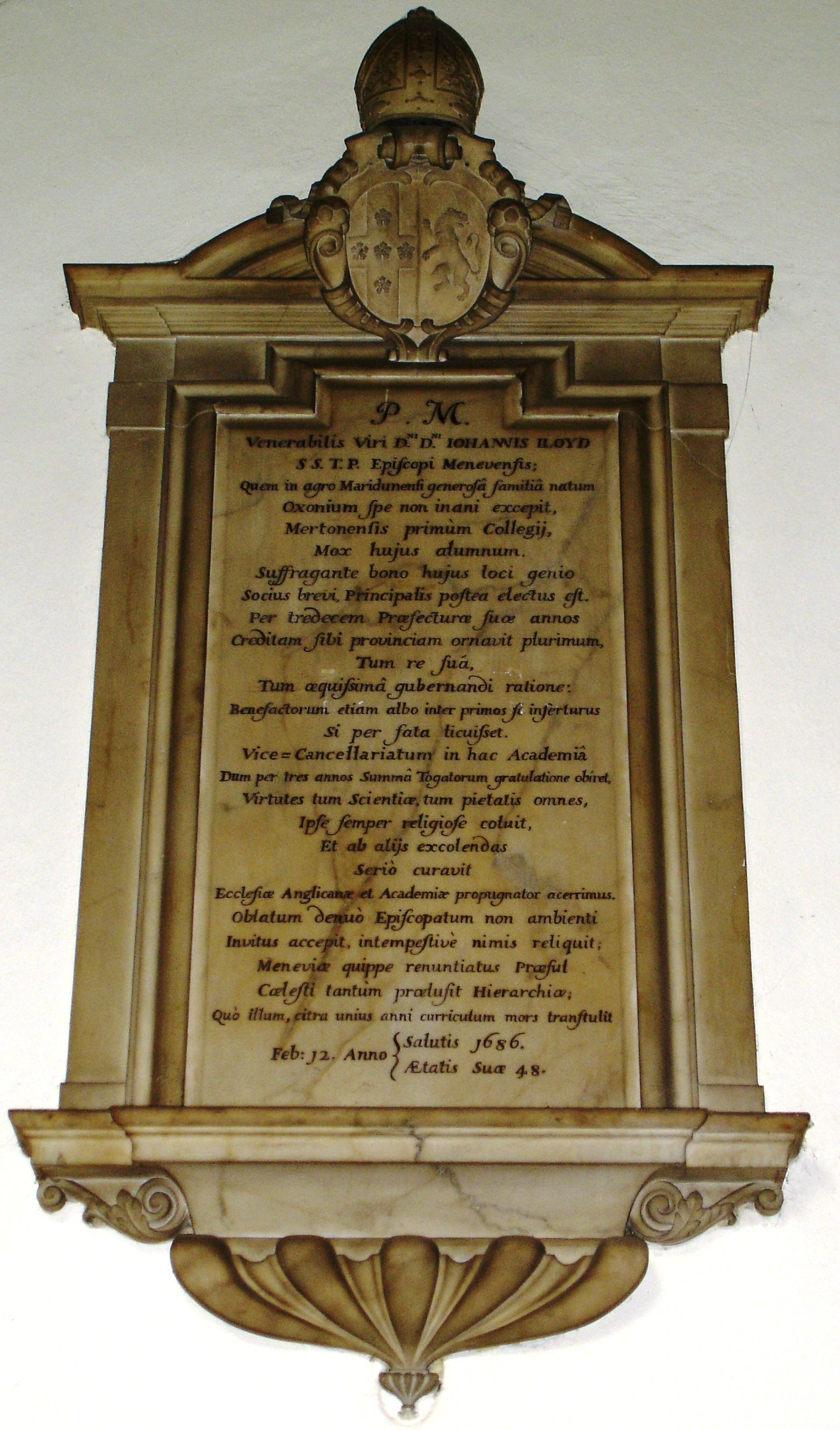
Lloyd's memorial in the chapel at Jesus College, Oxford

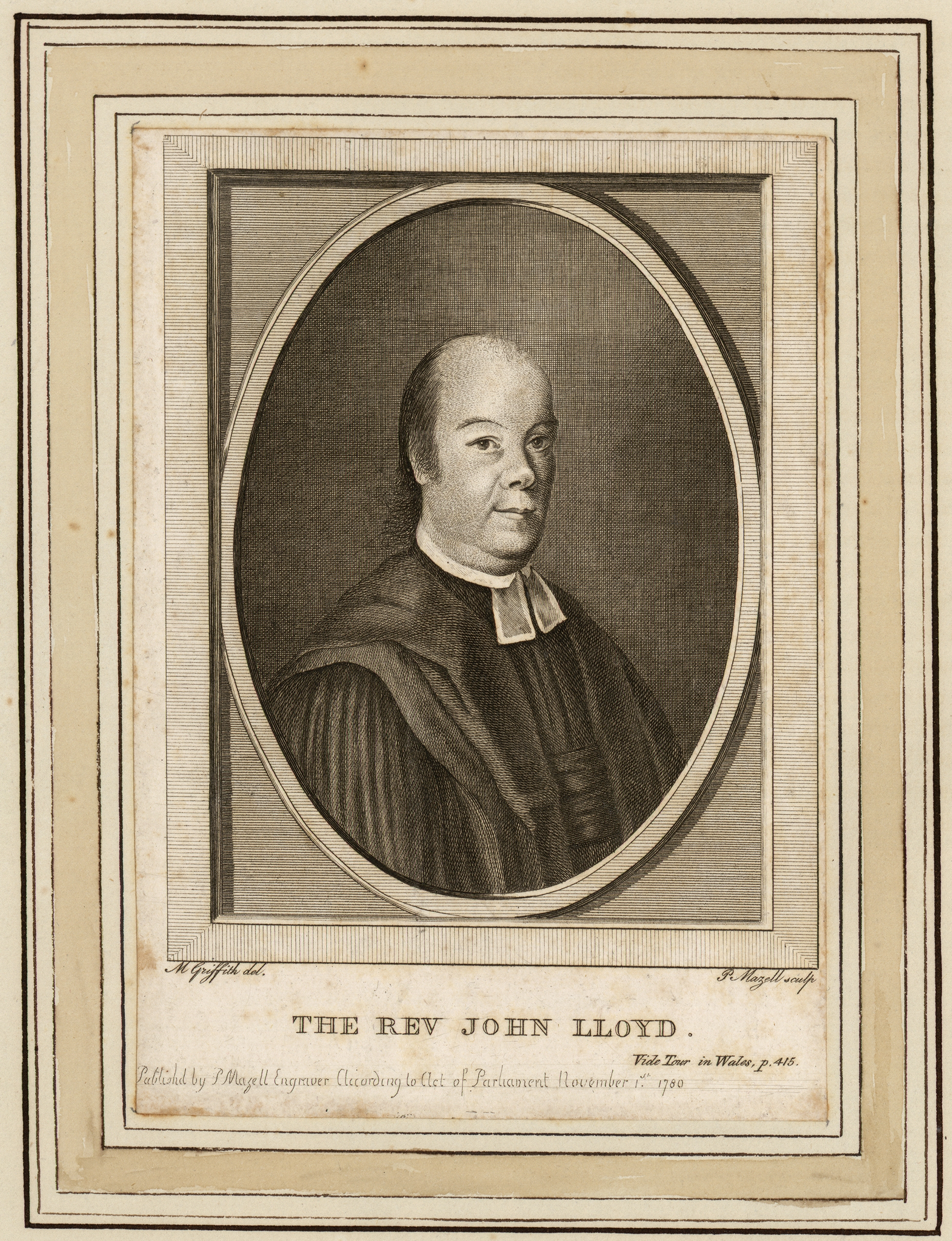
Rev. John Lloyd

John Lloyd (1638 – 13 February 1687), born at Pendine, Carmarthenshire, Wales, the son of Morgan Lloyd, was principal of Jesus College, Oxford, vice-chancellor of the University of Oxford and Bishop of St David's.

== Life ==
Lloyd studied at Merton College, Oxford, from 1657 onwards, gaining his BA in 1659. He was awarded further degrees of MA in 1662, BD in 1670 and DD in 1674. He became a Fellow of Jesus College in 1661. In 1672, he was appointed precentor of Llandaff Cathedral, later being appointed Treasurer (1679). In 1673, he was elected principal in succession to Sir Leoline Jenkins.

He served as vice-chancellor of University of Oxford between 1682 and 1685. He was already in failing health when he reluctantly accepted the post of Bishop of St David's, and was consecrated on 17 October 1686 – the evidence does not suggest that he ever visited his diocese. He resigned his position as principal when appointed Bishop. He died at Jesus College four months later and was buried in the chapel.

== Footnotes ==
Academic offices
Preceded by Timothy Halton	Vice-Chancellor of Oxford University; 1682–1685	Succeeded by Timothy Halton
Church of England titles
Preceded by Laurence Womock	Bishop of St David's; 1686–1687	Succeeded by Thomas Watson
