= Parks in Okara =

Collage of parks on Okara

Okara, a city in the province of Punjab, Pakistan is home to numerous parks. Among the most well-known are Farid-ud-Din Water Park and Joyland, Rides and Tides, which offer recreational activities for families. Other notable parks include Safdar Shaheed Park (commonly known as Company Bagh), Mian Muhammad Zaman Public Park, Jinnah Park Okara, Family Park, and Ladies Park. Additionally, Okara has more than fifteen smaller parks scattered throughout the city.

== Farid-ud-Din Water Park ==
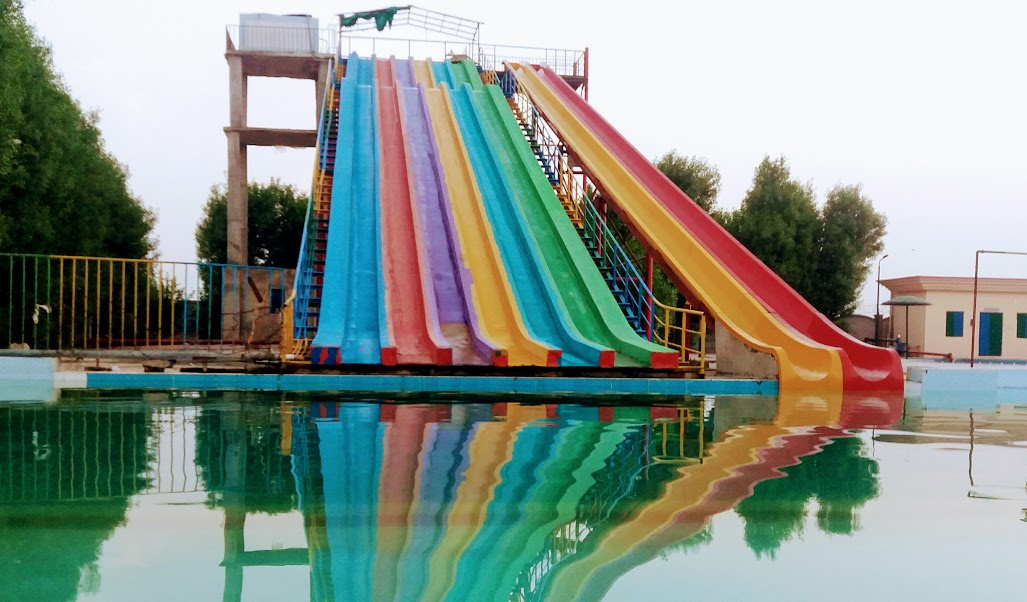
Farid-ud-Din Water Park

Farid-ud-Din Water Park and Joyland Okara is named after the renowned Sufi saint, Farid-u-Din Ganj Shakar (R.A.). It is the only water park in Okara and was established in 2014. The park is located near the Okara Bypass on N-5 (National Highway 5), Okara, and operates as a private facility.

Farid-ud-Din Water Park covers an area of approximately 24,281.1 square metres and is divided into three sections: one for swimming pools, another for amusement rides called Joyland, and a third section known as Play Land, specifically designed for children.

The park features three swimming pools, each with a depth of 4.9 feet. Two of the pools remain open throughout the year, while the third is reserved for special occasions such as Eid-ul-Fitr, Eid-ul-Adha, Independence Day, and other celebrations. There are a total of eight slides leading into one of the pools, six of which have curved designs.

Joyland offers various amusement rides, including a swing boat, a paratrooper swing, a flying carpet swing, and an octopus swing. Additionally, there is a small train named Data Express. Play Land caters to children, providing attractions such as electric cars, video games, and other enjoyable activities for youngsters.

A small mosque is also present within the park premises for offering prayers. Farid-ud-Din Water Park typically opens at 11:00 AM and closes at 11:00 PM. The park employs a staff of approximately ten people.

== Safdar Shaheed ==
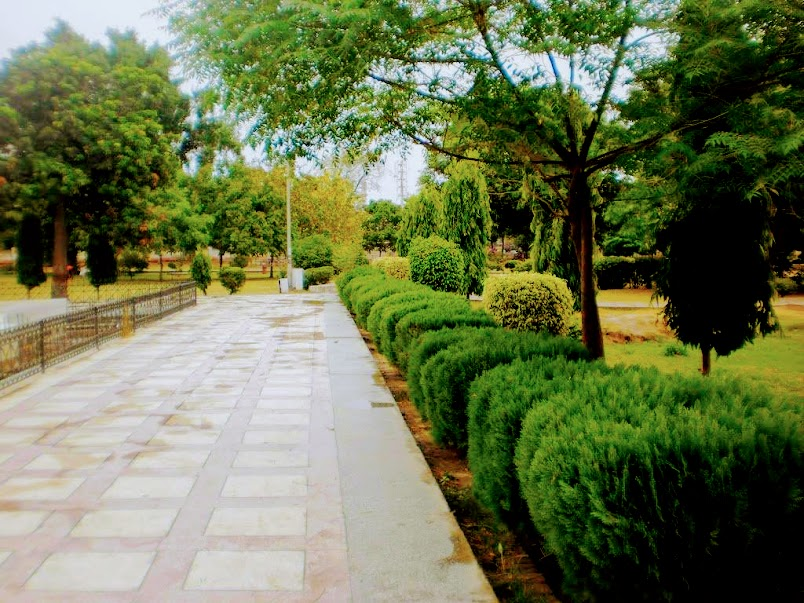
Safdar Shaheed Park (Company Bagh)

Safdar Shaheed Park, commonly known as Company Bagh, is the largest and most prominent park in Okara. It is located on Tehsil Road, Okara. Originally established before the partition of the subcontinent, the park was known as Company Bagh until 1988, when it was renamed Safdar Shaheed Park in honour of Captain Safdar Shaheed. The park is managed by the Municipal Corporation of Okara and covers an area of approximately 32,400 square metres.

Safdar Shaheed Park features grassy plots, seasonal and ornamental plants, and water bodies. Benches are placed throughout the park to provide seating, and there are two jogging tracks—the first is a 0.8 km-long soil track, while the second is a 1.5 km-long track paved with tuff tiles. The park also has two fountains and three gazebos for visitors.

There are three entrances to Safdar Shaheed Park — two designated for public use and one exclusively for the Municipal Corporation Administration to facilitate maintenance work. The park is illuminated at night and equipped with two washrooms and three water fountains. To maintain cleanliness and security, the park employs two security guards, three sanitation workers, and four gardeners.

Safdar Shaheed Park is enclosed by a boundary wall and was last renovated in 2005. It is estimated that more than 3,000 visitors frequent the park daily, including walkers and school groups. The park remains open 24 hours a day, welcoming people of all ages.

== Jinnah Park ==
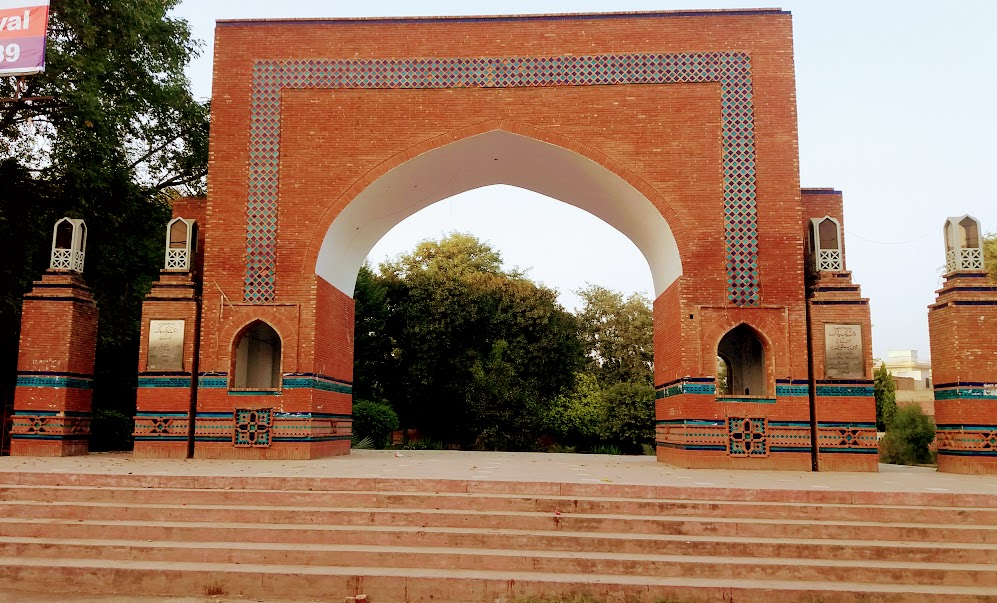
Jinnah Park Okara

Jinnah Park is the second-largest park in Okara, located on Benazir Road, along 4-L Minor at Jahaz Chowk, Okara. The park covers an area of approximately 23,466 square metres. After the partition, the land where Jinnah Park is situated became the property of the Evacuee Trust Property Board. Initially, a park named Pehlwanawala Park was established on this land.

In 1993, the then Minister of Sports, Culture, and Tourism, Rao Sikandar Iqbal, redeveloped the park for the public. On 5 April 1996, Rao Sikandar Iqbal laid the foundation stone for the park, which was subsequently renamed Jinnah Park. Later, on 21 August 1996, the park was formally inaugurated by the then Prime Minister of Pakistan, Benazir Bhutto. Jinnah Park is now managed by the Municipal Corporation of Okara.

Jinnah Park features lush grassy areas, seasonal and perennial plants, and is enclosed by a boundary wall. It is equipped with public benches, two washrooms, and over ten water fountains. The park has a 0.5 km-long central walking track and a 0.7 km-long side jogging track. There are two entrances to the park, providing easy access for visitors.

The maintenance of Jinnah Park is managed by two sanitation workers and two gardeners. The park is frequently visited by school children, and at times, funeral prayers are also offered within the park premises. Jinnah Park remains open to the public 24 hours a day, welcoming visitors of all ages.

== Mian Muhammad Zaman Public Park Okara ==
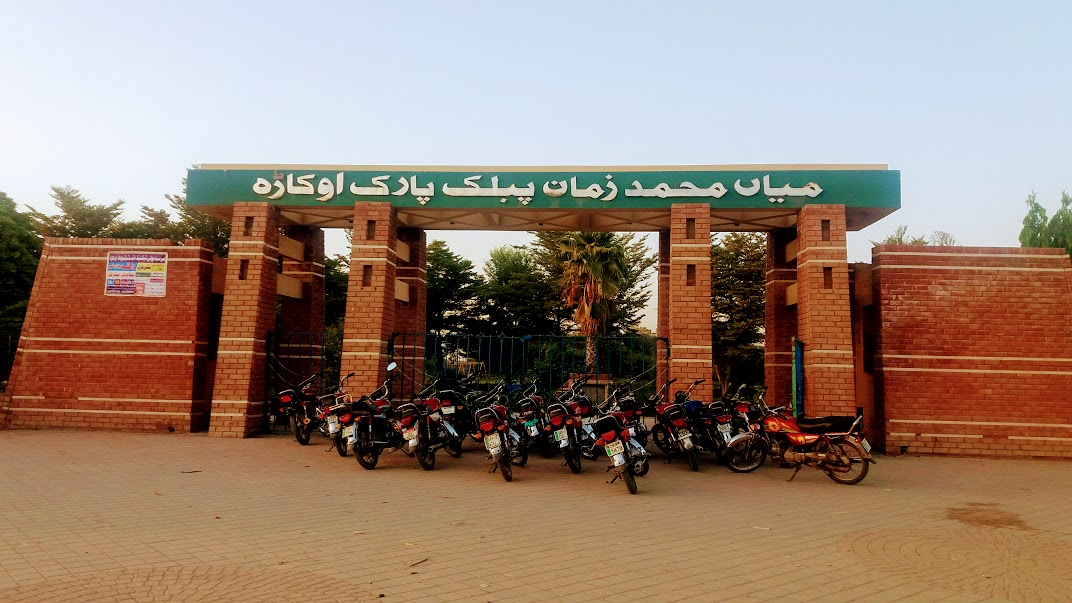
Mian Muhammad Zaman Public Park

Mian Muhammad Zaman Public Park is located on Akbar Road, with one side situated along Rao Sikandar Iqbal Road. The park is adjacent to the LBDC Canal and 4-L Minor Canal, and is in the vicinity of Rides and Tides Okara.

The park was established in 2011 and was originally named Okara Public Park as an initiative of the then District Coordination Officer, Capt (r) Saif Anjum. The park covers an area of approximately 24,281 square metres. Before being converted into a park, the land was known as Mall Mandi and was used as a landfill station for waste from Okara city.

In 2013, the park was renamed Mian Muhammad Zaman Public Park by Mian Yawar Zaman, the former Provincial Minister of Punjab for Irrigation, in honour of his father, Mian Muhammad Zaman, a former state minister.

Mian Muhammad Zaman Public Park features grassy plots, seasonal and perennial plants, benches, and several swings. A hill within the park houses two gazebos. The park also has a walking track and a small mosque.

The park is maintained by one sanitation worker and one gardener. Since the park lacks nighttime lighting, it is only open to the public during daylight hours.

== Rides and Tides Okara ==
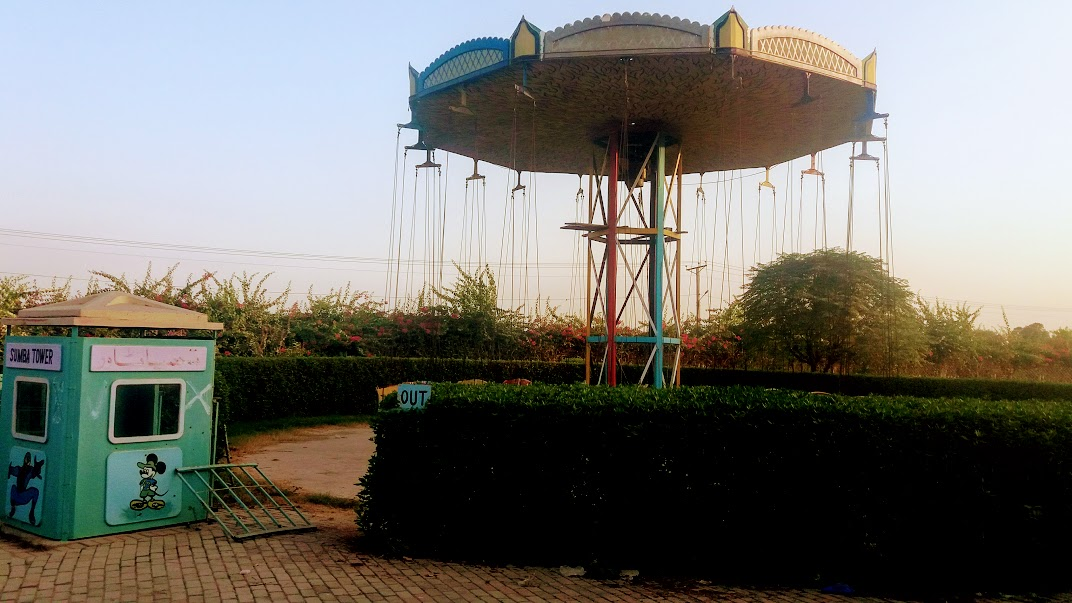
Rides And Tides Okara

Rides and Tides is a family amusement park located on Akbar Road in Okara. It was established in 2013 by the Inter Gain Group of Companies, with the support of the local district government of Okara. The park occupies an area of approximately 10,117.1 square metres and is adjacent to Mian Muhammad Zaman Park in Okara.

Rides and Tides is best known for its variety of amusement rides. The Ferris wheel is the main attraction, while other popular rides include the Pirate ship, Octopus, Flying Chopper, T Cup, Baggi Ride, and Sumba Tower. The park also features a small train and a Play Land area for children.

Each ride has its own small ticket house, which is typically open only during special events. The park employs more than ten workers. Currently, Rides and Tides is closed due to a land dispute with the government.
