= Mustafabad =

Mustafabad or Mustafaabad may refer to:

== India ==
- Mustafabad, Delhi, a census town
  - Mustafabad Assembly constituency
- Mustafabad, Haryana, now Saraswati Nagar, a town in Yamunanagar district
- Mustafabad, Kapurthala, a village in Punjab state, India

== Iran ==
- Mostufaabad, a village in Khuzestan province

== Pakistan ==
- Mustafaabad, Bhakkar, a village in Punjab
- Mustafaabad, Kasur, a city in Punjab
- Mustafabad, Lahore, commonly called Dharampura, a neighbourhood in Punjab
- Mustafabad, Okara, a town in Punjab
