= Kaluwal Mittha =

Kaluwal Mittha کالووال مٹھا
- Villages
- Location in Punjab, Pakistan
- Coordinates: 31.02077°N 73.632365°E
- Country: Pakistan
- Province: Punjab
- District: Okara
- Tehsil: Renala Khurd
- Union Council: UC-54

Government
  - Chairman: Mehmood Ul Hassan Haideri, Babar Chaudhary.

Languages
  - Official: Punjabi
  - Other spoken: Urdu
- Time zone: UTC+5 (PST)
- Postel Code: 56131
- Website: kaluwalmittha.blogspot.com

Kaluwal Mittha (کالووال مٹھا) are two small villages in Renala Khurd, Okara District, Punjab, Pakistan. It is located 22 kilometres (14 mi) from Renala Khurd, 38 kilometres (24 mi) away from district headquarters Okara.

== Near cities ==
- Renala Khurd
- Okara City
- Dipalpur

== Villages nearby ==
- Mittha Bhatti
- Bama Bala
- Chuchak
- Kamman
- Bazida
- K plot
- Thatti Kalasan
- Islampur
- Chak 4GD
- Chak 3GD Lahori Wala
- Chak 2GD Lasian Wala
- Thatta Bhattian
- Sakhi Abdaal

== Kaluwal Cricket Team ==
Kaluwal Cricket King XI Team of Young Boys to Play Cricket With Other Village Cricket Team

== Kaluwal Masjid ==
Jamia Masjid Faizan e Madina Kaluwal
