= Chak 10/1 AL =

Chak 10/1 AL (Urdu: چک نمبر 10 ون اے ايل) is a village in Okara District, in Punjab province, Pakistan. It is located almost 13 kilometres from Renala Khurd.

== See also ==
- Renala Khurd
