= Yawar =

Yawar may refer to:

- Yawar, Papua New Guinea, coastal village in Papua New Guinea
- Yawar Rural LLG, subdistrict in Papua New Guinea
- Yawar Q'asa
- Aristolochia didyma or Yawar Panga, a plant found in South America
- Yawar, a given name usually used by Muslims that means "helpful"
- Yawar Ziwa, an uthra in Mandaeism

== People ==
- Ghazi Mashal Ajil al-Yawer (born 1958), Iraqi political figure
- Yawar Hayat Khan (born 1943)
- Yawar Saeed (1935–2015), former Pakistani cricketer
- Mian Yawar Zaman (born 1961), Pakistani politician
- Ali Yavar Jung (1906–1976), Indian diplomat
