= Kaluwal Okara =

Kaluwal کالووال
- Village
- Location in Punjab, Pakistan
- Coordinates: 31.02077°N 73.632365°E
- Country: Pakistan
- Province: Punjab
- District: Okara
- Tehsil: Renala Khurd
- Union Council: UC-54

Government
  - Members District Council: Mehmood Ul Hassan Haideri, Zaheer Babar

Population
  - Total: 2,611

Languages
  - Official: Punjabi
  - Other spoken: Urdu, English
- Time zone: UTC+5 (PST)
- Postal Code: 56131
- Website: kaluwalmittha.blogspot.com

Kaluwal (کالووال) is a small village in Renala Khurd, Okara District, Punjab, Pakistan. It is located 22 kilometres (14 mi) from Renala Khurd, 38 kilometres (24 mi) away from Okara District.

== Near cities ==
- Renala Khurd
- Okara City
- Dipalpur

== Near Villages ==
- Mittha Bhatti
- Bama Bala
- Chuchak
- Kamman
- Bazida
- K plot
- Thatti Kalasan
- Islampur
- Chak 4GD
- Chak 3GD Lahori Wala
- Chak 2GD Lasian Wala
- Thatta Bhattian
- Sakhi Abdaal

== Languages ==
Punjabi and Urdu are the most widely used languages of the residents. Younger generateions are also well conversant with English.

== Crops ==
The land is very fertile and rich in production of various crops such as wheat, sugarcane, cotton, and vegetables. People often keep livestock including buffaloes, cows, sheep and goats, and poultry including chicken, and ducks, for milk, meat and eggs.

== Economics ==
The fertile soil in the region surrounding the village of Kaluwal has created an economy dependent on agriculture, as it is located near a Doab (a confluence of two or more rivers). However, availability of agricultural land is limited due to the tightly packed farms of neighboring villages, which has led local people to pursue other fields such as business and government jobs.

== Politics ==
Zaheer Babar Chaudhary is a Govt Chairman Of Kaluwal and Waseem Abbas support politically.

== Sports ==
Sports are a big source of entertainment, especially among local youth. Cricket is the most popular sport. The local boys' high school is used as the center of sporting activities because there are no dedicated facilities for sports events. Young students often organize sports with neighboring villages on their own initiative.

== Dak khana (Post Office) ==
Kaluwal Address Moza Kaluwal Dak Khana Khas Tehsil Renala Khurd District Okara Punjab Pakistan Tehsil Renala Khurd Postal Code 56131
