= Jaboka =

Coordinates: 30°57′38″N 73°27′10″E

جبوكہ
- Town and union council
- Jaboka
- Interactive map of جبوكہ
- Country: Pakistan
- Region: Punjab
- District: Okara District
- Time zone: UTC+5 (PST)
- Postal code: 56290
- Area code: 0442

Jaboka (Urdu: جبوكہ) is a town and union council (UC No. 9) in Okara District, Punjab province of Pakistan. It is situated at an altitude of 161 metres (531 feet) and is one of the larger towns of Okara district. Jaboka serves as a commercial and educational hub for over 20 surrounding villages. It is home to markets for garments, cosmetics, jewelry, and shoes.

The town derived its name from the people who lived in the area 70 to 80 years prior, who were referred to as "Jaboka." It boasts two historic buildings constructed in the early 20th century and has a population of approximately 60,000.

Jaboka is inhabited by a diverse population, including the Jat, Rao, Rana, Arain, Watto,Rai,and Kharal castes. There are four government schools in the town, two for boys and two for girls. Additionally, there is a Baharia Foundation College (BFC), established on 15 April 2013, and the Shaheen-e-Millat Model Secondary School, a private school affiliated with the Punjab Education Foundation (PEF), founded in 1994. Surrounding villages

- Chak 14 GD Tehsildar
- Mujahid Pura
- Lahi Fazil Shah
- KHo Pak Darbar
- Chak 16 GD Maddoka
- Naul Plot
- Nankabad
- Chak 18Gd
- Bibi Pur
- Satghara
- Chak 25GD
- Chak 16 1R
- Bakhshu
- Feroz
- Jandraka
- Joyia
- 12 GD
- Chak 17 1R
- 14 Gd Raza Abad
- Barungpur
- Kot Sultanpur
- Chak 25 Gd
- Chak 15 GD
- Fojian
- Chak 36 A-GD
- History

Jaboka's documented history is intertwined with the colonial development of Okara as a canal colony under British rule in the early 20th century (circa 1910–1920). The town emerged as a settlement for Jat agrarian communities, with its name possibly derived from a local tribe or clan known as "Jaboka". Two preserved historic buildings from this era—likely colonial-era havelis or administrative structures—serve as architectural landmarks, though detailed records are limited. The broader Okara District's history includes Mughal and Sikh influences, with nearby sites like the 13th-century Tomb of Hazrat Ghous Muhammad Bala Pir in Satghara highlighting early Islamic heritage. Post-1947 partition, Jaboka integrated into Pakistan's administrative framework, with Okara District formalized in 1982 from Sahiwal District.

- Economy

Jaboka functions as a trade nexus for its rural hinterland, with vibrant bazaars specializing in garments, cosmetics, jewellery, and footwear. The local economy is agriculture-centric, leveraging Okara's reputation for cotton processing, vegetable exports, and dairy. Remittances from overseas workers in the Gulf states supplement household incomes, while small-scale industries like textile weaving and food processing are emerging. Unemployment stands at 5–7%, with youth migration to urban centers like Lahore a noted challenge. Initiatives such as the Punjab Kisan Card (farmer credit scheme) and solar irrigation projects are boosting resilience as of
