= Thatta Ghulamka =

Village in Pakistan

- Union Council
- Thatta Ghulamka
- Location within Punjab, Pakistan Location within Pakistan
- Coordinates: 30°58′59.5″N 73°21′43″E
- Country: Pakistan
- Province: Punjab
- District: Okara
- Tehsil: Okara

Government
- Elevation: 105 m (344 ft)

Population (2017 Census)
  - Total: 1,3832,017
- Time zone: UTC+5 (PST)
- Calling code: 044

Thatta Ghulamka Dhiroka (Urdu ٹھٹھہ غلام کا دھیروکا), known as Doll village of Pakistan, is a village in Okara District of Pakistani Punjab. It is situated 27 km from Okara city on the Faisalabad-Okara Road, and 7 km from Bangala Gogera stop on Faisalabad-Okara Road. It is 91 km from Faisalabad International Airport, 190 km from the province capital Lahore and 400 km from Pakistan's capital Islamabad.

== Toy village of Pakistan ==
Thatta Kedona, Doll Village or Toy Village of Pakistan. (Urdu گڑیوں کا گاؤں ) In this village, people make handmade traditional Punjabi dolls and other toys as per Pakistani culture and art work exported all over the world. In the 1990s, famous German artist and designer Senta Maria Anna Siller visited Pakistan with her husband on request of their student Amjad Ali. On this visit, they saw a handmade doll made by a local woman, which gave Siller the ambition to empower this village. She lived in Pakistan for almost five years around 1993, to support the women of the village through handicrafts.

== Award ==
Senta Maria Anna Siller, founder of the doll village, had her services known for transforming a village in Punjab with her vision and training of the local girls to make and sell their dolls awarded by Governor of Punjab Chaudhry Mohammad Sarwar.
