= Youngpur =

Village in Okara District, Pakistan

Coordinates: 30°55′N 73°23′E

Youngpur Urdu: ینگ پور) is a large village 15 km from Okara city on Faisalabad road. It has a total population of over 20000, including 6500 registered voters. It is a part of Okara District, Pakistan.

== History ==
As per legend Young pur was named after an English army remount officer Mr Young prior to the partition of India. It was basically a residential area for remount officers and their labor. It was populated mainly by the migrants of India.

== Geographical position ==
Youngpur is located 160 km away from Lahore and 87 km away from Faisalabad and comes in Punjab. Faisalabad Road lining Okara to Faisalabad pass through the village which contributed to the prosperity of the village, and leading to quick communication with the city. Bahadarnagar Farm is the neighbouring Government research farm which is only 4 km away from the village.

== Structure ==
The village is a square if viewed from above. That is because of the planned structure by the British. All the roads in the village are straight and wide even the Okara city cannot compete with it. Though there has always been a drainage problem. The village grew from only some streets but now covers all of the space available for the houses including Shamlat, though uneven division of plots has led to houses of only some meter square leading to high population density in the area. Youngpur has two schools, one for boys and other is for girls.

== Details ==
Youngpur has 90 murabas of cultivated land that is equal to 2250 acre, though the locals have brought a lot of land in the neighboring villages. The main source of income is agriculture either directly or indirectly. A large amount of work force is utilized by the workshops and different kinds of shops, it is one of the only self-sufficient villages in the area. There are also a large number of shops on the Faisalabad Road whose number only the cities or major towns can match.
