= Satghara =

Pakistani administrative area

Coordinates: 30°55′N 73°31′E

ستگهره
- Town and union council
- Interactive map of ستگهره
- Country: Pakistan
- Region: Punjab
- District: Okara District
- Time zone: UTC+5 (PST)

Satghara (Urdu: ستگهره) is a town and union council of Okara District in the Punjab province of Pakistan. It is located at 30°55'0N 73°31'0E at an altitude of 164 metres (541 feet). The town is also associated with the tomb of Baloch leader Mir Chakar Rind and nearby archaeological remains, including a historic fort and settlement mound.

== History ==
Satghara has documented historical and archaeological significance, with surveys and excavations in the area identifying settlement remains, ceramics, and structural features indicating prolonged occupation during the medieval period. The site includes a fortified enclosure and a central tomb attributed to Mir Chakar Rind, a prominent Baloch leader. Earlier archaeological work, including surveys by M. Rafique Mughal in 1971–72, documented cultural material from the site and the surrounding mound (locally known as a tibba), suggesting earlier phases of habitation. Mounds of brick debris at Satghara mark the site of a forgotten town, the coins found at Satghara prove that it was inhabited during the Kushan dynasty. In recent years, conservation efforts have been undertaken to preserve the tomb and associated historic structures, including surrounding walls and access areas.

== Etymology ==
The name of this town "Satghara" is commonly believed to drive its name from words (Saat or Seven) (Ghara or pitchers) or (ghars or homes). Another sound historical folklore is narrated that some injured soldiers of Alexander the Great (belonging to ancient town of Stageira of Macedonia) resided their and they named this ancient town as Stageira now corrupted as Satghara.

== Geography ==
It is located at 30°55'0N 73°31'0E with an altitude of 164 metres (541 feet).

== Demographics ==
Satghara is a harmonious town where diverse cultures converge seamlessly. The community comprises native groups such as Arain, Jatt, Rajput, Syeds, Dogars, Gujjars, Rehmani, Mughal, Ansari, and other castes.Many of Mir Chakar e Azam's descendants as well as sub tribes of Baloch descent predominate in the district. This inclusive mix of people from various backgrounds fosters a cohesive and welcoming atmosphere throughout the town.

== Culture ==
In the heart of this cultural diversity, Satghara is adorned with shrines dedicated to Muslim scholars. These sacred places not only serve as spiritual centers but also create an ambiance where different religious and cultural expressions peacefully coexist, enriching the fabric of community life.

== Nearby villages ==
Satghara is a historic town and union council in Okara District, located at coordinates 30°55'0"N 73°31'0"E, near the Ravi River. It is known for the tomb of Hazrat Ghous Muhammad Bala Pir, a revered Sufi saint. Based on mapping and geographic data, here are some of the closest nearby villages (primarily agricultural settlements often referred to as "Chak" numbers in the region's canal colony system), within approximately 10 km:

- Chak 14 GD Tehsildar, A village about 4 km northwest of Satghara.
- Sangoga, A small village roughly 5 km south.
- Budheywala, Located around 5 km north.
- Chak 17 1R, Approximately 4 Km.
- Mustafabad, A village and union council about 3 km southwest (also considered a small town).
- Chak 4 GD, A village about 10 km northeast, in a fertile area near the Lower Bari Doab Canal.

== Nearby towns and villages ==
For broader context, these larger settlements are also in close proximity:

- Renala Khurd, A town and tehsil headquarters, about 9 km southeast.
- Okara City, The district capital, approximately 17 km south.

These villages are part of the densely populated rural landscape of Okara District, with many focused on agriculture along the Ravi River and canal systems.
