= Muhammad Nagar =

Town in Punjab, Pakistan

Coordinates: 30°34′36″N 73°58′37″E

مُحَمَّد نگر
- Town
- Muhammad Nagar (Kirian wali)
- Interactive map of مُحَمَّد نگر
- Country: Pakistan
- Province: Okara District
- District: Okara

Population
  - Urban: 32,000
- Time zone: UTC+5 (PST)

Muhammad Nagar (Urdu: مُحَمَّد نگر) is a town and union council of Depalpur Tehsil in Okara District of Punjab province, Pakistan.

The town is located at 30°34'36N 73°58'37E.
