= Renala Khurd Tehsil =

Renala Khurd Tehsil تحصیل رینالہ خورد
- Tehsil
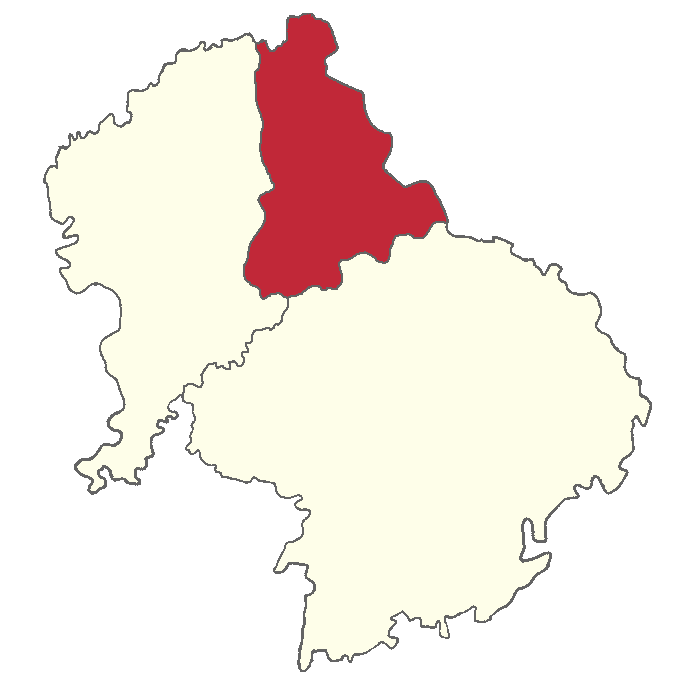
- Country: Pakistan
- Region: Punjab
- District: Okara District
- Capital: Renala Khurd
- Union councils: 18
- Time zone: UTC+5 (PST)

Renala Khurd is an administrative subdivision (tehsil) of Okara District in the Punjab province of Pakistan. It is administratively subdivided into 18 Union Councils, two of which form the tehsil capital Renala Khurd.

Renala Khurd city was established in 1914. Before that time, Mughal Emperor Akbar along with his son Saleem, later known as Emperor Jahangir, and the royal entourage stayed in Dipalpur and passed through this region to pay homage to Farid Ganj Shakar in 1578. Akbar named the corridor as 'Bari Doab' by combining the syllables of the names of two rivers, the Beas and Ravi, that bounded the belt.

Previously in this region there were acres of barren and unirrigated land with trees of malah, and it was formerly known as Malah Walah. A part of Renala Khurd is naturally deprived of the underground sweet water. People in this region rely on canals as the main source of irrigation, as tube-wells, unlike other parts of the district, only pour out salty water which spoils the land. Traces are also found of a long range of ruins, called Dhaya in local language, which, according to popular myth, are the remains of some unknown ancient city which may have been engulfed by the river Biyas. These ruins give a mysterious look – something like a blend of desert and tiny hills, and also serve as the hideout for thieves and robbers

In 1849, the British occupied this area. The British Indian Army built Canal Loar-Bari-Doo-Aab and colonies with the help of imported migrant labour employed to clear and develop the forest and scrub land. In the era of the British Raj, brilliant irrigation network of canals were established all over the Punjab and extending into Sindh.

After the 1947 partition, the Pakistan Army took control of the major portion of irrigated land left by the army of the British Raj on which it established its own farms and maintaining the tenants. One of the largest of these farms is that in Okara, spread over 17,000 acres (69 km2) of prime land.

The peasant migrants were promised ownership once it was rendered arable, but as it turned out to be the most fertile and rich of the provinces; the army reconsidered, retained ownership of the land and settled the migrants as tenants. In 1913, Renala Khurd Stud State Farm leased out 5,000 acres (20 km2) of land to the Punjab government to cater to the needs of the army for horses, fodder and dairy products, and the tenancy agreements continued. Renala Khurd is famous for its horses, and horses from Renala Khurd Stud State Farm have won international derby races many times.

== Administration ==
The city of Renala Khurd serves as the headquarters of Renala Khurd Tehsil, the city of Renala Khurd itself is administratively subdivided into two Union councils. Population of Tehsil Renala Khurd.4,43,000

== Agriculture ==
Renala Khurd is home to the food processing company "Mitchell's Fruit Farms Limited". It has orchards of guava & citrus running b/w the lower bari doab canal and the Multan Road, for about 8 miles all the way up to Okara bypass. This region is also well known as a major producer of sugarcane & rice. These crops can be cultivated due to abundance of water supplied by the lower bari doab canal & smaller water channels.

In winter many small farmers set up traditional ways of processing sugar cane. They extract its juice and add soda to produce molasses.

== Climate ==
Most areas in Renala Khurd experience fairly cool winters, often accompanied by rain. By mid-February the temperature begins to rise; springtime weather continues until mid-April, when the summer heat sets in.

The onset of the southwest monsoon is anticipated to reach Renala Khurd by May, but since the early 1970s the weather pattern has been irregular. The spring monsoon has either skipped over the area or has caused it to rain so hard that floods have resulted. June and July are oppressively hot. Although official estimates rarely place the temperature above 46 °C, newspaper sources claim that it reaches 51 °C and regularly carry reports about people who have succumbed to the heat. In August the oppressive heat is punctuated by the rainy season, referred to as barsat, which brings relief in its wake. The hardest part of the summer is then over, but cooler weather does not come until late October.

== Demographics ==
Renala Khurd, encompassing a radius of 7 km, is home to 72,724 people. The population of Renala Khurd is over 99% Muslim with a Sunni majority and Shia minority; there are also small non-Muslims groups of Christians, Hindus and Sikhs.

The major language spoken in the Renala Khurd is Punjabi (which is written in Perso-Arabic script, known as Shahmukhi in Pakistan) and Punjabis make up the largest ethnic group (overlap into neighbouring India). Punjabis themselves are a heterogeneous group comprising different tribes and communities, although caste in Renala Khurd has more to do with traditional occupations such as blacksmiths or artisans as opposed to rigid social stratifications.

The most important tribes within Renala Khurd include Rajputs, Syed, Jats, Arain, Gujjars and Gakhars. Smaller tribes include the Awans, Rawns, Kamboh, Bhutta, and Maliks.

The Punjabi dialects spoken in this region of the land have a common vocabulary and a shared heritage. The shared heritage also extends to a common faith, Islam. The people of Renala Khurd have also a shared spiritual experience, which has been disseminated by Tassawwaf and can be witnessed on the occasion of the Urs (remembrance fairs) held for the Sufi Saints Syed Abul Hassan Bin Usman Bin Ali Al-Hajweri (also known as Data Ganj Bukhsh) at Lahore, Mian Mir at Lahore, Shaikh Farid Shakar Ganj at Pakpattan, Bahaudin Zakria at Multan, Sakhi Sarwar Sultan at Dera Ghazi Khan, Shah Hussain at Lahore, Bulleh Shah at Kasur and Imam Bari (Bari Shah Latif) at Rawalpindi-Islamabad.

== Amenities ==
Renala Khurd is accessible through the historic Grand Trunk Road. Pakistan Railways provides an important mode of transportation for commuters in Renala Khurd. The railway connects the farthest corners of the country and brings them closer to Renala Khurd for business, sight seeing and education. The Renala Khurd Railway Station is located in the east side of the city, which was built during the British Colonial era. There are three railway gates in Renala Khurd. The city also contains a post office and two police stations (City Police Station and Sadar Police Station).

== Ghala Mandi ==
Ghala Mandi (Grain Market) Renala Khurd was established in 1914. Renala Khurd is important Tehsil of Okara. It has a popular Ghala Mandi (Grain Market) of Punjab which is Aktrabad Ghala Mandi (Grain Market). One of the first Physicians to start practicing in Renala Khurd, Dr Zaka Ullah, had his office in the Ghala Mandi. Dr Afzal Bhatti, the famous gastroenterologist and liver transplant physician, also belongs to Renala Khurd.

== Renala State Military Farm ==
The Renala State Military Farm was formerly known as Glaxo. A quarter of a century ago, Glaxo was a small British firm with its origins in the dried-milk, cream and butter business and most of its sales in antibiotics, respiratory drugs and nutritional supplements, which is now called Military Farms. It supplies milk packs for the entire Pakistan Army. Renala State Military Farms milk factory is located in Sathghara.

== Renala Khurd Hydropower Plant ==
Renala Khurd Hydropower Plant is one of the most popular hydroelectric stations of Pakistan. It is situated on Canal Loar-Bari-Doo-Aab. Sir Ganga Ram (1851–1927), a civil engineer and leading philanthropist of his time, established the Renala Khurd hydroelectric power station in 1925. In 1873, after a brief Service in Punjab Public Works Department, he devoted himself to practical farming. He obtained on lease from the government 50,000 acres (200 km^{2}) of barren, unirrigated land in Montgomery District, and within three years converted that vast desert into fields, irrigated by water lifted by a hydroelectric plant and running through a thousand miles of irrigation channels, all constructed at his own cost. This was the biggest private enterprise of the kind, unknown and unthought of in the country before. Sir Ganga Ram earned millions, most of which he gave to charity. In the words of Sir Malcolm Hailey, the Governor of Punjab at the time, "he won like a hero and gave like a Saint".

== Sanctuaries ==
Jamia Masjid Karimia Robina Town

Jamea Masjid Ghosea Rizwea Sadar Bazar

Jamea Masjid Ghosea Usmania Muslim Town

Jamea Masjid Abi Hurera

Jamea Um-ul-Qura (C Block)

Jamea Ehsan (B Block)

Jamea Usman (A Block)

Jamea Aisha (Ahle-Hadith girls' Islamic institute)

Masjid Samdea Salamea Basti Hazoor Sahib

Gole Masjid Ghalla Mandi

Jamea Mehmodea G T road

Imam Bargha Bait Ul Hussain

Jamea Fatmea (Shia girls' Islamic institute)

== Catholic Church of Our Lady of Fatima ==
The Catholic Church (Our Lady of Fatima Parish) is situated at the Mitchell's fruit farms. There is a nun's convent within the church compound. A boys school, a girls school and a hostel for boys is inside the compound.

This church made international news, when Reverend Father George Ibrahim (aged 38) was martyred; he was a serving parish priest. On the early hours of 5 July 2003, at about 2:00 a.m., the parish priest of the Catholic Church at the Mitchell's Fruit Farms, and his cook Pervaiz Masih were lying in the patio after returning from the DHQ (District Headquarters) Hospital in Okara around midnight. He had visited the hospital to inquire about Father Isaac's health. Half a dozen assailants entered his house and killed him on resisting.
