= Jandraka =

Coordinates: 31°04′N 73°27′E

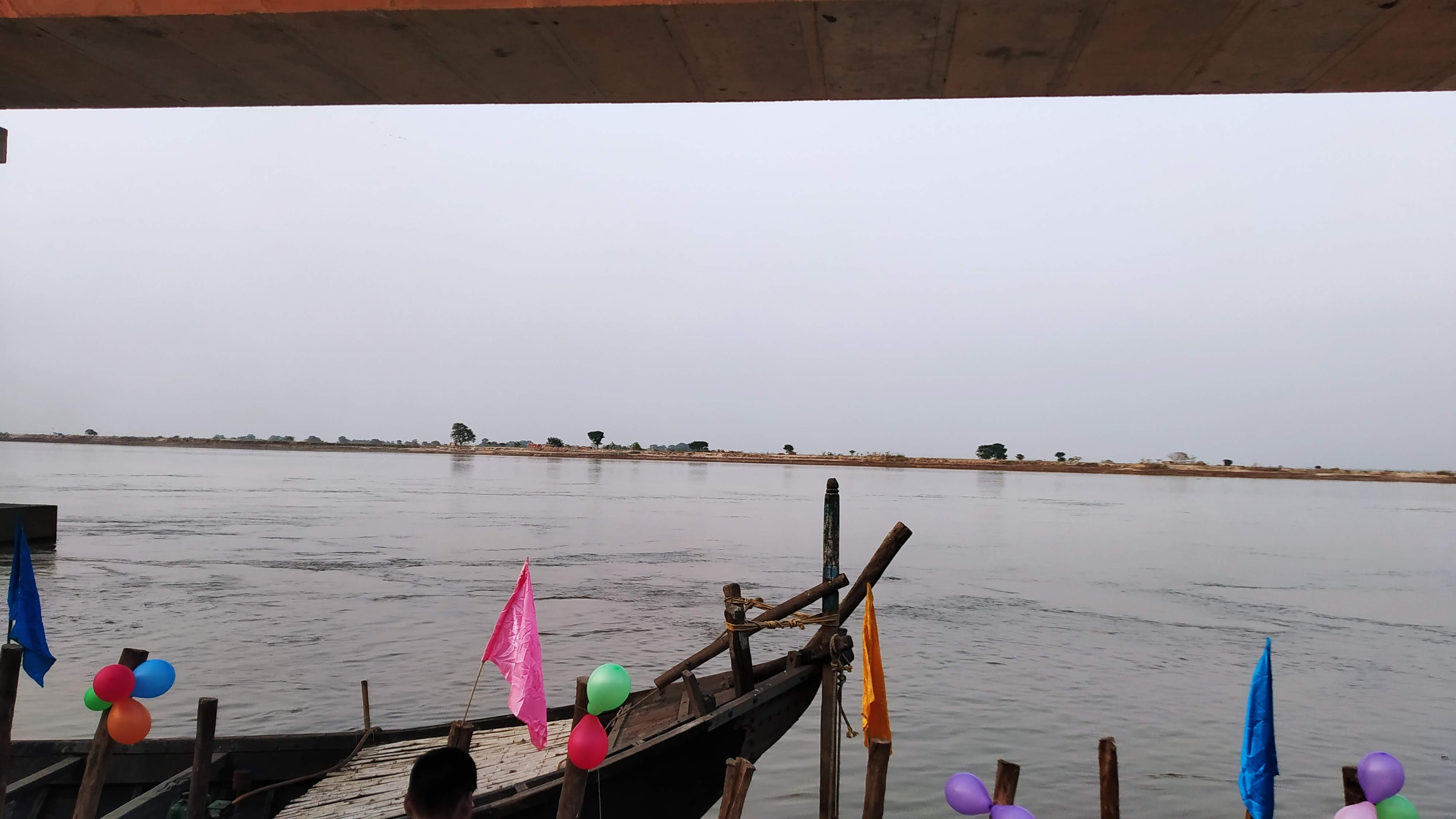
Ravi river in Jandraka

Jandraka is a union council roughly 34 km from the city of Okara, in Okara District of Punjab, Pakistan. It is situated on the bank of River Ravi. Its population is approximately 12859. It has a big main bazar and adjacent bus stand.

== Election 2002 ==
General elections were held on 10 Oct 2002. Rai Muhammad Aslam Kharal of PML-Q won by 50,106 votes.

== Election 2008 ==
General elections were held on 18 Feb 2008. Captain(R) Rai Ghulam Mujataba of PPP won by 63,960 votes.

Second highest vote were polled in favor of mr. Muhammad Aslam Khan Kharral of Pakistan Muslim League. He got 43798 votes.

== Election 2013 ==
General elections were held on 11 May 2013. Chaudhary Nadeem Abbas of PML-N won by 90,652 votes and became the member of National Assembly.

== General elections 2024 ==
In the general elections held on 8 February 2024, Pakistan went to the polls to elect the members of the 16th National Assembly. Independents affiliated with Imran Khan's Pakistan Tehreek-e-Insaf (PTI) emerged with the most directly elected seats (92), followed by the Pakistan Muslim League‑N (PML‑N) with 75 seats and the Pakistan People's Party (PPP) securing 54 seats. As no single party won a majority (133 seats), Nawaz Sharif's PML‑N entered coalition talks with the PPP to form a government.
