= Samina Noor =

Pakistani politician

Member of the Provincial Assembly of the Punjab
- In office 29 May 2013 – 31 May 2018
- Constituency: PP-185 (Okara-I)

Personal details
- Born: 13 July 1986 (age 40) Okara, Pakistan
- Party: Pakistan Muslim League (N)

Samina Noor (Urdu: سمینہ نور; born 13 July 1986) is a Pakistani politician who had been a Member of the Provincial Assembly of the Punjab, from May 2013 to May 2018.

== Early life and education ==
Noor was born on 13 July 1986 in Okara.

She received the degree of Bachelor of Arts (Hons) from Lahore College for Women University in 2010.

== Political career ==
She was elected to the Provincial Assembly of the Punjab as a candidate for Pakistan Muslim League (N) for Constituency PP-185 (Okara-I) in the 2013 Pakistani general election. She received 26,900 votes and defeated an independent candidate, Malik Muhammad Akram Bhatti.
