= Mustafabad, Okara =

Coordinates: 30°53′32″N 73°29′56″E

مُصطفےٰ آباد
- Town
- Mustafabad
- Interactive map of مُصطفےٰ آباد
- Country: Pakistan
- Province: Punjab
- District: Okara
- Time zone: UTC+5 (PST)

Mustafabad (Urdu: مُصطفےٰ آباد), is a town and union council of Depalpur Tehsil in Okara District of Punjab Province, Pakistan. It is located at 30°53'32N 73°29'56E and lies to the north-east of the district capital Okara.
