= Manam Motu =

Island in Papua New Guinea

Manam
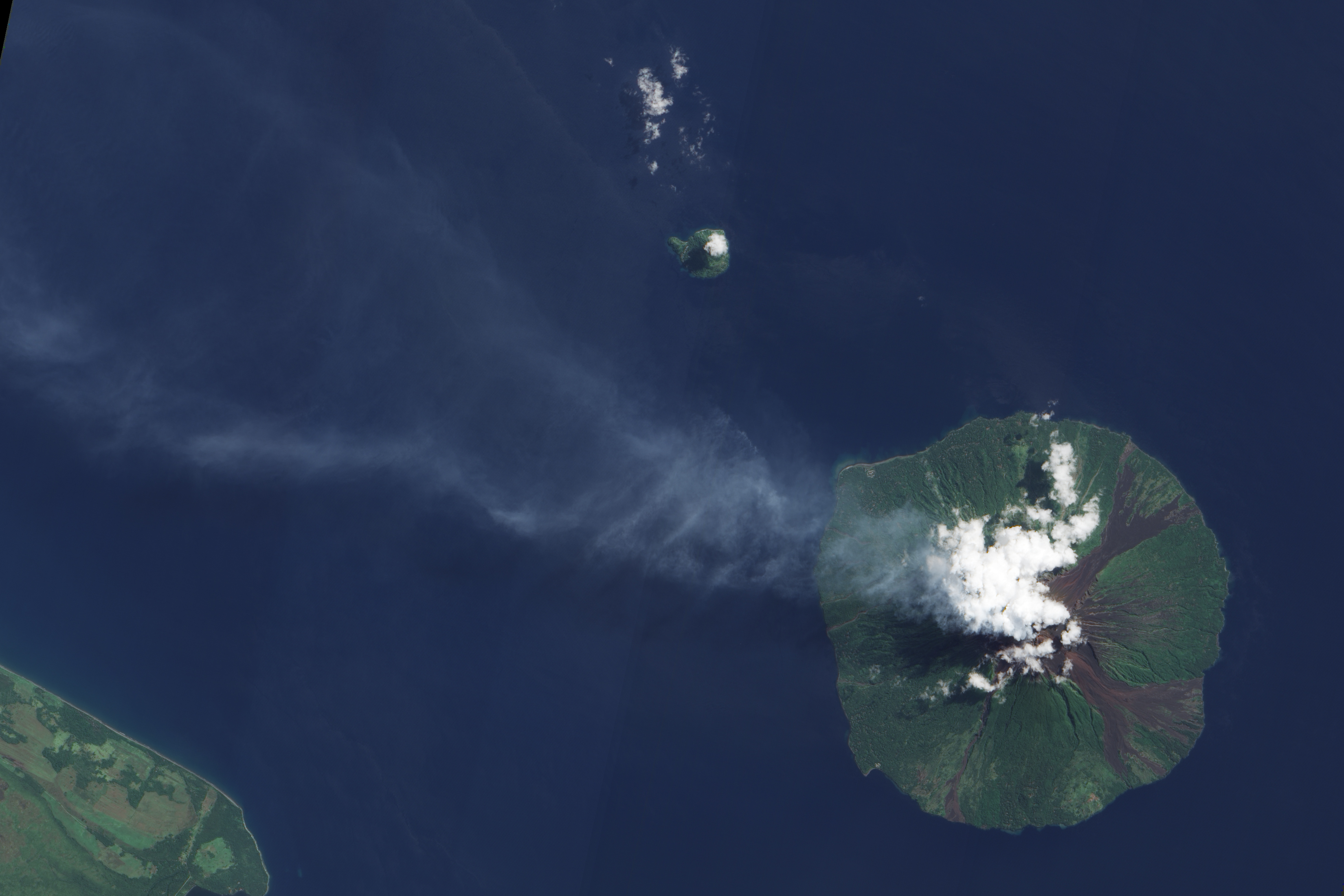
- Manam Volcano

Highest point
- Elevation: 1,807 m (5,928 ft)
- Prominence: 1,807 m (5,928 ft)
- Listing: Ultra
- Coordinates: 4°04′39″S 145°02′21″E

Geography
- Location within Papua New Guinea
- Location: Northeast of New Guinea, Papua New Guinea

Geology
- Mountain type: Stratovolcano
- Last eruption: 2010 to 2024 (ongoing)

Manam, known locally as Manam Motu, is an island located in the Bismarck Sea across the Stephan Strait from Yawar on the northeast coast of mainland Papua New Guinea's Bogia District. The island is 10 kilometers (6.2 mi) wide, and was created by the activity of the Manam Volcano, one of the country’s most active. The island was evacuated in 2004 and its residents resettled elsewhere in Papua New Guinea, but many have begun to return despite concerns of future volcanic activity. Manam is still erupting as of January 2024.

== Geology ==
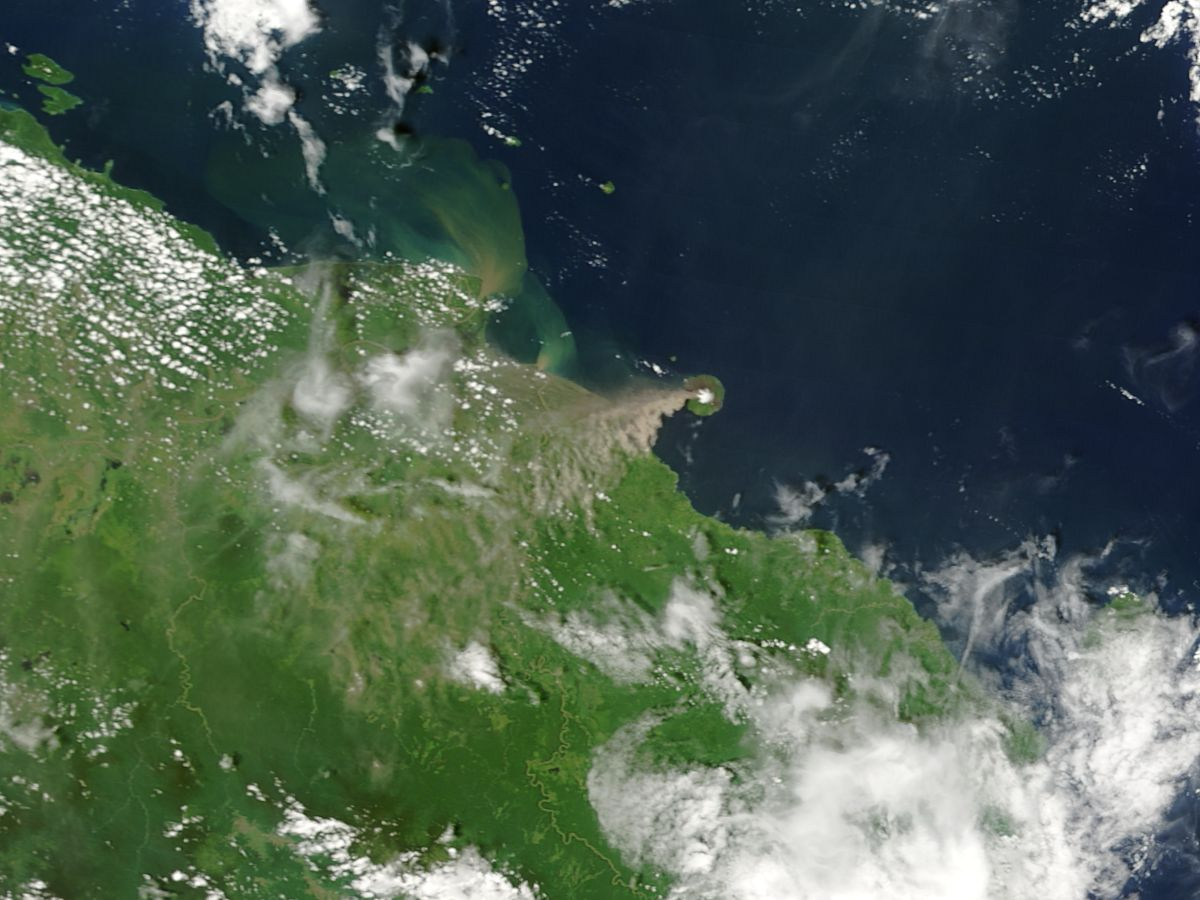
Large ash plume From Manam Volcano, November 2004

Manam is a basaltic-andesitic stratovolcano, and despite remarkably symmetrical lower flanks has four distinct valleys, locally known as "avalanche valleys" due to their ability to focus avalanches and particularly pyroclastic flows generated at the summit. These valleys represent the highest-risk areas during eruptions, and, when the island was inhabited, were typically the first areas to be evacuated during heightened activity. The earliest documented eruption of Manam was in 1616.

== History ==
The first recorded sighting by Europeans of Manam Island was on 5 August 1545 by the Spanish navigator Iñigo Órtiz de Retes on board the carrack San Juan, trying to return from Tidore to New Spain.

== Eruptions and hazards ==
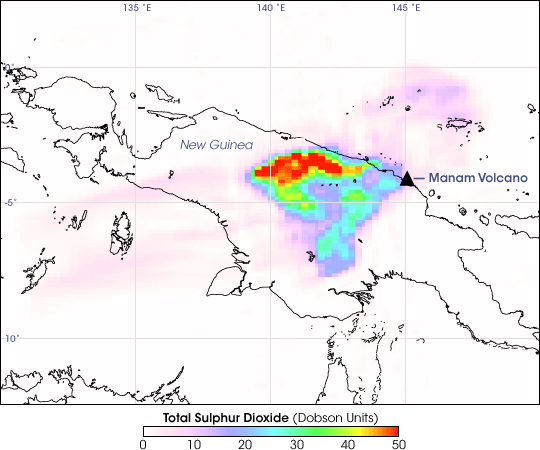
Sulfur dioxide cloud released by the January 27, 2005 eruption of Manam, as measured by the OMI aboard NASA's Aura satellite.

Thirteen local residents were killed during an eruption on 3 December 1996, when pyroclastic flows reached the village of Budua.

In November 2004, a major eruption forced the emergency evacuation of over 9,000 inhabitants of the island. The eruption began October 24 but was not seen as a major threat until the wind changed pushing ash and debris towards inhabited areas. Five people died during the eruption. On December 11, the threat was downgraded due to a reduction in activity. There have been significant problems at Bogia on the mainland where the evacuees resettled in camps at Mangem, Asarumba and Potsdam.

In March 2007 the government of Papua New Guinea made a large area of land available for permanent resettlement of displaced islanders at Andarum near Bogia. Also in March 2007, three people were killed by mudslides on the northern part of the island. As of 2014, at least 2000-3000 people have returned to the island despite continued government concerns for their safety.

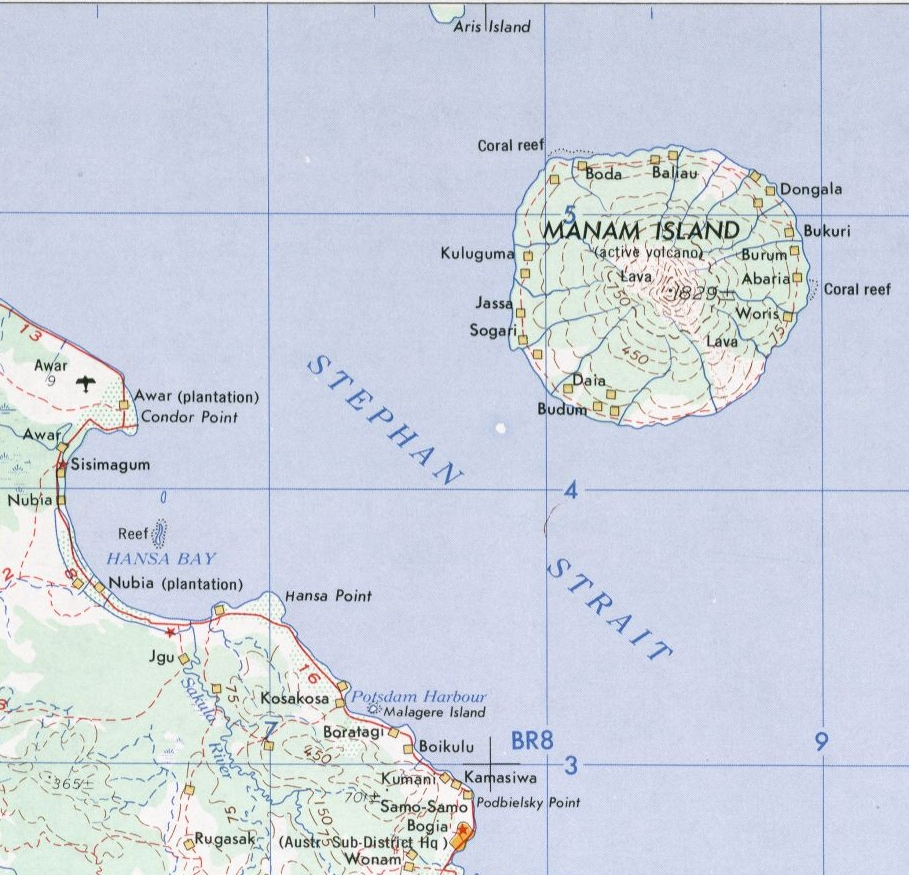
Map of Manama and adjacent coast

On March 8, 2022, the volcano erupted, sending a column of ash 15 km (9 mi) into the atmosphere. The eruption was confirmed by the Volcanic Ash Advisory Center in Darwin, Australia.

== Residents ==
Manam Islanders have their own language called Manam Pile (literally "Manam talk"), which is spoken on Manam and the nearby Boisa Islands. Manam islanders have a reputation in Papua New Guinea for musicianship and have produced several locally renowned musicians.

== See also ==
- List of volcanoes in Papua New Guinea
- List of Ultras of Oceania
