= Qila Tara Singh =

Coordinates: 30°41′0″N 73°37′0″E

- Town and union council
- Interactive map of Qila Tara Singh
- Country: Pakistan
- Province: Punjab
- District: Okara District
- Time zone: UTC+5 (PST)

Qila Tara Singh is a town and union council of Depalpur Tehsil in Okara District of Punjab province, Pakistan. It is located near Diaram, another town near Depalpur.
