= Burj Jeway Khan =

Coordinates: 30°52′12″N 73°16′43″E

- Town and union council
- Interactive map of Burj Jeway Khan
- Country: Pakistan
- Province: Punjab
- District: Okara District
- Time zone: UTC+5 (PST)

Burj Jeway Khan or Burj Jiwey Khan is a town and union council of Okara District in the Punjab province of Pakistan.
