= Chak 48/3R =

Coordinates: 29°38′08″N 73°07′36″E

Chak 48/3R is a planned village in southwest Okara District, of Punjab province, Pakistan. It has two localities: 48/3R and Niami. The hamlet has modern amenities, including wide streets and a sewer system.

== Religion ==
The majority religion is Islam; The village has three mosques, one of which, Jamia Masjid Bilal, is in its main square. A madrassah, Jamia Siddiqia, is affiliated with this mosque.

== Education ==
- Government High School 48/3R Okara, which was founded in 1927.
- Government Girls Elementary School 48/3R.
- New Radiant School, a private school.
- Jamia Siddiqia( founded by Syed Mohammad Siddique Shah) a religious school.

== Lifestyle ==
Rural agriculture is the main source of income of the people. Punjabi is the main language of the village, with Urdu and English in wide use. People eat desi food, while fast food is also trending among the masses. A water filtration plant provides pure drinking water. "Kurta Shalwar" is the main style of dress, while young people wear jeans and shirts. "Dhoti Kurta" is also popular with the villagers.
