= Balloki Headworks =

Barrage on the Ravi River in Punjab, Pakistan

Head Balloki Barrage
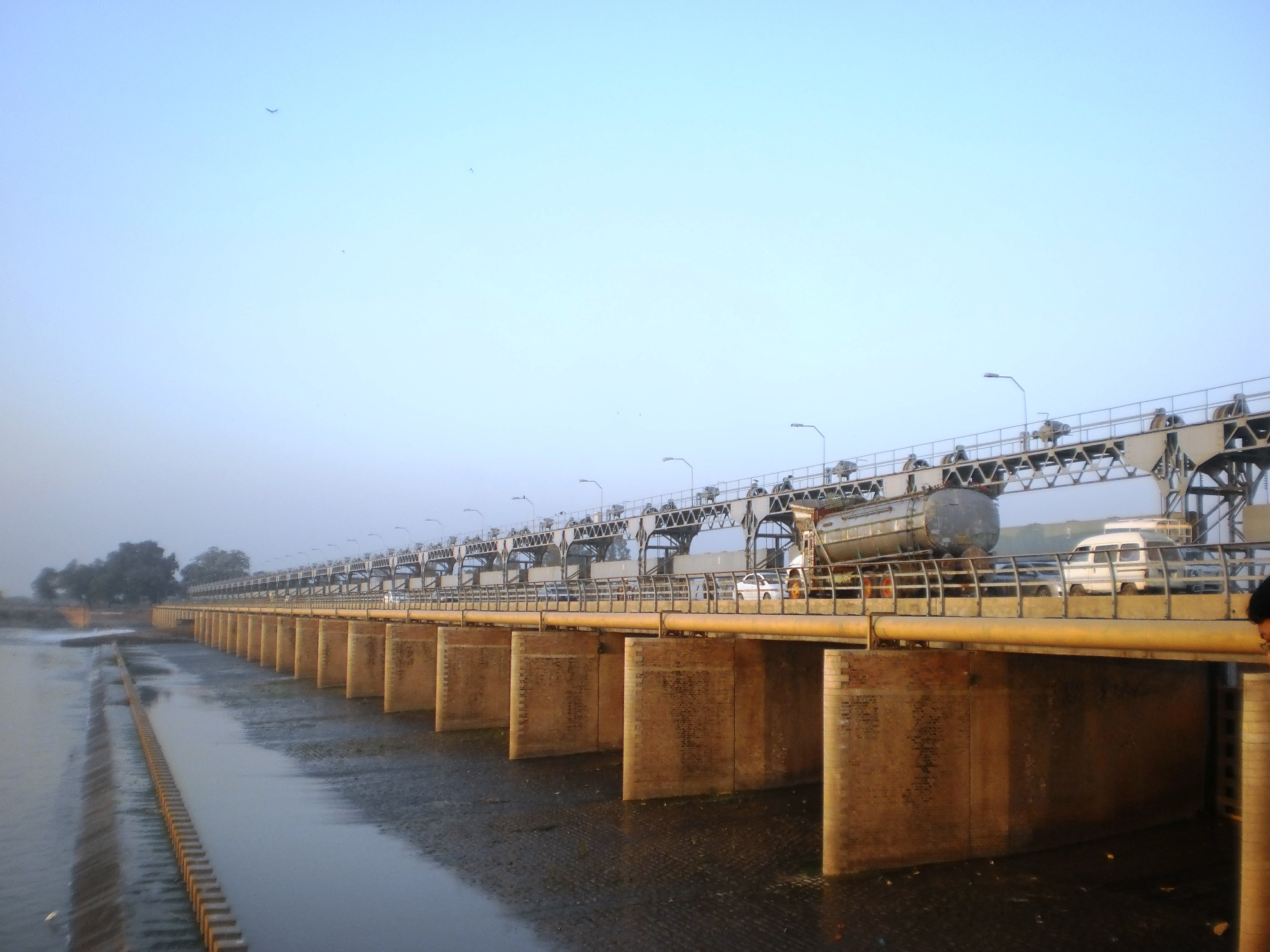
- Head Balloki barrage across the Ravi River
- Interactive map of Head Balloki Barrage
- Country: Pakistan
- Location: Balloki, Kasur District, Punjab
- Coordinates: 31.2222°N 73.8591°E
- Purpose: Irrigation
- Status: Operational
- Construction began: 1911
- Opening date: 1915
- Built by: British Raj
- Owner: Punjab Irrigation Department
- Operator: Punjab Irrigation Department

Dam and spillways
- Type of dam: Barrage
- Impounds: Ravi River
- Length: 1,647 ft (502 m)
- Spillway type: 35 steel radial gates each 12 m wide
- Headworks for the Lower Bari Doab Canal

Balloki Headworks, commonly known as Head Balloki, is a barrage on the Ravi River in the Punjab province of Pakistan. It is 70 km from Lahore. It was built around 1915 under the British India as part of the 'Triple Canals Project' to feed the Lower Bari Doab Canal. The canal turned a profit of 24% within ten years (in 1928–29). The original weir has now been rebuilt as a full barrage.

== History ==
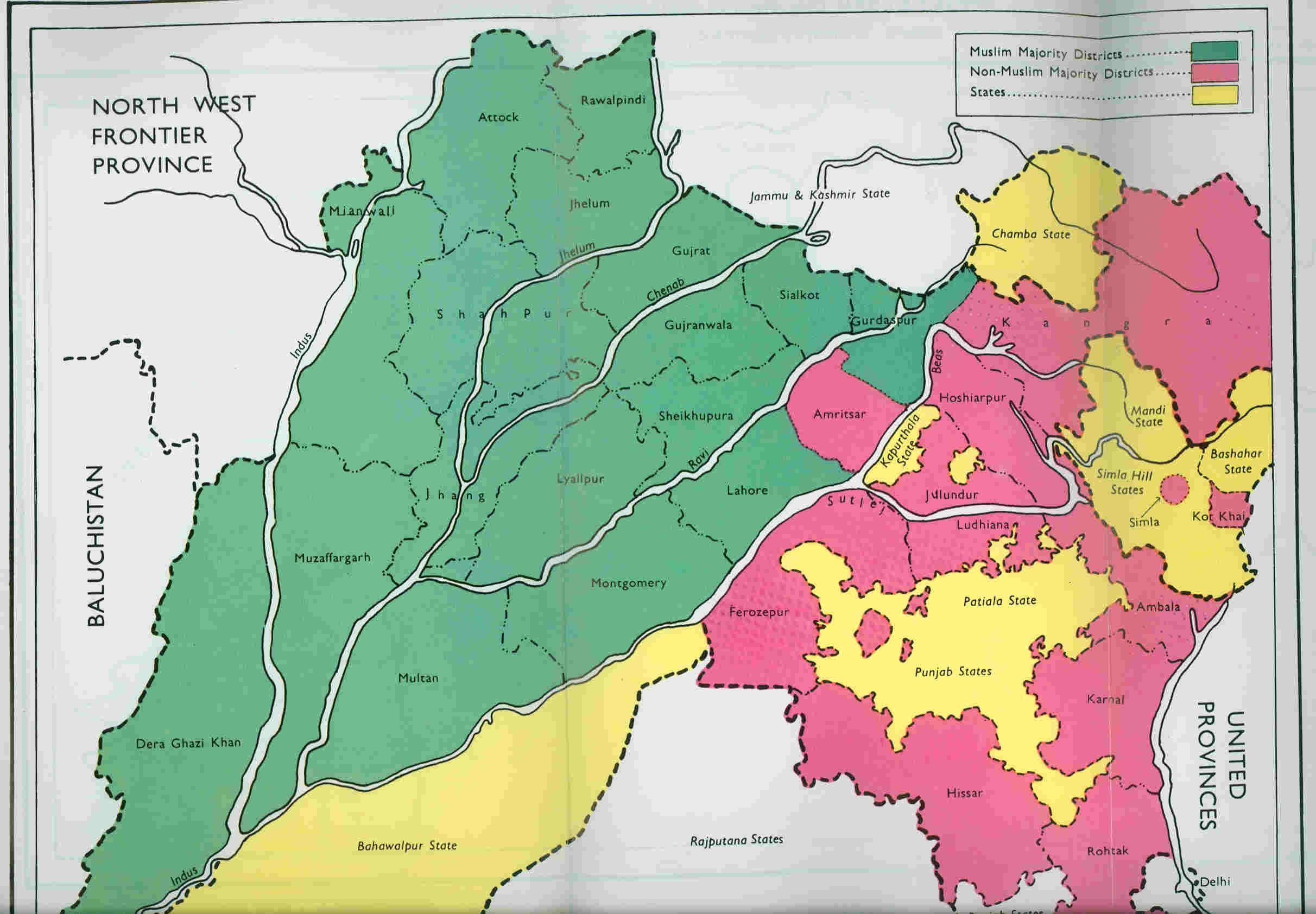
The districts of Punjab prior to partition of India

=== Ancient, Mughal and Sikh Eras ===
The region around Balloki was part of the Indus Valley Civilization, with archaeological sites nearby. Village Balloki was founded by the Sandhu Jutt tribe, who were loyalists of the Mughal Empire. The village became a key center for agriculture, trade, and commerce in the 16th-18th centuries. During the Sikh rule (18th-19th centuries), village Balloki remained an important agricultural hub and was known for its cotton and wheat production.

=== British Era ===
The British built canals and irrigation systems, boosting Balloki's agricultural significance in the 19th-20th centuries. The Triple Canals project in Punjab began in 1905, soon after the completion of the Upper Bari Doab Canal (UBDC). It was the second irrigation project to be implemented in Punjab.

It constructed three canals:

- the Upper Jhelum Canal (UJC) from Mangla
- the Upper Chenab Canal (UCC) from Marala
- the Lower Bari Doab Canal (LBDC) from Balloki.

The Upper Chenab and Lower Bari were linked at Balloki. The former brought water from the Chenab River to the Ravi River, and recharged it after depletion into the Upper Bari Canal. The Lower Bari Doab Canal then took the combined waters from the Ravi River and UCC down the Bari doab for irrigating lands.

This marked the inception of the "link canal" concept, a notion aimed at transferring water from the western rivers to the eastern rivers of Punjab. It was this concept that eventually laid the groundwork for the Indus Waters Treaty between contemporary India and Pakistan.

The Balloki Barrage was constructed to the west of Balloki village, where the Upper Chenab river met the Ravi river. It was the largest barrage of its kind in India at that era. It had a 1,647-foot-long weir with thirty-five 12-metre-wide steel gates for regulating the water of Ravi. The Lower Bari Doab Canal branched off on the left of the barrage. This canal commenced water supply operations in 1912 and achieved full completion in 1917. It irrigated 877,000 acres of land in the Montgomery and Multan districts. The total cost of the LBDC project was Rs. 22 million. It became profitable within 10 years.

== See also ==
- List of dams and reservoirs in Pakistan

== Bibliography ==
- Chaturvedi, Mahesh Chandra (2011), India's Waters: Environment, Economy, and Development, CRC Press, ISBN 978-1-4398-7283-3
- Headrick, Daniel R. (1988), The Tentacles of Progress: Technology Transfer in the Age of Imperialism, 1850-1940, Oxford University Press, ISBN 978-0-19-802178-0
- Naqvi, Saiyid Ali (2012), Indus Waters and Social Change: The Evolution and Transition of Agrarian Society in Pakistan, Oxford University Press Pakistan, ISBN 978-0-19-906396-3
