= Rao Sikandar Iqbal =

Pakistani politician

Rao Sikandar Iqbal راؤ سِكندر اِقبال

3rd Deputy Prime Minister of Pakistan
- In office 23 November 2002 – 15 November 2007
- President: Pervez Musharraf
- Prime Minister: Zafarullah Khan Jamali; Chaudhry Shujaat Hussain; Shaukat Aziz
- Preceded by: Nusrat Bhutto
- Succeeded by: Nisar Ali Khan
- Constituency: NA-144 (Okara-II)

23rd Defence Minister of Pakistan
- In office 23 November 2002 – 15 November 2007
- President: Pervez Musharraf
- Prime Minister: Zafarullah Khan Jamali; Chaudhry Shujaat Hussain; Shaukat Aziz
- Preceded by: Pervez Musharraf
- Succeeded by: Ahmad Mukhtar

Personal details
- Born: 1943 Quetta, Balochistan, [Pakistan]
- Died: 29 September 2010 (aged 67) C.M.H Okara Cantt., Okara District, Punjab, Pakistan
- Party: Pakistan Peoples Party; PPP (Patriots)
- Spouse: Shafiqa Rao Sikandar
- Relations: Rao family
- Children: 4
- Education: Forman Christian College, Lahore; PULC, University of Punjab
- Occupation: Lawyer, Politician.
- Religion: Islam
- Origin: Okara, Pakistan

Rao Sikandar Iqbal (Urdu: راؤ سِكندر اِقبال) (c. 1943 – 29 September 2010) was the Senior Minister and Defence Minister of Pakistan from 2002 to 2007.

== Biography ==
Born in 1943, Iqbal took his primary education in Quetta, after which he joined the Forman Christian College in Lahore. He held an LL.B. from Punjab University Law College, and he was the secretary general of the students' union of the university.

In 1969, Iqbal joined the provincial revenue department as a tehsildar. In 1975, after meeting with president Zulfikar Ali Bhutto, he resigned and joined the Pakistan Peoples Party (PPP).

In 1988 Iqbal was elected to the National Assembly of Pakistan, and served as Minister of Food, Agriculture and Cooperatives under Benazir Bhutto, on her first term. He lost the elections in 1990, but was re-elected again in 1993 and served as Minister of Sports, Culture and Tourism, on Bhutto's second term, that ended in 1996. He also served as chairman of the National Assembly's Standing Committee on Defence.

Between 1997 and 2001 he was the President of PPP. Punjab.

In 2002 Iqbal was elected to the National Assembly again and joined the group PPP-Patriots. He was inducted to the Federal Cabinet and served as Defence Minister during this time, he was also honoured as Deputy Prime Minister between 2002 and 2007 under Prime Ministers Mir Zafarullah Khan Jamali, Chaudhry Shujaat Hussain and Shaukat Aziz.

== Personal life ==
Iqbal was married and had four children, a daughter, three sons.

Iqbal died after prolonged illness in Okara, on 29 September 2010, at the age of 68. He had been suffering from diabetes. Later, he suffered renal failure and needed dialysis.

== Honours ==
- Spain: Grand Cross (White Decoration) of the Cross of Military Merit (20 April 2007)

== Legacy ==
Okara is known as the "City of Ministers", and is called a "Milk Lake of Pakistan". Okara is often called "Mini Lahore" by tourists.

During the period of British rule there was a jungle of Okaan where the city was built, and from this the name of the city was derived.

During Rao Sikandar's tenure the following were built in Okara:

- Rao Sikandar Iqbal Road
- Benazir Road
- Okara Bypass
- Cadet College, Okara
- Kulsoom Hospital, Okara (currently working as Social Security Hospital)
- University of Education, Okara (now moved to Renala Khurd)
