= Chak 4GD =

Village

Chak No. 4/G.D. Ghulam Rasool Wala چک نمبر 4 جی ڈی
- Union Council 53
- Location within Pakistan
- Coordinates: 30°58′32.12″N 73°35′13.38″E
- Country: Pakistan
- Province: Punjab
- District: Okara
- Tehsil: Renala Khurd
- Union Council: UC-53

Government
  - Chairman: Chairman Ushr and Zakat Committee = On hold

Population (2010 estimate)
  - Total: 20,000
- Time zone: UTC+5 (PST)

Chak No. 4/G.D. (Punjabi, Urdu: چک نمبر 4 جی ڈی) is a village in Okara District near Renala Khurd in Punjab, Pakistan. It is located in a fertile area just under 13 kilometers (7.5 miles) north of the city across the Lower Bari Doab Canal. It is the main village on Chuchak Road and is also a union council center.

The population here depends on agriculture, although many people work in other fields such as defense, teaching, and engineering. It has a co-ed high school, a branch of the National Bank of Pakistan (branch code 1577), an agricultural office, and a veterinary hospital.

== History ==
Before British colonization the village was known as Gulam Rasool Wala (Urdu: غلام رسول والا), after its Punjabi founder. Hafiz Ghulam Rasool, who was the forefather of the Jat Jura family living in the village. During the establishment of a British canal in this area, the region was divided based on the water availability with the name 4/G.D which actually refers to 4th Gugera Drain(4/G.D). Such a naming practice was common for the British to re-purpose and identify conquered villages.

== Religion ==
The primary religion of the village is Islam, with a large number of Ahl al-Hadith and also Sunni. There are two mosques in the village, one of each denomination. Peace, harmony and good social relations exist between the religious factions of the town. Due to its proximity to the Indian Border, the town also bears influences of Hinduism and Sikhism which existed in this region before the India-Pakistan Partition in 1947.

== Economics ==
The fertile soil in the region surrounding the village of Chak 4/G.D has created an economy dependent on agriculture, as it is located near a Doab (a confluence of two or more rivers). However, availability of agricultural land is limited due to the tightly packed farms of neighboring villages, which has led local people to pursue other fields such as business and government jobs.

== Politics ==
The majority of residents belong to the Rajput Kamyana (Urdu: کمیانہ) clan. This group descends from the tribe of Hazrat Mian Kamman, a figure who is buried east of Islampur in Old Kamman within the ghoripal land possessed by Mian Asim Kamyana. There are some Lahi - Kharal (Urdu: لہی - کھرل), Bhatti (Urdu: بھٹی) and some also belong to Jat Jura (Urdu: جٹ جرا) families.

In the years 1980 to 2000, Haji Mian Bashir Ahmad Kamyana was one of the active political leaders. He had a lot of worth in 4/G.D and the villages surrounding it. His son Mian Shaheen Kamyana and also Chairman of 4gd union Council. was also the Public leader.

== Organizations ==
=== Welfare Societies ===
- Al-Muhammdia Students Federation (Youth Representative): Organizes debate competitions every year for developing confidence among local students, and welfare activities, arranges street lights, floodlight tournaments, and many more activities for youth to make them responsible and active persons.
- Itihad Welfare Society: Development of villagers.
- Islamic Welfare Society: Established after the death of Muhammad Yousaf Sajid by his sons. Under this society medical facilities were given to the people for free. More than 100 of the students were provided with Hifz-Ul-Quran facilities.

=== Educational Institutions ===
1. Islamic Public Girls High School: Established in 1998, Islamic Public Girls High School was initially supervised by Muhammad Yousaf Sajid (late). Currently, it is under the leadership of Ateeq-Ur-Rehman, son of Muhammad Yousaf Sajid, and Mrs. Ateeq. Originally a private institution, the school has been functioning under the Punjab Education Foundation (PEF) since 2013. Islamic Public Girls High School has successfully passed all the QAT's with an average score of 97%.
2. Ideal College for Boys & Girls: Operating since 2017, Ideal College for Boys & Girls has achieved a remarkable academic record. It is supported financially and morally by Engineer Muhammad Tayyab, son of Muhammad Ayoub.
3. Government High School for Boys & Nadeem Shaheed Government Girls Higher Secondary School: Both institutions are known for their excellent academic performance and have contributed significantly to the educational development of the area.
4. Jamia LilBanat: The Madarsa was reconstructed under the leadership of Molvi Basheer Ahmed and Iqbal Number Dar. They successfully managed the Madarsa for 20 years. Jamia LilBanat, a Madarsa dedicated to girls, has been serving the community for many years. With financial and moral support from Altaf Ur Rehman, son of Muhammad Yousaf Sajid, the institution has completed the construction of a new, modern building equipped with all necessary amenities.

=== Social Organizations ===
1. Rabitah Al Eman This self-help-based organization is supported by local residents who provide funds. The funds are used to offer ration, financial assistance, and other support to underprivileged families.

=== Sports Union 4.G.D ===
Overview:

Sports Union 4 GD, a village-based sports organization, was founded in July 2015. The organization primarily focuses on the sports-related issues of the village and aims to promote positive qualities in the younger generation by organizing various sports events.

Main Events:

The highlight of their annual calendar is the Jashn-e-Aazadi Sports Festival. The Sports Union also arranges regular events for the local youth.

Member Clubs:

- Nadeem Shaheed Cricket Club
- Young Lions Cricket Club
- Fata Cricket Club
- Ravians Cricket Club
- Colony Qalandar cricket Club

Additionally, the Football Club and Badminton Clubs are associate members. Mian Ateeq Sajid is the Chairman of this club.

Leadership:

Abdul Ghaffar has been serving as the president of Sports Union 4/G.D since 2019.

Jawad Force Football Club

Jawad Force Football Club (formerly known as Force Football Club) was renamed in honor of Rai Jawad, a former player who tragically lost his life in an accident. The club is one of the leading football teams associated with 4GD and enjoys a strong reputation throughout the area. The current President of the club is Mian Iftikhar. Over the years, Jawad Force Football Club has achieved remarkable success, winning numerous trophies in inter-village tournaments and earning recognition for its sporting excellence and community spirit.

=== Affiliated Club ===
- Nadeem Shaheed Cricket Club: This club, a member of Sports Union 4 GD, has won the 14 August League five times, showcasing exceptional cricketing talent.

== Sports ==
Sports are a big source of entertainment, especially among local youth. Cricket, volleyball, badminton and football are the most popular sports. The local boys' high school is used as the center of sporting activities because there are no dedicated facilities for sports events. Young students often organize sports with neighboring villages on their own initiative.

== See also ==
- Renala Khurd
