= Mustafabad, Kapurthala =

Mustafabad
- Village
- Location in Punjab, India Mustafabad (India)
- Coordinates: 30.735498°N 76.384709°E
- Country: India
- State: Punjab
- District: Kapurthala

Government
  - Type: Panchayati raj (India)
  - Body: Gram panchayat

Population (2011)
  - Total: 883
- Sex ratio 462/421♂/♀

Languages
  - Official: Punjabi
  - Other spoken: Hindi
- Time zone: UTC+5:30 (IST)
- PIN: 144802
- Telephone code: 01822
- ISO 3166 code: IN-PB
- Vehicle registration: PB-09
- Website: kapurthala.gov.in

Mustafabad is a village in Kapurthala district of Punjab State, India. It is located 11 kilometres (6.8 mi) from Kapurthala, which is both district and sub-district headquarters of Mustafabad. The village is administrated by a Sarpanch, who is an elected representative. Mustafabad was ruled by Randhawa Jats, the founder of this dynasty was Desu Singh of Taran Taran.

== Demography ==
According to the report published by Census India in 2011, Mustafabad has total number of 203 houses and population of 883 of which include 462 males and 421 females. Literacy rate of Mustafabad is 82.81%, higher than state average of 75.84%. The population of children under the age of 6 years is 92 which is 10.42% of total population of Mustafabad, and child sex ratio is approximately 1140, higher than state average of 846.

As per census 2011, 308 people were engaged in work activities out of the total population of Mustafabad which includes 267 males and 41 females. According to census survey report 2011, 93.83% workers describe their work as main work and 6.17% workers are involved in Marginal activity providing livelihood for less than 6 months.

== Population data ==
Particulars	Total	Male	Female
Total No. of Houses	203	-	-
Population	883	462	421
Child (0-6)	92	43	49
Schedule Caste	123	58	65
Schedule Tribe	0	0	0
Literacy	82.81 %	87.35 %	77.69 %
Total Workers	308	267	41
Main Worker	289	0	0
Marginal Worker	19	16	3

== Caste ==
Most of the peoples are jatts in this village. Bajwa is the top caste in this village. 12.3% are Ramgharia tarkhans like matharoos etc. The village has schedule caste (SC) constitutes 13.93% of total population of the village and it doesn't have any Schedule Tribe (ST) population.

== Air travel connectivity ==
The closest airport to the village is Sri Guru Ram Dass Jee International Airport.
