= Mostufaabad =

Mostufaabad مستوفي اباد
- Village
- Location within Iran
- Coordinates: 30°52′54″N 49°22′03″E
- Country: Iran
- Province: Khuzestan
- County: Ramshir
- Bakhsh: Central
- Rural District: Abdoliyeh-ye Gharbi

Population (2006)
  - Total: 21
- Time zone: UTC+3:30 (IRST)
  - Summer (DST): UTC+4:30 (IRDT)

Mostufaabad (Persian: مستوفي اباد, also Romanized as Mostūfáābād; also known as Makīneh-ye Ḩāj Karīm, Mostavfīābād, and Mostowfīābād) is a village in Abdoliyeh-ye Gharbi Rural District, in the Central District of Ramshir County, Khuzestan Province, Iran. At the 2006 census, its population was 21, in 4 families.
