= Mustafaabad, Bhakkar =

Village in Punjab, Pakistan

Mustafaabad is a small village in Bhakkar District of the Punjab province, Pakistan. It is 9 km east of Dullewala. The former name of the village was Jhammat Janubi. Its total population is about 5,000 people. Four main tribes have inhabited the town for over 200 years: Khayara, Naich, Jhammat, and Hajam. People are very conservative and mostly follow the Hanafi branch of Islam. The primary source of income is agriculture and the main agricultural crop is gram (chickpea). The mother language is Saraiki.
