= Yawar, Papua New Guinea =

Yawar
- Village
- Location in Papua New Guinea
- Coordinates: 4°14′S 144°56′E
- Country: Papua New Guinea
- Province: Madang Province
- District: Bogia District
- LLG: Yawar LLG

Yawar is a coastal village in Yawar Rural LLG, Bogia District, Madang Province, northern Papua New Guinea. It is the principal settlement of Yawar Rural LLG. The village lies on the Stephan Strait along the North Coast Highway. Offshore is Laing Island, a small island, and further to the north-east across the strait is the island of Manam. A church was documented in the village in the 1980s.
