= Bibi Pur =

Village

- Town and union council
- Location in Pakistan
- Coordinates: 30°54′41″N 73°28′20″E
- Country: Pakistan
- Province: Punjab
- District: Okara District
- Elevation: 159 m (522 ft)
- Time zone: UTC+5 (PST)

Bibi Pur is a town and union council of Okara District in the Punjab province of Pakistan.

It is located at 30°54'41N 73°28'20E, at an altitude of 159 metres (541 feet).
