= Okara Tehsil =

Okara Tehsil تحصیل اوکاڑہ
- Tehsil
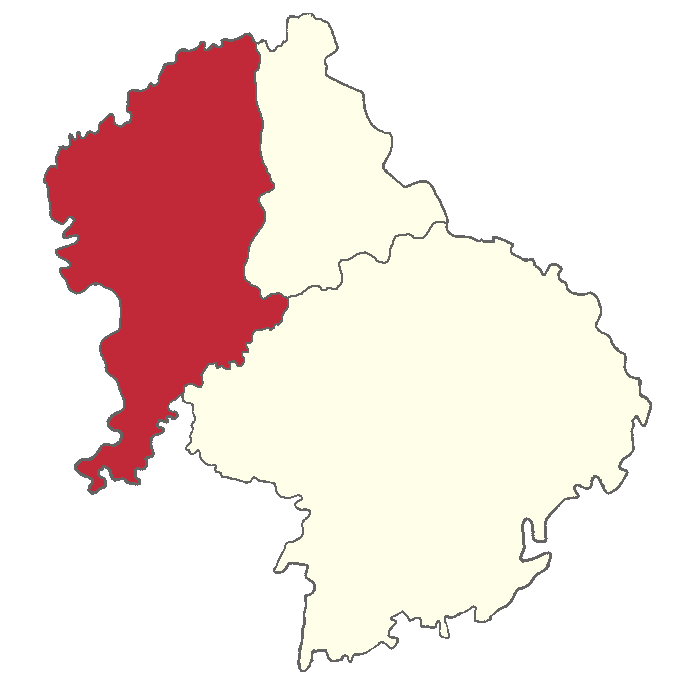
- Country: Pakistan
- Region: Punjab
- District: Okara District
- Capital: Okara
- Union councils: 41
- Time zone: PST

Okara is an administrative subdivision (or tehsil) of Okara District in the Punjab province of Pakistan. It is administratively subdivided into 41 union councils, 11 of which form the tehsil capital Okara.
