= Lower Bari Doab Canal =

Pakistani

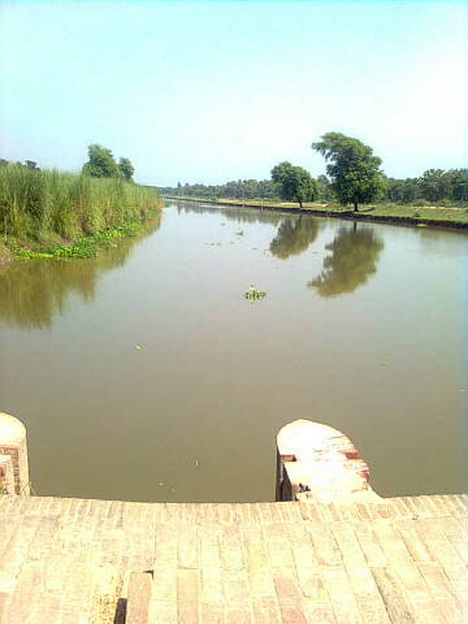
- Interactive map of Lower Bari Doab Canal
- Location: Punjab
- Country: Pakistan

Specifications
- Length: 201 km (125 miles)

The Lower Bari Doab Canal is a canal in Punjab, Pakistan. Part of the second-largest irrigation system of the province, it serves approximately 275,000 farmsteads. It is located south-west of Lahore and runs alongside the River Ravi.

== History ==
Lower Bari Doab Canal was commissioned in 1914, off-taking from Balloki Barrage, whereas the barrage itself was constructed in 1911–13. The canal was remodeled in 1985-88 and then again in 2014–18. The canal was formally inaugurated by Governor of the Punjab Sir William Malcolm Hailey on 12 April 1912. Subsidiary canal off-taking from the main canal were designed by Sir Ganga Ram to irrigate his 50,000 acres of land in Sahiwal District of the Punjab. Sir Ganga Ram incidentally also built a power station on the main canal near the town of Renala Khurd in 1925. The power station had five generators delivering a total of 1.1 mega watt electricity.

== Current status ==
The canal has been rehabilitated as part of a mega project funded by the Asian Development Fund and implemented by the Lower Bari Doab Canal Improvement Project of the Punjab Irrigation Department in 2014–18. The 201 km-long canal along with 2,264 km of distribution channels irrigates 700,000 hectares of land of Okara, Pakpattan, Sahiwal, and Khanewal districts. The remodeling project also enhanced the flood management of the Balloki Barrage from 2,25,000 cusecs to 2,60,000 cusecs.
