= Mian Yawar Zaman =

Pakistani politician

Member of the Provincial Assembly of the Punjab
- In office 15 August 2018 – 14 January 2023
- Constituency: PP-188 Okara-VI
- In office 1 June 2013 – 31 May 2018
- Constituency: PP-191 Okara-VII
- In office 9 April 2008 – 20 March 2013
- Constituency: PP-191 Okara-VII
- In office 25 November 2002 – 17 November 2007
- Constituency: PP-191 Okara-VII

Personal details
- Born: 21 March 1961 (age 65) Okara, Punjab, Pakistan
- Party: PMLN (2002-present)

Punjab Assembly Lahore

Mian Yawar Zaman is a Pakistani politician. He is a Member of the Punjab Assembly. He has continuously been winning the elections since 2002. He is the son of Mian Zaman who was also elected MNA in 1997.

== Early life and education ==
He was born on 21 March 1961 in a humble Arain family in Okara.

He received his early education from Sadiq Public School. He graduated in 1980 from Government College in Okara and has the degree of Bachelor of Arts.

== Political career ==
He was elected to the Provincial Assembly of the Punjab as a candidate of Pakistan Muslim League (N) (PML-N) from Constituency PP-191 (Okara-VII) in the 2002 Pakistani general election. He received 28,355 votes and defeated a candidate of Pakistan Muslim League (Q).

He was re-elected to the Provincial Assembly of the Punjab as a candidate of PML-N from Constituency PP-191 (Okara-VII) in the 2008 Pakistani general election. He received 16,975 votes and defeated an independent candidate.

He was re-elected to the Provincial Assembly of the Punjab as a candidate of PML-N from Constituency PP-191 (Okara-VII) in the 2013 Pakistani general election. In June 2013, he was inducted into the provincial Punjab cabinet of Chief Minister Shehbaz Sharif and was made Provincial Minister of Punjab for Irrigation where he served until November 2016. In a cabinet reshuffle in November 2016, he was made Provincial Minister of Punjab for forest, wildlife, and fisheries.

He was re-elected to Provincial Assembly of the Punjab as a candidate of PML-N from Constituency PP-188 (Okara-VI) in the 2018 Pakistani general election.

He was again re-elected to Provincial Assembly of Punjab as a candidate of PML-N from Constituency PP-190 (Okara-VI) in the 2024 Pakistani general election with a lead of 11,299 votes.
