= Renala Khurd =

Pakistani town

Renala Khurd رِينالہ خُورد
- City
- Location in Punjab, Pakistan Renala Khurd (Pakistan)
- Coordinates: 30°53′N 73°36′E
- Country: Pakistan
- Province: Punjab
- District: Okara District
- Tehsil: Renala Khurd Tehsil

Government
  - Type: Municipal Committee
  - Chairman: Vacant
  - Vice-Chairman: Vacant

Area
  - City: 7 km^{2} (2.7 sq mi)
- Elevation: 173 m (568 ft)

Population (2023 census)
  - City: 100,054
  - Rank: 127th in Pakistan
  - Density: 14,000/km^{2} (37,000/sq mi)
- Time zone: UTC+5 (PST)
- Number of towns: 1
- Number of Union councils: 2

Renala Khurd (Punjabi, Urdu: رِينالہ خُورد) is a city in the Okara District in Punjab, Pakistan. It serves as the administrative headquarters of Renala Khurd Tehsil and sits at an elevation of approximately 570 feet (170 m) above sea level. The city is located about 116 kilometres (72 mi) from Lahore, the provincial capital, and 18 kilometres (11 mi) from Okara, the district's capital. Positioned southwest of Lahore, it lies along the national highway (GT Road) and the main Karachi–Peshawar Railway Line.

The word Khurd is of Persian origin, meaning small, while Renala translates to "Mother of Forests". Renala Khurd is renowned for its lush gardens, forests, and fruit orchards.

== Nearby cities ==
- Okara
- Depalpur
- Pattoki
- Sahiwal
- Pakpattan
- Shergarh

== Nearby Village ==
- Kaluwal
- Mittha
- 4GD
- Kaman
- Bama Bala
- Chuchak

== Demographics ==
=== Population ===
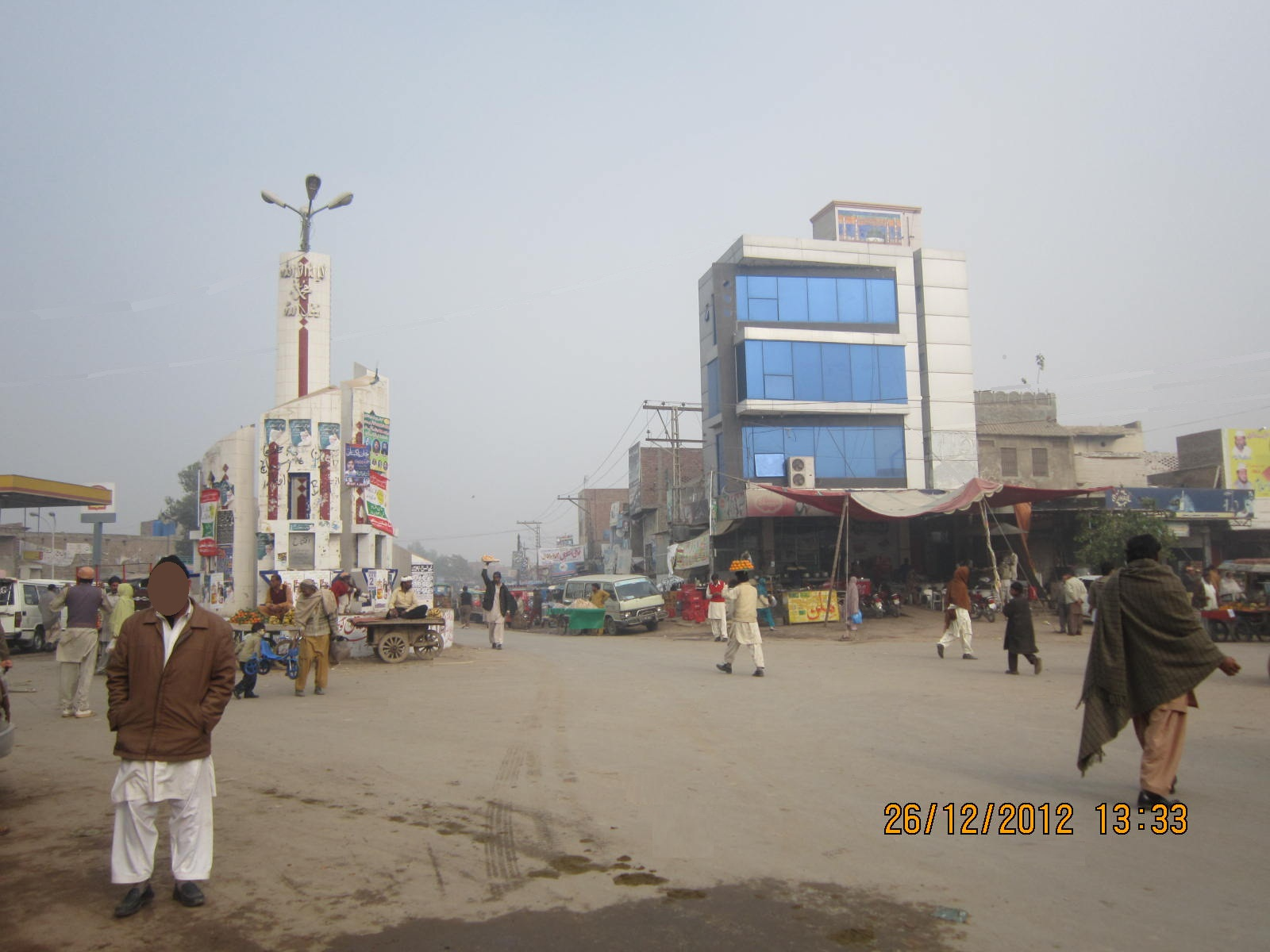
Kalma Chowk and the Milan Hotel

With a radius of 7 km, it is home to 100,054 inhabitants. The population of Renala Khurd is over 99% Muslim. It has a Sunni majority and a Shia minority; there are also small groups of Christians.

Due to its strategic location in the Indian sub-continent, many migrants have poured into the area and settled on its fertile lands. The people of Renala Khurd are descendants of Iranians, Turks, Afghans and Arabs who came individually or in groups.

Historical population

Year	Pop.	±%
1951	4,975	—
1961	7,867	+58.1%
1972	11,799	+50.0%
1981	18,287	+55.0%

Year	Pop.	±%
1998	32,337	+76.8%
2017	54,160	+67.5%
2023	100,054	+84.7%

Languages

Languages of Renala Khurd MC (2023 Census)
1. Punjabi (92.1%)
2. Urdu (7.50%)
3. Others (0.40%)

Punjabi, Urdu and Haryanavi are basic languages of the people.

== University of Okara ==
The University of Okara, previously known as the University of Education Okara campus, is 1 km west of the city. It was inaugurated in 2005 by then Prime Minister Shaukat Aziz.

== Notable residents ==
- Muhammad Sarwar (born 1975), Hockey Player
- Liaquat Ali (born 1983), Athlete
- Rizwan Haider (born 1985), Cricketer,
- Abdur Rauf (born 1978), Cricketer,

== See also ==
- Districts of Pakistan
  - Districts of Punjab, Pakistan
- Tehsils of Pakistan
  - Tehsils of Punjab, Pakistan
- Divisions of Pakistan
  - Divisions of Punjab, Pakistan
- List of cities in Pakistan by population
  - List of cities in Punjab, Pakistan by population
