= Okara District =

District in Punjab, Pakistan

Okara District ضلع اوكاڑہ
- District of Punjab
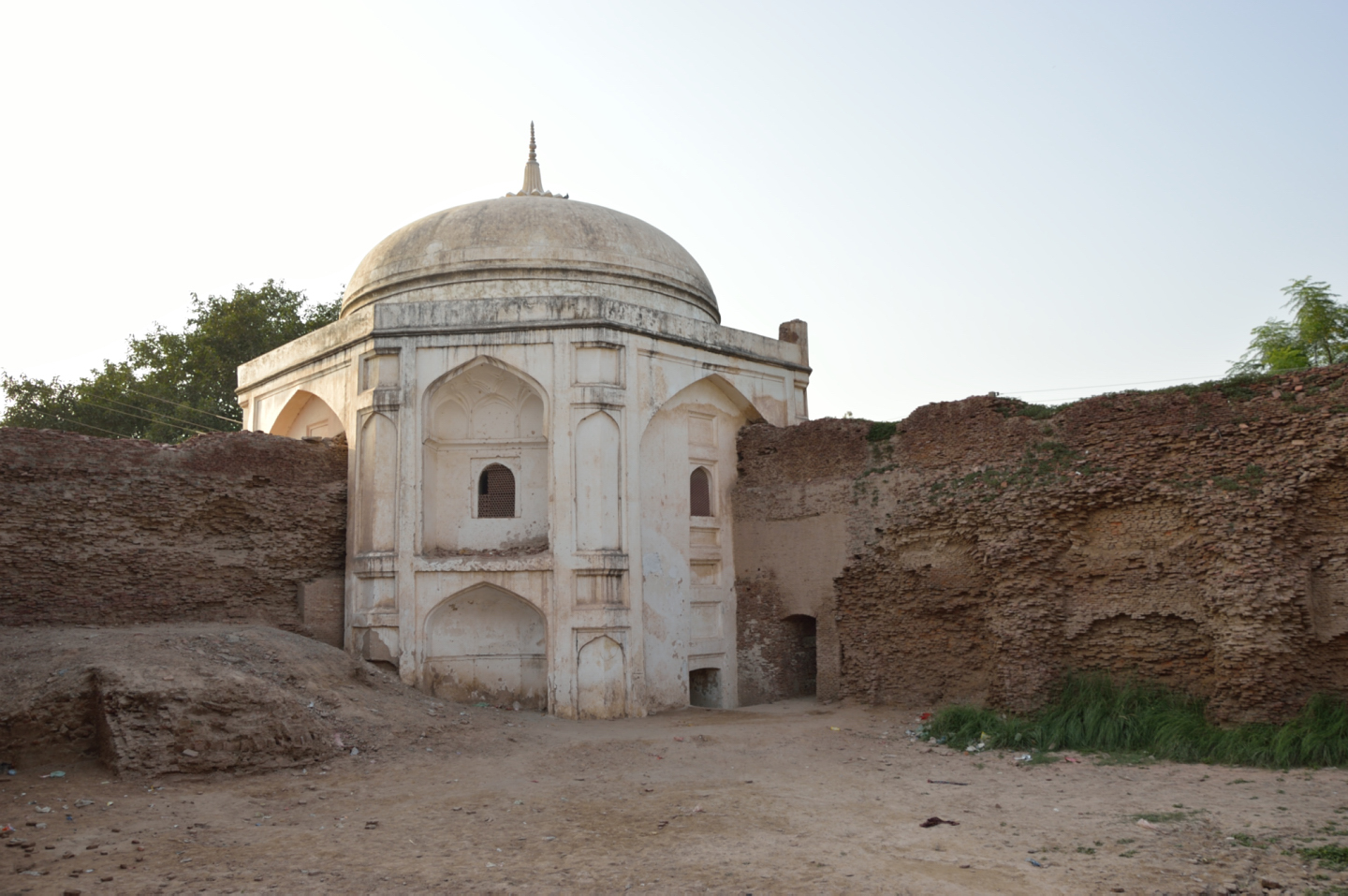
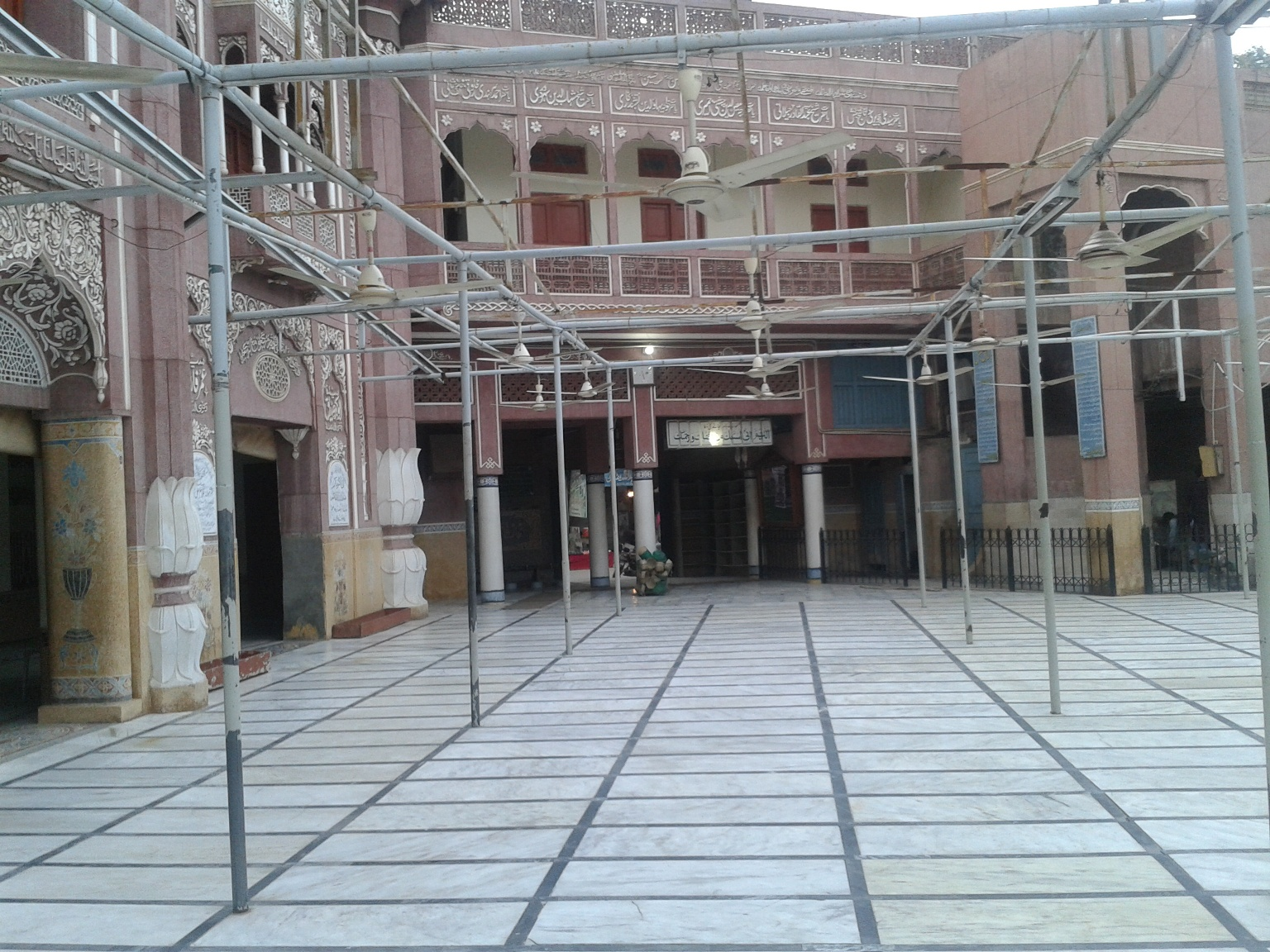
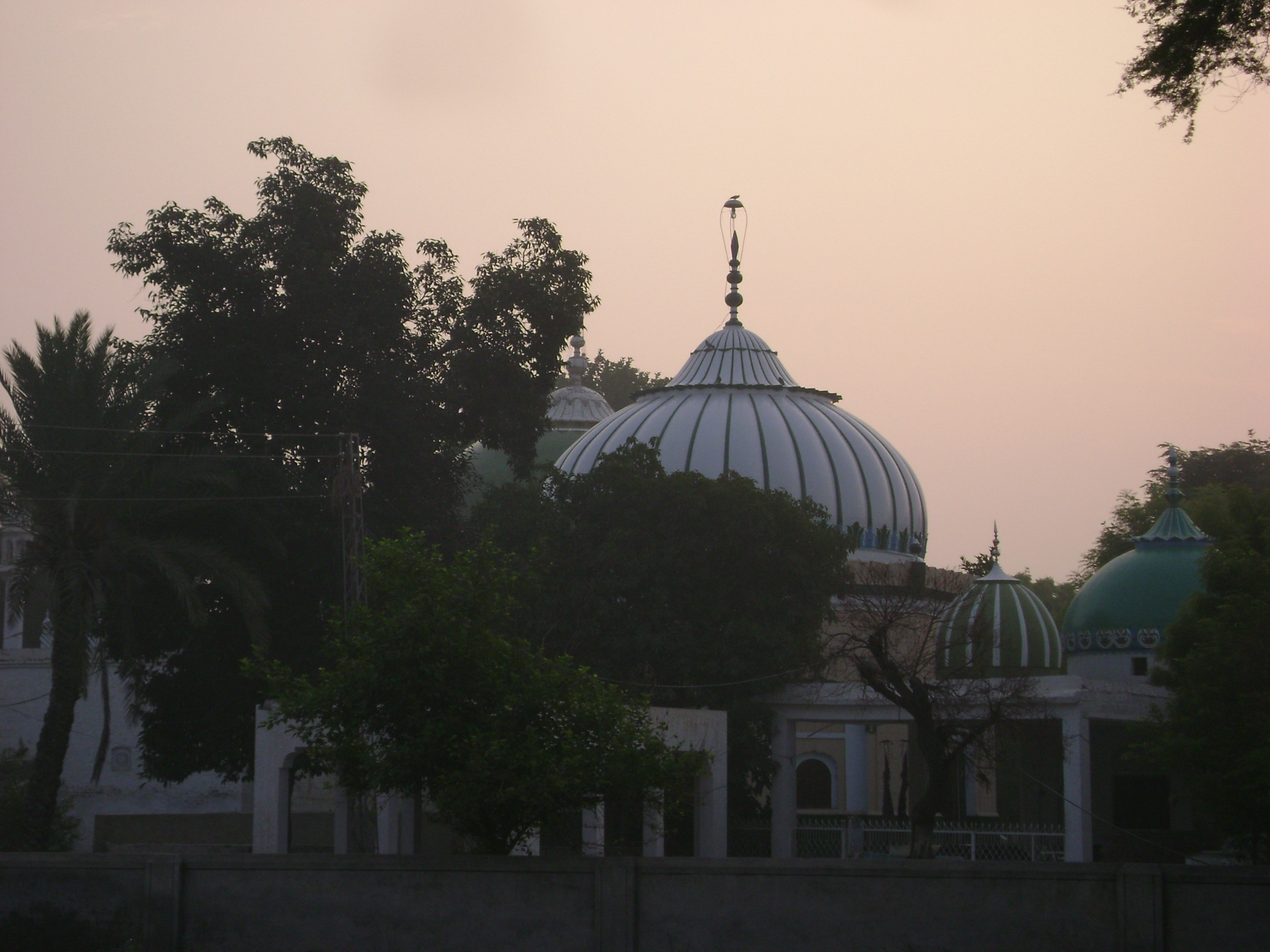
- Top: Satghara; Center: Ghausia Masjid, Okara; Bottom: Shaikhu Sharif, Okara

- Location of Okara in Punjab.
- Coordinates: 30.801380°N 73.448334°E
- Country: Pakistan
- Province: Punjab
- Division: Sahiwal
- Headquarters: Okara

Government
  - Type: District Administration
  - Deputy Commissioner: Zeeshan Hanif
  - District Police Officer: Mansoor Aman
  - District Health Officer: N/A

Area
  - District of Punjab: 4,377 km^{2} (1,690 sq mi)

Population (2023)
  - District of Punjab: 3,515,490
  - Density: 803.2/km^{2} (2,080/sq mi)
  - Urban: 1,187,504
  - Rural: 2,327,986

Literacy
  - Literacy rate: Total: (60.25%); Male: (66.52%); Female: (53.71%)
- Time zone: UTC+5 (PST)
- Area code: 044
- Tehsils: Depalpur; Okara; Renala Khurd
- Number of Union councils: 10
- Website: okara.punjab.gov.pk

Okara District (Punjabi and Urdu: ضلع اوكاڑہ) is a district of Punjab, Pakistan. It became a separate district in 1982, prior to that it was part of Sahiwal District.

== History ==
After the decline of the Mughal Empire, the Sikh Empire invaded and occupied Sahiwal. The Muslims faced restrictions during the Sikh rule. During the period of British rule, there was an Okan forest where the city has been built. The city is a relatively new agricultural city. The settlement's name "Okara" actually originated from word "Okan" (a lush green tree with needle-like leaves). The Okan Tree gave birth to the word Okanwali (Land of Okan) which ultimately became Okara. During British rule, the area was part of Montgomery District and contained a large saltpeter refinery. At independence in 1947, one of the two textile mills that Pakistan got was in Okara. The mill was known as Sutlej textile mill and it was Asia's biggest textile mill at the time but at present, it has closed down. In 1982, the city became the headquarters of the newly created Okara District. Okara has had a railway line since 1892.

In 2015, a jail was established in Okara which is named as Okara District Jail. The 52-acre prison has the capacity to hold 750 prisoners.

== Agriculture & Irrigation ==
Okara, Pakpattan, Sahiwal, Khanewal, Vehari and Multan combined produce more than 60% of the potatoe harvest of Pakistan. The whole area was barren land till the introduction of canal system. However, Lower Bari Doab Canal (LBDC) from river Ravi in 1913, and later Depalpur and Pakpattan canals, brought the entire district under the command of irrigation system.

== Demographics ==
Historical population
Year	Pop.	±% p.a.
1951	730,472	—
1961	827,528	+1.26%
1972	1,123,812	+2.82%
1981	1,487,261	+3.16%
1998	2,232,992	+2.42%
2017	3,040,826	+1.64%
2023	3,515,490	+2.45%

Religion in Okara district (2023)
Religion	Percent
Islam	98.38%
Christianity	1.59%
Other or not stated	0.03%

As of the 2023 census, Okara district has 549,724 households and a population of 3,515,490. The district has a sex ratio of 103.73 males to 100 females and a literacy rate of 60.25%: 66.52% for males and 53.71% for females. 958,545 (27.36% of the surveyed population) are under 10 years of age. 1,187,504 (33.78%) live in urban areas.

Religion in contemporary Okara District
Religious group	1941		2017		2023	
Religious group	Pop.	%	Pop.	%	Pop.	%
Islam	414,437	73.02%	2,995,995	98.53%	3,446,579	98.38%
Hinduism (Note: 1941 census: Including Ad-Dharmis)	78,751	13.87%	214	0%	214	0%
Sikhism	65,749	11.58%	—N/a	—N/a	44	0%
Christianity	8,602	1.52%	43,636	1.44%	55,735	1.59%
Ahmadi	—N/a	—N/a	956	0.03%	594	0.02%
Others (Note: Including Jainism, Buddhism, Zoroastrianism, Judaism, or not stated)	60	0.01%	25	0%	285	0.01%
Total Population	567,599	100%	3,040,826	100%	3,503,451	100%
Note: 1941 census data is for Okara and Depalpur tehsils of the former Montgomery District, which roughly corresponds to contemporary Okara district. District and tehsil borders have changed since 1941.

Languages of Okara district (2023)
1. Punjabi (94.2%)
2. Urdu (4.64%)
3. Others (1.20%)

At the time of the 2023 census, 94.16% of the population spoke Punjabi and 4.64% Urdu as their first language. The main Punjabi dialects of the district are Jhangvi (or Rachnavi), and the standard Majhi dialect.

There are many tribes and clans settled in the Okara District. The majority of the population of Okara are Punjabi speaking Muslims. The main tribes and clans include: Syed, Malik, Jhujh, Channar, Wattus, Mungun, Jhakhar, Klaason, Dhall Jutt, Rajputs, Shaikhs, Lodhis, Kharals, Kamyanas, Kumbohs, Khanzadas, Noons, Arains, Chaudhary and Baloch are prominent. However, the Jat population is less compared to other communities.

According to the 2023 census conducted by Pakistan Bureau of Statistics, 98.47 % population of Okara district is Muslim.

== Livestock ==
Okara is also known for its cattle breed known as Sahiwal and a Water buffalo breed known as Niliravi. It is very rich in livestock population and production. The Livestock Production Research Institute (LPRI) Bahadar Nagar Farm is a very large Government farm near Okara city (18.5 km on Faisalabad road from DepalPur Chowk Okara). The farm has a large number of cows, buffalos, bulls (for reproduction), goats and sheep. Okara is a major milk producing city of Pakistan. There is also a large military dairy farm in Okara district originally set up in 1913. After the independence of Pakistan in 1947, the 'battai system' (sharing-partners in crop yields) continued in all military-owned farms in Pakistan, with the farmers taking their respective shares in the crop yields.

== Bypass ==
Since 2005 the Okara Bypass (30.786887° 73.459238°), with a length of 12.7 km, on GT road (N-5) was opened.

== Surroundings ==
Towns in the district include:

- Depalpur
- Renala Khurd
- Basirpur
- Haveli Lakha
- Hujra Shaah Moqeem
- Ghaziabad
- Jaboka
- Chak 14 Gd Tehsildar
- Naul Plot
- Satghara

== Administration division ==
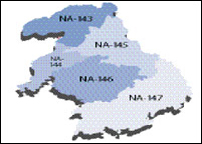
Map of the district's constituent units (national assembly)

The following is a table of the Tehsils & Union Councils of Okara District:

Tehsil	Area (km²)	Pop. (2023)	Density (ppl/km²) (2023)	Literacy rate (2023)	Union Councils
Depalpur	2,502	1,592,201	636.37	55.29%	55
Okara	1,241	1,393,746	1,123.08	63.34%	41
Renala Khurd	634	529,543	835.24	66.98%	18

Tehsil	Unions	Total Unions
Depalpur	1/SP WESAWEWALA, AMLI MOTI, AWAN KALAN, BARICT (CHAK BAWA), BASIRPUR-1, BASIRPUR-2, BEHLOL PUR, BHELA GULAB SINGH, BHOMAN SHAH, BHONE MANZaBTA, BHUTA MOHABBAT, BONGA SALEH, CHIPLI PUR, DEPALPUR-1, DEPALPUR-2, DEPALPUR-3, DHULLIANA, FARID PUR SOHAG, GUDDAR MULKANA, HAVELI LAKHA-1, HAVELI LAKHA-2, HAVELI LAKHA-3, HUJRA SHAH MUQEEM-1, HUJRA SHAH MUQEEM-2, HUJRA SHAH MUQEEM-3, JAITH PUR, JHUJH KALAN, KANI PUR, KLAIR KALAN, MAHANT DARSHAN, MANCHARIAN, MANDI AHMADABAD, MAROOF, MAZHAR ABAD, MEHAR SHAH KHAGA, MOHIB ALI UTAR, MUHAMMAD NAGAR, MUSTAFABAD., NAHAL MAHAR, NAMA JINDEKA, PANDAT MANFOOL PUR, PHULLAN TOLI, PIPLI PAHAR, QADIR ABAD, QILA JAVAND SINGH, QILA TARA SINGH, RAJOWAL, RATTA KHANNA, REHMAT WALA, ROHILA TAJEYKA, RUKAN PURA, SHAH NAWAZ KHAN, SHAH YAKKA, SHERGARH, SOBHA RAM	55
Okara	Thatta Ghulamka CHAK NO 25/2R SANGO-KA (CH BASHIR AHMAD SANGO-KA PAK ARMY), AKBAR, BIBI PUR, BURJ JEWAY KHAN, CHAK 2/4L, CHAK 12/GD, CHAK 14/GD, CHAK 15/1R, CHAK 16/GD, CHAK 17/GD, CHAK 18/GD, CHAK 24/GD, CHAK 27/4L, CHAK 32/2L, CHAK 32/2R, CHAK 38/2R, CHAK 34/GD, CHAK 36-A/4L, CHAK 4/4L, CHAK 40/3R, CHAK 40-A/4L, CHAK 42/3R (Salamatpur), CHAK 44/2L, CHAK 43/GD, CHAK 45/GD(RETRI), CHAK 48/3R, CHAK 52/2R, CHAK 53/2L, FATEH PUR, GOGERA-1, JABOKA, JANDRAKA, KOHLA, LASHARI, OKARA-1, E-BLOCK, Masibat Pura, OKARA-10, OKARA-11, OKARA-2, OKARA-3, OKARA-4, OKARA-5, OKARA-6, OKARA-7, OKARA-8, OKARA-9, SATGHARA, SHEIKHU SHARIF, TARIQ ABAD	41, 19/1R REHANO WALA.
Renala Khurd	Chak 13/1.R,( Imtiaz Ahmad Bhatti PA Vice Principal Academic, Aitchison College Lahore) Chak 7/1-AL(of mahalmis) CHAK 10/1.AL, KOT GUJJARAN o KAMYANA Chak No 8/1R AKHTARABAD, BAZEEDA, CHAK 11/1L, Chak 12/1-L, CHAK 13/1-L, CHAK 14/1-L, CHAK 18/1L, CHAK 22/1AL, CHAK 23/2L, CHAK 33/1AL, CHAK 4/1AL, CHAK 4/GD, CHAK 5/1RA, CHAK NO 4/1RA, CHAK 6/1L, CHAK 4/1.L, CHAK 7/1R, KAMAN, MOPALKEY, RENALA-1, RENALA-2 || 18	

The district is also represented in the National Assembly, by 4 elected members who represent the following constituencies:

Constituency	Member	Party
NA-141	Ch. Nadeem Abbas Rabbera	PML(N)
NA-142	Riaz ul Haq	PML(N)
NA-143	Rao Muhammad Ajmal Khan	PML(N)
NA-144	Muhammad Moeen Wattoo	PML(N)
Total	4	

== Notable people ==
- Bushra Bibi – wife of Imran Khan
- Syed Samsam Bukhari – Politician
- Aftab Iqbal – Journalist
- Younis Iqbal – Social Activist and Founder/Chairman Anjuman Muzareen Movement
- Rao Sikandar Iqbal – Politician
- Zafar Iqbal – Poet and Columnist
- Ajmal Kasab – 2008 Mumbai Attacks terrorist
- Zakiur Rehman Lakhvi – Lashkar e taiba terrorist
- Rai Ahmad Khan Kharal – Historic Hero
- Ghulam Ali Okarvi – Scholar
- Indrias Rehmat – Bishop of the Roman Catholic Diocese of Faisalabad.
- Manzoor Wattoo – Politician, Former Chief Minister of Punjab
- Saieen Zahoor – Sufi Musician
- Mian Yawar Zaman – Politician
- Mufti Ahmad Yar Khan Okarvi – Scholar
- Samina Noor – Politician mian Mohammed Muneer-politician

== See also ==
Thatta Ghulamka Doll Village of Pakistan in Okara
