= Okara, Pakistan =

City in Punjab, Pakistan

Okara اوکاڑہ (Punjabi)
- City
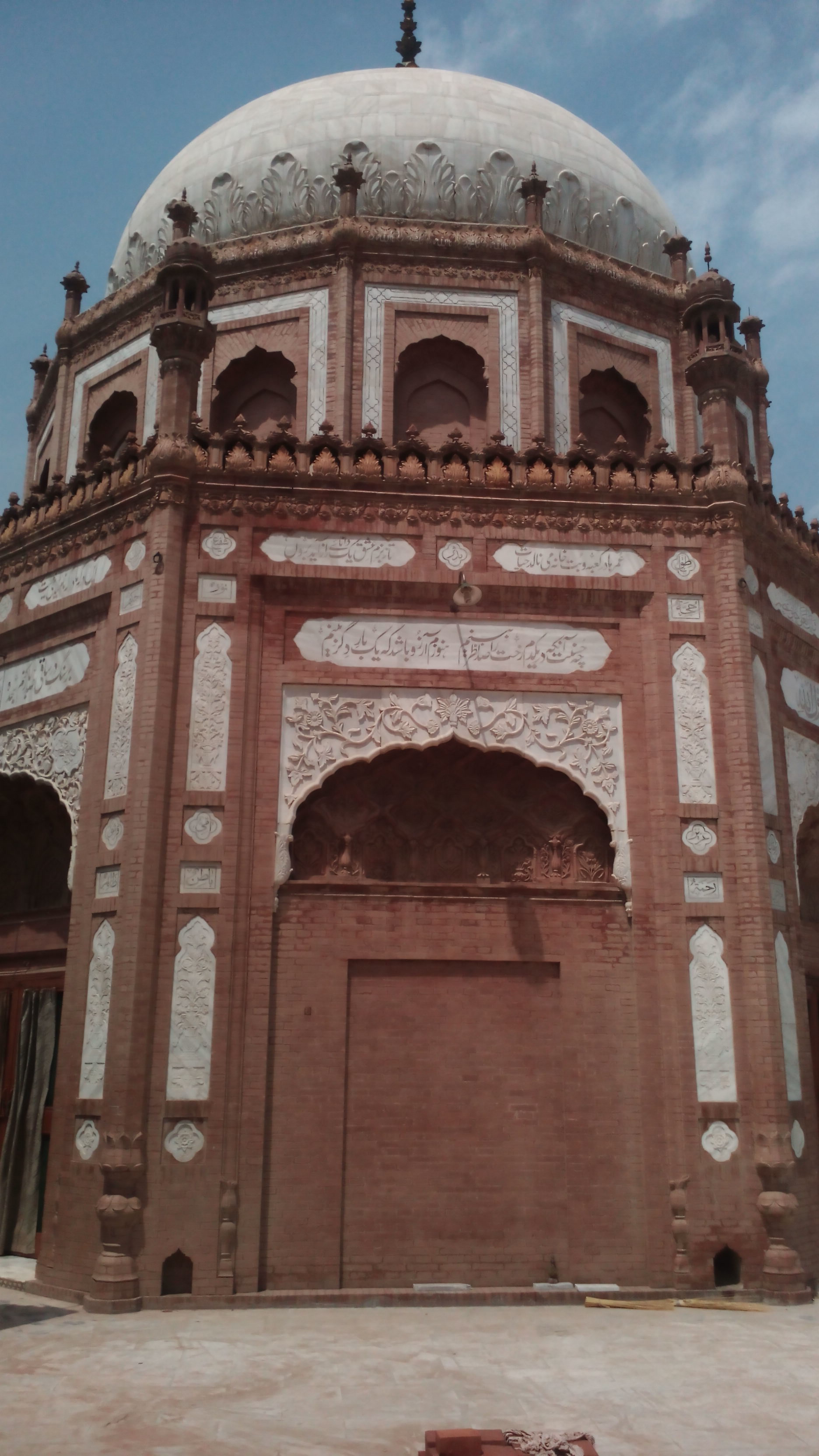
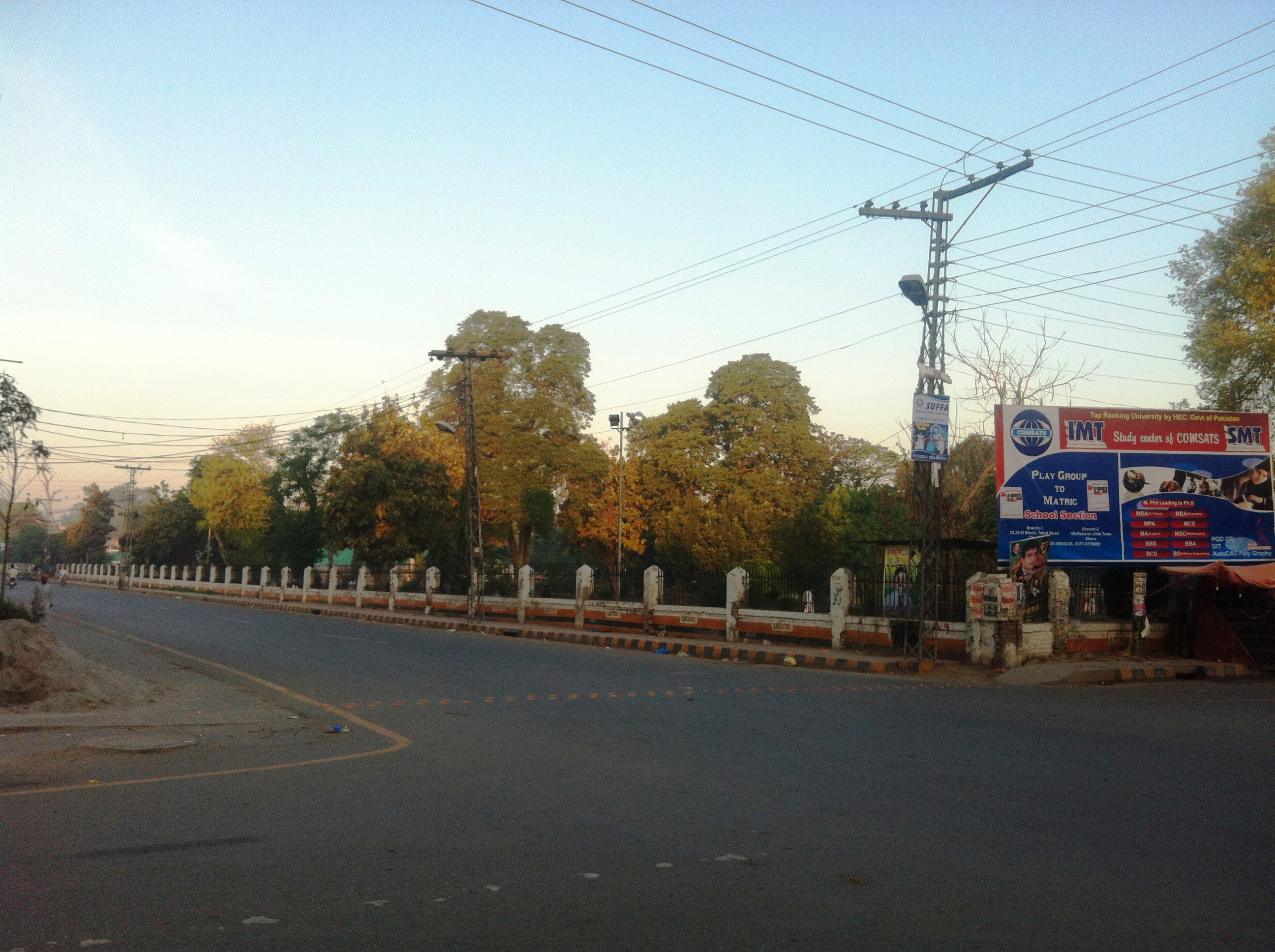
- The shrine of Khoo Pak, Company Bagh

- Location of Okara Okara (Pakistan)
- Coordinates: 30°48′33″N 73°27′13″E
- Country: Pakistan
- Province: (Punjab, Pakistan) Punjab
- Division: Sahiwal
- District: Okara

Government
  - Deputy Commissioner: Doctor Zeeshan Hanif

Area
  - Metro: 4,377 km^{2} (1,690 sq mi)
- Elevation: 105 m (344 ft)

Population (2023 census)
  - City: 533,693
  - Rank: 20th in Pakistan
- Time zone: UTC+5 (PST)
- Postal code: 56300
- Area code: 044
- Highways: N-5
- Number of Union councils: 140
- Website: okara.punjab.gov.pk

Okara (Punjabi, Urdu: اوکاڑہ) is the capital city of Okara District in the Punjab province of Pakistan. The name Okara is derived from Okaan, a type of tree. In ancient times there were a large number of Okaan trees, which is why the area was named Okara. It is the 20th most populous city of Pakistan. The city is located southwest of the city of Lahore and Faisalabad is 100 km bypassing the Ravi River. It is known for its agriculture-based economy and cotton mills. The nearest major city to Okara is Sahiwal, which was formerly known as Montgomery. Kasur is also located in the east of the city. Pakistan military dairy farms, known for their cheese, are situated in Okara. Pul Dhool, located near Abdulla Sugar Mill, is a town in the Okara district. Pul Dhool is on Hujra Chunian road. It is 9 km from Shah Muqeem and 17 km from Chunian.These farms were established before the creation of Pakistan in 1947.

== Climate ==
The climate of Okara is usually warm and dry, except during the summer monsoon season between June and September. The coldest months are December to February, when temperatures may drop to 3 °C (37 °F), with moderate rainfall. The hottest months are May to July, when temperatures may reach 45 °C (113 °F). The annual average rainfall in the city is approximately 615 millimetres (24.2 in).

== History ==
Okara is a relatively new agricultural city. During the period of British rule there was a forest of Okaan where the city has been rebuilt, and from this, the name of the city was derived. During British rule, the area was part of Montgomery District and contained a large saltpeter refinery. There are many textile mills in Okara. The predominantly Muslim population supported the Muslim League and the Pakistan Movement. After the independence of Pakistan in 1947 the Muslim refugees settled in the Okara District. In 1982, the city became the headquarters of the newly created Okara District. Okara has had a railway line since 1892.

Okara is known for its cattle breed known as Sahiwal and a water buffalo breed known as Niliravi. It is very rich in livestock population and production. Livestock Production Research Institute Bahadar Nagar Farm is a very large government farm near Okara. The farm has many cows, buffalo, bulls (for reproduction), goats, and sheep.

== Administration ==
The city of Okara serves as district and tehsil capital and is itself administratively subdivided into ten Union councils.

== Politics ==
Political leaders

- NA-135 Chaudhary Nadeem Abbas Rbaira kharal
- NA-136 Chaudhry Riaz-ul-Haq
- NA-137 Peer Saeyyud Ali Raza Gilaami
- NA-138 Mian Moeen Ahmed Khan Thakar Ka Wuttoo
- PP-188 Mian Yawar Zaman from Burj jeway khan
- PP-189 Mian Muhammad Munir from Burj jeway khan
- NA-143 Nadeem Abbas Rabera(2018 to 2023)

== Sights ==
- Kaluwal
- Hujra Shah Muqeem
- Chak No.37/4-L Jhakhran Waala
- Chak No.35/G-D Jhakhar Chaok Faisal Abaad Road Okara
- Chak No.50/D Jhakhran Waala
- Chak No.37-38/4-L Jhakhran Wala or Souka Chak or Pakka Khooh
- Chak No.28/2-R Jhakhran Waala
- Mopaalkay
- Choochuk
- Baazeeduh
- Baama Baala & Baama Zaireen
- Kohluh
- Laashaarian
- Joyia
- Outhwaal Jaageer
- Jundraakuh
- Busti Kesa
- Joota or Taariq Abaad
- Shair K Baala & Shair K Zaireen
- Lai Baala & Lai Zaireen
- Tibbi Silaabut
- Mailoo K
- Thuthuh Chaakur Ka Raw-ay Moushtaaq Waala
- Satluj River
- Ravi River
- Chak 14 Gd Tehsildar
- Lower Bari Doab Canal
- Satghara
- Naul Plot
- Jaboka
- Chak 16 1R
- Kho Pak Darbar
- Tiba Tehsildar Historical

== Demographics ==
Population

Historical population

Year	Pop.	±% p.a.
1972	84,334	—
1981	127,455	+4.70%
1998	201,815	+2.74%

Year	Pop.	±% p.a.
2017	358,146	+3.06%
2023	533,693	+6.87%

=== Languages ===
Languages of Okara City
1. Punjabi (86.3%)
2. Urdu (12.8%)
3. Pashto (0.40%)
4. Others (0.50%)

In the 2023 census, 86.3% spoke Punjabi, 12.8% spoke Urdu, 0.4% spoke Pashto and an additional 0.5% spoke other minor languages (mostly Sindhi and Balochi). The main Punjabi dialects in the area are Majhi and Jhangvi.

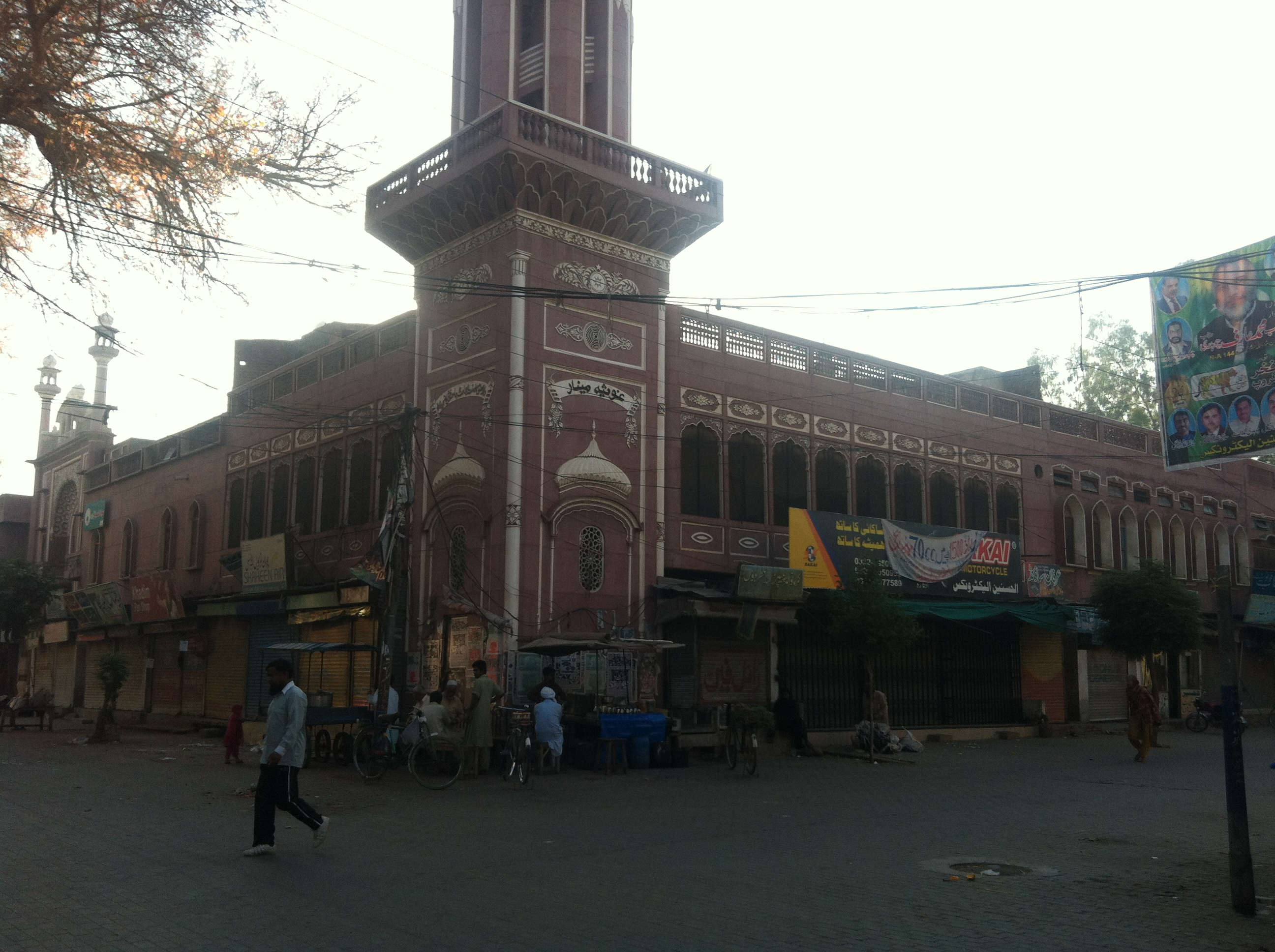
Ghausia Masjid Katchery Bazar, Okara

=== Parks and Recreational Facilities ===
Safdar Shaheed Park and Jinnah Park are the two main parks in Okara city. Apart from these two, there are few others parks including Gulshan e Fatima Park, Mehboob Alam Park, Lalazar colony park etc.
