= Bhone Manzebta =

Bhone Manzabta is a village and union council of Okara District, in Punjab, Pakistan. It is part of Depalpur Tehsil. Bhone Manzebta is situated equidistant between Basirpur and Hujra Shah Muqeem.

Bhone Manzebta village is of considerable antiquity and is located near Behlolpur.

The village has two access roads. One issues from the Basirpur-Depalpur road at Thokar Gama Wahgra and passes through villages Dhabby and Somian Bholo. The other issues from the Hujra-Haveli road at Paeray Wala. The population is predominantly agriculturist. The village is inhabited by Dogars. Bhone Manzabta is a village full of old memories like the gate of Sukha House and a gurdwara which shows the old civilization of this village. All the facilities are available here: Govt Middle School for boys and primary school for girls, union council, a BHQ and a hospital for animals.
