= Khangran Wala =

Village in Okara District, Punjab, Pakistan

Khangran Wala کھنگراں والا
- Village
- Khangran Wala Village Aerial View.jpg Aerial view of Khangran Wala village
- Location of Khangran Wala in Pakistan
- Coordinates: 30°49′55.5″N 73°43′01.1″E
- Country: Pakistan
- Province: Punjab, Pakistan
- District: Okara District
- Tehsil: Depalpur

Population
  - Total: 1,181
- Time zone: UTC+5 (PST)
- Postal code: 56140

Khangran Wala (کھنگراں والا) is a village in Depalpur Tehsil, Okara District, Punjab, Pakistan, situated near the town of Shergarh. It lies on elevated ground along the old bed of the Beas River, which formerly ran from Kasur through Chunian to Shergarh before the river shifted course. This former riverbed forms a central ridge running northeast to southwest through Okara District, locally known as the Dhaya (ڈھایہ), which serves as the natural boundary between Depalpur Tehsil to the east and Renala Khurd Tehsil to the west. The village incorporates three formerly distinct localities, Hassan Pura, Kot Nader Shah, and Khangran Wala, which have merged into a single settlement. Administratively, it falls within Union Council Shergarh and the Municipal Committee of Shergarh.

Khangran Wala is situated on the old bed of the Beas River, which historically flowed through this part of Punjab before shifting course. The elevated ridge on which the village stands marks the former river channel and forms the watershed between the two halves of Okara District. To the west of the ridge, in Okara and Renala Khurd tehsils, subsoil water is brackish and agriculture is dependent on canal irrigation; to the east, in Depalpur Tehsil, the subsoil water is fresh and suitable for cultivation by tubewell.

== Geography and history ==
An explanatory video showing the height and slope (uthar and hethar) of ancient soil mounds in Khangran Wala village.

"Khangran Wala is situated in an area with a distinct natural elevation. The village is located on higher ground, approximately 20 to 25 feet above the surrounding low-lying plains. Geographically, this region has historically been associated with the ancient banks of the Beas River, dating back to the pre-Christian era. The area between Kasur in the east and Okara in the west, spanning roughly 150 kilometers, features a unique topographical divide. The higher elevated areas, locally known as [Uttar (اوتاڑ)], contrast with the lower-lying plains, locally referred to as [Hathar (ہیٹھاڑ)] or Depalpur side, which gradually slopes towards the Sutlej River. This natural landscape has been a defining feature of the local terrain between the Ravi and Sutlej rivers for centuries."

تصویر کا کیپشن

Topographical elevation map of Khangran Wala village

== Transportation and connectivity ==
Khangran Wala is located in a strategically important area with convenient access to several surrounding cities and towns. The approximate road distances from Khangran Wala are as follows:

- Shergarh: 1.5 km
- Hujra Shah Muqeem: 12 km
- Akhtarabad: 15 km
- Renala Khurd: 16 km
- Habibabad: 17 km
- Chunian: 32 km
- Okara: 32 km
- Lahore: 116 km
- Depalpur: 24 Km.

== Demography ==
Khangran Wala (کھنگراں والا) is a significant locality of Shergarh. The area is home to various tribes and families, with the Bhutta (surname) بھٹہ family being the most prominent. Other tribes present in smaller numbers include the Meher ,Wattoo, Dogar, and Jhuraira. The residents are primarily associated with the agriculture sector, focusing on wheat (گندم) , rice (چاول), cotton (کپاس) , maize (مکی), potato (آلو) , mustard (سرسوں) and sugarcane (گنا). Many individuals work as laborers in these fields، performing tasks such as harvesting and planting crops. many residents work as manual laborers alongside masons for construction projects. many are also engaged in other professions. This includes livestock farming and sheep/goat herding (چرواہا ). Furthermore, a portion of the population in government services, like Pakistan army, police, teaching, and healthcare, operates local shops, or is employed in various factories."

== Administration ==
The village recorded a population of 1,181 at the time of notification in the Punjab Gazette of 6 December 2019. According to the Punjab Gazette of 4 March 2026, Khangran Wala falls within the Shergarh Municipal Committee, which comprises twelve revenue estates with a combined population of 33,718.
