= Shergarh, Punjab =

Shergarh شیر گڑھ
- Municipal Committee
- Location of Shergarh in Pakistan
- Coordinates: 30°49′41″N 73°44′18″E
- Country: Pakistan
- Province: Punjab
- District: Okara
- Tehsil: Depalpur

Population (2023)
  - Municipal Committee: 33,718
  - Urban: 16,805
  - Urban (Shergarh City): 16,805
- (Total Municipal Committee)
- Time zone: UTC+5 (PST)
- Postal code: 56140

Shergarh is a historic town and a prominent commercial hub located in the Depalpur Tehsil of Okara District, in the Punjab province of Pakistan. According to The Punjab Gazette (March 2026), the Shergarh Municipal Committee comprises 12 revenue estates with a total population of 33,718, while the specific urban population of Shergarh city is 16,805. The town is widely known for the shrine of the Sufi saint, Daud Bandagi Kirmani, and operates under the postal code 56140.

== Localities and suburbs ==
The residential and agricultural expansion of Shergarh includes several integrated localities that share common administrative and electoral structures.

Khangranwala (Urdu: کھنگراں والا) 30°49′55.6″N 73°43′01.0″E: Situated adjacent to the Government Food Grain Godowns (محکمہ فوڈ کے غلہ گودام), this locality is a vital part of Shergarh. Demographics: Various communities reside here, with the Bhutta family being the most prominent. Other tribes present in smaller numbers include the Wattoo, Dogar, and Jaraira. The residents are primarily associated with the agriculture sector, focusing on wheat and sugarcane.

Khangranwala is an ancient settlement located 1.5 km West of Shergarh, with a population of approximately 1181 residents. According to historian Javed Iqbal (MA History & DAE), the village has a recorded lineage of over eight generations. Relocated to the elevated Outar (uplands) about 55 years ago due to waterlogging in the lowlands, it has now merged with the neighboring settlements of Kot Nadir Shah (Mehar family) and Hassanpura (Joya family).

=== Geography and location ===
The village sits on the ancient bed of the River Beas, divided into Hathar (lowlands) and Outar (elevated uplands). The current settlement is built on the Outar, rising 15-20 feet above the plains. Distances from major cities:

- Shergarh: 1.5 km.
- Akhtarabad / Hujra Shah Muqeem: 12 km.
- Renala Khurd: 15 km.
- Habibabad: 17 km
- Depalpur: 27 km
- Okara: 32 km
- Lahore: 110 km.

=== Sports legacy ===
The village has a rich tradition in sports.

- Kabaddi: Legendary figures include Haji Ghulam Muhammad (alias Chota Goma), Muhammad Sultan (expert Traditional Tracker/Khoji), and Ahmad Din.
- Cricket: The village has a dedicated cricket ground. Prominent players from the golden era include Mehar Abdul Rauf, Mehar Sultan Mahmood, Mehar Abdul Shakoor, Mehar Saleem, Muhammad Sabir, Javed Iqbal, Murtaza, Allah Ditta, Ali Hassan, and Ali Hasnain.

=== Political background ===
Historically, the political representation of Khangranwala has been led by the Mehar family. Mehar Muhammad Yasin served as a prominent elected Councilor of Union Council Shergarh and played a vital role in the area's development. Following his legacy, his son Mehar Muhammad Arif also entered local politics and contested the election for the Nazim of the Union Council.

=== Infrastructure and community projects ===
The village is home to three mosques, an ancient cemetery, and a funeral prayer ground (Janazagah). A notable self-help Clean Drinking Water Project was established in collaboration with the Al-Khidmat Foundation. Spearheaded by Mehar Abdul Rauf and engineered by Javed Iqbal (MA History & DAE)—who was responsible for the mapping, technical layout, and elevation measurements—the project provides fresh water via seven distribution points across the village.

== Demographics ==
According to the Punjab Gazette (March 2026), the Shergarh Municipal Committee consists of 12 revenue estates and surrounding villages with a collective population of 33,718. The demographics include:

- Shergarh City (Urban): 16,805
- Included Revenue Estates & Villages: Chak No. 023/D, Chak No. 020/D, Chak No. 026/D, Chak No. 022/D, Chak No. 017/D, Bonga Sodi Wala, Chak No. 025/D, Hussain Garh, Rahmat Wala, Chak Walayat Ali, and Chak No. 021/D.
- Other Localities:
    - Khangran Wala
    - Kot Nadir Shah
    - Hassan Pura.

== Connectivity ==
Shergarh is a well-connected hub in the Okara District, linked to several major cities and towns through a network of roads:

- Shergarh–Renala Khurd Road
- Shergarh–Akhtarabad Road
- Shergarh–Hujra Shah Muqeem Road
- Shergarh–Depalpur Road
- Shergarh–Chunian Road.

== History ==
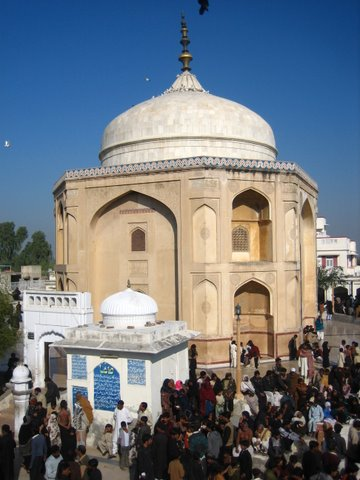
Shergarh Shrine, Winter 2008

Sher Garh (literally "Lion's Den") is one of the most historic towns of the district, along with Haveli Lakha, Hujra Shah Muqeem, Basir Pur, Depalpur & Satghara among others. The 16th-century governor of Multan, Fateh Jang Khan, named the town after the Afghan ruler of India, Sher Shah Suri, who built a mud fort and had an encampment around the town. This is recorded in Abbas Khan Sarauni's book, "Tarikh-e-Sher Shah Suri" (History of Sher Shah Suri). Ancient coins & artefacts have been found, proving that the town was inhabited in the time of the Kushan Dynasty.

The town is known for a famous late-sixteenth century Qadiriyyah Sufi saint, Daud Bandagi Kirmani, who lived and died in the town. He was born in Sitapur, village of modern-day Muzaffargarh District.His family had migrated from Kerman Province in Persia, and claimed descent from Prophet Mohammad.After receiving his formal religious and spiritual education from the pirs of Uch, he established himself in Shergarh, where he lived from then on until his death. He converted many tribes in the present-day districts of Faisalabad, Sialkot Sheikhupura. Hafizabad, Sahiwal & Gujranwala, and although he lived in Shergarh, he did not carry out much of his work in that area because most of the native tribes, such as the Wattu and Joiya had already previously been converted by Baba Farid of Pakpattan. The tribes converted by Daud Bandagi Kirmani include mainly Arain,Rajput & Jat clans of the above-mentioned areas. Some of these are Virks, Bajwas, Cheemas, Chatthas & Sahis.He is claimed to have converted 35,000 people to Islam, and 365 people to sainthood in all. Some of his prominent murids include Bala Pir, 'Abd al-Qadir Bada'uni, Wahab Chishti & Kamal Chishti. The saint died in 1575, after which his nephew and son-in law, Shah Abul Mu'aali, had a beautiful, large mausoleum erected for his grave. This mausoleum is visited by many "murids" in the month of March, when his urs is held. Apart from his murids, the mausoleum attracts the attention of many curious travellers, artists & calligraphers all year round, as this mausoleum is one of the rare monuments in the country which has calligraphy and tile work in the "Naqashi style". The shrine used to be in the care of the local "Gaddi Nashin" (eldest direct descendant), but after the land reforms of Ayub Khan, it was turned to the Auqaf Deptt, Okara.

== Language ==
Most of the people of Shergarh speak Punjabi.

== Agriculture and surroundings ==
The town itself is located on the old river bed of the Beas, which extends south from Kasur, all the way to Chunian, and then Shergarh, in Okara District, before moving towards Gaimbar near Okara City. The mounds of the riverbed also act as a natural border between Renala Khurd Tehsil & Depalpur Tehsil. The subsoil water of the town itself is brackish, as well as the area in the west of the river bed. Towards the east green fields of potato, rice, maize and wheat, bordered on all sides by kikari and simbal are visible up to the horizon, as the area, below the riverbed, has subsoil water which is sweet, and rich in nutrients, unlike the brackish subsoil water on and west of the riverbed. when you go on chunian road, Hussain Garh the famous and historical village is there.this village has seven small village namely Hussain Garh, Tilawala, Landianwala, Kot Nawab Shah, Zameer Abad, Kot Khadim Hussain, ghurianwala.

== Education and infrastructure ==
Shergarh has a majority of people who cannot afford education, which is why in 1992, S.M Mohsin set up an NGO called "AKRA" (Anjuman-e Khuddam-e Rasulallah). At that time the NGO responsibility was given to Mirza Aziz Ahmed Baig, who, with the support of S.M Moshin, remained in charge of the foundation for 28 years and spread education throughout the village. The organisation lays more stress on educating females. The main school is in Shergarh, called "Daud Bandagi High School". It also has many branches in the surrounding villages, whose mediums are usually mosques, but the main school is in Shergarh. The town consists of a NBP bank, a Jamia Mosque and a Government school. It has a small, non-functional dispensary, and the town is in dire need of a hospital. The district Nazim, Syed Sajjad Haider Kirmani, who is a native of the town, also got a sports stadium built just outside it, however since he has died, the project remains incomplete and is being used for anything but sports. The Jamia Mosque was a historical building built by Sher Shah Suri, but it was in bad condition and rebuilt by the Auqaf Department, Okara.

As of 2015 Shergarh had more than 15 schools and a high literacy rate.

Shergarh is connected by road to six towns, namely Chunian, Wan Radha Ram, Depalpur Tehsil|Depalpur, Renala Khurd, Akhtarabad & Hujra Shah Muqeem. The road leading to Renala Khurd is the best maintained road leading into Shergarh, it was built when Syed Sajjad Haider Kirmani was nazim of the district. The road leading to the town of Hujra Shah Muqeem, is 7.5 miles long and is also in a good condition, but quite narrow. In historic times, the pirs of Shergarh and Hujra Shah Muqeem|Hujra, did not get along very well, so when they'd refer to each other's towns, they'd use the derogatory name of the time, panjkoa (7 miles away), instead of using the proper names. The other roads are very dangerous as most of them have deep depressions making it very difficult to drive. The road leading to the town of Akhtarabad is famous for robberies and killings that occur mostly after sun- Shergarh consist of Govt boys higher secondary school and Govt girls higher secondary in sher garh gives the education all over villages and town sher garh and no available the any collage but very important requirement the boys and girls collage at city.

== Famous people ==
- Syed Jaffar Kirmani a hockey player who represented the united Indian field hockey team in 1932 and 1936 and won two gold medals.

== Main tribes ==
- Dhudhi
- khokhar
- Akhund
- Arain
- Bhutta
- Bhutto
- Ensari
- Hashmi
- Baloch
- Bhatti
- Chauhan
- Daula
- Jappa
- Jurrera
- Joiya
- Kasai
- Kirmani
- Kumhar
- Lohar
- Mughal
- Machhi
- Mirasi
- Mochi
- Nai
- Pathan
- Qazi
- Ranghar
- Rajput
- Shaikh
- Sial
- Tarkhan
- Wattu
- Khakhra.

== See also ==
- Habibabad
- Daud Bandagi Kirmani
- Depalpur
- Hujra Shah Muqeem
- Okara District
- Qadiriyya
- Renala Khurd
- Sufism
- Sayed Jaffar Shah
