= Bhumman Shah =

Udasi saint (1687–1762)

Baba Bhumman Shah Udasin
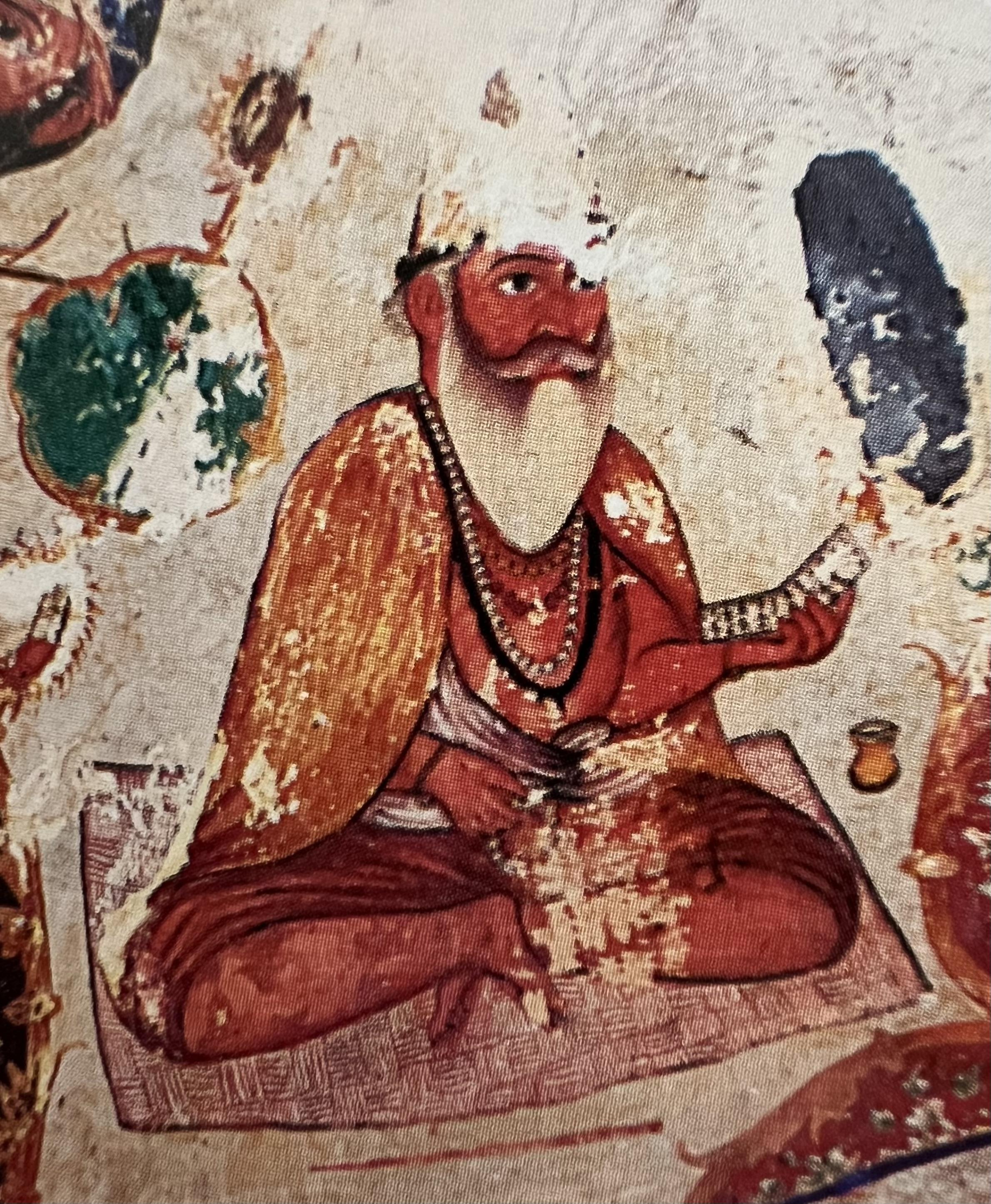
- Mural depicting Baba Bhuman Shah, from Dera Baba Bhuman Shah, Depalpur, Okara district, Punjab, Pakistan, ca.1910

Personal life
- Born: Bhumia Hassa; 14 April 1687 Behlolpur
- Died: 1762 (aged 74–75)
- Parent(s): Hassa Ram (father); Rajo Bai (mother)

Religious life
- Religion: Udasi

Senior posting
- Based in: Depalpur

Bhumman Shah (14 April 1687 – 1762, also spelt as Bhuman Shah, born Bhumia Hassa) was an Udasi saint. (Note: There are many spelling variations for his name, such as 'Bhuman', 'Bhoman', 'Bhumman', 'Bhomman', 'Boman', or 'Bomman'.)

== Early life ==
He was born in Behlolpur to Hassa Ram and Rajo Bai. His family revered Sri Chand, the eldest son of the first Sikh guru, Guru Nanak. There are several legends and myths connected with Bhumia's early childhood. The story goes that once as a kid, when he was sleeping in his cradle, a cobra came and sat over his chest with his hood spread wide-apart. Mother Rajo was stunned at the scene but as she dared to approach the cradle, the cobra disappeared slowly with no harm to the sleeping kid. Another myth relates to the revival of the dead sparrows; and yet another one deals with restoring to health the lost crops of a poor farmer......so forth and so on. These were taken to be miracles and the peoples from far and wide started to crowd at Bhumia house to have his darshan.

Bhumia went for his schooling at the age of seven. He was very sharp and intelligent student and imbibed the essentials of Hinduism, Sikhism and Islam at a very young age. Besides attending to his religious lessons, Bhumia also performed the worldly chores like grazing cows in the company of other boys of his village. He would take his cows to the forest where he would also carry plenty of food and Jal (water) to run a free-kitchen (Langar) for the passers-by including the ascetics, saints, the poor and the orphans.

Little later, the family would move from Behlolpur to Deepalpur.

== Initiation ==
By the age of fifteen, Bhumia had developed a strong aspiration to become a monk. With the permission of his parents he approached Baba Pritam Das of Pakpattan, the prominent Saint of Udasin Panth who initiated him into a Guru-mantra. On being formally initiated and baptized by Baba Pritam Dass, Bhumia himself became Baba Bhumman Shah. Soon afterwards, he started to preach the religious messages which were always accompanied by Kirtan and free-kitchen (Langar).

It is stated that Chaudhury Lakha Wattu, a Muslim Rajput landlord of village Kutub Kot had been arrested for some reasons and was put behind the bars at Lahore by the orders of the Governor of Punjab. Bibi Bakhtawar, Lakha's mother, was a staunch devotee of the Baba. She solicited Baba's blessings for the release of her son and it so happened that Chaudhury Lakha was released from the jail within couple of days. As a result, Lakha and his numerous Muslim relatives from the Wattu tribe also became devoted followers of the Baba. In addition, the tribe also surrendered a village named Kutub-Kot to the Baba which the latter made the centre of his religious activities.

== Career ==
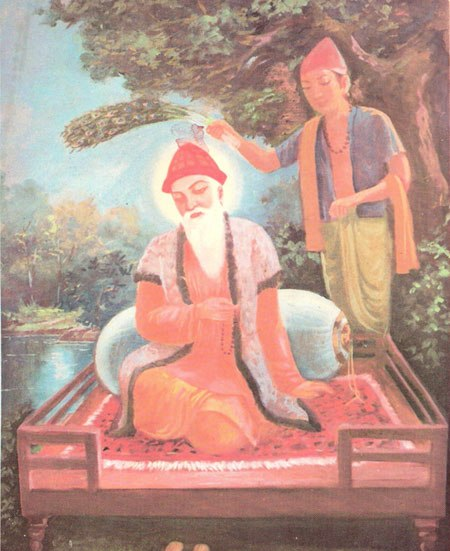
Modern painting of Baba Bhumman Shah

Baba Bhumman Shah travelled from village to village to preach his message of love, peaceful coexistence, universal brotherhood, religious-tolerance and equality. He had followers from many denominations including Hindus, Sikhs and Muslims.

Baba also visited the Dargah of Sufi Saint Baba Farid, Golden Temple at Amritsar, and numerous other, Muslim, Sikh and Hindu shrines during his religious itineraries. At village Kutub-Kot, which later became renowned as Dera Baba Bhumman Shah, Baba permanently established the maryada of Kirtan and free kitchen (Langar).

Baba was also a very dedicated Sikh of Guru Gobind Singh. It is told that once, Dashmesh Guru and his Sikh followers were going to Nili Bar when they visited Baba Bhumman Shah and took Langar at the Dera; pleased with Shah's noble mission, Gobind Singh blessed him that his Langar would continue to grow with no shortage of any kind.

Baba's life work can be seen to be around harmony and oneness. After carrying out his religious mission for well over 50 years, Baba died in 1762 CE. He was succeeded by Mahant Nirmal Chand, who continued his work.

== Legacy ==
During the times of sixth Mahant Baba Darshan Dass, a British Divisional Commissioner visited the Dera. Impressed by Mahant's personality as well as the Dera-complex and the free-kitchen service (Langar), the Commissioner attached 3000 acres (12 km^{2}) of agricultural land as fief to the shrine (Baba Bhuman Shah by Sant Chandra Swami).

Total landed property in the name of Shrine grew well over 18,000 acres (73 km^{2}) of agricultural land (cf: 18700 acres (76 km^{2}) in the name of Gurudwara Sri Nankana Sahib in Sheikhupura). Besides landed property, there was other moveable/immoveable property in the name of the Dera.

An Udasi Akhara attached to his name, named Dera Baba Bhuman Shah, was established at his haveli in Depalpur, Okara, Punjab but it now lies in ruins in modern-day Pakistan. The site contains many historical structures and murals, now in a dilapidated, vandalized, and neglected state.

=== List of successors ===
Below is a list of the successive mahants of the dera of Bhuman Shah:

1. Bhuman Shah (1702–1747)

2. Nirmal Chand (1747–1772)

3. Bhawani Das (1772–1820)

4. Lal Chand (1820–1822)

5. Lodeen Chand (1824–1836)

6. Darshan Das (1836–1868)

7. Santokh Das (1868–1893)

8. Narayan Das (1893–1899)

9. Harbhajan Das (1899–1925)

10. Girdhari Das (1925–1977)

11. Amar Das (1977–2003)

12. Chandar Swami (1977–present)

13. Sewa Das (1995–2016)

14. Braham Das (2003–present)

15. Harinam Das (2016–present)

== Post-Partition scenario ==
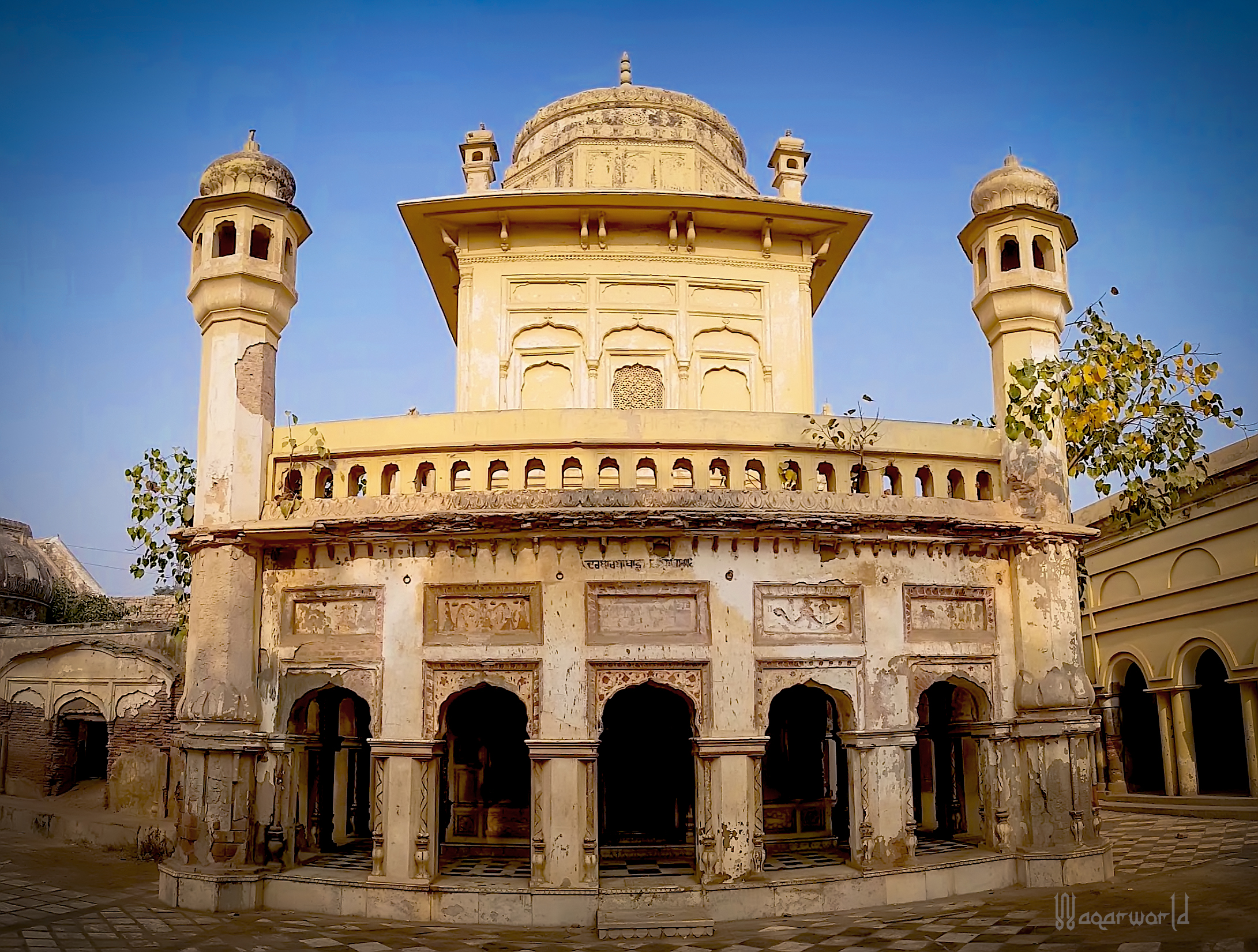
Samadh of Bhumman Shah in Depalpur, Okara district, Punjab, Pakistan, photographed on 7 December 2018.

After partition, due to compulsions of politics, Mahant Girdhari Dass, the Mukh Sewadar of the Dera, shifted his religious headquarters from Pakistan to India. A new Shrine and Dera was established in Sangar Sadan in Sirsa District in Haryana. The total land transferred to the Dera from Pakistan was a meagre 1600 acres (6.5 km^{2}) compared to over 18000 acres (73 km^{2}) in Montgomery. After Mahant Girdhari Dass's death, Baba Mahant Amar Nath Bawa was the mahant of the shrine in Sangar Sadan. After Amar Nath's Death, simultaneously Baba Sewa Das Ji was honoured with tilak rasam(Gaddinasheen) in Dera Mallewala Sirsa The 12th Mahant of Dera Baba Bhuman Shah Ji and The Mahant Saran Dass applying tilak rasam(Gaddinasheen) to Baba Braham Dass. After that Baba Brahm Dass ji into Mahant Baba Braham Dass Ji is the 14th Mahant of Dera Baba Bhuman Shah Ji Sangar Sarista (Sirsa).

Besides Sangar Sadan, the Hindu devotees of the Baba have also built several temples in his memory in a number of states of northern India as well, where daily worship unto Babaji is offered with faith and love (Baba Bhuman Shah by Sant Chandra Swami).

In Pakistan, this Dera was considered the richest with huge property attached to it in pre-partition times.

The spiritual and pragmatic teachings of Baba Bhuman Shah have been presented in the form of aphorisms in a booklet by his ardent devotee, Sage Chandra Swami, with a focus on true goal of life as well as the right means for its achievement. These teachings are in complete concordance with Baba's own divine life.

== See also ==
- Bhoman Shah
