= Farid Pur Sohag =

فرِيد پُور سُہاگ
- Village
- Faridpur Suhag

Faridpur Suhag (Urdu: فرِيد پُور سُہاگ) is a village and union council in Depalpur Tehsil, Okara District, Punjab, Pakistan. It is situated east of Haveli Lakha.
