= Behlol Pur =

Behlol Pur may refer to:

- Behlol Pur, Gujrat
- Behlol Pur, Okara
