= Gulsher =

Gulsher is a village adjacent to Basirpur, Depalpur, Okara District, in Pakistan's Punjab province.

Originally an agricultural area, the local economy has expanded to include quarrying, transport, and remittances from relatives working in other areas.
