= Amjad Ali Shakir =

Pakistani writer and an educationist

- امجد علی شاکر
- Born: 1954 (age 71–72); Lahore District
- Education: University of the Punjab, University of Multan
- Occupations: Writer, Educationist

Amjad Ali Shakir (Urdu: امجد علی شاکر) is a Pakistani writer and an educationist. He studied at the University of the Punjab and University of Multan in 1977. He started his career in education as a lecturer in 1979 at Govt College Bahawalnagar and served as principal of various colleges before retiring in 2014. He has written books on various topics, including history, research, and sketches.

== Early life and education ==
Shakir was born to Abdul Qadir, a graduate of Darul Uloom Deoband. Amid an educated environment at home, he passed 10th grade at Govt High School Basirpur, Lahore at the age of 15 in 1969. Then he entered to Municipal Degree College Okara (now Govt Postgraduate College Okara) and did his B.A from the University of the Punjab. He did his M.A. in Urdu as a private student from the University of Multan (now Bahauddin Zakariya University) in 1977.

== Career ==
He started his service in education as a lecturer on 17 Feb 1979 at Govt college Bahawalnagar. After spending one year he was transferred to Govt college Pakpatan, where he spent four years. Then transferred to Govt College, Dipalpur, and served here relatively for a long time.

In 1992, he was promoted to assistant professor and transferred to Govt college Kasur, shortly he then transferred to Govt College Ravi Road Shahdara, Lahore 1993. He was transferred as a principal to Govt college Kasur again and stayed here for 10 years. After that, he was promoted to grade 20 and served as principal in various colleges and retired as principal in 2014.

== Views about government colleges ==
According to Shakir, government colleges in Pakistan have adequate infrastructure and facilities, including well-equipped laboratories and libraries with more resources than private colleges. He believes that teachers have a responsibility to approach their work with dedication and passion, as the future of the nation depends on them.

== Literary works ==
Shakir has written books, three of which are of the Sketch genre, the other three are related to history and research while the remaining books discuss various topics.

Some of them are:

- Maulana Ubaidullah Sindhi and his philosophy of history (in Urdu)
- Iqbālīyāt ke poshīdah goshe (2009)(in Urdu)
- Rivāyat: shak̲h̲ṣī k̲h̲āke (2014) (in Urdu)
- Masnad (2014) (in Urdu)

== Bibliography ==
- Sawan, Shahid Rasool; Sahar, Abdul Aziz (2017). پروفیسر امجد علی شاکر کی علمی و ادبی خدمات [Professor Amjad Ali Shakir's Scientific and Literary Services] (M.phill thesis) (in Urdu). Islamabad: Allama Iqbal Open University.
