= Gawalmandi =

Neighborhood in Lahore, Punjab, Pakistan

Coordinates: 33°36′N 73°04′E

Gawalmandi گوالمنڈی
- Neighbourhood
- Country: Pakistan
- Province: Punjab
- City: Lahore
- Tehsil: Shalimar
- Union council No: 50

Gawalmandi (Punjabi, Urdu: گوالمنڈی) is a Neighbourhood located in Shalimar Tehsil of Lahore, Punjab, Pakistan.

It is regarded as the cultural centre of Lahore. The famous Gawalmandi Food Street of Lahore is located here. Gawalmandi is a fusion of two words: Gawala meaning milkman, and Mandi meaning market.

== Historical places ==
The area of Gawalmandi is surrounded by four road making a shape of irregular trapezium. 3 out of four roads are named after Lords of British Empire:

- Lord Nisbet
- Lord Chamberlain
- Lord McLeod

At the end of Nisbet Road and just at the junction of Qila Gujar Singh neighbourhood. The main square is called Maulana Zafar Ali Chowk. Lahore's third largest flea market is located at Gawalmandi chowk.

King Edward Medical University, which is the second oldest medical college in the Indian subcontinent is also located here. Mayo Hospital, which is the largest tertiary care hospital in region is located here as well, situated between Gawalmandi and the famous Anarkali bazaar.

The tomb of Shah Abdul-Maali is located within the vicinity of town as well as one of the oldest mosque called "Mai Laado" (Elder lady Laado) is located near Mayo Hospital, Lahore.
