= Randhir Khokharan =

Randheer Khokhran رندھیر کھوکھراں
- Village
- Interactive map of Randheer Khokhran
- Coordinates: 32°39′19″N 74°23′35″E
- Country: Pakistan
- Province: Punjab
- District: Gujrat

Randheer Khokhran is a village in Gujrat District, Punjab, Pakistan, Randhir Khokhran is situated near the villages Shakar Kot and Shampur Khokhran.

The residents are mostly farmers, many works in bigger cities and some have gone abroad for employment. A great number of young people also joins Pakistan armed forces and Punjab Police.

== Basic amenities ==
There are a few private and public schools in the village. Two public schools are the Government primary school for boys and Govt girls school, in addition to two private schools. The village has electricity, natural gas, and telephone services. The nearest healthcare facility is a Rural Health Centre, about 2 miles away.

== Transport ==
Daily bus and van services run between Head Marala, Tanda, Sialkot, and Gujrat. The road is metalled. The nearest airport is Sialkot International Airport.

== Local council ==
Village falls under Marilocal union council and local body that represents the local 10 or more villages. Members are elected every four years (legally but last local body elections held were decades ago). Elected members of the Union council of Mari then elect the Nazim/chairman.

== See also ==
- Kurree Sharif
- Mari Khokhran
