= Mahant Darshan =

Coordinates: 30°14′0″N 73°17′0″E

- Town and union council
- Interactive map of Mahant Darshan
- Country: Pakistan
- Province: Punjab
- District: Okara District
- Time zone: UTC+5 (PST)

Mahant Darshan is a town and union council of Depalpur Tehsil in Okara District of Punjab province, Pakistan. The town is located at 30°13'60N 73°16'60E at an altitude of 152 metres.
