= Klair Kalan =

Kalair Kalan
- Village
- Country: Pakistan
- Province: Punjab
- District: Okara
- Tehsil: Depalpur
- Time zone: UTC+5 (PST)

Klair Kalan is a town and union council of Depalpur Tehsil in Okara District of Punjab province, Pakistan. The union council consists of many villages, including Klair Mumhand, Attary, Kanda Bazideka, and Kahan Singh.
