= Mari Khokhran =

Village in Pakistan

Mari Khokharan is a remote village in Gujrat District, Central Punjab, Pakistan. It is situated on the bank of the Chenab River.

The residents are mostly farmers, although some have gone abroad for employment.

== Basic amenities ==
There are four schools in the village. Two public schools are the Government primary school for boys and Govt girls high school, in addition to two private schools. The village has electricity, natural gas, and telephone services. The nearest healthcare facility is a Rural Health Centre, about six miles away. GPS coordinates of the village are: Latitude: 32.669171 | Longitude: 74.410059

== Transport ==
Daily bus and van services run between Head Marala, Tanda, Sialkot, and Gujrat. The road is metalled. The nearest airport is Sialkot International Airport.

== Local council ==
Mari is a local union council and local body that represents the local 10 or more villages. Members are elected every four years. Elected members of the Union council of Mari then elect the Nazim

== See also ==
- Kurree Sharif
- Randhir Khokharan
