= Lal Jas Raj =

Lal Jas Raj also known as Maggar Pir was a Sufi saint who had a large number of Hindu disciples. The name Lal Jas Raj was given by his Hindu followers. He was patronized by the dhobis (washermen) and bhistis (water carriers) of the area.

A monastery of Lal Jas Raj is currently located in Dipalpur, Okara District, Punjab, Pakistan. Today the dilapidated and empty chamber stands infested with bats and rats. The doors to the chamber are jammed and a stairway is serving as storage for dried dung cakes of the neighbours.

The structure has gone into disrepair. There used to be a grand annual 'mela' here. Hindus would visit here for the Jhund or Mundan ceremony to shave off the heads of their sons. After the partition of India in 1947 the mela has stopped due to the exodus of the Hindu population from the area.

== Legend ==
According to legend Lal Jas Raj was the young son of Raja Dipa Chand, the founder of Dipalpur. The boy sank in the earth due to the curse of his stepmother Rani Dholran. Raja Dipa Chand constructed this monastery in the memory of his son.
