= Syed Khair ud Din =

17th-century Persian Sufi, Muslim preacher, religious scholar and a poet

Syed Khair ud Din سید خیرالدّین
- Born: Sherharg
- Died: Lahore
- Burial place: Lahore, Pakistan
- Occupation: Islamic Scholar
- Known for: Sufi Mysticism
- Title: Shah Abul Mali
- Father: Syed Rahamat Ullah
- Family: Syed

Syed Khair ud Din (Urdu: سید خیرالدّین) also known as Shah Abul Mali (Urdu: شاہ ابوالمالی) (1553-1616) was a Persian Sufi, Muslim preacher, religious scholar and a poet. He is a descendant of Abdul Qadir Gilani.

== Early life ==
He belonged to a Syed family of Kerman which migrated to Bahawalpur in 1394 CE. Then most this family migrated to Multan, and a part of this family migrated to Shergarh in 1630 CE. Syed Khair ud Din was born in Shergarh branch of this family. He spent his early years in seclusion by wandering in jungles and deserts to get close to Allah. Then he went to Delhi in the hope of getting Islamic and spiritual education, but an Islamic mystic there told him to return to Shergarh.

His travel to Delhi in search of education led him to meet 'Abd al-Haqq al-Dehlawi, both of them became very good friends and they kept on meeting each other from time to time for the rest of their lives. Dehlawi always considered Syed Kahir ud Din as his mentor and met to seek inspiration and guidance from him.

He returned to Shergarh where he became a student of Daud Bandagi Kirmani, and learned Islamic Fiqh and Islamic mysticism from him. Kirmani then sent him to Lahore with the responsibility of spreading Islam there.

== Career ==
In Lahore, Syed Khair ud Din managed to secure huge following from the people. The word of his intellect and knowledge reached the Mughal Prince Dara Shikoh, who paid a visit to him. Shaikoh records the visit in his book as follows;

I, in the company of Niamet Ali submitted to Shah Abul Mali presence; meanwhile a devotee submitted a beautiful Tasbeeh to Hazrat Saheb. I thought in my mind, it would be very fortunate for me if Shah sb bestowed this Tasbeeh to me. When, we intended to depart the session, Shah Sb called me and said you can take this Tasbeeh. He also advises me to read Doord on it 100 times daily that would reward you, me and original donator of Tasbeeh.

— Dara Shikoh, Seena-ul-Ulia

== Death ==
He died in Lahore. His shrine is located right next to the mosque in which he preached Islam during his stay in Lahore. His shrine was constructed in his lifetime and he himself oversaw its construction.

== Relatives ==
Syed Khair ud Din had two wives and eight sons. His first wife was the daughter of his teacher, Daud Bandagi Kirmani. She died soon after their marriage. His second wife was the maternal granddaughter of Mughal emperor Jahangir. She died in Lahore.

One of his son died fighting against Sikh Army.

== Work ==
Syed Kahir ud Din wrote many books in Persian, his most prominent are the following:

- Tofa tul Qadaria
- Dewan Urabati
- Ifat ul qadri
- Risala guldasta
- Risala nooria
- Risala munsaja
