= Behlolpur =

Behlolpur is a town in Gujrat District in the Punjab province of Pakistan, 40 km from Gujrat city, on the bank of the river Chenab.

== Climate ==
Behlolpur has an extreme climate in summer. During the peak of summer, the daytime temperature shoots up to 45 °C, but the hot spells are relatively short due to the proximity of the Azad Kashmir Mountains. During the winter, the minimum temperature may fall below 2 °C. The average rainfall is 67 cm.

== See also ==
- Kurree
- Randhir Khokharan
- Mari Khokhran
- Tanda, Gujrat
