= Sunari Wala =

Punjabi village

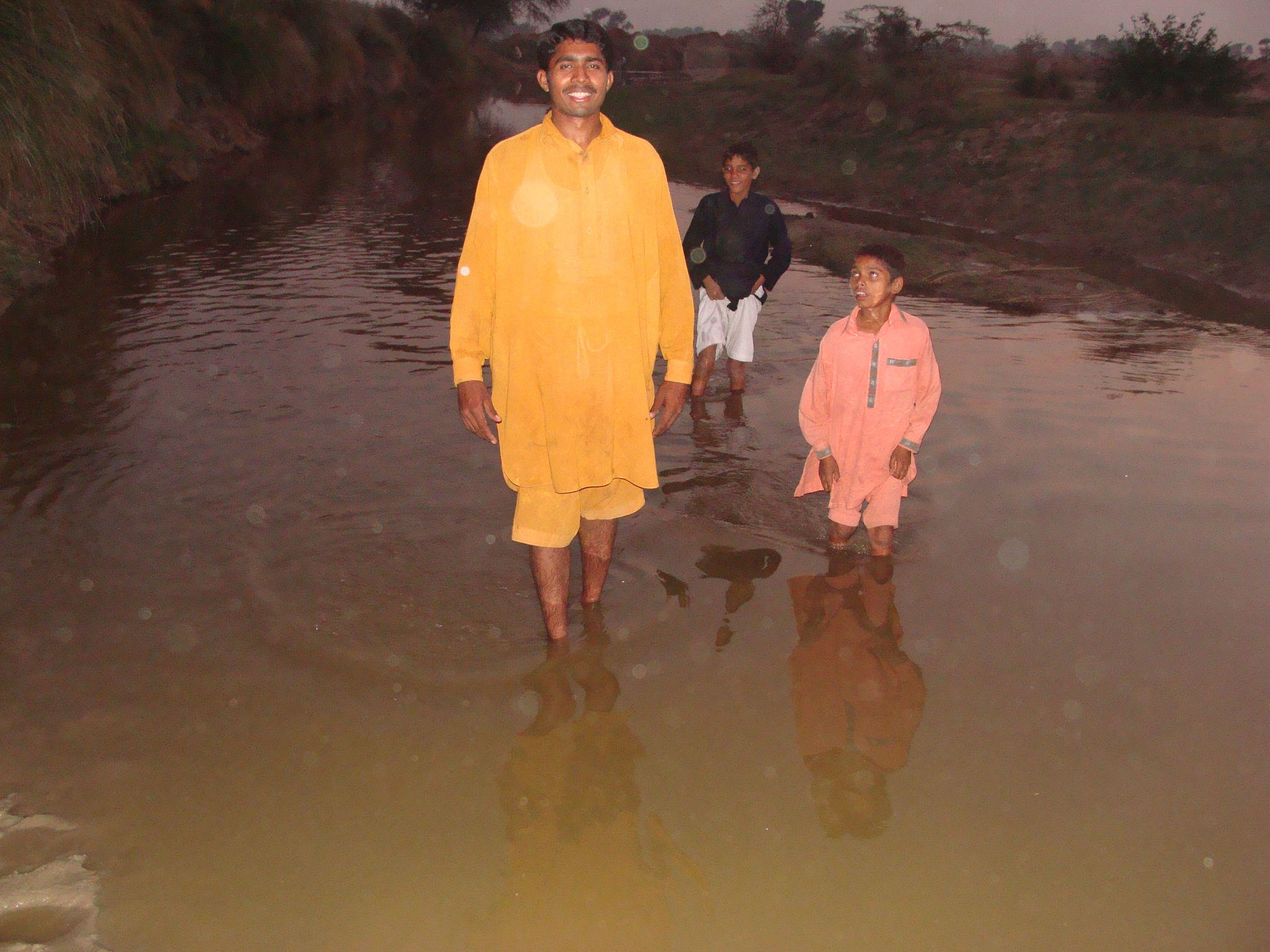
Sunari Wala

Sunari Wala is a village located southeast of Depalpur Tehsil, Okara District in the Lahore Division of Punjab, Pakistan. The River Beas flows nearby.

It is an agricultural village with a population of about 1000 people. A large number of the villagers do not own land for cultivation, but work as labourers on farms of landowners.

The village has no dispensary. It has a primary school for boys only, but there is no school for girls. Chak Shaam Din and Mustafabad are the neighbouring villages. Maize and potato are the major crops of Sunari Wala. The farmers of this village are not educated and use traditional methods for farming, cultivated two crops a year. The farmers also keep domestic animals like buffaloes and cows. The women of this village are also uneducated. They work in their houses as well as in the fields along with their kinsmen for long hours without any pay.
