= Chak 31/1 AL =

Village in Okara, Pakistan

Coordinates: 30°50′17″N 73°39′59″E

Chak 31/1 AL is a village situated near Renala Khurd in Okara district of Punjab province, Pakistan. It is located about 8 km from Shergarh town. The village dates back to the 1900s.
