= Vir Singh bibliography =

Indian Punjabi-language writer

This is a list of works by Indian Punjabi-language writer Bhai Vir Singh (1872–1957). This list includes his poetry, novels, translations, plays, and non-fiction.

== Fiction ==
=== Poetry ===
==== Epics ====
- Rana Surat Singh (ਰਾਣਾ ਸੂਰਤ ਸਿੰਘ [The Prince Beautiful], 1905)

==== Collections of Poems ====
- Dil Tarang (ਦਿਲ ਤਰੰਗ, [Heart Waves], 1920)
- Tarel Tupke (ਤਰੇਲ ਤੁਪਕੇ, [Dew Drops], 1921)
- Lehran de Haar (ਲਹਿਰਾੰ ਦੇ ਹਾਰ [Garlands of Excitement],1921)
- Matak Hulare (ਮਟਕ ਹੁਲਾਰੇ [Enticing Swaying], 1922)
- Bijliyan De Haar (ਬਿਜਲੀਆਂ ਦੇ ਹਾਰ [Garlands of Electricity], 1927)
- Preet Veena (ਪ੍ਰੀਤ ਵੀਣਾ [The Venna of Love], 1929)
- Kambdi Kalai (ਕੰਬਦੀ ਕਲਾਈ [The Trembling Wrist], 1933)
- Lehar Hulare (ਲਹਿਰ ਹੁਲਾਰੇ [Swaying Waves], 1946)
- Kant Maheli (ਕੰਤ ਮਹੇਲੀ [The Year of Trysting], 1950)
- Mere Saiyan Jeo! (ਮੇਰੇ ਸਾਂਈਆਂ ਜੀਓ! [O My Beloved],1953)
- Ilum te amal

=== Novels ===
- Sundari (ਸੁੰਦਰੀ [The Beautiful Woman],1898)
- Bijay Singh (ਬਿਜੇ ਸਿੰਘ, 1899)
- Satwant Kaur Part I (ਸਤਵੰਤ ਕੌਰ ਭਾਗ ਪਹਿਲਾ, 1900)
- Sat Aukhian Ratan (ਸੱਤ ਔਖੀਆਂ ਰਾਤਾਂ, 1919)
- Baba Naudh Singh (ਬਾਬਾ ਨੌਧ ਸਿੰਘ, 1907, 1921)
- Satwant Kaur Part II (ਸਤਵੰਤ ਕੌਰ ਭਾਗ ਦੂਜਾ, 1927)
- Rana Bhador (ਰਾਣਾ ਭਬੋਰ)

=== Translation ===
- Bharthari Hari Jeewan te Neeti Shatak (ਭਰਥੀ ਹਰੀ ਜੀਵਨ [The Prosporious Lifestyle of Bharathari], 1916)

=== Plays ===
- Raja Lakhdata Singh (ਰਾਜਾ ਲਖਦਾਤਾ ਸਿੰਘ, 1910)
- Nanan Parjhai (ਨਿਨਾਣ ਭਰਜਾਈ, 1951)

== Non-Fiction ==
=== Biographies ===
- Sri Kalghidhar Chamatkar (ਸ੍ਰੀ ਕਲਗੀਧਰ ਚਮਤਕਾਰ [The Genius of the King with the Plume], 1925)
- Puratan Janamsakhi (ਪੁਰਾਤਨ ਜਨਮ ਸਾਖੀ [The Traditional Birth Account], 1926)
- Sri Guru Nanak Chamatkar (ਸ੍ਰੀ ਗੁਰੂ ਨਾਨਕ ਚਮਤਕਾਰ [The Genius Sri Guru Nanak], 1928)
- Bhai Jhanda Jio ([ਭਾਈ ਝੰਡਾ ਜੀਓ], 1933)
- Bhai Bhumia & Kaljug di Sakhi (ਭਾਈ ਭੂਮੀਆਂ ਅਤੇ ਕਲਿਜੁਗ ਦੀ ਸਾਖੀ, 1936)
- Sant Gatha (2 Volumes) (ਸੰਤ ਗਾਥਾ [Tales of Various Saints], 1938)
- Sri Asht Guru Chamatkar Vol.-I & II (ਸ੍ਰੀ ਅਸ਼ਟ ਗੁਰ ਚਮਤਕਾਰ ਭਾਗ - ੧ ਤੇ ੨, 1952)
- Gursikh Warhi (ਗੁਰਸਿੱਖ ਵਾੜੀ [The Efflorescence of a Sikh of the Guru], 1951)
- Gur Balam Sakhian Guru Nanak Dev Ji (ਸ੍ਰੀ ਗੁਰੂ ਨਾਨਕ ਦੇਵ ਜੀ ਦੀਆਂ ਗੁਰ ਬਾਲਮ ਸਾਖੀਆਂ, 1955)
- Gur Balam Sakhian Guru Gobind Singh Ji (ਸ੍ਰੀ ਗੁਰੂ ਗੋਬਿੰਦ ਸਿੰਘ ਜੀ ਦੀਆਂ ਗੁਰ ਬਾਲਮ ਸਾਖੀਆਂ, 1955)

=== Learned Works and Interpretations ===
- Sikhan di Bhagat Mala (ਸਿਖਾਂ ਦੀ ਭਗਤ ਮਾਲਾ, 1912)
- Prachin Panth Prakash (ਪ੍ਰਾਚੀਨ ਪੰਥ ਪ੍ਰਕਾਸ਼ [Enlightenment Guide of the Old Order], 1914)
- Ganj Namah Steek (ਗੰਜ ਨਾਮਹ ਸਟੀਕ, 1914)
- Sri Guru Granth Kosh (ਸ੍ਰੀ ਗੁਰੂ ਗ੍ਰੰਥ ਕੋਸ਼ [Sri Guru Granth Dictionary], 1927)
- Sri Gur Partap Suraj Granth (ਸ੍ਰੀ ਗੁਰਪ੍ਰਤਾਪ ਸੂਰਜ ਗਰੰਥ ਸਟਿੱਪਣ, 1927–1935)
- Devi Poojan Partal (ਦੇਵੀ ਪੂਜਨ ਪੜਤਾਲ (A Scrutiny into the Worship of Deities, 1932)
- Panj Granthi Steek (ਪੰਜ ਗ੍ਰੰਥੀ ਸਟੀਕ, 1940)
- Kabit Bhai Gurdas (ਕਬਿੱਤ ਭਾਈ ਗੁਰਦਾਸ, 1940)
- Varan Bhai Gurdas (ਵਾਰਾਂ ਭਾਈ ਗੁਰਦਾਸ [Ballads of Bhai Gurdas)
- Ban Yudh (ਬਨ ਜੁੱਧ)
- Sakhi Pothi (ਸਾਖੀ ਪੋਥੀ [The Book of Accounts], 1950)

=== Posthumous ===
- Gurmat Nam (ਗੁਰਮਤਿ ਨਾਮੁ [The Lord's Name in Sikhism], 1958)
- Santhya Sri Guru Granth Sahib Vol.- I (ਸੰਥਆ ਸ੍ਰੀ ਗੁਰੂ ਗ੍ਰੰਥ ਸਾਹਿਬ ਪੋਥੀ ਪਹਿਲੀ, 1958)
- Santhya Sri Guru Granth Sahib Vol.- II (ਸੰਥਆ ਸ੍ਰੀ ਗੁਰੂ ਗ੍ਰੰਥ ਸਾਹਿਬ ਪੋਥੀ ਦੂਜੀ, 1958)
- Santhya Sri Guru Granth Sahib Vol.- III (ਸੰਥਆ ਸ੍ਰੀ ਗੁਰੂ ਗ੍ਰੰਥ ਸਾਹਿਬ ਪੋਥੀ ਤੀਜੀ, 1959)
- Santhya Sri Guru Granth Sahib Vol.- IV (ਸੰਥਆ ਸ੍ਰੀ ਗੁਰੂ ਗ੍ਰੰਥ ਸਾਹਿਬ ਪੋਥੀ ਚੌਥੀ, 1960)
- Santhya Sri Guru Granth Sahib Vol.- V (ਸੰਥਆ ਸ੍ਰੀ ਗੁਰੂ ਗ੍ਰੰਥ ਸਾਹਿਬ ਪੋਥੀ ਪੰਜਵੀਂ, 1961)
- Santhya Sri Guru Granth Sahib Vol.- VI (ਸੰਥਆ ਸ੍ਰੀ ਗੁਰੂ ਗ੍ਰੰਥ ਸਾਹਿਬ ਪੋਥੀ ਛੇਵੀਂ, 1962)
- Santhya Sri Guru Granth Sahib Vol.- VII (ਸੰਥਆ ਸ੍ਰੀ ਗੁਰੂ ਗ੍ਰੰਥ ਸਾਹਿਬ ਪੋਥੀ ਸੱਤਵੀਂ, 1962)
- Sri Guru Gobind Singh Ji De Pavittar Jeevan Vichon Kujh Chamatkar (1967)
- Amar Lekh (3 Volumes) (ਅਮਰ ਲੇਖ, 1967)
- Awaz Aai (ਆਵਾਜ਼ ਆਈ [Along Came the Sound], 1971)
- Sikan Sadhran (ਸਿੱਕਾਂ ਸੱਧਰਾਂ [Wealth of Wishes], 1973)
- Sahitak Kaliyan (ਸਾਹਿਤਕ ਕਲੀਆਂ, 1973)
- Sant Bimla Singh (ਸੰਤ ਬਿਮਲਾ ਸਿੰਘ, 1974)
- Pyaar Athru (ਪਿਆਰ ਅੱਥਰੂ [Tears of Love], 1980)
- Sri Asht Guru Chamatkar Vol.-III (ਸ੍ਰੀ ਅਸ਼ਟ ਗੁਰ ਚਮਤਕਾਰ ਭਾਗ - ੩, 1981)
- Sukhmani Steek (ਸੁਖਮਨੀ ਸਟੀਕ, 1982)
- Bhai Vir Singh Di Chonvin Kavita (ਭਾਈ ਵੀਰ ਸਿੰਘ ਦੀ ਚੋਣਵੀਂ ਕਵਿਤਾ, 1984)
- Vir Patravli (Letters, 1990)
- Jeevan Kani (ਜੀਵਨ ਕਣੀ [The Raindrop of Life], 1993)
- Bir Darshan (ਬੀਰ ਦਰਸ਼ਨ [Glimpse of Braveness], 1993)
- Bhai Mardana (ਭਾਈ ਮਰਦਾਨਾ, 1998)
- Gurpurb Gulzar (ਗੁਰਪੁਰਬ ਗੁਲਜ਼ਾਰ, 1998)
- Pyarey de Pyara (ਪਿਆਰੇ ਦਾ ਪਿਆਰਾ [The Dearest Beloved], 1999)

-

- Aarshi Shooh (ਅਰਸ਼ੀ ਛੁਹ)
- Diwan Bhai Vir Singh (ਦੀਵਾਨ ਭਾਈ ਵੀਰ ਸਿੰਘ)
- Gurmukh Sikhya (ਗੁਰਮੁਖ ਸਿੱਖਿਆ [The Teachings of Sikhism])
- Jaap Sahib Steek (ਜਾਪੁ ਸਾਹਿਬ ਸਟੀਕ)
- Japu Ji Steek (ਜਾਪੁ ਸਾਹਿਬ ਸਟੀਕ)
- Khara Sauda (ਖ਼ਰਾ ਸੌਦਾ)
- Navin Paneeri (Guru Nanak Dev) (3 Parts)
- Navin Paneeri (Guru Gobind Singh)
- Navin Paneeri (Guru Angad Dev)
- Pritam Ji (ਪ੍ਰੀਤਮ ਜੀ [Beloved Fellow])
- Pyar Parvane (ਪਿਆਰ ਪਰਵਾਨੇ)
- Vir Suneherre (ਵੀਰ ਸੁਨੇਹੜੇ)
