= Muhammad Yar Chishti =

Muhammad Yar Chishti محمد يار چشتي
- Interactive map of Muhammad Yar Chishti
- Coordinates: 30.453687°N 73.732821°E
- Country: Pakistan
- Province: Punjab

Government
  - Numberdar: Mansha Chishti

Area
  - Total: 1 km^{2} (0.39 sq mi)

Population (2009)
  - Total: 250
  - Density: 250/km^{2} (650/sq mi)
- Time zone: UTC+5 (PST)
- Calling code: 044

Muhammad Yar Chishti (Urdu: محمد يار چشتي) is a village in Tehsil Depalpur, District Okara, Pakistan. It is right on the outskirts of Haveli Lakha, a small city. It produces a wide variety of agricultural products, including potatoes, sugar canes, cotton, wheat, corn, rice, lentils etc. Some of the houses are made of adobe and some are of bricks. It has a mosque.

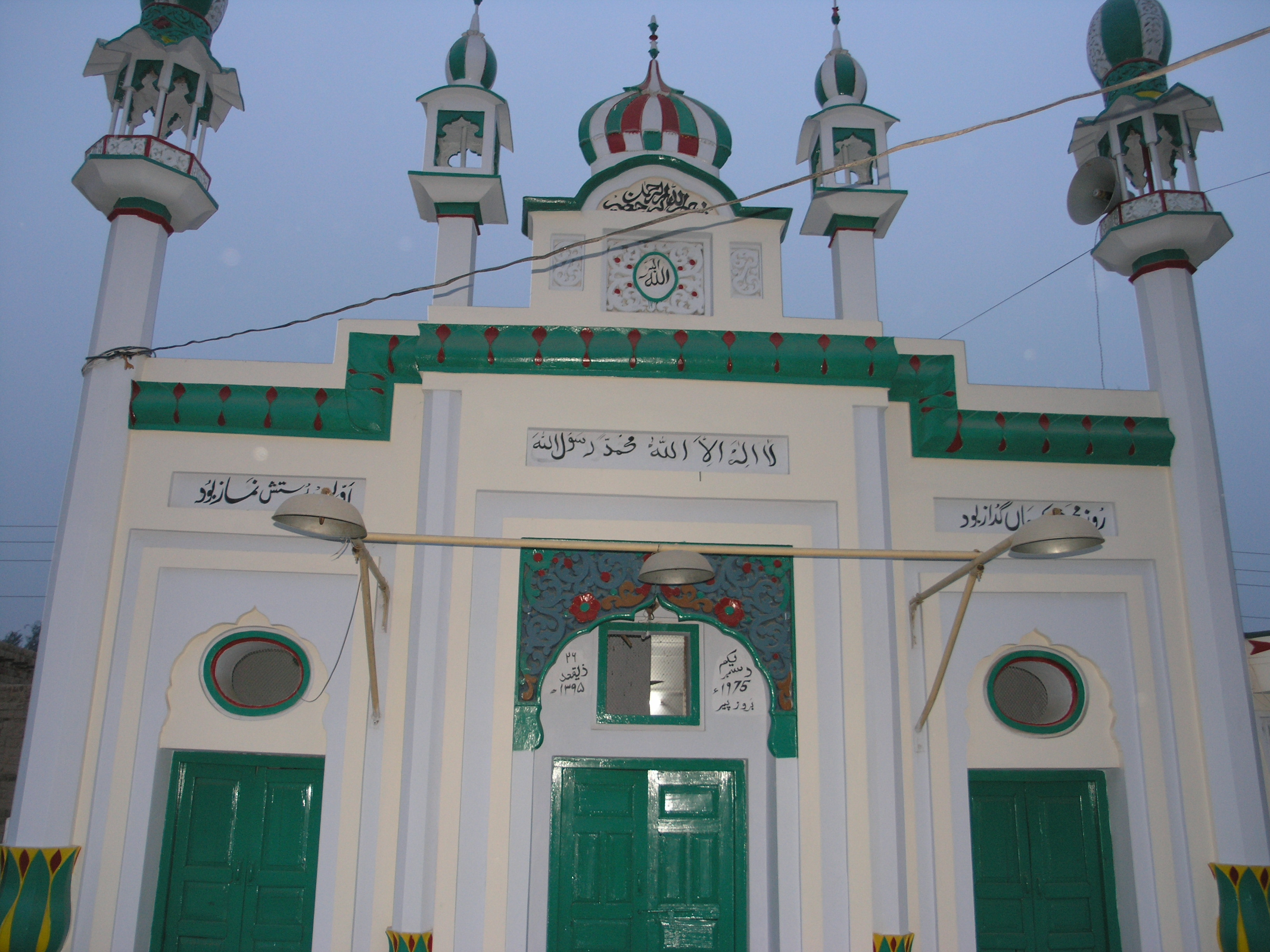
Mosque in Muhammad Yar Chishti

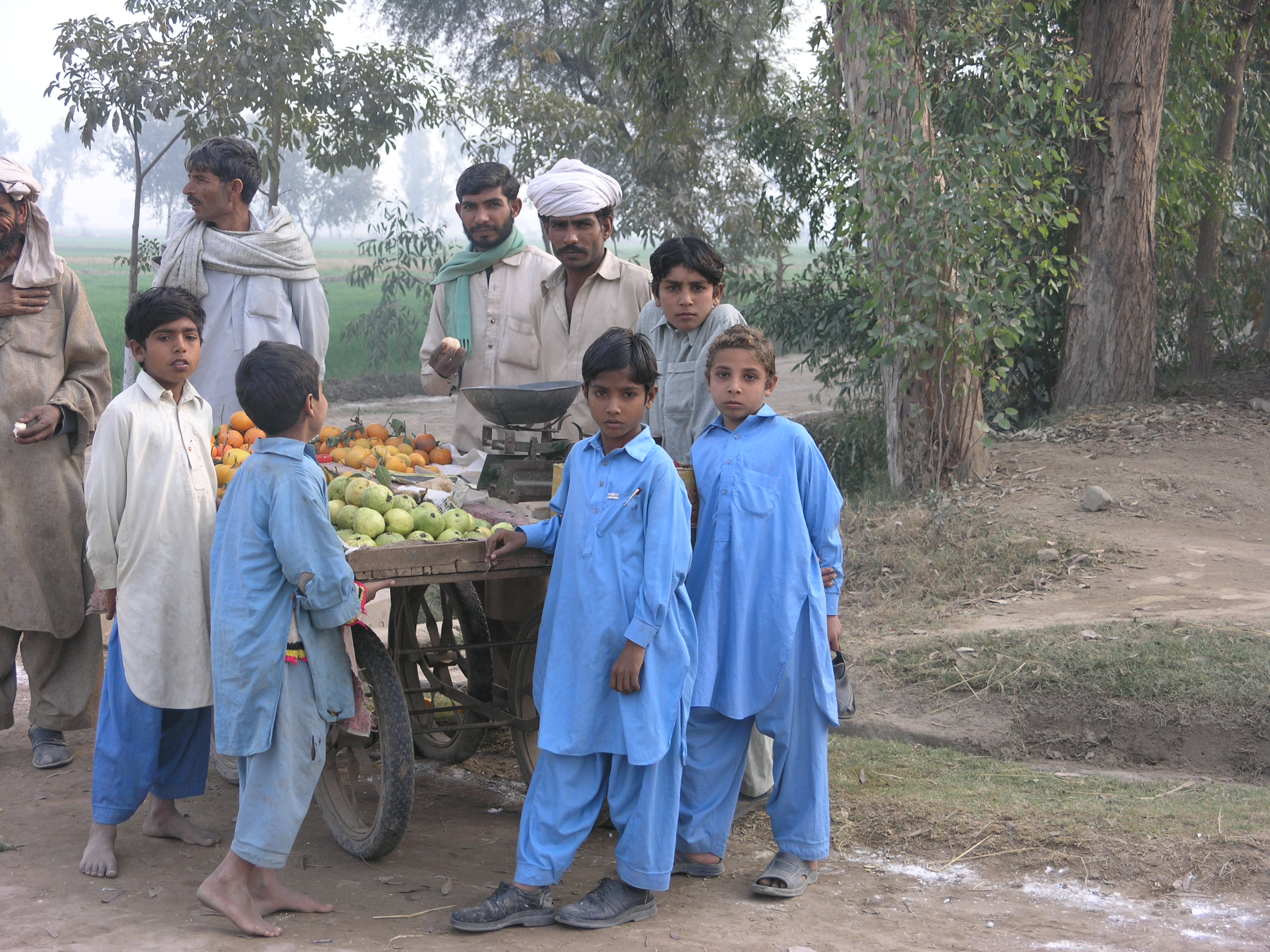
Street vendor selling guavas and oranges
