= Awan Kalan =

Coordinates: 30°44′0″N 73°47′0″E

- Town and union council
- Interactive map of Awan Kalan
- Country: Pakistan
- Region: Okara District
- District: Okara District
- Time zone: UTC+5 (PST)

Awan Kalan is a town and union council of Depalpur Tehsil in the Okara District of Punjab Province, Pakistan. The town is located at 30°43'60N 73°46'60E and is part of the National Assembly constituency NA-146.

== See also ==
- Awans of Pakistan
