= Daud Bandagi Kirmani =

Shaikh Daud Bandagi Kirmani
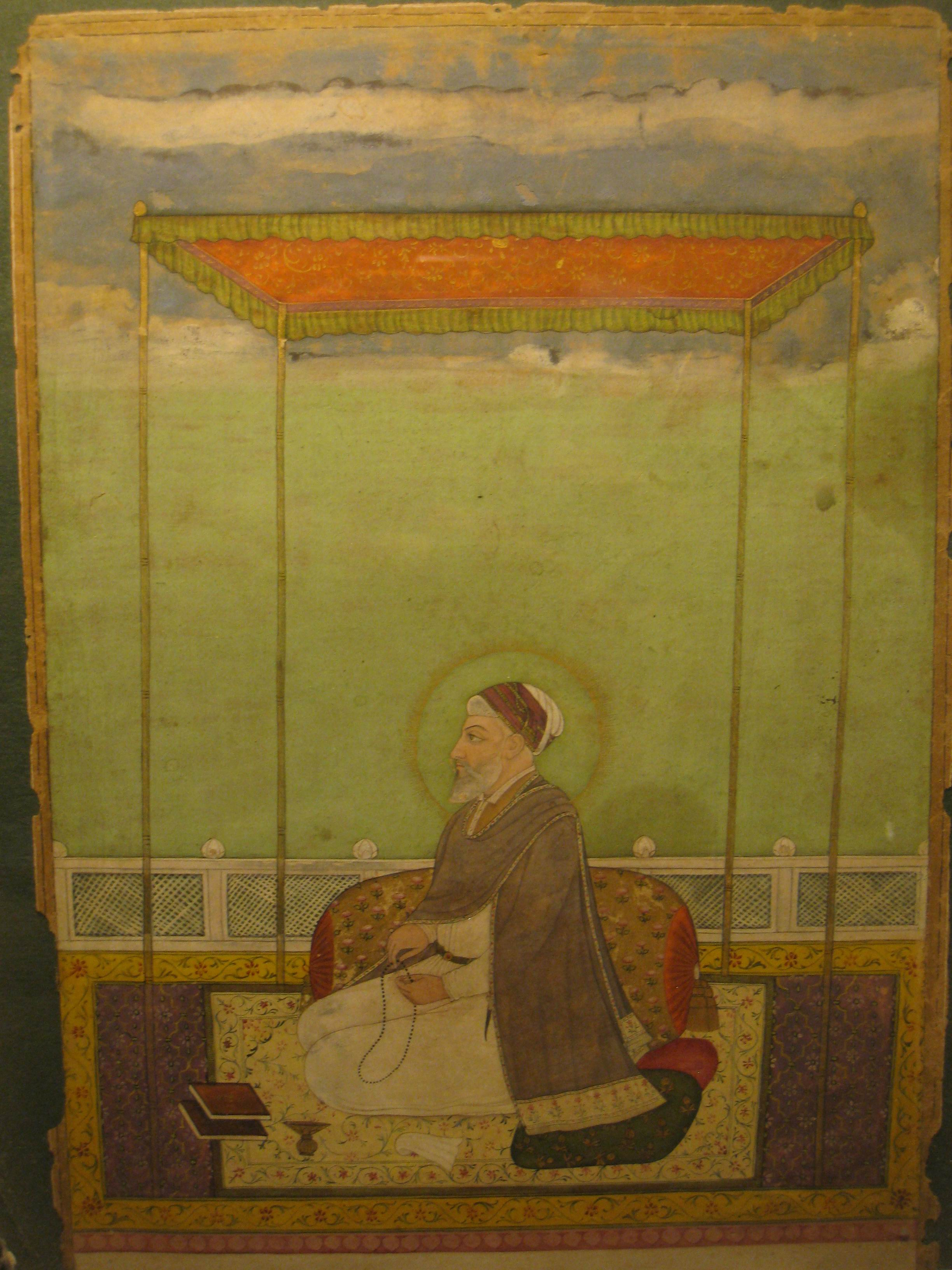
- Early 17th-century miniature of Daud Bandagi Kirmani

Personal life
- Born: c. 1513
- Died: 1575 Shergarh, Okara District, Punjab, Pakistan
- Resting place: Tomb at Shergarh, Okara District, Punjab, Pakistan
- Era: 16th century

Religious life
- Religion: Islam
- Denomination: Sunni
- Order: Qadiriyya

Syed Muhammad Ibrahim bin Syed Fatehullah Kirmani 1513-1575C.E. (AH 919–982), more popularly known as Shaikh Daud Bandagi Kirmani was a 16th-century saint of the Qadiri order.

== His mausoleum ==
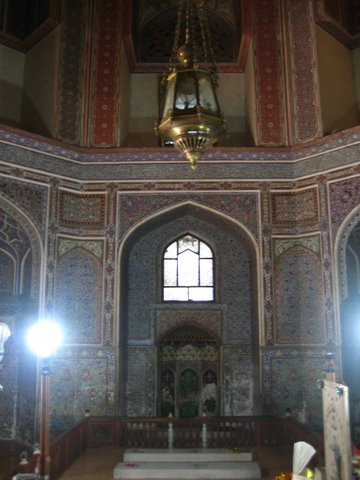
Shrine of Daud Bandagi Kirmani

His mausoleum in Shergarh, Punjab, was completed in 1580 CE. The interior of the octagonal shrine is decorated with intricate floral and geometric frescoes. On each of the eight interior lower alcoves are Persian couplets by Shah Abul Muali extolling Daud. The grave is in an enclosure in the center of the shrine with the graves of six of his lineal descendants on either side. The exterior of the shrine has panels of intricate stucco tracery on all sides. The shrine, is under the care of the Auqaf Department and the Archeology Department of the Government of Punjab, Pakistan, which conducted extensive restoration work in the 1980s, mainly on the preservation of the frescoes.
