= Kurree =

- Location within Pakistan
- Coordinates: 32°41′52″N 74°27′12″E
- Country: Pakistan
- Province: Punjab
- District: Gujrat
- Elevation: 220 m (720 ft)
- Time zone: UTC+5 (PST)

Kurree is a large village of Gujrat District in the Punjab province of Pakistan. It is located at 32°31'10N 74°12'55E with an altitude of 220 metres (725 feet) and is about 45 km north east of Gujrat city and about 25 km from the city of Sialkot.

== See also ==
- Sialkot
- Gakhars
- Tanda, Gujrat
- Behlol Pur, Gujrat
