= Bhoman Shah =

Coordinates: 30°32′0″N 73°39′0″E

- Town and union council
- Interactive map of Bhoman Shah
- Country: Pakistan
- Region: Okara District
- District: Okara District
- Time zone: UTC+5 (PST)
- Website: https://bhomanshah.com

Bhoman Shah is a town and union council of Depalpur Tehsil in the Okara District of Pakistan's Punjab province. (Note: There are many spelling variations for the settlement's name, such as 'Bhuman', 'Bhoman', 'Bhumman', 'Bhomman', 'Boman', or 'Bomman'.) It is located at 30°31'60N 73°39'0E.
