= Haveli Lakha =

Haveli Lakha حویلی لكهّا
- City
- Location within Punjab, Pakistan Location within Pakistan
- Coordinates: 30.448633°N 73.697865°E
- Country: Pakistan
- Province: Punjab

Government
  - Type: Municipal Committee
  - Chairman: Vacant
  - Vice Chairman: Vacant

Area
  - City: 53 km^{2} (20 sq mi)

Population (2023 census)
  - City: 122,389
  - Rank: 99th in Pakistan (2023)
  - Density: 2,300/km^{2} (6,000/sq mi)
- Time zone: UTC+5 (PST)
- Calling code: 044
- Number of towns: 1
- Number of Union councils: 06

Haveli Lakha (Punjabi,Urdu: حویلی لكهّا) is a city in Depalpur Tehsil of Okara District in the Punjab province of Pakistan. It is located around 158 km (98.4 miles) south west of the provincial capital Lahore.

Haveli Lakha is part of Depalpur Tehsil and is administratively subdivided into three Union councils.

== Demographics ==
Population

Historical population

Year	Pop.	±% p.a.
1951	8,480	—
1961	10,624	+2.28%
1972	18,276	+5.06%
1981	27,633	+4.70%

Year	Pop.	±% p.a.
1998	52,207	+3.81%
2017	78,257	+2.15%
2023	122,389	+7.74%

According to the 2023 census, Haveli Lakha had a population of 122,389.

Languages

Languages of Haveli Lakha MC (2023 Census)
1. Punjabi (96.2%)
2. Urdu (2.60%)
3. Others (1.20%)

== See also ==
- Muhammad Yar Chishti
