= Habibabad =

- Town
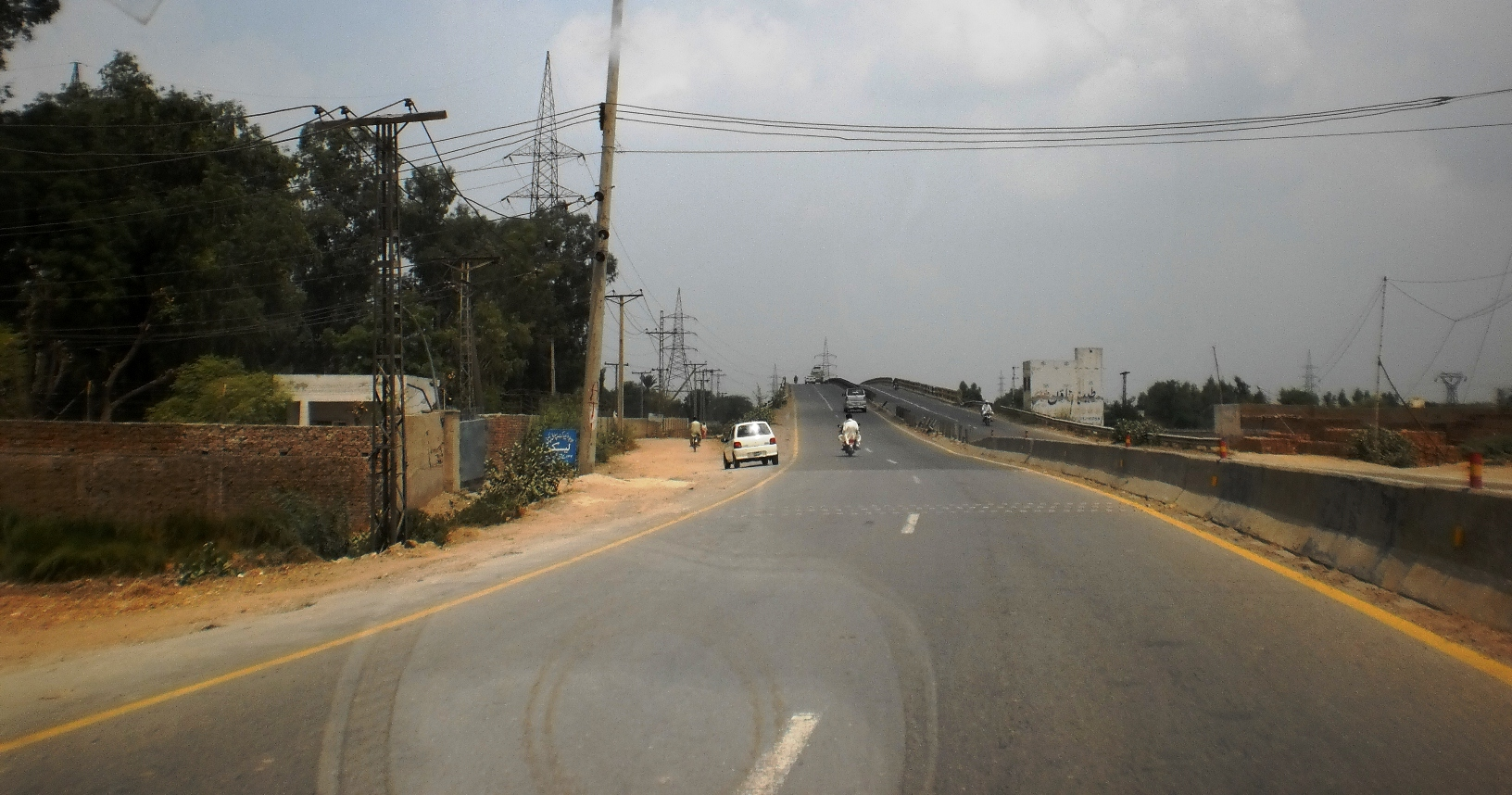

- Location within Pakistan
- Coordinates: 30°56′56″N 73°44′36″E
- Country: Pakistan
- Province: Punjab
- District: Kasur
- Time zone: UTC+5 (PST)

Habibabad (Urdu: حبِيب آباد), (previously, Wan Radha Ram) is a town part of Pattoki Tehsil in the Kasur District in the Province of Punjab, Pakistan.

== Demographics ==
The population of the village, according to 2017 census was 2,592.

== Location ==
It lies on the N-5 about 96 kilometres (60 mi) away from Lahore the capital of Punjab Province.

Historical Background

The Great British Empire, in the year 1858, granted a 1,600-acre estate near Pattoki to Malik Abdul Rahim, the Raees of Sanda Kalan and Daroga of Lahore, in recognition of his having constructed an inn and encampment for the Imperial Army; upon this land he laid the foundation of the town of Umarabad, named in honor of his father, Malik Umar Din, the former in-charge of Lahore Fort and a distinguished landowner; and the settlement, now comprising markets and a railway station, is famously known as Habibabad, after a member of this same family donated land for the railway station, which was thereafter named Habibabad Railway Station in their honor

Neighborhoods include Bypass, Shuja Market, Shergarh Bazar, Sanda Bazar, Ali Haider Sanda Market, Hussain Feroze Bazaar and Rail Bazar. Much of the town is seeing new construction, as in Faisal Town, Ashrafia Town, and the Lalapak housing scheme. The main areas of Habibabad are Nei Mandi, Purani Mandi, Lalazar Colony, Javed Nagar, Umer Abad, Malik Wali Hussain Sanda Town and Karmabad.
