= Behlolpur (Okara) =

Coordinates: 30°42′0″N 73°49′0″E

بہلول پُور
- Town
- Behlolpur
- Interactive map of بہلول پُور
- Country: Pakistan
- Region: Okara District
- District: Okara District
- Time zone: UTC+5 (PST)

Behlolpur (Urdu: بہلول پُور), is a town of Depalpur Tehsil in the Okara District of Punjab Province, Pakistan. The town is located at 30°42'0N 73°49'0E at an altitude of 174 metres (574 feet). It is part of the NA-145 constituency of the National Assembly.
