= Hujra Shah Muqeem =

City in Punjab, Pakistan

Hujra Shah Muqeem حُجره شاه مُقِيم
- City
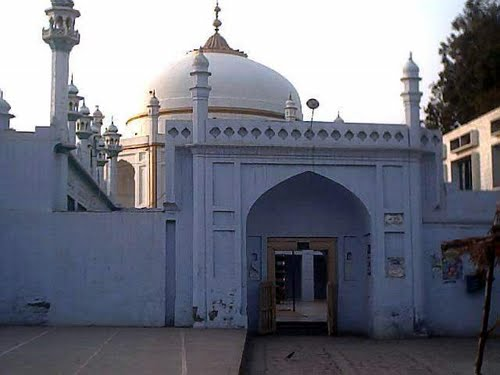

- Location within Punjab, Pakistan Location within Pakistan
- Coordinates: 30°44′22″N 73°49′22″E
- Country: Pakistan
- Province: Punjab
- Division: Sahiwal
- District: Okara

Government
  - Type: Municipal Committee

Population (2023)
  - City: 95,921
  - Rank: 135th in Pakistan

Hujra Shah Muqeem (Urdu: حُجره شاه مُقِيم), is a city in Depalpur Tehsil of Okara District in the Punjab province of Pakistan. Pul Dhool is the largest town in this city. Hujra Shah Muqeem is near Depalpur, and is administratively subdivided into 3 Union Councils. Hujra Shah Muqeem is the site of a Sufi shrine and an historic gurudwara.

== Demographics ==
Population

Historical population
Year	Pop.	±% p.a.
1972	16,629	—
1981	24,012	+4.17%
1998	47,415	+4.08%
2017	76,629	+2.56%
2023	95,921	+3.81%

According to the 2023 census, Hujra Shah Muqeem city has a population of 95,921.

== Famous persons ==
=== Preachers ===
Muslim saints who have come to preach in this area include:

- Bahawal Sher Qalander, born Syed Bahauddin Gilani (see below)
- Sayed Shah Noor Muhammad
- Shah Muhammad Muqeem
- Asad Bilal

=== Bahawal Sher Qalander ===
Born Syed Bahauddin Gilani, but popularly known as Bahawal Sher Qalander. He emigrated from Gilan, Iraq to the Indian subcontinent with his father Syed Mehmood and his paternal aunt. Qalander preached the message of the Qadri order for more than a decade, and lived longest among the Qadiriyya saints. According to Mufti Ghulam Sarwar, he lived for 240 years, dying on 18 Shawwal, AH 973 (8 May 1566 AD). He is buried in Hujra Shah Muqeem.

His father died in Budaun, Uttar Pradesh, India. His four sons Syed Ialal Ud Din Gillani (Masoom Pak), Shah Noor Muhammad, Shah Muhammad, and Shah Khalil Muhammad are buried in Hujra Shah Muqeem. The city is named after his grandson, Syed Muhkimuddin Shah Muqeem.

== Transport and facilities ==
Transport services are available via local buses and vans operating from the local bus station to nearby cities (Okara, Depalpur). Private taxis also operate in the city. Transport to adjoining villages and settlements is provided by rickshaws which operate from the stands, from Hujra Mor to Town Center & Jhujh Khurd Rikshaw Stop to Shamsabad & Dhuliana.

There are separate government-run high schools for boys and girls in the city. The city is home to a government degree college for women, in addition to numerous private institutions

Health care services are provided by government-run hospitals and basic health care units.
