= Tanda, Gujrat =

Tanda ٹانڈا
- Town
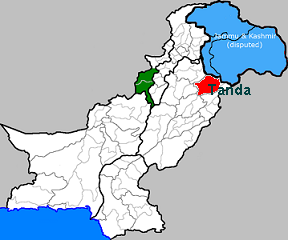
- Pakistan - Tanda map
- Interactive map of Tanda
- Coordinates: 32.702°N 74.368°E
- Country: Pakistan
- Province: Punjab
- District: Gujrat

Area
  - Total: 5 km^{2} (1.9 sq mi)

Population
  - Total: 10,000
- Time zone: UTC+5 (PST)
- Calling code: 053

Tanda is a town in Gujrat District of the Punjab province of Pakistan. It is a union council, an administrative subdivision of Gujrat Tehsil.

== History ==
The word Tanda means "Place of stay" in the sanskrit language. Before the Partition of India in 1947 the town had a large population of Sikhs belonging to the Labana clans. after partition they migrated to India. 70% Gujjar tribes from Jammu and Kashmir migrated into the Tanda area at the same time.

Labanas established a community school in Tanda for the free education of their community, for this cause their tribe decided that no women will wear jewelry and all held should be deposited for the establishment of school. This school with boarding house very quickly established its repo and even before partition considered one of the best schools in the zone.

== Geography ==
Tanda is located at 32.702°N 74.368°E. Tanda is the name of a small locality, which is a well-known small city of Gujrat. A village located 5 km near Tanda named Barila Sharif. That village is famous for saint and graves; there was a famous grave of Qanbeet that is 70 yards long. All over the Punjab people visited that place.

== Climate ==
The city has moderate climate. During the peak of summer, the daytime temperature shoots up to 45 °C, but the hot spells are relatively short due to the proximity of the Azad Kashmir Mountains. During the winter, the minimum temperature may fall below 2 °C. The average rainfall is 67 cm.

== Demography ==
Most people in the town speak Punjabi. Urdu and English are also spoken.

== See also ==
- Marala Headworks
- Jalalpur Jattan
- Behlol Pur, Gujrat
- Gujrat City
- Lakhanwal
