= Basirpur =

Pakistani town

بصیر پور
- City
- Basirpur
- Interactive map of بصیر پور
- Country: Pakistan
- Province: Punjab

Population (2023 census)
  - Total: 65,541
- Time zone: UTC+5 (PKT)
- Postal code: 56010
- Calling code: 044
- Number of towns: 1
- Number of Union councils: 06

Basirpur (Punjabi,Urdu: بصيرپور) is a town in Depalpur Tehsil of Okara District in the Punjab province of Pakistan. It is located around 151 km (94 miles) south west of Lahore.

Basirpur is part of Depalpur Tehsil and is administratively subdivided into three Union councils.

== Demographics ==
The population of the city in 1972 was 15,872. According to the 2023 Census of Pakistan, the population has risen to 65,541.

Census	Population
1972	15,872
1981	24,032
1998	36,628
2017	48,307
2023	65,541
