= Dipalpur =

Dipalpur دیپال پور دِيپالپُور
- City
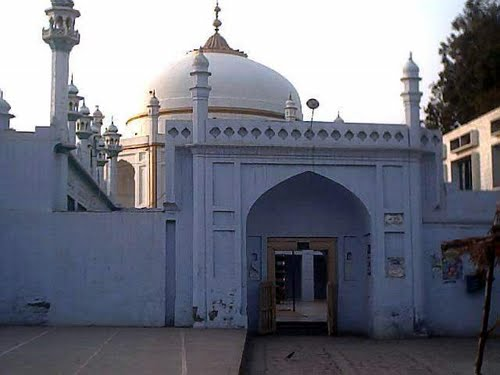
- The shrine of Hujra Shah in Depalpur City

- Location within Punjab, Pakistan Location within Pakistan
- Coordinates: 30°40′15″N 73°39′12″E
- Country: Pakistan
- Province: Punjab
- District: Okara
- Tehsil: Dipalpur

Government
  - Type: Municipal Committee
  - Chief Officer: Vacant
  - Municipal Officer: Vacant
- Elevation: 167 m (548 ft)

Population (2023)
  - City: 122,759
  - Rank: 98th in Pakistan (2023)
- Time zone: UTC+5 (PST)
- Calling code: 044
- Number of towns: 10+
- Number of Union councils: 3

Dipalpur (Urdu: دِيپالپُور), also spelt Depalpur, is a city in the Okara District of Pakistani province of Punjab that served as headquarters of Depalpur Tehsil. It is situated 150 kilometres from the province capital Lahore on a bank of the river Ravi. It is located west of Kasur District.

== History ==
Depalpur has a long and ancient history. Its foundation is traditionally attributed to a ruler named Raja Deva Pala (also rendered Depa Chand or Dipa Chand in various local traditions), though his exact date is unknown and predates reliable written record. A competing local tradition instead credits a Khatri named Bija Chand as founder, with the settlement originally called Sripur after his son Sri Chand. The fortified town is built on an old Kushan-era site (c. 40–172 AD), and coin finds indicate occupation as early as the Indo-Scythian period; Cunningham tentatively identified it with the "Daidala" mentioned by Ptolemy. The fortifications themselves cannot be precisely dated, but are known to predate Timur's invasion in 1398 AD. No accounts of Dipalpur survive from the period between Alexander and Mahmud Ghaznavi. According to the 1935 District Gazetteer, the modern name Depalpur/Dipalpur derives from this founder's name.

=== Islamic era ===
==== Delhi Sultanate ====
However, in older times, Dipalpur fell on the way to Delhi and, as such, was considered to be a place where an invader could be engaged. Dipalpur, therefore, was one of the 3 lines of defense; the other two begin Uch Sharif, Samana, and Hansi. Ain-i-Akbari reveals that the militia force at Dipalpur, during the reign of Abul Fazal, consisted of 5,210 mounted Horsemen and 53,300 infantry. In the 14th Century, Firuz Shah Tughlaq regularly visited this place. It is also believed that he built a large mosque outside the city, which no longer remains.

==== Mongol invasions ====
The Mongols invaded this part of the country repeatedly, and they were checked at Dipalpur by Ghiyas-ud-Din Balban and his son Muhammad Khan, during their last invasion of Punjab in 1285 AD. Pir Muhammad Khan Mangol (also called Samar Khan) was defeated at Dipalpur, but during the pursuit of the retreating Mongols, Muhammad Khan was killed. It is believed that Shahzada Muhammad Khan is laid to rest in a small tomb to the west of the Badshahi Mosque. Confirmation from any authentic sources is, however, not available.

At the time of Timur’s invasion, Depalpur was second to Multan in size and importance. The town, it is believed, may have been deserted due to Timur’s invasion and drying up of the old Beas River.

==== Mughal Empire ====
In the Baburnama, Babur the first Mughal Emperor wrote:

I defeated Pahar Khan and took Lahore and Dipalpur.

referring to his conquest in 1524.

The Mughal Emperor Akbar, along with his son Saleem (Jahangir), along with their royal entourage, stayed in Dipalpur when he came to pay homage to Fariduddin Ganjshakar in 1578. Akbar named the corridor Bari Doab by combining the syllables of the names of the two rivers, the Beas River and Ravi River, that bounded the area.

==== Sufism ====
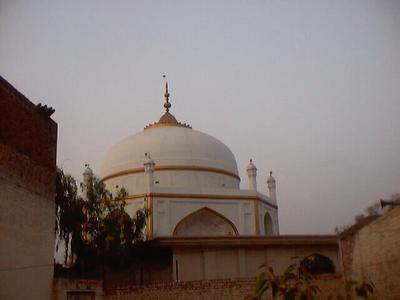
Hujra Shah Muqeem

Many Muslim saints have come to preach in this area. Bahawal Haq, commonly known as Bahawal Sher Qalandar, came from Baghdad and settled in the village of Patharwall near Dipalpur. The saint constructed a hujra (small living room) and a mosque outside the village. His grandson Shah Muqeem continued his mission. The village came to be known as Hujra Shah Muqeem. This is the place mentioned in the famous Punjabi love story Mirza Sahiban, where Jati Sahiban came here are pray, although there is no historical evidence to that. A Muslim saint named Saayin Abdul Razaq stayed in Dipalpur, and later on, he started his volunteer activity for local people. And after his death, he was buried in the city. Now, his death place is known as Razaqia Darbar.

=== Notable Historical Visits to Dipalpur (11th–19th Century) ===
Several historical figures are recorded or traditionally believed to have visited Dipalpur due to its strategic importance as a military and administrative center. These visits highlight Dipalpur's historical significance, drawing rulers, saints, and conquerors who aimed to strengthen their power, establish governance, or impose their beliefs through force.

Historical Figure	Title/Position	Date/Period of Visit	Context of Visit
Sultan Mahmud Ghaznavi	Sultan of the Ghaznavid Empire	Early 11th century (c. 1005)	Known for his ruthless raids and desecration of Hindu temples, Mahmud passed through Dipalpur during his campaigns, marked by fierce intolerance toward local religions and cultures.
Baba Fariduddin Ganjshakar	Sufi Saint	13th century	Preached Sufism in the area, shaping Dipalpur’s spiritual landscape.
Qutb-ud-din Aibak	Sultan of Delhi Sultanate	Early 13th century	Established a fort in Dipalpur to defend against Mongol invasions.
Sultan Jalal-ud-din Khilji	Sultan of Delhi Sultanate	1290s	Visited to strengthen Dipalpur's defenses on the northwest frontier.
Ghiyas-ud-din Tughlaq	Sultan of Delhi Sultanate	1320s	Made Dipalpur a military and administrative hub for the region, establishing a lasting spiritual legacy.
Feroz Shah Tughlaq	Sultan of Delhi Sultanate	Mid-14th century	Promoted agriculture by building canals in the region.
Timur (Tamerlane)	Conqueror, founder of Timurid Empire	1398	Infamous for his brutality and mass slaughter, Timur passed through Dipalpur during his bloody invasion of the Indian subcontinent. His campaign was marked by horrific massacres and widespread destruction, as he established himself as a murderous tyrant feared across the region.
Guru Nanak Dev	Founder of Sikhism	Early 16th century (c. 1505)	Guru Nanak visited Dipalpur as part of his journeys across the Indian subcontinent to spread his teachings on compassion, unity, and tolerance. During his stay, he engaged with the local community, sharing spiritual wisdom and advocating for equality. Gurdwara Sri Chota Nanakiana Sahib is the site where he is said to have rested beneath a dead pipal tree, which miraculously came back to life and still stands today. During his stay, he is also believed to have cured a leper named Nuri (Nauranga), an act that reinforced his reputation for kindness and healing; Nuri's grave lies just behind the gurdwara.
Babur	Founder of the Mughal Empire	1520s	Known for his oppressive rule and harsh policies toward local populations, Babur visited Dipalpur during his campaign to conquer Northern India, using forceful means to secure control.
Sher Shah Suri	Sultan of Delhi Sultanate	Mid-16th century	Strengthened the Grand Trunk Road near Dipalpur for better connectivity.
Mughal Emperor Akbar	Emperor of the Mughal Empire	Late 16th century	Implemented administrative reforms in the region, enhancing governance.
Maharaja Ranjit Singh	Ruler of the Sikh Empire	Early 19th century	Annexed Dipalpur to the Sikh Empire, solidifying control in Punjab.
Bahadur Shah Zafar	Last Mughal Emperor	19th century	Oversaw Dipalpur as part of the weakening Mughal influence in the Punjab.

== Demographics ==
Population

Historical population
Year	Pop.	±% p.a.
1951	7,889	—
1961	9,452	+1.82%
1972	13,933	+3.59%
1981	25,237	+6.82%
1998	57,224	+4.93%
2017	99,753	+2.97%
2023	122,759	+3.52%

According to 2023 census, Dipalpur had a population of 122,759.

Languages

Languages of Dipalpur MC (2023 Census)
1. Punjabi (95.4%)
2. Urdu (4.00%)
3. Others (0.60%)
