= Depalpur Tehsil =

Depalpur Tehsil تحصِيل دِيپالپُور
- Tehsil
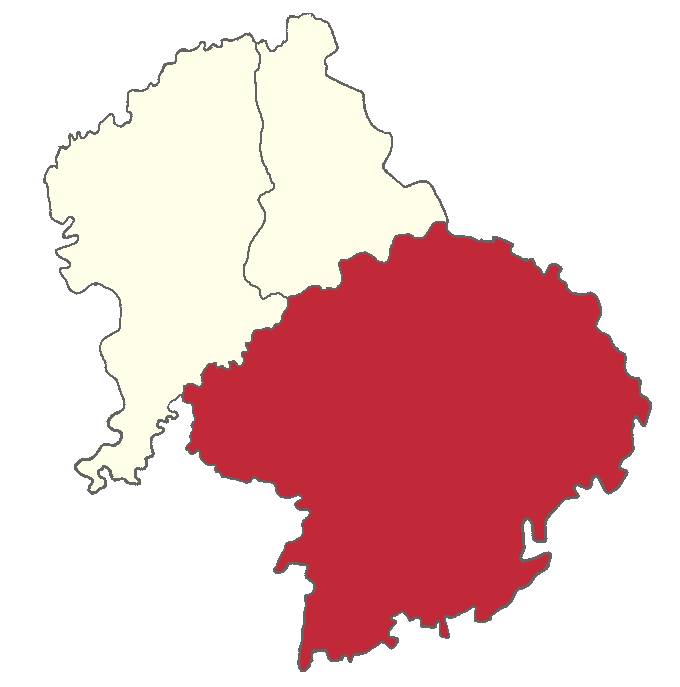
- Country: Pakistan
- Region: Punjab
- District: Okara District
- Capital: Depalpur
- Towns: 4
- Union councils: 56

Area
  - Total: 2,502 km^{2} (966 sq mi)

Population (2023 census)
  - Total: 1,592,201
  - Density: 636.4/km^{2} (1,648/sq mi)
- Time zone: UTC+ (PST)

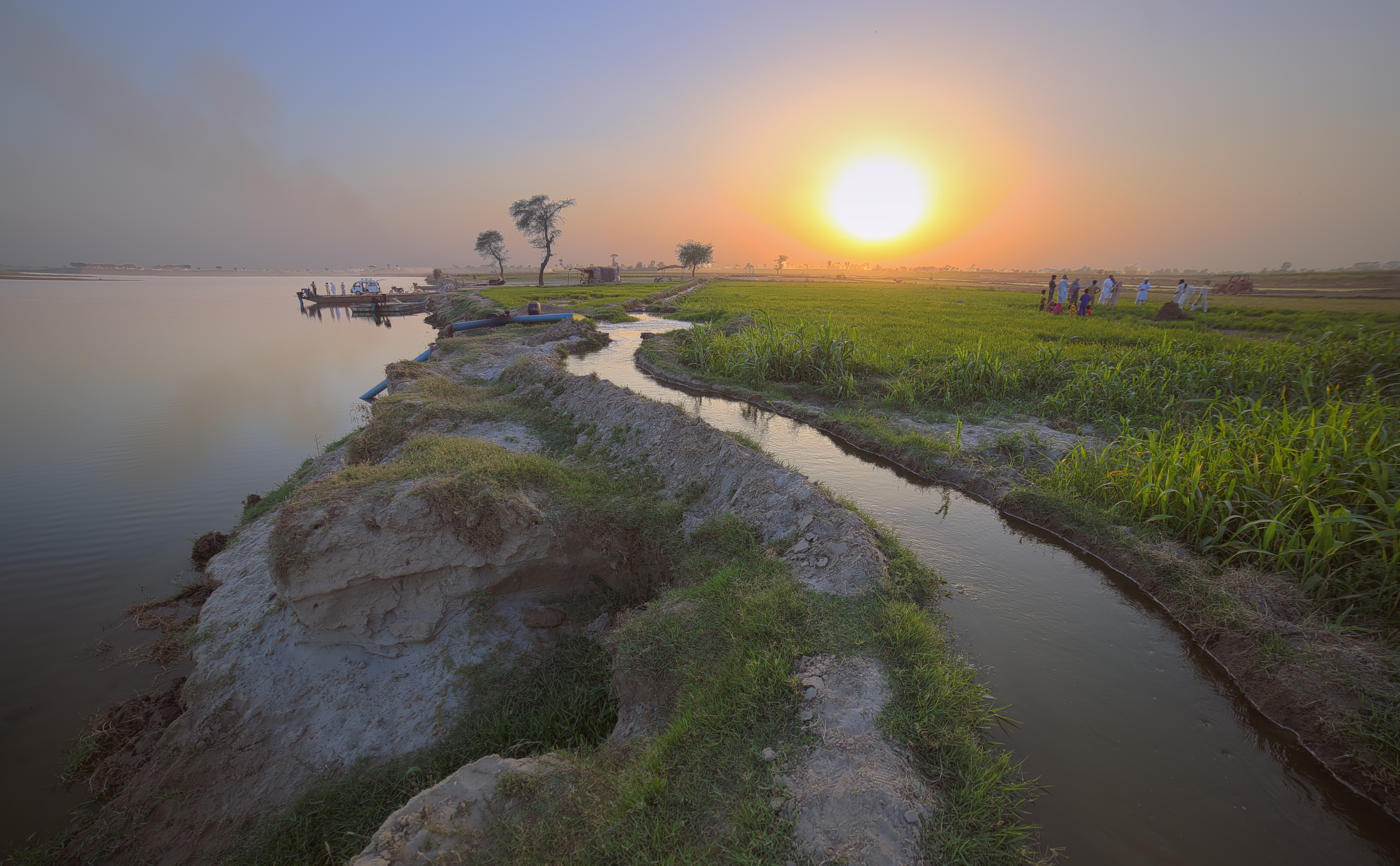
Most of the tehsil is characterized by flat irrigated lands

Depalpur Tehsil (Urdu: تحصِيل دِيپالپُور) is an administrative subdivision (tehsil) of Okara District in the Punjab province of Pakistan, headquartered at the city of Depalpur.

== Administration ==
- The tehsil is administratively subdivided into the following 55 Union Councils, three of which form the tehsil capital: Pul Dhool UC126, Awan Kalan, Basirpur City 112, Basirpur City 113, Bawa Bareet,

Behlol Pur, Bhella Ghulab Singh, Bhoman Shah, Bhon Munzabta, Amli Moti, Bonga Salah, Chipli Pur, Depalpur City 104, Depalpur City 105, Depalpur City D-103, Dhuliania, Farid Pur Sohag, Guddar Malkana, Hujra Shah Muqeem 109, Hujra Shah Muqeem 110, Hujra Shah Muqeem 111, Haveli Lakha City 106, Haveli Lakha City 107, Haveli Lakha City 108, Jaith Pur, Kari Wala Jageer Juj Khurad D-88, Kalair Kalan, Kani Pur, M. Nagar, Mancharian, Mandi Ahmed Abad, Maroof, Mazhar Abad, Meher Shah Khaga, Mohant Darshan, Mohib Ali Uttar, Mustafabad, Nama Jindaka, Nehal Mahaar, Pandat Munfool Pur, Phullan Tolli, Mouza Bhookan, Abadi Chowk Bhookan, Pipli Pahar, Qadir Abad, Qila Jivind Singh, Qila Tara Singh, Rajowal, Ratta Khunna, Rehmat Wala, Rohella Tejaka, Rukin Pura, Shah Nawaz Khan Wala, Shah Yaka, Sher Garh, Soba Ram, Wasaway Wala.
